= Palm Sunday Coup =

1944 attempted coup d'état in El Salvador

- Part of civil unrest during World War II
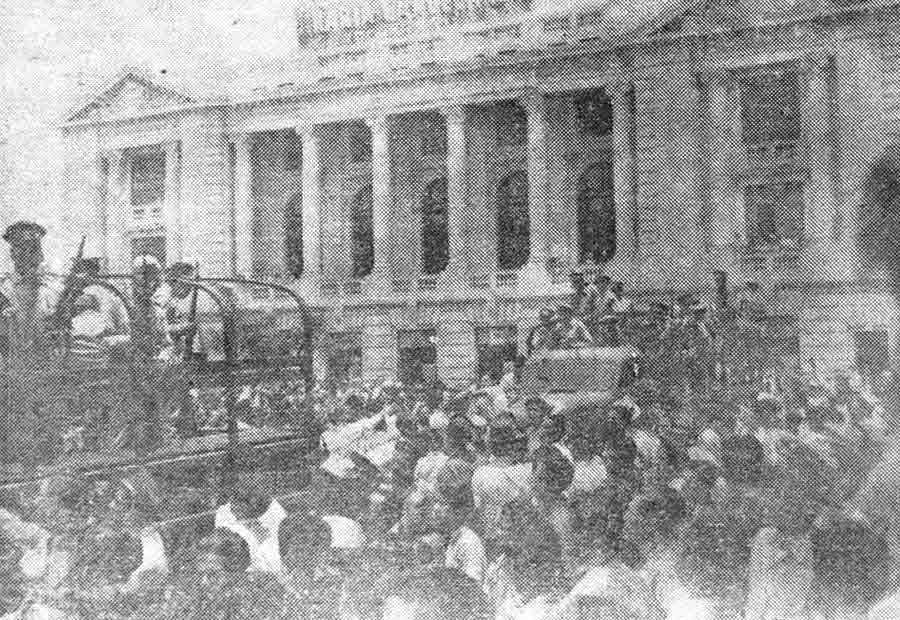
- Soldiers in San Salvador during the coup attempt
Date	2–3 April 1944
Location	El Salvador
Result	Coup suppressed

Belligerents
Military government; (El Salvador) Loyal armed forces	Rebel armed forces

Commanders and leaders
Maximiliano Hernández Martínez; (El Salvador) Andrés Ignacio Menéndez	Francisco Alfonso Marroquín (executed); Tito Tomás Calvo (executed)

Units involved
Salvadoran Army	First Infantry Regiment; Second Artillery Regiment; Salvadoran Air Force

The Palm Sunday Coup (Spanish: golpe de estado del Domingo de Ramos) was an attempted military coup d'état in El Salvador which occurred in early-April 1944. The coup was staged by pro-Axis sympathizers in the Salvadoran Army against President General Maximiliano Hernández Martínez.

== Background ==
General Maximiliano Hernández Martínez became president of El Salvador following a military coup d'état on 4 December 1931 against President Arturo Araujo and the dissolution of the Civic Directory. During the lead up to World War II, Martínez heavily sympathized with Germany and Italy. However, under pressure from the United States, the primary coffee buyer of El Salvador, he was forced to abandon his sympathies and agreed to align himself alongside the Allies after the attack on Pearl Harbor. Likewise, German and Italian residents in El Salvador were expropriated of their lands and sent to internment camps in the United States.

== Coup ==
Martínez held an election in January 1944 and was reelected to a third term as President. His action angered many businessmen, politicians, and military officer since he blatantly violated the Constitution.

On 2 April 1944, military officers who had pro-Axis sympathies from the 1st Infantry Regiment and the 2nd Artillery Regiment initiated a coup against Martínez. The rebels were led by General Francisco Alfonso Marroquín and Colonel Tito Tomás Calvo, both of whom had previously played major roles in the massacres of indigenous peasants in 1932. The coup started on Palm Sunday and most senior military and government officials were either at home or attending church. The rebels rose up in the departments of San Salvador and Santa Ana. They took control of the national radio station and the police headquarters of Santa Ana during the coup. The Salvadoran Air Force joined the conspirators and bombed the city of Santa Ana while the army attacked civilians and overthrew the local government.

By the end of the day, Martínez ordered military units still loyal to him to crush the revolt. The coup was suppressed on 3 April, martial law was declared, and a national curfew was put in place.

== Aftermath ==
Following the coup attempt, Martínez initiated reprisals that lasted for two weeks. Thirty people, including ringleaders Alfonso Marroquin and Tomás Calvo, were executed. Tomás Calvo tried to seek asylum at the American embassy at San Salvador, but was forcefully expelled and handed back to the National Guard. Civilian protestors eventually forced Martínez to resign on 9 May in the Strike of Fallen Arms.

== See also ==
- Strike of Fallen Arms
