= Osmín Aguirre y Salinas =

President of El Salvador from 1944 to 1945

Colonel Osmín Aguirre y Salinas
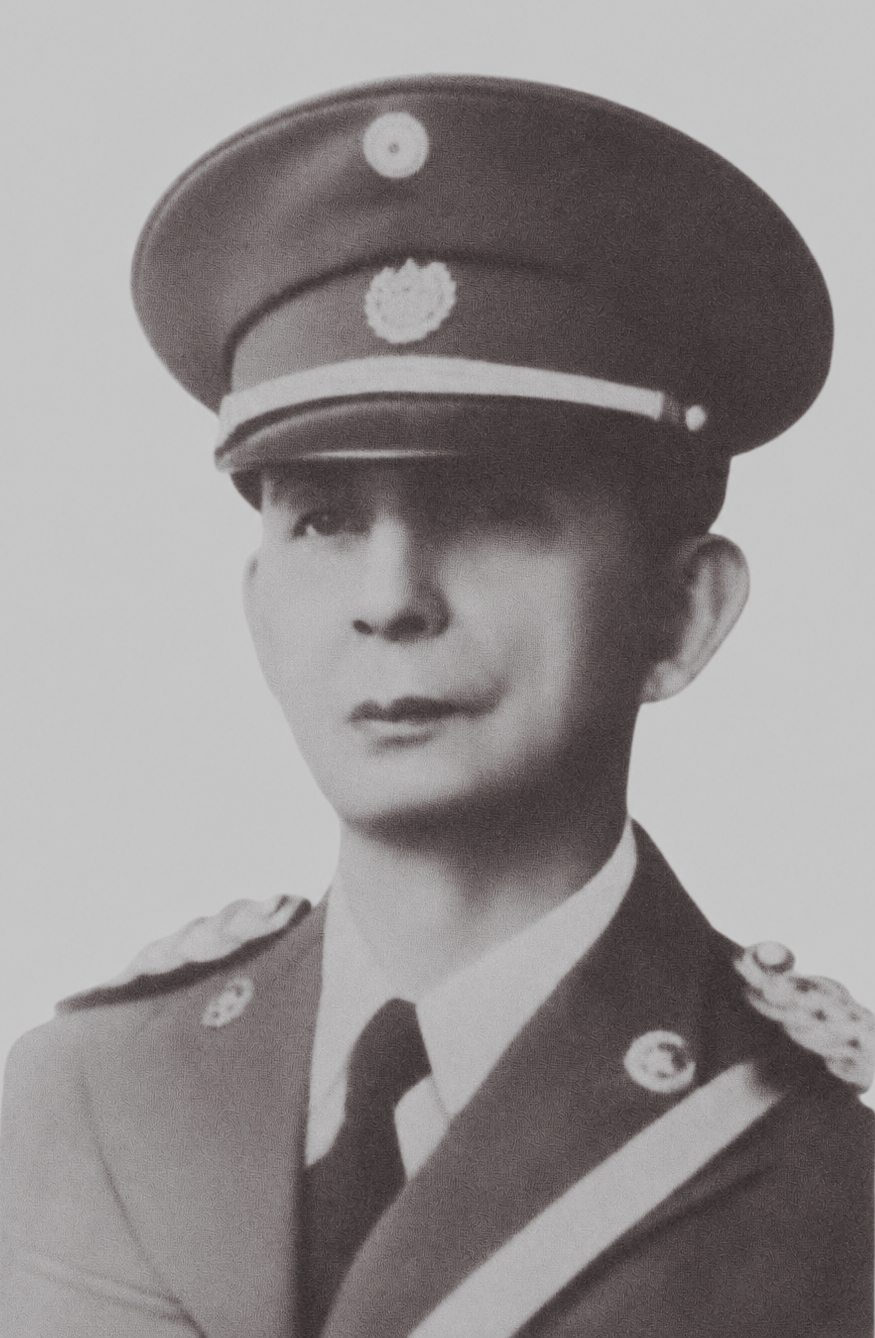

President of El Salvador
- In office 21 October 1944 – 1 March 1945; Provisional President
- Preceded by: Andrés Ignacio Menéndez
- Succeeded by: Salvador Castaneda Castro

Chairman of the Civic Directory
- In office 2 December 1931 – 4 December 1931 Serving with Joaquín Valdés
- Preceded by: Position established
- Succeeded by: Position abolished

Minister of War, the Navy, and Aviation of El Salvador
- In office 2 December 1931 – 4 December 1931; Provisional Minister
- Preceded by: Maximiliano Hernández Martínez
- Succeeded by: Joaquín Valdés

Personal details
- Born: Osmín Aguirre y Salinas; 24 December 1889 San Miguel, El Salvador
- Died: 12 July 1977 (aged 87) San Salvador, El Salvador
- Manner of death: Assassination (gunshot wound)
- Party: Social Democratic Party
- Spouse: Rosa Cardona
- Children: 4
- Occupation: Military officer, politician

Military service
- Allegiance: El Salvador
- Branch/service: Salvadoran Army
- Years of service: ?–1945
- Rank: Colonel
- Battles/wars: Totoposte War; 1931 Salvadoran coup d'état; La Matanza; October 1944 Salvadoran coup d'état

Osmín Aguirre y Salinas (24 December 1889 – 12 July 1977) was a Salvadoran military officer and politician who served as the provisional president of El Salvador from 21 October 1944 until 1 March 1945. A colonel in the Salvadoran Army, Aguirre led two successful coups against the Salvadoran government: once in 1931 (installing General Maximiliano Hernández Martínez in power) and once more in 1944 (installing himself in power). He left office in 1945, with the assurance that his successor in the next election would be Salvador Castaneda Castro. Aguirre was later assassinated by left-wing guerrillas near his home in San Salvador at the age of 87.

The Supreme Court declared his term unconstitutional, and the United States did not recognize his coming to power, which deemed his regime pro-fascist.

As the chief of the National Police of El Salvador, Aguirre was one of main perpetrators of La Matanza.

== Early life ==
Osmín Aguirre y Salinas was born in San Miguel, El Salvador on 24 December 1889. Aguirre married Rosa Cardona and the couple had four children.

== Military career ==
Aguirre became a cadet in the Salvadoran Army on 13 January 1906. He participated in the 1906 Totoposte War against Guatemala as a sub-lieutenant. He was promoted to lieutenant in 1908; to captain on 5 September 1913; major captain on 23 October 1917; lieutenant colonel on 3 June 1922; and colonel on 3 November 1927.

== Government of Maximiliano Hernández Martínez ==
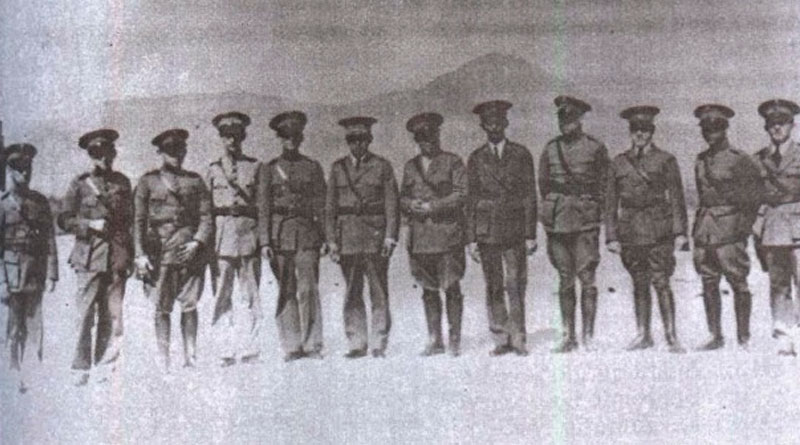
The Civic Directory of El Salvador. Osmín Aguirre y Salinas is the 5th from the right.

On 2 December 1931, President Arturo Araujo was overthrown by military officers of the Armed Forces of El Salvador. Aguirre took part in the coup and became a member of the Civic Directory, a military junta established after the coup's success. Aguirre served as the junta's minister of war, the navy, and aviation. The junta dissolved on 4 December and handed over power to General Maximiliano Hernández Martínez, Araujo's vice president. Martínez appointed Aguirre as the chief of the National Police.

In January 1932, peasants across western El Salvador took up arms against the government after legislative elections were cancelled by Martínez. In what would become a massacre of 25,000 to 40,000 indigenous peasants and communists, Aguirre was put in charge of capturing Farabundo Martí, one of the rebellion's communist leaders.

== Presidency ==
On 9 May 1944, Martínez resigned due to an attempted coup, strikes being conducted against his government, and pressure from the United States. After Martínez's resignation, General Andrés Ignacio Menéndez became Provisional President of El Salvador.

On 21 October 1944, Aguirre and other military officers who previously supported Martínez overthrew Menéndez's government. Aguirre became the country's provisional president as he was the first presidential designate. Aguirre created his cabinet on 23 October. It consisted of Reyes Arrieta Rossi as minister of foreign relations and justice; Adolfo Pérez Menéndez as minister of public instruction; Francisco Emilio Ponce as minister of governance, labor, promotion, and social assistance; Lisandro Villaloboa as minister of finance, public credit, industry, and commerce; and Salvador Peña Trejo as minister of national defense.

Aguirre cracked down on political opposition which lead to an armed uprising being launched by students in San Salvador on 8 December, followed by an insurgent attack from Guatemala four days later where dictator Jorge Ubico had been overthrown in July. Both movements were crushed by the Aguirre government, which thus consolidated its position in power.

During his brief and short presidency, he issued a decree reforming the regulations of executive power on 28 February 1945, with the purpose of making a "more rational distribution of the different branches of public administration" and considering "urgent the introduction of some reforms to the Regulation of the Executive Power, so that the incoming Government can organize said services on new bases".

In January 1945, Aguirre oversaw the presidential elections and ran in them to be elected to a second term. The election was boycotted by five candidates who withdrew after accusing Aguirre of unfair election practices to ensure victory for his favored candidate. The election ended in a victory for General Salvador Castaneda Castro of the Social Democratic Unification Party with 312,754 votes and a margin of 99.70 percent. Aguirre himself only received 690 votes, a margin of 0.22 percent, in the heavily rigged election.

Aguirre's term ended on 1 March 1945 and Castaneda was sworn in as President. After leaving office, Aguirre retired from politics and military service.

== Assassination ==
Aguirre was shot and killed on 12 July 1977 in San Salvador while he was being taken to the Military Hospital. He was 87 years old at the time of his death. The Farabundo Martí Popular Liberation Forces claimed responsibility for the assassination.

== Dates of ranks ==
The following is a list of Aguirre's military ranks during his career.

Insignia	Rank	Service branch	Date of promotion
Sub-lieutenant	Sub-lieutenant	Army	1906
Lieutenant	Lieutenant	Army	1908
Captain	Captain	Army	5 September 1913
Major captain	Major captain	Army	23 October 1917
Lieutenant colonel	Lieutenant colonel	Army	3 June 1922
Colonel	Colonel	Army	3 November 1927

Political offices
Preceded by Andrés Ignacio Menéndez (provisional)	President of El Salvador (provisional); 1944–1945	Succeeded by Salvador Castaneda Castro
New office	Chairman of the Civic Directory; 1931 with Joaquín Valdés (1931)	Office abolished
Preceded by Maximiliano Hernández Martínez	Minister of War, the Navy, and Aviation of El Salvador (provisional); 1931	Succeeded by Joaquín Valdés (acting)
