= Joaquín Valdés =

Salvadoran military officer

Colonel Joaquín Valdés
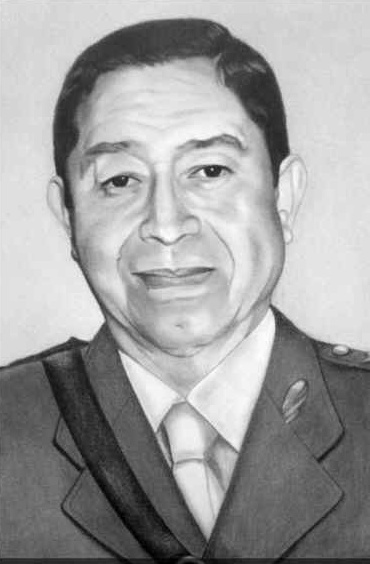

Chairman of the Civic Directory
- In office 2 December 1931 – 4 December 1931 Serving with Osmín Aguirre y Salinas
- Preceded by: Position established
- Succeeded by: Position abolished

Minister of National Defense
- In office 4 December 1931 – 1 March 1935; Acting Minister of National Defense
- President: Maximiliano Hernández Martínez (until 28 August 1934); Andrés Ignacio Menéndez (from 28 August 1934)
- Preceded by: Osmín Aguirre y Salinas
- Succeeded by: Andrés Ignacio Menéndez

Personal details
- Born: 22 September 1906 San Salvador, El Salvador
- Died: 30 August 1957 (aged 50) San Salvador, El Salvador
- Occupation: Military

Military service
- Allegiance: El Salvador
- Branch/service: Salvadoran Army
- Rank: Colonel
- Commands: National Guard
- Battles/wars: 1931 Salvadoran coup d'état La Matanza

Joaquín Valdés (22 September 1906 – 30 August 1957) was a Salvadoran military officer who served as the Minister of National Defense from 1931 to 1935 and as Co-chairman of the Civic Directory in December 1931.

== Biography ==
Joaquín Valdés was born on 22 September 1906 in San Salvador, El Salvador. He joined the Salvadoran Army and rose to the rank of Colonel.

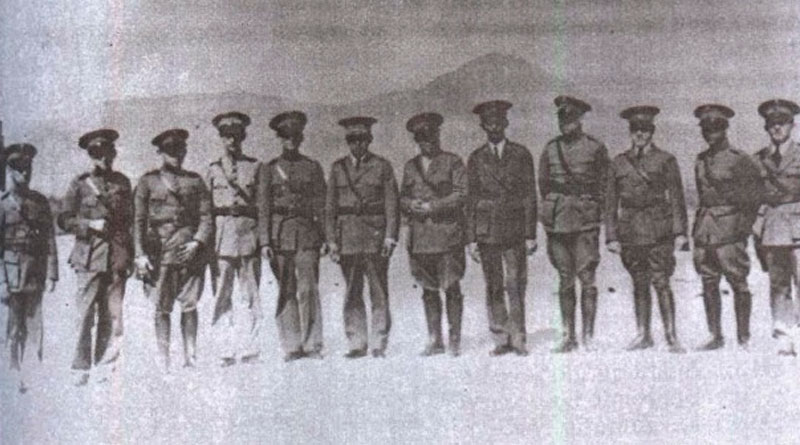
The Civic Directory of El Salvador of 2 December 1931. Joaquín Valdés is the 6th from the right.

On 2 December 1931, the Army staged a coup and deposed President Arturo Araujo. Valdés and Osmín Aguirre y Salinas appointed themselves as co-chairmen of the Civic Directory of El Salvador The Civic Directory was dissolved on 4 December 1931 and handed the Presidency to former Vice President Brigadier General Maximiliano Hernández Martínez.

Hernández Martínez appointed Joaquín Valdés to be his Minister of National Defense on 4 December 1931. He served until 1 March 1935 when he was replaced by Brigadier General Andrés Ignacio Menéndez.

Joaquín Valdés died in San Salvador, El Salvador, on 30 August 1957.

== See also ==
- Civic Directory
- Minister of National Defense of El Salvador

Political offices
New office	Chairman of the Civic Directory; 1931 with Osmín Aguirre y Salinas (1931)	Office abolished
Preceded by Osmín Aguirre y Salinas (provisional)	Minister of National Defense (acting); 1931–1935	Succeeded by Andrés Ignacio Menéndez
