= La Matanza =

1932 peasant revolt in El Salvador

Coordinates: 13.666°N 89.166°W

- Map of the Salvadoran departments affected by the revolt
Date	Main rebellion: 22–25 January 1932; Army killings: 25 January – February 1932
Location	Western El Salvador Departments: Ahuachapán; La Libertad; Santa Ana; Sonsonate
Result	Revolt suppressed, ethnocide of Pipil people

Belligerents
Peasant rebels; Communist Party of El Salvador; Pipil rebels	Salvadoran government; Armed Forces; National Guard; National Police

Commanders and leaders
Farabundo Martí (executed); Mario Zapata (executed); Alfonso Luna (executed); Francisco Sánchez (executed); Feliciano Ama (executed)	Maximiliano Hernández Martínez; Osmín Aguirre y Salinas; Joaquín Valdés; José Tomás Calderón; Marcelino Galdámez

Strength
70,000–80,000	Unknown

Casualties and losses
10,000 to 40,000 killed	~100 killed

La Matanza (Spanish for 'The Massacre') refers to a communist-indigenous rebellion that took place in El Salvador between 22 and 25 January 1932. After the revolt was suppressed, it was followed by large-scale government killings in western El Salvador, which resulted in the deaths of 10,000 to 40,000 people. Another 100 soldiers were killed during the suppression of the revolt.

On 22 January 1932, members of the Communist Party of El Salvador (PCES) and Pipil peasants launched a rebellion against the Salvadoran military government due to widespread social unrest and the suppression of democratic political freedoms, especially after the cancellation of the results of the 1932 legislative election.

During the rebellion, the communist and indigenous rebels, led by Farabundo Martí and Feliciano Ama, respectively, captured several towns and cities across western El Salvador, killing an estimated 2,000 people and causing over US$100,000 in property damage. The Salvadoran government, led by General Maximiliano Hernández Martínez, who had assumed power following the 1931 Salvadoran coup d'état, declared martial law, and ordered the suppression of the revolt.

Most of the people who were killed during La Matanza, which has been described as an ethnocide, were Pipil peasants and non-combatants, causing the extermination of the majority of the Pipil-speaking population, which led to a near total loss of the spoken language in El Salvador. Many of the rebellion's leaders, including Martí and Ama, were executed by the military. The government's repression also forced several communist leaders to flee the country and go into exile.

== Background ==
=== Social unrest ===
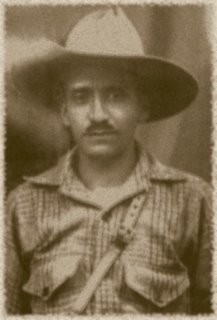
Farabundo Martí in 1929

Social unrest in El Salvador began to grow in the 1920s. El Salvador had three distinct social classes: the upper class, made up of wealthy landowners; the middle class, composed of politicians and soldiers; and the lower class, which was composed of mostly peasants and workers.

In 1920, a group of communist and socialist students, teachers, and artisans, established the Regional Federation of Salvadoran Workers (FRTS), El Salvador's first trade union to organize rural and urban workers. One of the rural leaders of the FRTS was Farabundo Martí, who, together with Miguel Mármol, founded the Communist Party of El Salvador (PCES) in 1930. Between 1928 and 1932, Martí fought alongside Augusto César Sandino in Nicaragua against the United States' occupation of the country.

=== Economic problems ===
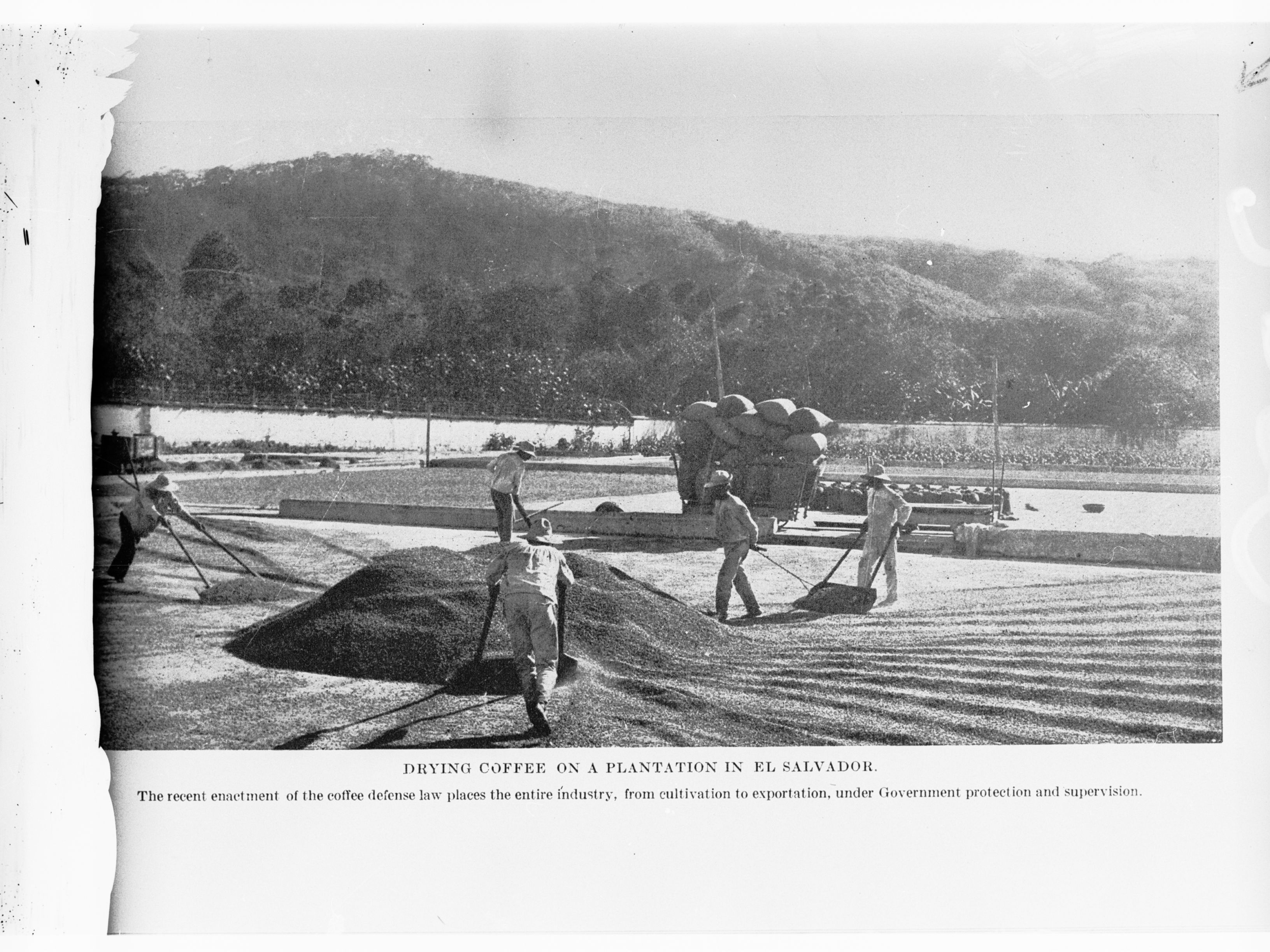
Drying coffee on a Salvadoran plantation in 1905

In the late-19th and early-20th centuries, the Salvadoran economy was heavily dependent on exporting coffee and coffee beans, which accounted for 75 to 95 percent of all of El Salvador's exports by 1929. Most of the coffee plantations, and the profits made by the plantations, were owned by the so-called "Fourteen Families".

Due to the collapse of coffee prices worldwide as a result of the Great Depression in 1929, coffee producers were unable to cover the cost of producing coffee or pay their workers, leading to various coffee plantations failing and many workers to go unemployed. As a result of the reduced exports, national income fell 50 percent from the year prior, decreasing from US40–50¢ per day to only US20¢ per day.

=== Political situation ===
==== Meléndez–Quiñónez dynasty and the 1931 election ====
On 9 February 1913, Salvadoran president Manuel Enrique Araujo died to his wounds after being attacked by three farmers with machetes in San Salvador during an assassination attempt. After Araujo's death, he was succeeded by a political dynasty; Araujo's vice president, Carlos Meléndez, his younger brother, Jorge Meléndez, and their brother-in-law, Alfonso Quiñónez Molina, held the presidency of El Salvador from 1913 until 1927 in the Meléndez–Quiñónez dynasty. (Note: Carlos Meléndez served 1913–1914 (acting), 1915–1918†. Jorge Meléndez served 1919–1923. Alfonso Quiñónez Molina served 1914–1915 (acting), 1918–1919 (acting), 1923–1927.) The political dynasty ended when Quiñónez chose Pío Romero Bosque as his successor, as there were no other family members who were willing to assume the presidency.

During his term, Romero lifted restrictions on the existence of political parties in opposition to the ruling National Democratic Party (PDN). In 1931, a presidential election was held in the country, which is considered by historians to be the first free and fair election in Salvadoran history. The three primary candidates in the election were Alberto Gómez Zárate, the minister of national defense during Romero's presidency, Arturo Araujo, an engineer and coffee planter who was a distant relative of Manuel Enrique Araujo, and Maximiliano Hernández Martínez, a military officer. Araujo and Martínez eventually ran together on a joint ticket and defeated Zárate, although they did not attain a majority of the vote. Despite the military's support for Zárate and belief that they would reject the results of the election, the armed forces upheld them. The Communist Party of El Salvador won several municipal elections.

==== Military coup and the canceled 1932 election ====
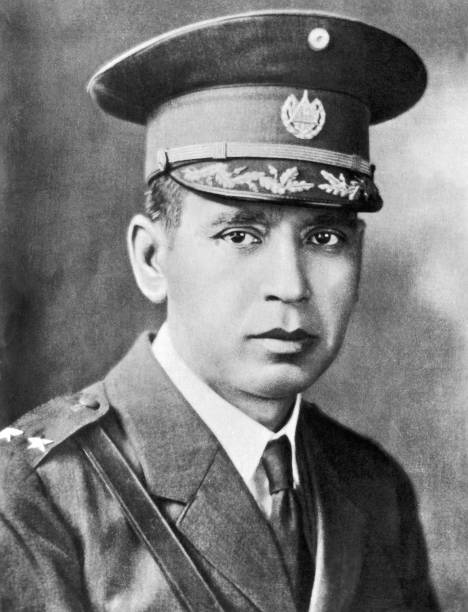
General Maximiliano Hernández Martínez

During Araujo's administration, El Salvador was still struggling economically as a result of the Great Depression leading to social unrest across the country. In an attempt to improve the economy, Araujo reduced the military's budget and ordered some military officials to retire. His efforts were strongly opposed by the military, which staged a coup on 2 December 1931, deposing Araujo and establishing the Civic Directory. The military government was dissolved two days later when Martínez was declared as the country's acting president, however, his government was not recognized by the United States. The December 1931 coup began a period of forty-eight years of military rule in the country.

In the few days after the coup, the Communist Party of El Salvador was "cautiously optimistic" about the coup, writing an open letter to Martínez's government through its Estrella Roja newspaper, stating that the coup was "heroic and necessary" while also believing that his government would reimpose an exploitative capitalist system. Before Araujo was deposed, municipal and legislative elections were scheduled for 15 December 1931, but after his government was overthrown, the military rescheduled the municipal elections for 3–5 January 1932 and the legislative elections for 10–12 January 1932.

When the communist party began to win several municipal elections in western El Salvador, the government canceled the results of all of the municipal elections. The legislative elections proceeded on 10 January, and despite early polling returns indicating a communist victory in San Salvador, a delayed official result announced that three non-communists won the three seats of the San Salvador department. Violence occurred throughout the electoral process, and at least thirty communists were killed in Ahuachapán.

== Preparations for revolt ==
=== Planning and attempt for compromise ===
Due to the result of the elections, communist party leaders believed that they could no longer come to power through legal means, as Martínez's government effectively canceled the elections. The Communist Party of El Salvador was led by Martí and Mármol. Other communist leaders included Mario Zapata, Alfonso Luna, Rafael Bondanza, and Ismael Hernández. Hernández, who was a member of the International Red Aid, believed that the United States would support the rebels and mistake it as a pro-Araujo counterrevolution. The communists' primary inspiration for revolution was the Bolsheviks' 1917 October Revolution.

According to Abel Cuenca, a Salvadoran communist and participant in the rebellion, the rebellion was not planned until after the municipal election results were canceled, with actual planning beginning on 9 or 10 January 1932. In contrast, according to Jorge Schlesinger, a Salvadoran writer, Martí began planning the rebellion in mid-December 1931 while in Puerto Cortés, Honduras. His claim, however, has been essentially discredited as his piece of evidence for his claim, a letter allegedly written by Martí discussing the rebellion, was dated to 16 December 1932, rather than 1931.

In a final attempt to avoid a violent rebellion, the communist party sent a political commission consisting of Zapata, Luna, Clemente Abel Estrada, Rubén Darío Fernández, and Joaquín Rivas to the National Palace to enter into negotiations with the government. The commission was not allowed to meet directly with Martínez, instead being directed to Colonel Joaquín Valdés, the minister of national defense, where the commission demanded "substantial contributions to the welfare of the peasants" in exchange for a cessation of illegal activities, threatening to revolt if the demands were not met. Reportedly, Luna told Valdés, "the peasants will win with their machetes the rights you are denying them", to which Valdés responded, "you have machetes; we have machine guns". The meeting ended with no compromise being met.

=== Government knowledge of the rebellion ===
Just before the rebellion, Juan Pablo Wainwright was arrested in Guatemala. Wainwright was a communist party member who was rallying support from communists in Guatemala to invade El Salvador to overthrow Martínez's government, and his arrest ended the possibility of a foreign invasion force from aiding rebels in El Salvador. On 18 January, Martí, Luna, and Zapata were arrested by the Salvadoran government, but the arrests were not made public until 20 January, and plans to attack the barracks in San Salvador were captured by the army. On 21 January, the government instructed newspapers in the country to report that a rebellion was planned to occur the following day.

Cuenca theorized that Martínez intentionally allowed the revolt to happen by preventing the opportunity for social and political reform to occur. The theory asserts that the intention of letting revolution occur was to crush it forcibly, as he believed the movement was doomed to fail, and that the suppression of the communist uprising would help him gain support and recognition from the United States.

Dr. Alejandro D. Marroquín argued that Martínez actually feared a potential attack from Araujo's Salvadoran Laborist Party from Guatemala, rather than the communist rebellion itself. He argued that Martínez allowed the rebellion to occur and crushed it by force to deprive Araujo of an armed movement to help bring him back to power.

== Rebellion ==
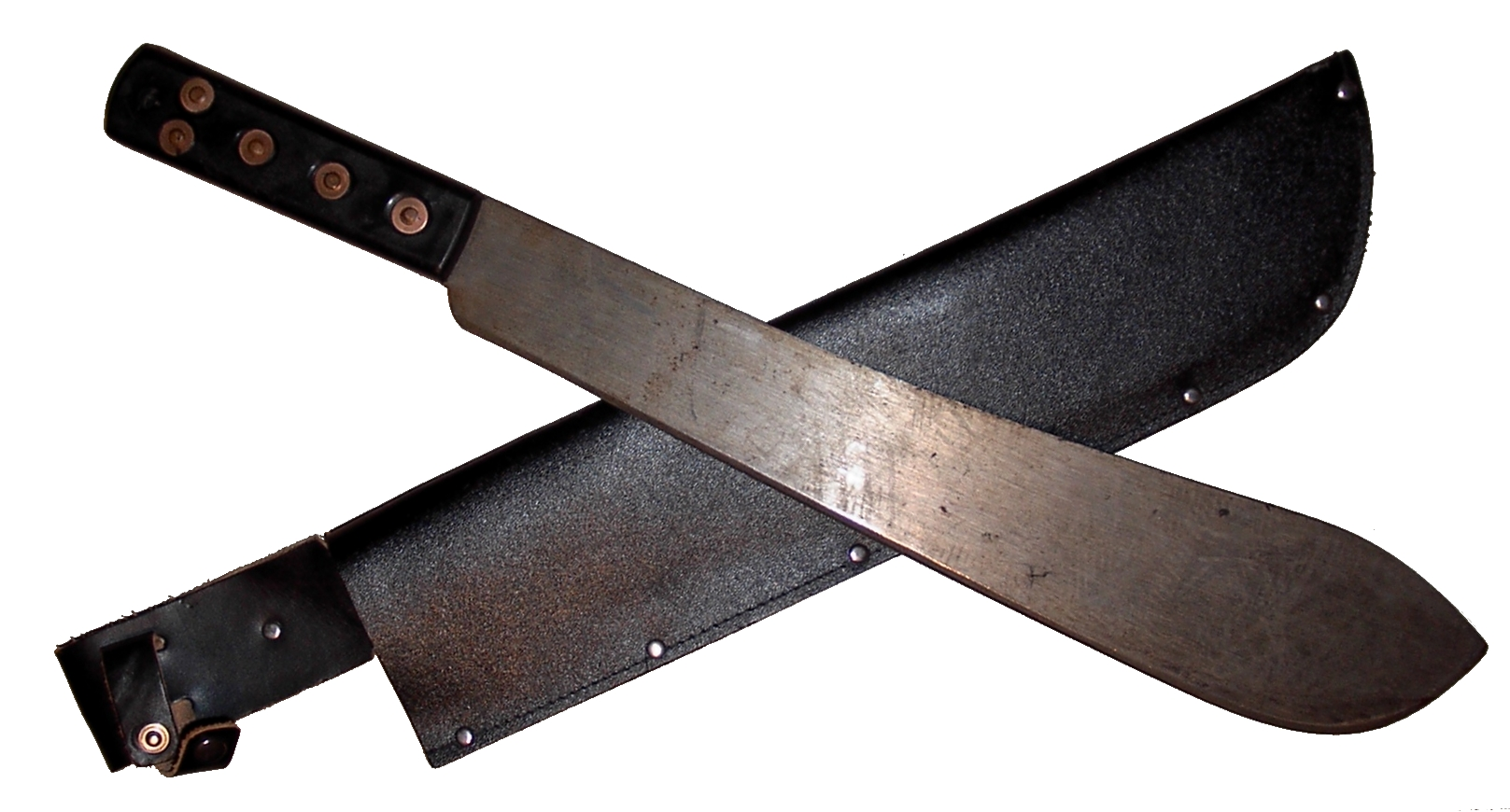
Machetes were one of the primary weapons used by the peasant rebels.

In the late hours of 22 January 1932, thousands of peasants in the western part of the country, armed with sticks, machetes, and "poor-quality" shotguns, rose up in rebellion against Martínez's regime. According to General José Tomás Calderón, an estimated 70,000 to 80,000 rebels were involved in the uprising.

Rebels led by Francisco Sánchez attacked telegraph offices, their primary target, in Juayúa at 11:00 p.m. and eventually took control of the city due to a lack of a military presence. The rebels attacked the home of Emilio Radaelli, a coffee merchant referred to as the "richest man in town", and assassinated him, along with his son and wife, who was also raped. Radaelli's house and two of his stores were burned, with many more stores being looted. Colonel Mateo Vaquero was also killed by the rebels and several civilians were tortured and murdered. Miguel Call, the mayor of Izalco, Rafael Castro Cármaco, a politician from Chalchuapa, and General Rafael Rivas, the military commander of Tacuba, were also killed by the rebels.

"After invading the town, they [the rebels] set fire to the municipal building, destroying it completely, and then proceeded to break down the doors of the homes of Señor Antonio Salaverría, Dr. Tiburico Morán, Señorita Rosenda Rodríguez, don Benjamín Inocente Orantes, don Moisés Canales, don Francisco Pérez Alvarado, and the local bar. In the home of José Dolores Salaverría they broke the windows above a balcony. In the aforementioned houses, in addition to inflicting serious structural damage, the rebels destroyed all sorts of furniture and objects of value."

— M. Figueroa, military commander of Salcoatitán, 14 March 1932

Businesses and homes were destroyed by rebels, with the total property damage inflicted being estimated at around SVC₡300,000 (approximately US$120,000 in 1932). Much of the damage was inflicted against property owned by wealthy individuals and families. Eventually, the rebels captured the towns of Colón, Juayúa, Nahuizalco, Salcoatitán, Sonzacate, and Tacuba. Additionally, Pipil rebels led by Feliciano Ama supported the communist rebels and captured the town of Izalco on 23 January. Ama was an influential indigenous leader in Izalco, and believed that joining the rebellion would help him gain political office. Meanwhile, the majority of the Pipil rebels were sympathetic to the communists' ideals, and believed that they possessed a "secret weapon or magic" which would assure victory.

Despite efforts to prevent communication with the military garrisons in Ahuachapán, Sonsonate, and Santa Ana, Izalco managed to send a telegram to Sonsonate warning the military garrison there of the rebel attacks before the telegraph office was destroyed. The warning was received by the military garrison in Sonsonate, and in response, Colonel Ernesto Bará sent an expeditionary force under the command of Major Mariano Molina to crush the rebellion on 23 January. Molina's soldiers first clashed with the rebels outside of Sonzacate, and after engaging in hand-to-hand combat, the rebels retreated to the city proper. Casualties from the battle included fifty to seventy dead rebels, five dead soldiers, and half a dozen more soldiers wounded.

The Canadian warships HMCS Skeena and HMCS Vancouver were docked at the Port of Acajutla, and the ships were requested by the United Kingdom to protect any British citizens in the country. Ships from the United States arrived shortly after and the ships offered to assist the Salvadoran government in quelling the rebellion, however, Calderón turned down the offer, stating:

The chief of Operation of the Western Zone of the Republic, Major General José Tomás Calderón, presents his compliments on behalf of the government of General Martínez and of himself, to Admiral Smith and Commander Brandeur, of the Rochester, Skeena, and Vancouver, I am pleased to announce that peace in El Salvador is restored, that the communist offensive has been completely suppressed and dispersed, and that complete extermination will be achieved. 4,800 Bolsheviks were wiped out.

— José Tomás Calderón

On 23 January, Martínez published a manifesto in the Diario Oficial, the official national newspaper of El Salvador. The manifesto read:

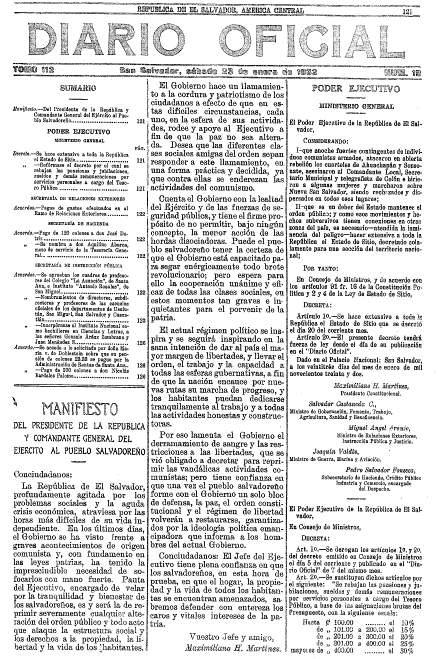
Maximiliano Hernández Martínez's manifesto regarding the uprising

Fellow citizens:

The Republic of El Salvador, profoundly agitated by the social problems and the acute economic crisis, traverses the most difficult hours of its independent life. In the last few days, the Government has seen grave events of communist origin and, with foundation in the national laws, I have had the impressionable necessity to suffocate them with a strong hand. Executive guidelines, charged with ensuring tranquility and the wellbeing of Salvadorans, are and will be severely punished for any alteration of public order and any act that attacks the social structure and the rights to property, liberty, and life of the inhabitants.

The Government makes a call to the sanity and patriotism of the citizens to the effect that in these difficult circumstances, everyone, in the sphere of its activities, surround and support the Executive so that peace is not altered. We wish that the different social classes, friends of the order, know how to respond to this appeal, in a practical and decided form, now that against them raises the communist activities.

The Government counts on the loyalty of the Army and the public security forces, and has the firm purpose to now allow, under any concept, the minor action of the disruptive hordes. The Salvadoran people can have certainty that the Government has the capacity to strongly reap every revolutionary outbreak; but expect for them the unanimous and effective cooperation of all the social classes, in these grave and haunting moments for the future of the fatherland.

The current political regime inspires and continues to inspire the sane intention of giving the country the largest margin of liberties, and maintain order, labor, and the capacity of all governmental forces, so that the nation channels its march of progress through new channels, and the inhabitants can tranquilly dedicate themselves to labor and all the honest and constructive activities.

Because of that, the Government laments the shedding of blood and the restriction of liberties, which was seen as obligated to decree to suppress the vandalous communist activities; but have faith that once the Salvadoran people forms a single bloc of defense with the Government, peace, constitutional order, and the state of liberty will return to restore itself, guaranteed by the emancipatory political ideology that informs the men of the present Government.

Fellow citizens: The Chief of the Executive has plenty faith in that the Salvadorans, in this hour of test, in which the homeland, the property, and the lives of all the inhabitants which are found threatened, will know how to defend with integrity the expensive and vital interests of the fatherland.

— Maximiliano Hernández Martínez

Quickly after the uprising in 24 January 1932, the government declared martial law and mobilized the military to crush the rebellion by force. Soldiers under the command of Colonel Marcelino Galdámez marched into the departments of Sonsonate and Ahuachapán and captured Izalco that same day. Nahuizalco, Salcoatitán, Juayúa were all captured the next day, and the rebellion was fully crushed by the afternoon of 25 January 1932. Around 100 soldiers were killed during the rebellion's suppression.

== Subsequent government killings ==
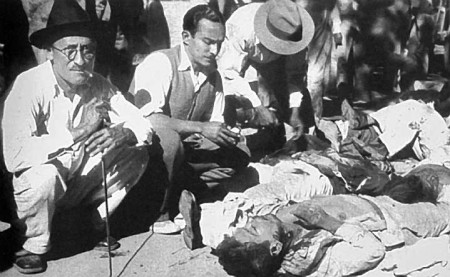
Dead bodies of people killed by the army during La Matanza

On 25 January 1932, reinforcements under Calderón arrived in Sonsonate and began reprisals against peasants, especially against ethnic Pipils, in western El Salvador, indiscriminately killing thousands of civilians in the process. In several towns, the entire male population was gathered in the town's center and killed by machine gun fire. The killings persisted for two weeks until February 1932 when the government decided that the region had been sufficiently "pacified".

René Padilla Velasco, Martí's lawyer during his show trial, argued that Martínez forced Martí to launch the rebellion as a final "desperate" effort to prevent him from consolidating dictatorial control of the country. Martí, Luna, and Zapata were executed by a firing squad on 1 February 1932. Ama and Sánchez were captured by the army in Izalco on 25 January 1932; Sánchez was executed by a firing squad that same day, while Ama was lynched in a plaza in the city on 28 January 1932. Many refugees attempted to flee the country to Guatemala to escape the government's repression, however, Guatemalan president Jorge Ubico closed the border and handed over those who tried to flee back to the Salvadoran Army.

On 11 July 1932, the Legislative Assembly passed Directive 121 which officially declared an end to the rebellion. It also granted "unconditional amnesty" ("incondicional amnistía") to anyone—rebel, military, or otherwise—who committed crimes of any nature in order to "restore order, repress, persecute, punish, and capture those accused of the crime of rebellion" ("restablecimiento del orden, represión, persecución, castigo y captura de los sindicados en el delito derebelión").

== Aftermath ==
=== Death toll ===
Estimates of the exact death toll of the rebellion and subsequent government killings vary greatly; the figures most commonly estimated are between 10,000 and 40,000 dead. According to a Sonsonate resident interviewed by journalist Joaquín Méndez, the rebels killed approximately 2,000 people. Colonel Osmín Aguirre y Salinas, the chief of the National Police, stated that no more than 6,000 to 7,000 people were "executed". According to John Beverly, around 30,000 people—four percent of the population—were killed by the government. As a result of the large scale of the killings, the event has since been referred to as La Matanza (Spanish for "The Massacre").

=== Political effects ===
Following the mass killings, Martínez solidified his rule when the legislature confirmed his presidency in 1932. He also sought to legitimize his rule via presidential elections in 1935, 1939, and 1944, in which he was the only candidate. He exercised control of the country through force via the army and through friendly relations with the country's landowners and elites. Martínez was the country's longest serving president, serving from 1931 to 1944 when he resigned following an attempted coup and a series of mass protests against his government.

Martínez's government was not recognized by the United States after it came to power in 1931 due to the 1923 Central American Treaty of Peace and Amity which mandates its signatories shall not recognize any government which came to power via a coup d'état. Mauricio de la Selva, a Salvadoran poet and communist writer, theorized that Martínez crushed the rebellion with such violence as to appear to the United States as a "champion of anti-communism". The United States did eventually recognize Martínez's regime on 26 January 1934, not because of his government's anti-communist ideology, but because the United States perceived his government as bringing stability to the country.

The FMLN was named after Farabundo Martí, one of the rebellion's leaders.

Most of the surviving leaders of the Communist Party of El Salvador fled the country, primarily to Honduras and Costa Rica. The communist party itself was not banned, and it remained active in El Salvador throughout Martínez's presidency. The party even supported the mass protests which led to Martínez's resignation in 1944. In 1980, various left-wing militia groups of the Salvadoran Civil War joined forces and formed the Farabundo Martí National Liberation Front (FMLN), named after Martí. The FMLN continues to exist as one of El Salvador's major political parties.

=== Effect on indigenous communities ===
Some scholars label the mass killings of Pipil as an ethnocide, since the army used indigenous appearance, dress, and language to help designate who should be targeted. As a result, in the decades that followed, Salvadoran indigenous peoples increasingly abandoned their native dress and traditional languages for fear of further reprisals. The events brought about the extermination of the majority of the Pipil-speaking population, which led to a near total loss of the spoken language in El Salvador. Many of the indigenous people who did not participate in the uprising stated that they did not understand the motivation of the government's persecution.

Over the years since La Matanza, the recorded population willing to self-identify as indigenous has fallen to about 10 percent in the 21st century. In the decade following the uprising, military presence in the area was persistent with the objective of keeping the peasants under control so that the events did not recur. After Martínez's dictatorship, the method of preventing peasant discontent changed from repression to social reforms which benefitted them.

=== Commemoration ===
In the town of Izalco, the uprising is commemorated annually on 22 January. Media coverage is moderate, but the commemoration is supported by municipal authorities who pay tribute to all who were killed during the event. Speakers include people who lived through the event, and relatives of Ama.

In 2010, President Mauricio Funes, the first Salvadoran president to be a member of the FMLN, apologized to the indigenous communities of El Salvador for the brutal acts of persecution and extermination carried out by previous governments. In a statement made during the inauguration of the First Congress of Indigenous Peoples, he stated, "In this context and this spirit, my government wishes to be the first government to, on behalf of the State of El Salvador, of the people of El Salvador, and of the families of El Salvador, make an act of contrition and apologize to the indigenous communities for the persecution and extermination of which they were victims during so many years" ("Este gobierno que presido, quiere ser el primer gobierno que en nombre del Estado salvadoreño, en nombre del pueblo salvadoreño, en nombre de las familias salvadoreñas, haga un acto de contrición y pida perdón a las comunidades indígenas, por la persecución y por el exterminio de que fueron víctimas, durante tantos y tantos años").

The Jeffrey Gould-directed 2002 film 1932: Scars of Memory describes the events of the uprising and subsequent massacre.

== See also ==
- Anti-communist mass killings
- Guatemalan genocide
- History of El Salvador
- List of massacres in El Salvador
- List of peasant revolts
