= Juan Ramón Munés =

Salvadoran military officer

Lieutenant Colonel Juan Ramón Munés
- Born: 15 April 1903; Santa Ana, El Salvador
- Died: 18 February 1968 (aged 64)
- Allegiance: El Salvador
- Branch: Salvadoran Army
- Service years: 1924–1951
- Rank: Lieutenant colonel
- Commands: Salvadoran Aviation Corps
- Conflicts: 1931 Salvadoran coup d'état La Matanza

Juan Ramón Munés (15 April 1903 – 18 February 1968) was a Salvadoran military officer and one of the first Salvadoran pilots. He was a member of the Civic Directory, a military junta established after the 1931 Salvadoran coup d'état. He commanded the Salvadoran Aviation Corps (air force) from 1931 to 1944.

== Biography ==
Juan Ramón Munés was born on 15 April 1903 in Santa Ana, El Salvador. His parents were Juan Munés and María Mateu.

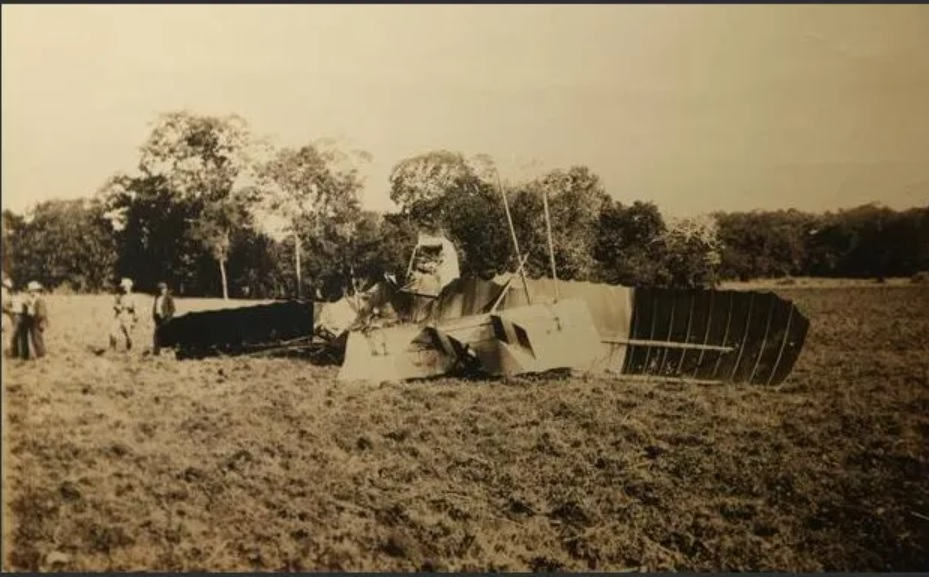
The Caudron G.3 involved in the 1923 accident where Munés survived but Enrico Massi died

In 1923, Munés and Ricardo Aberle became the first students of the Military Aviation School taught by Italian aviator Enrico Massi. On 4 October 1923, Massi was instructing Munés in a Caudron G.3 when their aircraft crashed into a farm in Soyapango at 11:30 a.m. after a mechanical failure. Munés survived the crash but Massi was killed.

Munés and Aberle graduated on 12 July 1924 and Salvadoran president Alfonso Quiñónez Molina attended the ceremony. On 27 August 1924, Munés became a pilot in the Salvadoran Army with the rank of sublieutenant. On 16 October 1924, Munés was appointed as a pilot instructor and the chief of pilots of the Salvadoran Aviation Corps (air force). On 15 September 1925, Quiñónez sent a delegation of pilots (including Munés) to Guatemala to deliver a "fraternal greeting" ("fraternal saludo") to the Guatemalan government; Guatemalan president José María Orellana awarded Munés the Medal of Gold for his participation in the visit. On 1 January 1929, Munés represented the Salvadoran government at the inauguration of Nicaraguan president José María Moncada. At some time between 1924 and 1932, Munés flew an aircraft over 5,000 meters (16,000 ft) over the Pacific Ocean, then a record in Central American aviation.

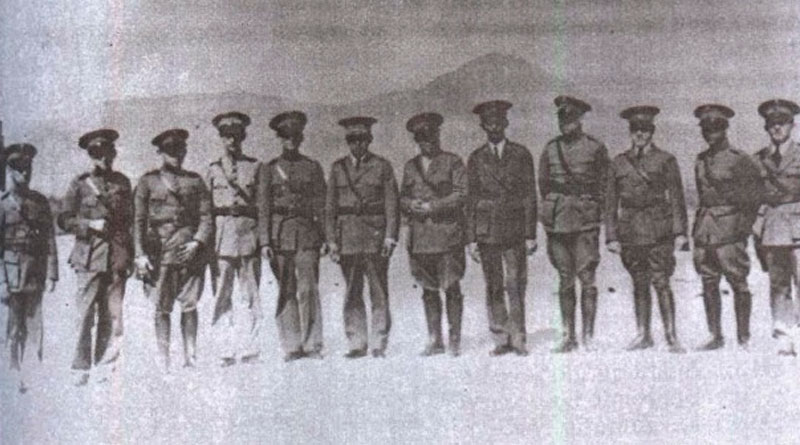
The 1931 Civic Directory, of which Munés was a member; he is the furthest-most right in the image

On 2 December 1931, the Salvadoran military overthrew President Arturo Araujo and established the Civic Directory to govern the country. The military junta consisted of twelve members; Munés represented military aviation in the junta. The Civic Directory dissolved on 4 December and appointed General Maximiliano Hernández Martínez as provisional president. On 8 December 1931, the high command of the Armed Forces of El Salvador (FAES) promoted Munés to serve as the chief of the Salvadoran Aviation Corps. In January 1932, during La Matanza (the massacre of communist and Indigenous rebels following a failed rebellion), Munés ordered the Salvadoran Aviation Corps to carry out reconnaissance and bombing missions of Communist Party positions across the departments of Ahuachapán, La Libertad, Santa Ana, and Sonsonate. La Matanza was the Salvadoran Aviation Corps' first combat engagement.

In 1938, Munés announced that the air force purchased four Caproni light bombers from Fascist Italy. By 1939, Munés was promoted to captain major. On 6 April 1944, Munés became the Director of the Army Instruction. On 15 December 1944, the Legislative Assembly promoted him to the rank of lieutenant colonel. Munés retired from military service in 1951. He served as the governor of La Libertad in 1951.

Munés died on 18 February 1968. In 1983, the Salvadoran government issued a post stamp that depicted Munés and a Salvadoran Air Force biplane.

Military offices
| Preceded by José Trabanino | Commander of the Salvadoran Aviation Corps; 1931–1944 | Succeeded by Herman Barón |
