= 1931 Salvadoran coup d'état =

Military coup that overthrew Salvadoran president Arturo Araujo

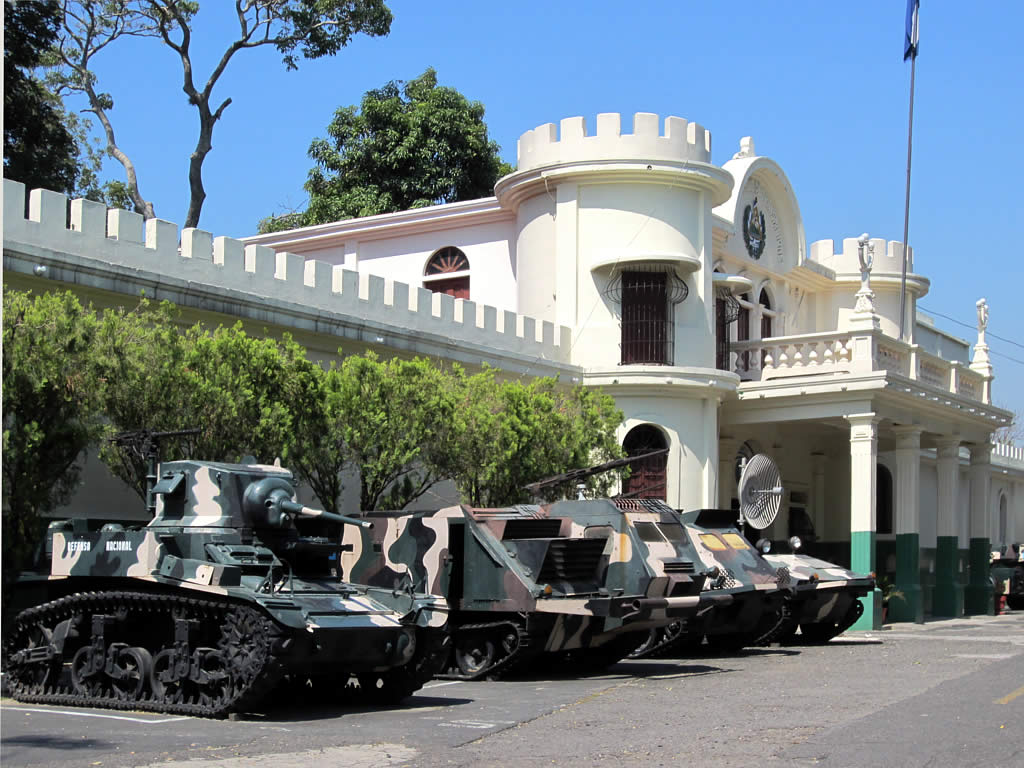
- The El Zapote barracks in San Salvador, where the coup began, as seen in 2012
Date	2 December 1931
Location	El Salvador
Result	Coup successful: President Arturo Araujo overthrown; Civic Directory established

Belligerents
Salvadoran government; Presidential Guard	Armed Forces; Salvadoran Army; Salvadoran Air Force; National Guard

Commanders and leaders
Arturo Araujo	Osmín Aguirre y Salinas; Joaquín Valdés; Maximiliano Hernández Martínez (disputed)

Casualties and losses
At least 1 killed	Unknown

The 1931 Salvadoran coup d'état occurred on 2 December 1931 when the Armed Forces of El Salvador overthrew President Arturo Araujo. The Civic Directory (a military junta) ruled El Salvador for two days after the coup until it relinquished power to Brigadier General Maximiliano Hernández Martínez, Araujo's Vice President and Minister of War, the Navy, and Aviation.

Economic troubles resulting from the Great Depression weakened Araujo's government and forced it to take out loans to finance itself. When Araujo's government suspended all military payments in August 1931, the armed forces began plotting to overthrow Araujo. The military moved to overthrow Araujo on 2 December 1931, and Araujo was forced to flee the country two days later after failing to launch a countercoup. The coup led to almost five decades of military rule in El Salvador, lasting until the 1979 Salvadoran coup d'état.

== Background ==
=== Economic situation ===
On 1 March 1931, Arturo Araujo of the Salvadoran Laborist Party assumed office as the president of El Salvador, after his victory in the presidential election two months prior. During Araujo's presidency, El Salvador's economy continued to struggle as a result of the Great Depression. El Salvador's economy was highly dependent on coffee exports, and from 1928 to 1931, coffee prices decreased by 54 percent. In April 1931, legislator Alberto Masferrer proposed allocating US$500,000 (equivalent to $10,585,339 in 2025) from the national budget to purchase agricultural properties and resell them to workers below market price, but this was opposed by the landowners affected.

In July 1931, high debt led to Araujo and the Legislative Assembly approving a US$2 million (equivalent to $42,341,357 in 2025) foreign loan to finance the government against the advice of Araujo's financial advisors, but the Legislative Assembly was unable to find a willing lender. Around 900 university students protested against the Legislative Assembly as they believed that the legislature was considering approving an additional loan and accusing it of selling out El Salvador to foreigners. The National Guard forcibly suppressed the protest, arresting up to 30 students and injuring many others. Facing continued protests, Araujo called for municipal elections to be held in December 1931 as a concession to the protestors. He also allowed the Communist Party of El Salvador to participate as another concession.

=== Role of the military ===
Elements of the Armed Forces of El Salvador opposed the Meléndez–Quiñónez dynasty of the 1910s to 1920s due to rivalries with the National Guard and payment delays for soldiers and officers. In 1920, President Jorge Meléndez made proposals to the Legislative Assembly to limit the military's role in Salvadoran politics and to have its members accountable to civilian courts, describing the military's role as the "arbiter of social destiny in [El Salvador]" as an "unwise custom". His proposals were opposed by the military and Meléndez never followed up on getting his proposals approved. Military factions attempted coups in February 1922, May 1922, and 1927, but none succeeded.

After the 1931 presidential election, Warren Delano Robbins, the United States ambassador to El Salvador, feared the military would stage a coup as General Antonio Claramount Lucero, a losing candidate, called for one. This did not occur, however, as the military was satisfied with the election of Brigadier General Maximiliano Hernández Martínez as Araujo's vice president. The last successful coup before 1931 occurred in 1898 when General Tomás Regalado overthrew General Rafael Antonio Gutiérrez.

In August 1931, the Salvadoran Laborist Party proposed a bill to the Legislative Assembly to collect military officers' salaries by dismissing those who did not perform active duties. When seven influential military officers stated they would not abide by the bill, the Legislative Assembly abandoned the proposal. Later that month, however, Araujo's government suspended all payments to the military due to a lack of government funds. According to Salvador Peña, a Salvadoran military officer, the military began plotting a coup d'état to overthrow Araujo shortly after the government suspended all military payments.

== Coup ==
At 10 p.m. local time on 2 December 1931, junior military officers initiated the coup d'état to overthrow Araujo's government. The coup began when soldiers of the 1st Infantry Brigade, garrisoned at the El Zapote barracks in San Salvador, attacked the Presidential Palace across the street with machine-gun fire. While the Presidential Guard resisted the rebelling soldiers and defended Araujo, the remainder of San Salvador's military garrisons either ignored or supported the coup.

As the overwhelming attack on the Presidential Palace continued, Araujo and several of his government officials fled San Salvador. In the process, the rebelling soldiers shot and killed José Espinosa, the Minister of Finance. Araujo arrived in Santa Tecla where he planned to initiate a countercoup, however, the barracks' soldiers opposed his continuance as president. He then fled to Santa Ana where he rallied a few hundred supporters. Ultimately, Araujo concluded his forces in Santa Ana would be unable to regain power; he resigned from the presidency, named Salvador López Rochac (the first presidential designate) as his successor, and fled the country to Guatemala on 4 December 1931. In Guatemala, Araujo received protection from President Jorge Ubico, but he was eventually expelled from the country by Ubico after he attempted to rally an army to retake power.

== Aftermath ==
=== Political ramifications ===
During the coup, military officers from the army, air force, and National Guard established the Civic Directory, a military junta, to govern the country. The Civic Directory consisted of twelve military officers, (Note: The twelve military officers who composed the Civic Directory were colonels Osmín Aguirre y Salinas, Juan Vicente Vidal, and Joaquín Valdés; captains Manuel Urbina and Visitación Antonio Pacheco; lieutenants Joaquín Castro Canizales and Carlos Rodríguez; and sub-lieutenants Julio Cañas, José Alonso Huezo, Miguel Hernández Saldaña, Héctor Montalvo, and Juan Ramón Munés.) and was led by colonels Osmín Aguirre y Salinas (Vice Minister of War, the Navy, and Aviation) and Joaquín Valdés (deputy commander of the National Guard) as co-chairmen. The Civic Directory dissolved itself on 4 December 1931 and relinquished power to Vice President Martínez, who was also serving as Minister of War, the Navy, and Aviation. Martínez's role in the coup is disputed. Martínez's supporters argue he was not involved in the coup and was only given the presidency as mandated by the country's constitution; his opponents argue he organized the coup. Martínez was arrested during the coup, but his opponents argue Martínez's arrest was fabricated to legitimize his presidency.

The 1931 coup established a military dictatorship that ruled El Salvador for almost five decades. Martínez pushed out many of the junior officers who led the coup and replaced them with loyal members of the military's old guard. Martínez ruled El Salvador as president until 1944 when he resigned following the Strike of Fallen Arms, but the military continued to rule the country through rigged elections until the 1979 coup d'état that led to the Salvadoran Civil War. In fact, the municipal elections Araujo promised to hold in December 1931 were postponed for one month by Martínez's government. Races where the communists won had their results suspended.

=== Constitutionality and recognition ===
According to article 92 of the constitution of El Salvador, Araujo's departure from El Salvador without permission from the Legislative Assembly automatically forfeited his presidency to the vice president (Martínez). Araujo's resignation to López Rochac was unconstitutional as he attempted to circumvent giving the presidency to the vice president as mandated by article 81. Additionally, articles 36 and 132 of the constitution granted the armed forces the "right to insurrection", and according to Charles B. Curtis, the United States ambassador to El Salvador, this article made the coup "entirely constitutional".

Despite assessing the coup as being constitutional, Curtis described the coup's leaders as "little more than halfwitted" and "utterly irresponsible youths" who had "no capacity and no fixed plan beyond getting rid of [Araujo's] government". The United States government refused to recognize Martínez's government as to do so violated the 1923 Central American Treaty of Peace and Amity, which prohibited signatories from recognizing governments formed through coups. The United States pressured Martínez to resign, but by January 1934, the United States had formally recognized Martínez as El Salvador's president.

=== Historical assessment ===
United States Federal Research Division historian Richard Haggerty described the coup as a "watershed" event in Salvadoran history. Historian Michael Krennerich described both the coup and the subsequent La Matanza (a January 1932 military-instigated massacre that killed up to 40,000 peasants) as "landmarks in the history of the country".
