= Civic Directory =

Salvadoran military junta from 2 to 4 December 1931

- Military junta of El Salvador

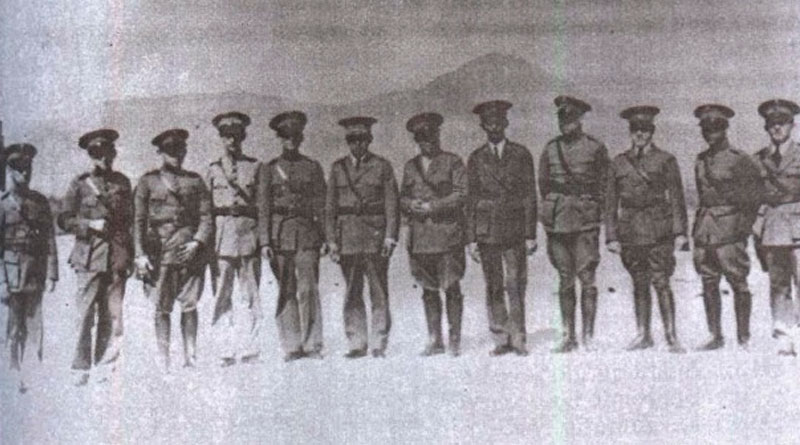
- The members of the Civic Directory
- Date formed: 2 December 1931
- Date dissolved: 4 December 1931

People and organisations
- Chairmen: Colonel Osmín Aguirre y Salinas; Colonel Joaquín Valdés
- No. of ministers: 12
- Member party: Armed Forces of El Salvador

The Civic Directory (Spanish: Directorio Cívico) was a military junta which governed El Salvador from 2 to 4 December 1931. The junta was composed of twelve members of the Armed Forces from the Army, Air Force, and National Guard. The directory marked the beginning of the era of military dictatorship in El Salvador which lasted until October 1979 with the 1979 coup d'état and the establishment of the Revolutionary Government Junta, a joint civilian-military government which ruled until 1982.

== Background ==
=== 1931 general election ===
In early-January 1931, El Salvador held its first fair and free democratic election in its history. Of the six candidates, the military supported the candidacy of Doctor Alberto Gómez Zárate, who served as the minister of national defense from 1927 to 1930 during the presidency of Pío Romero Bosque. Gómez Zárate's primary opponent was Arturo Araujo, an engineer, coffee planter, and rancher of the Labor Party who promised agricultural reforms and the industrialization of the country. Araujo had the support of the United States. A third contender was General Maximiliano Hernández Martínez of the National Republican Party, although, he later ended his campaign to be the vice presidential candidate for Araujo.

The election resulted in a victory for Araujo and Hernández Martínez, who won 106,777 votes against Gómez Zárate's 64,280 votes. Although the United States was wary of the military's intentions following the election, the military remained loyal to Araujo, mostly due to Hernández Martínez's presence in his administration.

=== Araujo's presidency ===
During his presidency, which began on 1 March 1931, was faced by economic troubles due to the Great Depression, waning political support leading to social unrest, and over time, growing military disloyalty. Throughout his presidency, the military's loyalty depended on Hernández Martínez's position as vice president and minister of national defense.

In late-1931, Araujo attempted to reduce the budget of the military and issued orders to some military officials to retire in an attempt to improve the country's economy. His attempts, however, were strongly resisted by the military, and when his administration failed to adequately pay the military, the armed forces staged a coup d'état against Araujo's administration on 2 December 1931, forcing Araujo to flee the country to the United States. The coup was solely orchestrated by the military without any influence from the country's politicians.

== History of the junta ==
In the aftermath of the coup, the military established a military junta called the Civic Directory to govern the country. The junta was composed of twelve members, all of whom were military officers. It was led by Colonels Osmín Aguirre y Salinas and Joaquín Valdés, who served as co-chairmen. Aguirre y Salinas also served as minister of national defense under the junta.

On 4 December 1931, only two days after the coup which deposed Araujo and established the Civic Directory, the junta dissolved itself. Despite having no direct role in the coup, even being detained by the military during the coup, Hernández Martínez as the country's acting president. The 1931 coup led to the start of 48 years of military rule in El Salvador.

=== United States opposition to the junta ===
In assessment of the junta, Charles B. Curtis, the minister of the United States to El Salvador, remarked that the junta's members were "half-witted" and "utterly irresponsible youths," adding that they had "no fixed plan beyond getting rid of the present government." The United States Department of State announced that it would not recognize the military government in accordance with the 1923 Central American Treaty of Peace and Amity. The United States kept its position of not recognizing the military government after Hernández Martínez was installed as acting president, a position which was also held by the government of Costa Rica, another signatory of the treaty. The United States only recognized the military government on 26 January 1934, over two years after the coup and the Civic Directory being dissolved.

== Junta members ==
The Civic Directory was composed of twelve military officers from the army, air force, and National Guard.

=== Army ===
First Infantry Regiment

- Captain Manuel Urbina
- Captain Visitación Antonio Pacheco
- Lieutenant Joaquín Castro Canizales

First Artillery Regiment

- Lieutenant Carlos Rodríguez
- Second Lieutenant Julio Cañas

First Machine Gun Regiment

- Second Lieutenant José Alonso Huezo
- Second Lieutenant Miguel Hernández Saldaña

Cavalry Regiment

- Lieutenant Héctor Montalvo

Ministry of National Defense

- Colonel Osmín Aguirre y Salinas, served as co-chairman as minister of national defense

=== Air Force ===
- Second Lieutenant Juan Ramón Munés

=== National Guard ===
- Colonel Joaquín Valdés, served as co-chairman
- Colonel Juan Vicente Vidal

== See also ==
- 1931 in El Salvador

Political offices
| Preceded by Arturo Araujo | Presidency of El Salvador (provisional); 1931 | Succeeded by Maximiliano Hernández Martínez (acting) |
