= Gina María Balibrera =

Salvadoran-American novelist

- Education: University of Michigan (MFA)
- Occupation: Novelist

Gina María Balibrera is a Salvadoran-American novelist.

Balibrera was born to a Salvadoran immigrant family and grew up in San Francisco. She became interested in writing at a young age, and considered herself to be a writer by the time she was in high school. In 2011, Balibrera began attending graduate school at the University of Michigan as part of the Helen Zell Writers' Program, later becoming a Zell Postgraduate Fellow in fiction.

Her work has appeared in Boston Review, Ploughshares, and Michigan Quarterly Review. Her short story "Álvaro" won the 2017 Aura Estrada Short Story Contest. She was an editor at The Offing.

In 2020, she was a Sandra Cisneros Fellow.

Her 2024 novel, The Volcano Daughters, follows two Salvadoran sisters in the 1930s during and after La Matanza.

== Works ==
- The Volcano Daughters. Pantheon. August 20, 2024. ISBN 978-0-593-31723-5.
