= Andrés Ignacio Menéndez =

President of El Salvador (1934–1935; 1944)

Brigadier General Andrés Ignacio Menéndez
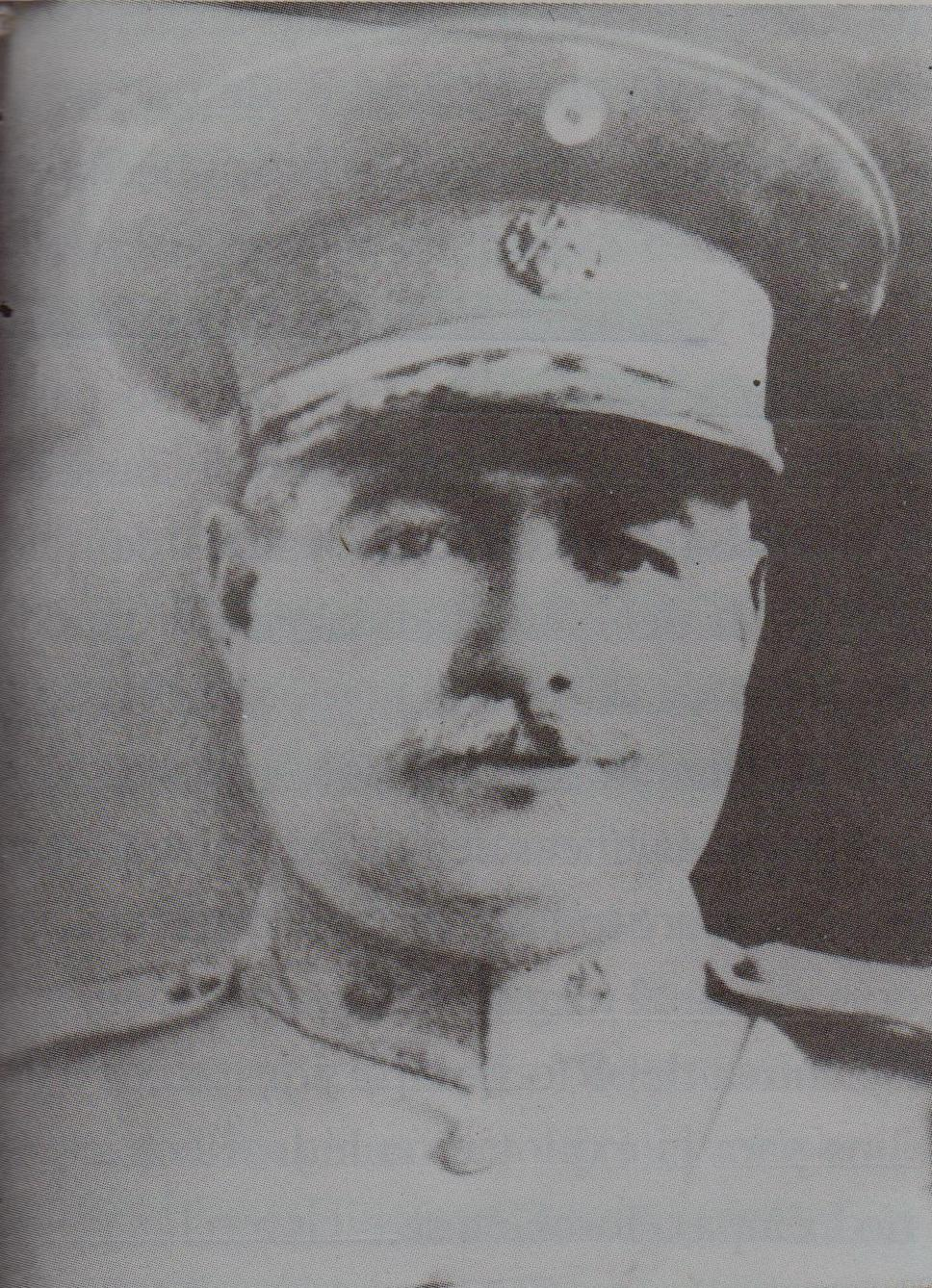

President of El Salvador
- In office 9 May 1944 – 21 October 1944; Provisional President
- Preceded by: Maximiliano Hernández Martínez
- Succeeded by: Osmín Aguirre y Salinas (provisional)
- In office 29 August 1934 – 1 March 1935; Provisional President
- Preceded by: Maximiliano Hernández Martínez (provisional)
- Succeeded by: Maximiliano Hernández Martínez

30th Minister of War, the Navy, and Aviation of El Salvador
- In office 1 March 1935 – 9 May 1944
- Preceded by: Maximiliano Hernández Martínez (acting)
- Succeeded by: Fidel Cristino Garay (acting)
- In office 1 April 1934 – 29 August 1934; Acting Minister
- Preceded by: Joaquín Valdés (acting)
- Succeeded by: Maximiliano Hernández Martínez (acting)

Personal details
- Born: 1 February 1879 Santa Ana, El Salvador
- Died: 7 or 13 June 1962 (aged 83) New York City, United States
- Spouse: Catalina Carballo
- Occupation: Military officer, politician

Military service
- Allegiance: El Salvador
- Branch/service: Salvadoran Army
- Years of service: 1898–1944
- Rank: Brigadier general

Andrés Ignacio Menéndez (1 February 1879 – 7 or 13 June 1962) was a Salvadoran military officer and politician who served as provisional president of El Salvador from 1934 to 1935 and in 1944. He also served as El Salvador's defense minister from 1935 to 1944.

== Biography ==
Andrés Ignacio Menéndez was born on 1 February 1879 in Santa Ana, El Salvador. He married Catalina Carballo. Menéndez rose through the ranks in the Salvadoran Army, becoming sub-lieutenant on 18 October 1898; lieutenant on 24 March 1904; captain on 1 August 1906; major captain on 24 May 1907; lieutenant colonel on 20 May 1911; colonel on 21 May 1915; and brigadier general on 10 August 1920.

On 2 April 1934, President Brigadier General Maximiliano Hernández Martínez appointed Menéndez as Minister of War, the Navy, and Aviation (minister of war). On 29 August, Menéndez became the provisional president of El Salvador after Martínez resigned to run in the 1935 presidential election. Martínez won the election and he assumed office on 1 March 1935. That day, Martínez reappointed Menéndez as minister of war.

Menéndez became the first presidential designate in April 1944 after the failed Palm Sunday Coup. Martínez resigned during the Strike of Fallen Arms on 9 May and Menéndez became provisional president. Menéndez was overthrown in a coup led by Colonel Osmín Aguirre y Salinas on 21 October.

Menéndez died on 7 or 13 June 1962 in the Mount Sinai Hospital in New York City, United States. His remains were returned to El Salvador and he was buried in the General Cemetery of San Salvador.

== Dates of ranks ==
The following is a list of Menéndez's military ranks during his career.

Insignia	Rank	Service branch	Date of promotion
Sub-lieutenant	Sub-lieutenant	Army	18 October 1898
Lieutenant	Lieutenant	Army	24 March 1904
Captain	Captain	Army	1 August 1906
Major captain	Major captain	Army	24 May 1907
Lieutenant colonel	Lieutenant colonel	Army	20 May 1911
Colonel	Colonel	Army	21 May 1915
General	Brigadier general	Army	10 August 1920

Political offices
Preceded by Joaquín Valdés (acting)	Minister of War, the Navy, and Aviation of El Salvador; 1934	Succeeded by Maximiliano Hernández Martínez (acting)
Preceded by Maximiliano Hernández Martínez (provisional)	President of El Salvador; 1934–1935 (provisional)	Succeeded by Maximiliano Hernández Martínez
Preceded by Maximiliano Hernández Martínez (acting)	Minister of War, the Navy, and Aviation of El Salvador; 1935–1944	Succeeded by Fidel Cristino Garay (acting)
Preceded by Maximiliano Hernández Martínez	President of El Salvador (provisional); 1944	Succeeded by Osmín Aguirre y Salinas (provisional)
