= Captain Guillermo Reynaldo Cortez Military Aviation School =

Military aviation school in El Salvador

Captain P.A. Guillermo Reynaldo Cortez Military Aviation School Escuela de Aviación Militar "Capitán P.A. Guillermo Reynaldo Cortez"

Location
- Ilopango International Airport, Ilopango; El Salvador
- Coordinates: 13°41′37″N 89°07′17″W

Information
- Former name: Military Aviation School
- Type: Military academy, flight school
- Motto: Todo por mi Patria (Spanish) (Everything for my Fatherland)
- Established: 1923 (first iteration); 10 December 1983 (current form)
- Authority: Salvadoran Air Force
- Language: Spanish
- Website: www.fas.gob.sv/eam/index.html

Captain P.A. Guillermo Reynaldo Cortez Military Aviation School (Spanish: Escuela de Aviación Military "Capitán P.A. Guillermo Reynaldo Cortez") is a military academy and flight school located at the Ilopango International Airport in Ilopango, El Salvador.

== History ==
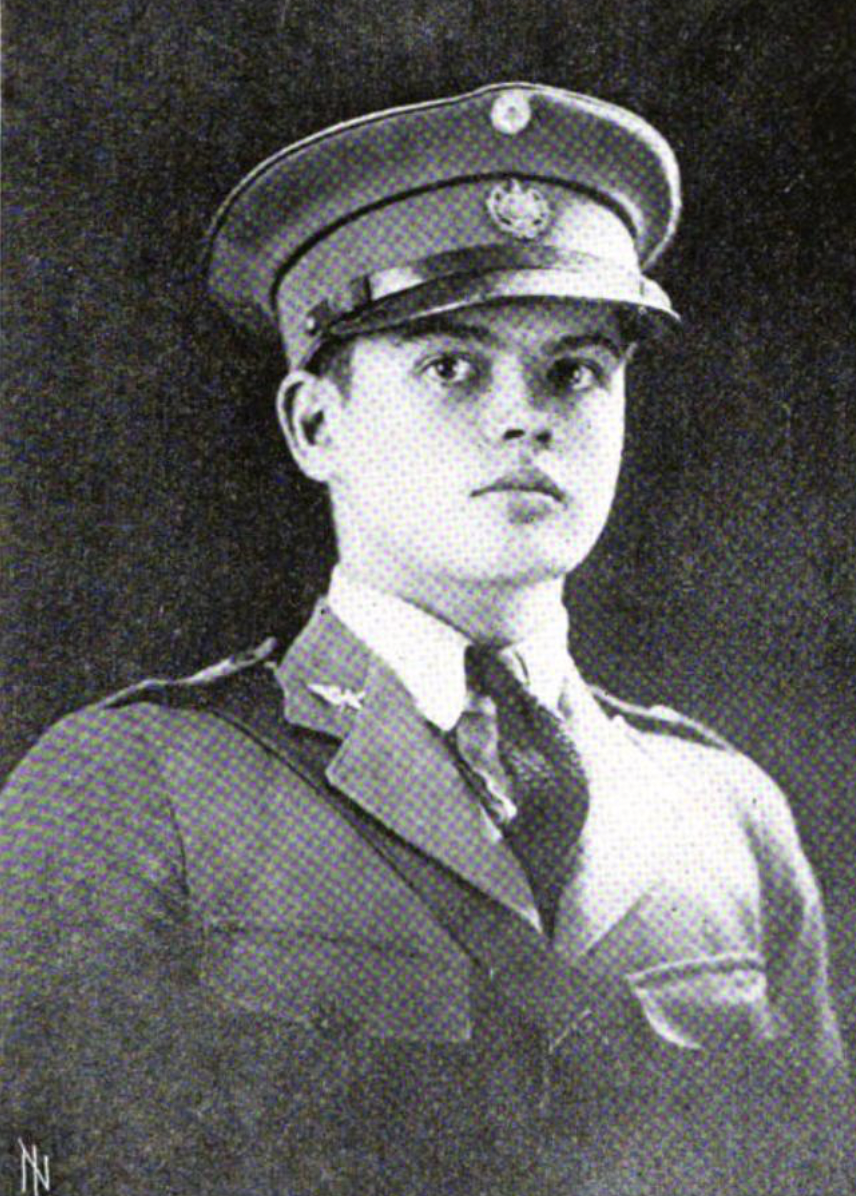
Ricardo Arbele, one of the Military Aviation School's first graduates

The Military Aviation School was established in 1923 shortly after the establishment of the Salvadoran Air Fleet. Sub-lieutenants Juan Ramón Munés and Ricardo Aberle graduated as the flight school's first pilots on 12 July 1924. On 10 December 1983, Executive Decree No. 95 reorganized the Military Aviation School as the Captain P.A. Guillermo Reynaldo Cortez Military Aviation School at it resumed operations on 2 March 1985. The flight school is named after Guillermo Reynaldo Cortez, a Salvadoran pilot who was killed in action during the 1969 Football War.

== Equipment ==
The Captain P.A. Guillermo Reynaldo Cortez Military Aviation School operates the Bell UH-1H Iroquois, ENAER T-35 Pillán, and Schweizer S300.
