= Embassy of the United States, San Salvador =

Embassy of the United States, San Salvador Embajada de los Estados Unidos en San Salvador

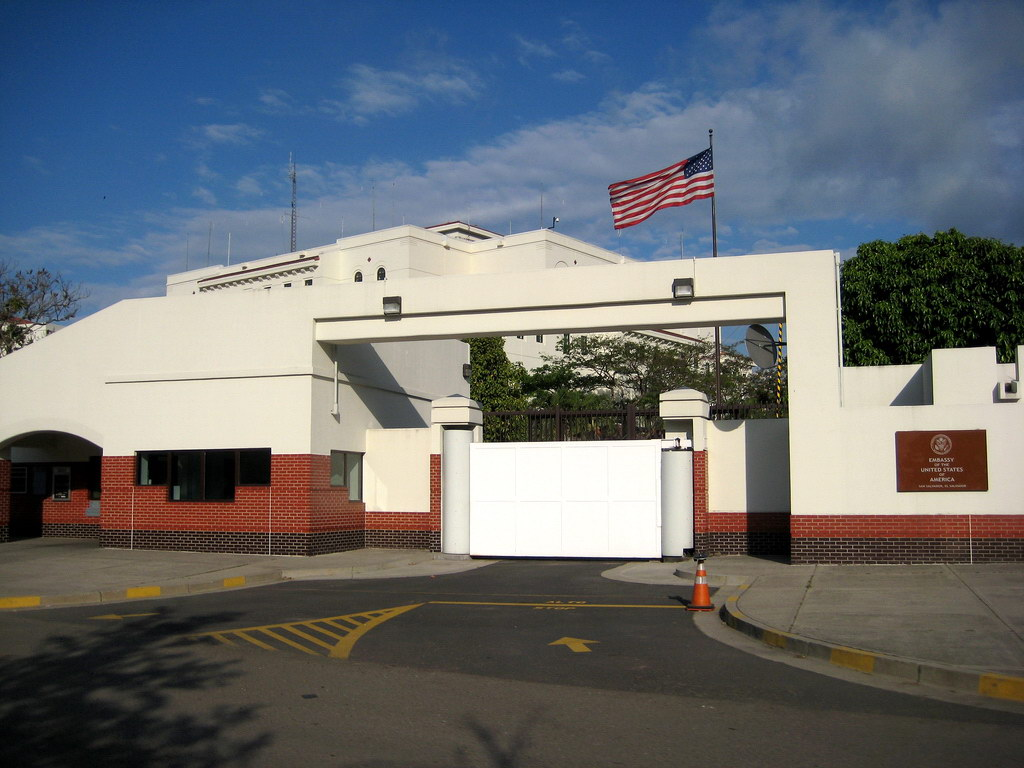
- Location: Antiguo Cuscatlán, El Salvador
- Address: Final del bulevar de Santa Elena
- Coordinates: 13°39′50″N 89°15′29″W
- Website: https://sv.usembassy.gov/

The Embassy of the United States in El Salvador is located in Antiguo Cuscatlán. The Ambassador of the United States to El Salvador is William H. Duncan from since 2023.

== History ==
El Salvador and the other Central American provinces declared independence from Spain in 1821, and in 1823 formed the United Provinces of Central America. The United States recognized the independence of the Federation of Central American States from Spain on August 4, 1824. El Salvador became an independent republic in 1839. The United States recognized El Salvador as an independent state on May 1, 1849.

The American Legation in San Salvador was opened under Minister Resident James R. Partridge on June 15, 1863. Following the 1931 Salvadoran coup d'état, normal relations between the United States and El Salvador were disrupted as the United States did not recognize the new revolutionary government, adhering to a policy of non-recognition of governments established via revolution, as outlined by a 1923 treaty.

This non-recognition period ended on January 26, 1934, when the United States recognized the Martinez Government of El Salvador. Diplomatic relations were restored, and on March 23, 1943, the United States raised the status of its legation in El Salvador to an embassy. Walter Thurston presented his credentials as Ambassador Extraordinary and Plenipotentiary on April 16, 1943.

=== 1979 storming ===
On October 31, 1979, 300 leftist protesters attempted to storm the Embassy. While protesters were able to jump the embassy fence, none were able to make in into the building. After 45 minutes, troops from the Salvadoran Army repulsed the crowd with tear gas. Despite the use of firearms and Molotov cocktails, only two US Marines were slightly wounded during the attack. It is unknown if there were any casualties amongst the protesters.

== See also ==
- El Salvador–United States relations
- Embassy of El Salvador, Washington, D.C.
- List of ambassadors of the United States to El Salvador
