= National Police of El Salvador =

El Salvador law enforcement agency (1867-1992)

National Police of El Salvador Policía Nacional de El Salvador
- Common name: National Police, Policía Nacional
- Abbreviation: PN

Agency overview
- Formed: 1867
- Dissolved: 16 January 1992
- Superseding agency: National Civil Police

Jurisdictional structure
- Operations jurisdiction: El Salvador
- General nature: Military police

The National Police of El Salvador (Spanish: Policía Nacional de El Salvador), abbreviated as the PN, was the national law enforcement agency of El Salvador from 1867 to 1992.

== History ==
The National Police of El Salvador was established in 1867 during the presidency of Francisco Dueñas. The National Police was expanded in 1883 and again in 1888 in response to increased tensions between the Salvadoran citizens and indigenous Indians.

In the Chapultepec Peace Accords signed on 16 January 1992, the National Police was dissolved, along with the National Guard and the Treasury Police, and replaced by the National Civil Police. In accordance to the peace accords, one fifth of the National Civil Police was composed of former members of the National Police. Another one fifth was composed of members of the guerrilla group Farabundo Martí National Liberation Front and the remaining three fifths was composed of neutral parties.
