= 1923 Central American Treaty of Peace and Amity =

Peace treaty between five Central American nations

Treaty of Peace and Amity
General Treaty of Peace and Amity, 1923
- Type: Regional peace treaty
- Context: End of the 1907 Treaty
- Signed: 7 February 1923
- Location: Washington D.C., United States
- Expiry: 1932 (Note: The Treaty was denounced by El Salvador in Costa Rica in 1932.); 1934 (Note: The Treaty was denounced by the Central American Court of Justice in 1934.)
- Signatories: Costa Rica; El Salvador; Guatemala; Honduras; Nicaragua
- Ratifiers: Costa Rica; Guatemala; Nicaragua

The 1923 Central American Treaty of Peace and Amity, officially known as the General Treaty of Peace and Amity, 1923, was a treaty signed by the five nations of Central America in 1923 which established that all nations would denounce and not recognize any government which arose in any of the five signatory nations through illegal means (i.e.: coup d'état, revolution). The treaty remained effective from its signing on 7 February 1923 until it was denounced by the Central American Court of Justice in 1934.

== History ==
A similar treaty was signed and ratified in the 1907 Central American Treaty of Peace and Amity but the treaty fell apart in 1917 when Nicaragua denounced the treaty.

The five nations of Costa Rica, El Salvador, Guatemala, Honduras, and Nicaragua agreed to draft a new treaty with a similar function and were invited by United States President Warren G. Harding on 4 December 1922 to draft and sign the treaty in Washington D.C. The treaty outlined that no signatory nation would recognize any government which arose in any other signatory nation which rose to power via a revolution or a coup d'état. The treaty also outlawed the signing of any secret treaties between nations, outlawed radical changing of Constitutions, banned nations from intervening in civil wars, and reaffirming the legitimacy of the Central American Court of Justice. The treaty also placed limitations of military and naval armaments.

The United States did not sign the treaty, but did follow its terms as displayed when the it refused to recognize the change of government in El Salvador when General Maximiliano Hernández Martínez overthrew the democratically elected President, Arturo Araujo, on 2 December 1931. The United States' initial refusal to recognize Hernández Martínez's government, however, led to the eventual collapse of the treaty since in 1932, both Costa Rica and El Salvador denounced the treaty on 23 December and 26 December, respectively. Although El Salvador never ratified the treaty, Costa Rica did, leaving the treaty with only Guatemala and Nicaragua as its only legal adherents, since Honduras never ratified it either.

In 1934, the Central American Court of Justice denounced the treaty, effectively ending its legality in all five nations.

== Contents of the Treaty ==
=== Article I ===
The governments of the high contracting parties shall not recognize any other governments which may come into power in any of the five Republics as a consequence of a coup d'état, or of a revolution against the recognized government, so long as the freely elected representatives of the people thereof, have not constitutionally reorganized the country.

=== Article II ===
Desiring to make secure in the Republics of Central America the benefits which are derived from the maintenance of free institutions and to contribute at the same time toward strengthening their stability and the prestige with which they should be surrounded, they declare that every act, disposition or measure which alters the constitutional organization in any of them is to be deemed a menace to the peace of said Republics, whether it proceeded from any public power of from the private citizens.

Consequently, the governments of the contracting parties will not recognize any other governments which may come into power in any of the five Republics through a coup d'état or a revolution against a recognized government, so long as the freely elected representatives of the people thereof, have not constitutionally reorganized the country. And even in such a case they obligate themselves not to acknowledge the recognition of any of the persons elected as President, Vice President or Chief of State designate should fall under any of the following heads:

(1) If he should be the leader or one of the leaders of a coup d'état or revolution, or through blood relationship or marriage, be an ascendent or descendant or brother of such leader or leaders.

(2) If he should have been a Secretary of State or should have held some high military command during the accomplishment of the coup d'état, the revolution, or while the election was being carried on, or if he should have held this office or command within the six months proceeding the coup d'état, revolution, or the election.

Furthermore, in no case shall recognition be accorded to a government which arises from election to power of a citizen expressly and unquestionably disqualified by the Constitution of his country as eligible to election as President, Vice President or State designate.

== Signatories ==
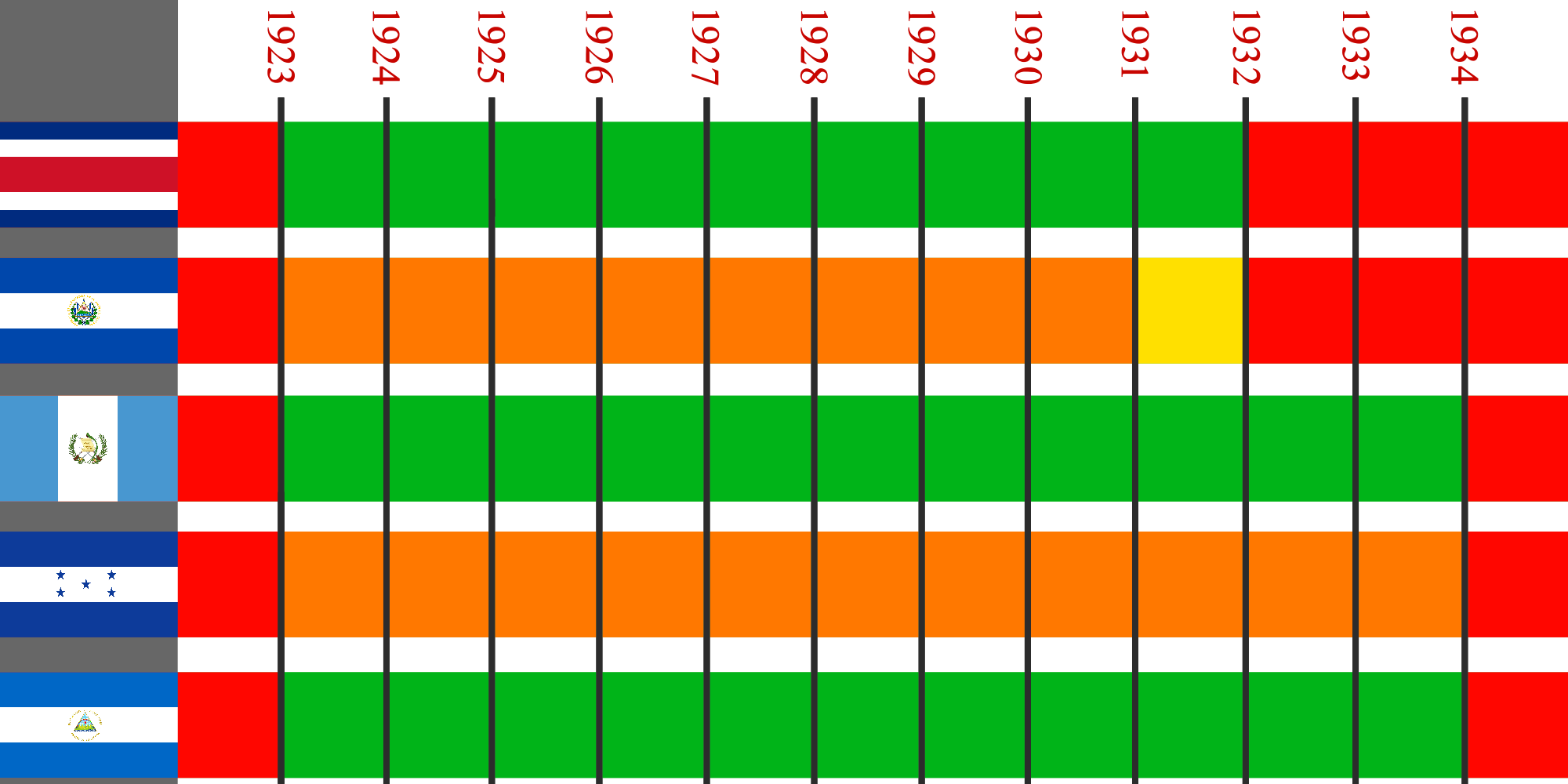
Timeline of membership. Non-member of the treaty. Non-ratified member of the treaty. Ratified member of the treaty. Member, ratified or non-ratified, of the treaty with an illegal government according to the treaty.

The following five nations signed the treaty.

- Costa Rica
- El Salvador
- Guatemala
- Honduras
- Nicaragua

Despite signing the treaty, neither El Salvador nor Honduras actually ratified the treaty.

=== Timeline of Membership ===
- 7 February 1923 – The treaty was signed by Costa Rica, El Salvador, Guatemala, Honduras, and Nicaragua. Only Costa Rica, Guatemala, and Nicaragua ratified the treaty.
- 2 December 1931 – The Salvadoran government was overthrown by the military, establishing a government which was illegal according to the treaty.
- 23 December 1932 – President Ricardo Jiménez Oreamuno of Costa Rica denounced the treaty.
- 26 December 1932 – President Maximiliano Hernández Martínez of El Salvador denounced the treaty.
- 1934 – The Central American Court of Justice denounced the treaty.

== See also ==
- 1907 Central American Treaty of Peace and Amity
