= 1932 Salvadoran legislative election =

- 12–14 January 1932
- All 42 seats in the Legislative Assembly; 22 seats needed for a majority
| Party | Leader | Vote % | Seats | +/– |
|---|---|---|---|---|
| Pro-Government | Maximiliano Hernández Martínez | | 42 | |
This lists parties that won seats. See the complete results below.
| President of the National Assembly before | President of the National Assembly after |
|---|---|
| José Manuel Olano; Laborist | José Honorato Villacorta; Pro-Government |

Legislative elections were held in El Salvador between 12 and 14 January 1932. The government had promised free and fair elections and invited all parties, including the Communist Party, to compete. However, voters had to be registered in their municipalities alongside their party, giving the government a list of Communist Party members. In the preceding municipal elections on 3–5 January the Communists won several predominantly indigenous municipalities in the west of the country. Maximiliano Hernández Martínez cancelled the planned second round of the legislative and municipal elections due to the Communist success. The conservative Progressive Fraternal Party boycotted the elections in San Salvador on the grounds of electoral fraud.

== Bibliography ==
- Alvarenga Venutolo, Patricia. Cultura y etica de la violencia. San José: EDUCA. Based on her dissertation, Reshaping the ethics of power: a history of violence in El Salvador (1994). 1996.
- Bland, Gary. "Assessing the transition to democracy." Tulchin, Joseph S. with Gary Bland, eds. 1992. Is there a transition to democracy in El Salvador? Boulder: Westview Press (Woodrow Wilson Center current studies on Latin America). 1992.
- Grieb, Kenneth J. "The United States and the rise of General Maximiliano Hernández Martínez." Journal of Latin American studies 3, 2:151-172 (November 1971). 1971.
- Larde y Larín, Jorge. Guía Histórica de El Salvador. San Salvador: Ministerio de Culture. 1958.
- Political Handbook of the world, 1932. New York, 1933.
- Vidal, Manuel. Nociones de historia de Centro América (especial para El Salvador). San Salvador: Ministerio de Educación. Ninth edition. 1970.
