= National Guard (El Salvador) =

National Guard Guardia Nacional
- Arm Patch of the Guardia Nacional
- Motto: El Honor es Nuestra Divisa; Honour is Our Emblem

Agency overview
- Formed: 1912
- Dissolved: 1992

Jurisdictional structure
- National agency (Operations jurisdiction): El Salvador
- Operations jurisdiction: El Salvador
- Legal jurisdiction: As per operations jurisdiction
- General nature: Gendarmerie

Operational structure
- Headquarters: San Salvador

The National Guard (Spanish: Guardia Nacional) was the national gendarmerie of El Salvador.

The National Guard of El Salvador was founded in 1912 by President Dr. Manuel Enrique Araujo as a branch of the Salvadoran Army for policing rural areas. The National Guard was reorganized into a separate civilian force based on the Spanish Civil Guard, and served with distinction during the Football War. The National Guard developed a reputation for police brutality and human rights abuses in El Salvador, and was disbanded on 16 January 1992 as part of the Chapultepec Peace Accords to end the Salvadoran Civil War.

== History ==
Owing to increased demands for higher wages by coffee pickers in rural areas, Salvadoran land owners in the countryside felt the need to create a special public security force to protect their interests. Previous law enforcement and task force efforts failed to yield satisfactory results. The task forces were patrolling soldiers, commanded by an army officer, scattered throughout the country. They were unprepared in the fight against crime in its various guises, and were thus incapable of stopping thefts, killings, rapes and so on. Criminals of that era were using topographical features to hide from the authorities.

This was the primary reason that prompted President Manuel Enrique Araujo, to create the National Guard. A corps made up of specially trained men with modern equipment and uniformed appropriately for the type of coffee plantations where they were going to act was needed. Furthermore, it was legally constituted to support its actions and proceedings against the offenders to extend the scope of justice to the most remote areas.

Dr. Araujo gave the Engineer and General José María Peralta Lagos, Minister of War and Navy, to study the organization and functioning of the police forces of Europe.

Peralta Lagos, a graduate of the Military Academy of Spain in 1897, used, Spanish Guardia Civil as a model on February 3, 1912, by Executive Order, in the Department of the Interior, at the facilities occupied by the Sixth Infantry Regiment and later by the Ecole Normale "Alberto Masferrer," the National Guard was formally established.

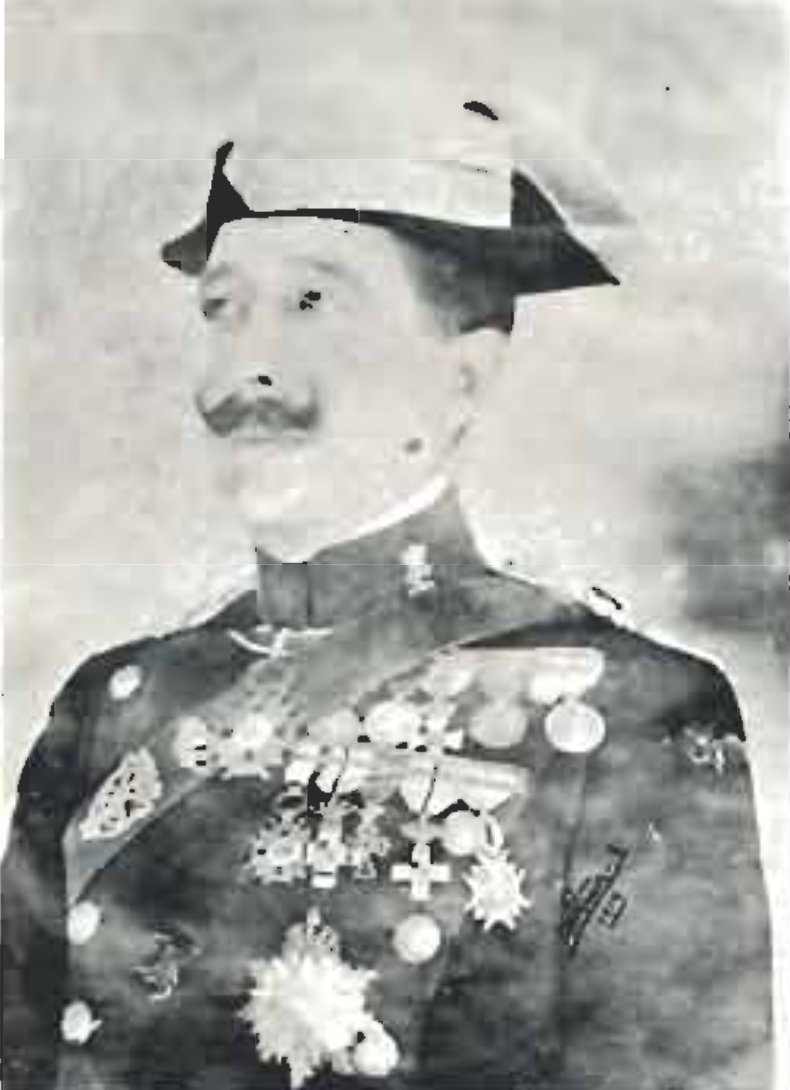
Alfonso Martín Garrido

Earlier this year the Government engaged the services of Spanish captain Alfonso Martín Garrido, to organize the National Guard. Garrido previously had served as Inspector General of the National Police, and was assimilated into the Salvadoran army as a colonel. This Spaniard, with vast experience in the Spanish military, was the first director general of the National Guard.

The first standard uniforms used by the National Guard was khaki colored, worn with long pants, with metal buttons running down the front and emblems of the neck. The shoes, leggings and equipment belts were all brown. A felt hat was worn until 1918, when it was changed to straw, which was worn until 1924. These hats were worn with the left wing brim bent upward which carryed a fabric Cockade in the colors of the Flag of El Salvador, the Cockade was changed to metal. The issued weapon was the 7mm Spanish Mauser rifle which was used until 1924. This dress was an early idea of Colonel Garrido.

The first regulation of the National Guard were issued on Sept. 25, 1912, and they were in force until April 12, 1924.

The National Guard in the early depended on the Secretaría de Gobernación (Interior Ministry), but it was the Secretary of War which will provide all resources necessary for its functions and organization.

Over the years, the National Guard, was more and more involved with the life of the nation when on Aug. 20, 1914, it became part of the active Army as a "Special Corps of the Army".

One of his functions as Special Corps under Art. 1 of its Organic Law, was to deliver its services with one faction in properly selected Presidential House.

=== First reorganization ===
In mid-1914, the President of the Republic, Dr. Alfonso Quiñónez Molina, brought from Spain a second mission of the Spanish Civil Guard to reorganize the National Guard. The mission was composed of Colonel Jose Tomas Romeu and the Captains Cenjor Manuel Pizarro and Andres Manuel Lopez, who were assimilated into the ranks of lieutenant colonel and colonel respectively.

Under the reorganization, uniforms and equipment were also changed. Khaki cork helmets were introduced, replacing the hats, on which were placed numbers corresponding to each National Guardsman's number, above which was a badge depicting the National Guard insignia and its coat of arms.

The Spanish Mauser rifle was replaced by the 7.92×57mm Czech Mauser rifle, which remained in use until 1961. The Corps carried the carterón (a small book) in the field where they took the documents and records relating to the capture of criminals, investigation of reports and information of all kinds.

On December 29, 1924, Director Col. Tomas presented to the Executive the "Cartilla de Servicio de la Guardia Nacional" (the Records Service of the National Guard) which was approved on the same date. Previously, on Aug. 2, 1923, the "Reglamento de Premios para Clases y Guardias" (Regulations of Awards for Classes and Guards) had been approved.

This mission also created the "School of National Guardsmen Gral. e Ing. and Ing. José María Peralta Lagos", officially inaugurated on July 14, 1924, under the leadership of Lieutenant General Jose Mauricio Lopez Escobar.

The Guards' School soon began to bear fruit, but years later disappeared due to lack of funds for its upkeep, Subsequently, the Company of Instruction was established, which then forged National Guard. On February 3, 1974, at the direction of Colonel Jose Mario Rosales and Rosales, Director General of the National Guard renamed the Educational Center with its original name of "National Guards School Gral. e Ing. José María Peralta Lagos", in memory of one of the main founders of this rural police force.

"La Matanza", a massacre in January–February 1932 of an estimated 10,000 Salvadoran peasant farmers, was carried out principally by units of the Salvadoran National Guard, with assistance from the Salvadoran army.

The National Guard officers chain was created in 1936, however, in view of its new Organic Law, this chain was repealed and their chiefs and officers, went to the Army's promotion chain. The needs of the service which caused the National Guard to serve as a Military Corps, however, be subject by nature of their services to specific laws and regulations, was also subject to the laws governing the functions of the Army .

On September 25, 1934, the new Organic Law of the National Guard was promulgated, and on February 3, 1936, came the Regulations for the Implementation of the Basic Law, on the occasion of 24th anniversary of its founding.

The National Guard, despite being a military body that was part of the Army, as per the Executive Decrees of August 20, 1914 and the March 30, 1935, was attached to the Public Security Branch, reason by which the General Salvador Castaneda Castro, President of the Republic, through Decree No. 32 dated August 16, 1946 ordered to move to the Defense Industry.

In order to prepare its members for promotion to the next higher level, the Feb. 19, 1947 was an Extension Course for elements of the Army National Guard, military and civilian professors. This empowered to take the respective exams, according to the Law on Promotions and Military Testing Programs, likewise, to select the elements that could enter the Military School, to the Sergeants fit the degree of Army Second Lieutenant.

In 1950, under the leadership of Director General Jose Mauricio Lopez Escobar, the uniform was changed to dark green and the helmet was changed from khaki cork to a dark green or black American M-1 steel helmet with a liner made of laminated fiber; the shoes and leggings worn with the trousers were also black. In 1961, the Czech Mauser was replaced by the M1 carbine, as it did not possess a modern weapon. The carbine was replaced eight years in January 1969 by the German 7.62 mm G-3 rifle.

=== 100 Hour War ===
The "Football" War (La guerra del fútbol, in Spanish), also known as the 100-hours War, was a five-day war fought by El Salvador and Honduras in 1969. During this conflict, the National Guard, commanded by General José Alberto Medrano, participated in the Northern Theater of Operations (TON), and covered the flanks of the advance carried out by the 1st and 8th Infantry Battalions. The National Guard advanced successfully in Morral, El Portillo, Llano Largo, San Marcos Ocotepeque, La Labor, and Plan of Rancho Santa Lucia, and also was charged with defending the "Presa 5 November ".

In May 1971, the National Guard replaced its old khaki uniform with an olive-green uniform.

=== 1970s ===
On 8 February 1971, agents of the National Guard carried out the public execution of Victoriano Gómez Urrutia, who became the last person to be executed by El Salvador. A firing squad shot Gómez Urrutia in a football stadium in San Miguel, executing the sentence for the murders of a woman and her underage daughter committed by Gómez Urrutia in January 1961.

=== 1980s ===
The United Nations sponsored Truth Commission report, issued in 1993, alleges that the National Guard in the 1980s committed crimes against humanity, including massacres, torture, and extrajudicial assassinations. On December 28, 1983, the National Guard created the Batallón 15 de Septiembre (September 15 Battalion) with an initial total of 218 troops which was quickly increased to 500 and its mission was, guarding the premises of the Press "September 15", located in Canton San Lorenzo, on the edge of the Departments of San Vicente and Usulután on the Pan-American Highway. The Battalion was dissolved on December 31, 1990 by provisions of the High Command of the Armed Forces, likewise, was suspended the service provided to the National Guard facilities and Presidential House, it was replaced by the "Batallón Presidencial" (Presidential Battalion).

During the administration of President José Napoleón Duarte, on June 1, 1984, created the Ministry of Public Security, the Ministry of Defense and Public Security, according to Executive Order No. 1 of that same date, with the primary function of directing the actions of the National Guard, Treasury Police and National Police. Within this framework, the National Guard worked again with the original mission as assigned, which was as Rural Police.

The "Compañía de Operaciones Antiterroristas para Areas Rurales y Urbanas ("Company for Anti-terrorist operations for Urban and Rural Areas) (COPARU) was created in 1985, in order to carry out counter-terrorist operations in the field and in the city. COPARU was dissolved on January 2, 1992, its mission transferred to the National Guard who was responsible for the functions of Public Security.

=== 1990s ===
By signing the Peace Accords, on January 16, 1992, between the government and the FMLN, regarding the matter of Public Security, agreed to abolish the National Guard and Treasury Police, and his staff were integrated the army. This provision came into effect on March 2, and the new mission was to guard borders and homelands to serve as military police, under the name of a new military unit: the Special Brigade of Military Security of the Military of El Salvador, based on agreement N ° 59 of the Executive Branch, dated June 25, 1992. Also at that time the organic law dated from September 25, 1934 was repealed.

The National Guard closed its doors on June 30, 1992. Its last director was Col. Juan Carlos Carrillo Schlenker.

In the late 1990s, the U.S. based Center for Justice and Accountability (CJA) began legal proceedings on behalf of Salvadorans living in the U.S. who had won political asylum due to their mistreatment by the Salvadoran National Guard. The following summarizes the legal proceedings of those cases against two Salvadoran generals, one of them, Carlos Eugenio Vides Casanova, commander of the Salvadoran National Guard from 1979 to 1984:

The Legal Complaint:

CJA has pursued Salvadoran human rights litigation since its founding in 1998, when it generated a "most wanted list" of Salvadoran human rights violators named in the UN-sponsored Truth Commission and reported to be in the U.S.

In May 1999, CJA filed a civil lawsuit in the U.S. District Court for the Southern District of Florida against two of the most notorious perpetrators on that list: Jose Garcia, the minister of defense of El Salvador from 1979 to 1983, and Eugenio Carlos Vides-Casanova, the director general of El Salvador's National Guard during the same period. Both defendants "retired" to the United States in August 1989.

Sister Case: Ford v. Garcia

CJA worked closely with Human Rights First, which brought a similar case Ford v. Garcia against the same two generals on behalf of four U.S. churchwomen who were tortured and murdered by the Salvadoran National Guard in 1980. A jury heard that case in October 2000, and rendered a verdict that the generals could not be held liable for the crimes, presumably on the theory that they did not have "effective control" over their subordinates. The plaintiffs appealed and in April 2002 the 11th Circuit Court of Appeals decided a new trial was not warranted and affirmed the U.S. Federal Court's decision in Ford v. Garcia.

Trial & Verdict

On July 23, 2002, following a four-week trial, a federal jury in West Palm Beach returned a verdict of $54.6 million against the two Generals.

The verdict was a landmark victory for human rights litigation in the U.S. It was one of the first instances where a jury in a fully contested trial found perpetrators liable for human rights abuses solely under the doctrine of command responsibility.

The Appeal

The defendants appealed the verdict and, in February 2005, the 11th Circuit Court of Appeals overturned CJA's victory in the case. The Court ruled that the plaintiffs failed to state a cause of action within the 10-year statute of limitations of Torture Victim Protection Act (TVPA).

Then, in June 2005, the 11th Circuit acknowledged certain factual errors in its prior ruling: the court had failed to consider that Vides Casanova had left power in El Salvador in May 1989, and that therefore CJA's May 1999 filing was just under the 10 year mark.

On January 5, 2006, the 11th Circuit issued a new ruling upholding the verdict in its entirety: the jury's verdict against both generals remained valid. The court's opinion reached two important conclusions on the question of equitable tolling in ATS cases. Equitable tolling is a legal doctrine that allows for the extending of statutes of limitations, when a deliberate act of the defendant, or an extraordinary circumstance prevented the plaintiff from timely filing suit. On this issue, the court held:

"Congress clearly intends that courts toll the statute of limitations so long as the defendants remain outside the reach of the United States courts or the courts of other, similarly fair legal systems."

In this case, the court held that "exceptional circumstances" allowed for the tolling of the statute of limitations until the end of the civil war in El Salvador in 1992.

"The quest for … legitimacy and power may provide regimes with the incentive to intimidate witnesses, to suppress evidence and to commit additional human rights abuses against those who speak out against the regime. Such circumstances exemplify "extraordinary circumstances" and may require equitable tolling so long as the perpetrating regime remains in power."

Asset Collection In July 2006, Vides Casanova was forced to relinquish over $300,000 of his own funds. This collection represents one of the first human rights cases in U.S. history in which victims have recovered money from those found responsible for abuses. Our heroic clients have donated almost all of the proceeds to charity.

On April 18, 2011, the Department of Homeland Security (DHS) began court proceedings in a south Florida court-room to remove from the United States Carlos Eugenio Vides-Casanova on charges of assisting or otherwise participating in torture. See Immigration and Nationality Act § 237(a)(4)(D), 8 U.S.C. § 1227(a)(4)(D) (2006), referring to INA § 212(a)(3)(E)(iii)(I), 8 U.S.C. § 1182(a)(3)(E)(iii)(I). This trial marks the first time the DHS has used the INA removal provisions on torture against a senior level commander.

== Organization ==
In 1988 the National Guard had 4,200 members, which expanded to 7,700 a year later and was organized into fourteen companies (often of battalion size), one per Department of El Salvador, a Military Police company, the Technical Assistance Department (a SWAT unit with American military advisors) and the Transport Group .

A tactical structure of five commands or battalions could replace the regular organization in an emergency.

== Uniforms and equipment ==
The National Guard's service uniform was a dark green button down blouse and trousers and a black American M1 steel helmet liner made of laminated fiber; black shoes or boots, leather leggings, worn with the trousers were also black.

The National Guard's basic garrison uniform consisted of American OG-107 olive-green fatigue shirt, trousers, and cap worn with a black belt, socks, and shoes. The standard uniform became the combat uniform with the addition of combat boots, a helmet, and field equipment. U.S. jungle uniforms or camouflage BDUs were worn in the field.

The rank structure of the National Guard followed the pattern of the United States military, with minor variations.

The standard National Guard weapon was the German 7.62 mm G-3 rifle with the American M16 rifle also being used.

== See also ==
- Civil Guard
- National Guard (disambiguation)
- Salvadoran Civil War
- Weapons of the Salvadoran Civil War
