= Salvadoran Army =

Land branch of the Armed Forces of El Salvador

- Ejército Salvadoreño
- Badge of the Salvadoran Army.
- Founded: 1824
- Country: El Salvador
- Branch: Army
- Size: 20,500
- Part of: Armed Forces of El Salvador

Commanders
- Commander-in-Chief: President Nayib Bukele
- Minister of National Defense: Vice Admiral René Merino Monroy
- Chief of the Army Staff: Colonel Mario Adalberto Figueroa Cárcamo

Insignia
- Flag

The Salvadoran Army (Spanish: Ejército Salvadoreño) is the land branch and largest of the Armed Forces of El Salvador.

== History ==
=== The Football War ===
The Football War (also called The Soccer War or 100-hours War) was a term coined by Polish reporter Ryszard Kapuściński to describe a brief conflict between El Salvador and neighbouring Honduras. He argued that the war began after the rival nations traded wins during the qualifying round for the 1970 FIFA World Cup. But this event was not the cause of the war. Tensions had been mounting between both nations for several years because of immigration and economic problems, resulting on the war in 1969. The soccer matches incidents just one of several events that happened during that time. Longstanding tensions between the countries were heightened by media reports on both sides, each accusing the other of hooliganism and violence toward their own football fans. On June 26, 1969, El Salvador dissolved all ties with Honduras, the events were used as a call for nationalist pride for both governments and the media.

On July 14 Salvadoran forces began moving rapidly into Honduras following a series of border clashes. Their progress halted after the Organization of American States (OAS) and the United States brought heavy diplomatic pressure to bear on both governments in an effort to effect a cease-fire.

A ceasefire was ultimately negotiated and signed by July 18, with Salvadoran forces withdrawing from Honduras by August 2 following guarantees of safety for Salvadoran citizens in Honduras by the Honduran government.

=== The Salvadoran Civil War ===
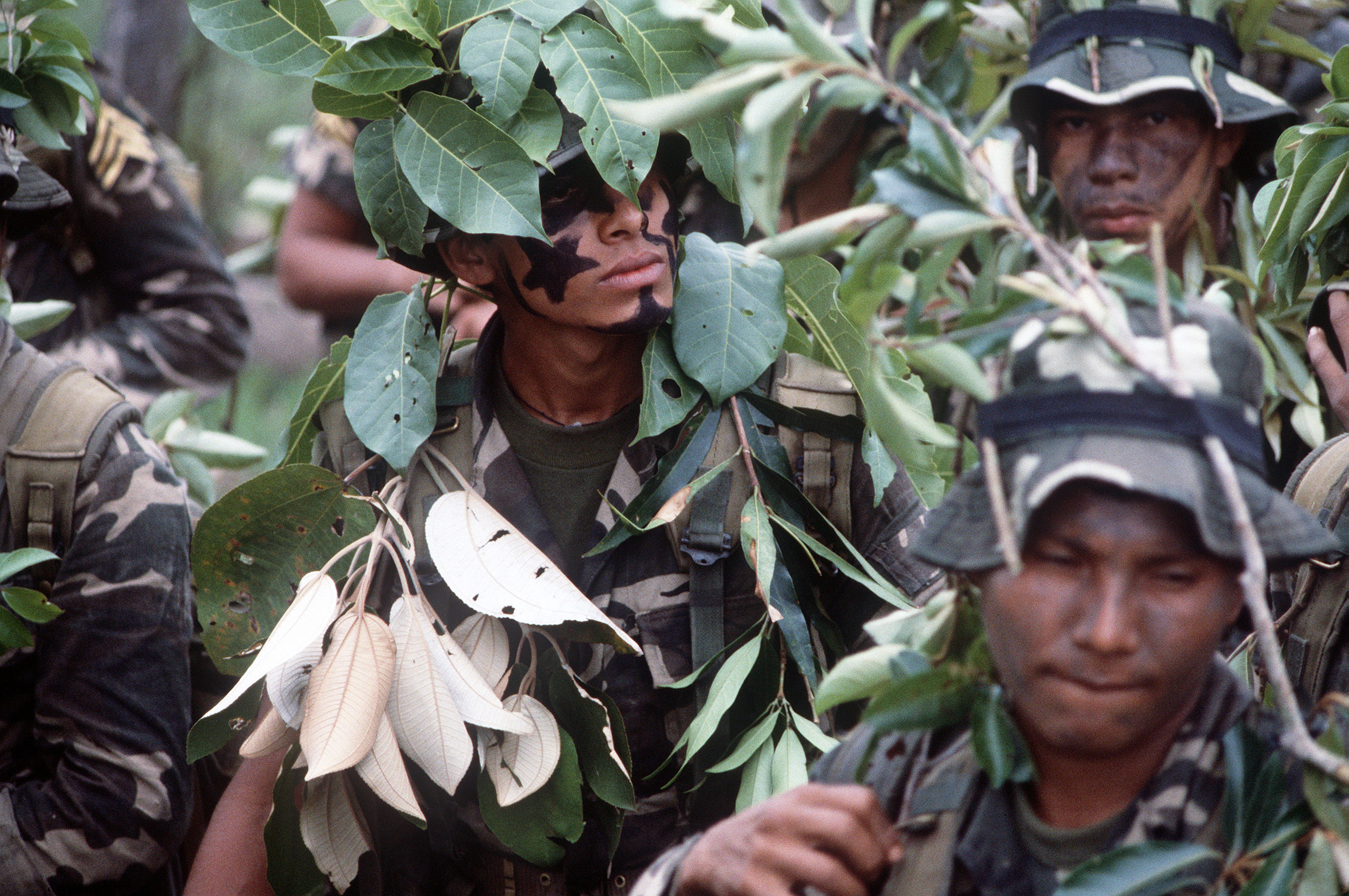
Soldiers of the Salvadoran Army during a training exercise in 1984.

By the late 1970s, longstanding socio-economic inequality, human rights violations and the unwillingness of the National Conciliation Party dictatorship to address these problems led to the growth of a social movement. The government responded by assassinating thousands of political opponents and massacring students and protestors on several occasions. The heavy handed response of the government signaled to those identifying with the social movement that peaceful solutions were futile, which led to the growth of an insurgency.

On October 15, 1979, the military government was deposed by a joint military-civilian government calling itself the Revolutionary Government Junta of El Salvador (JRG). The JRG's policies were met with opposition from the military and economic elites and government repression increased, with tens of thousands of civilians being killed in 1980 and 1981 alone. This led to the formation of the Farabundo Martí National Liberation Front (FMLN), which brought on a twelve-year civil war. On March 24, 1980 Major Roberto D'Aubuisson ordered the killing of Archbishop Óscar Romero; on December 8, 1980 five members of the Salvadoran Army kidnapped and killed missionaries Maryknoll Sisters Maura Clarke and Ita Ford, Ursuline Dorothy Kazel, and lay missionary Jean Donovan under the orders of Carlos Eugenio Vides Casanova and his cousin Col. Óscar Edgardo Casanova Vejar, the local military commander in Zacatecoluca,

As of 1981, according to a report by U.S. general Frederick Woerner, the Salvadoran Army was organized to fight a conventional conflict like the Football War, and was described as "a militia of 11,000" that spent most of its time "sitting in garrisons abusing civilians." Salvadoran troops mostly performed static defense at checkpoints and critical infrastructure. Reforming the army was deemed too expensive by the Ronald Reagan administration, which chose the option of providing just enough assistance to prevent an FMLN victory. Green Berets from the U.S. 7th Special Forces Group provided assistance to the Salvadoran Army. The initial phase from 1981 to 1984 focused on the use of over forty Green Beret mobile teams to train, advise, and expand the force from 11,000 to 42,000 men — inside the country, in neighboring countries, and in the United States. The next phase, until 1991, saw several advisors attached to every Salvadoran brigade to focus on increasing their effectiveness. Mobile teams continued to work with Salvadoran forces as needed during the second phase, but on a greatly reduced scale.

Because reorganizing the entire Salvadoran Army was too difficult, U.S. advisors focused on creating new units that had been use effectively against insurgencies in other Latin American countries. Highly mobile cazador (hunter) battalions of 250 to 350 conscripts were formed and trained by U.S. and Venezuelan advisors. However, the new battalions proved too weak to take on well-organized and experienced FMLN units. They were replaced by Batallones de Infantería de Reacción Inmediata (quick reaction infantry battalions, BIRIs). The BIRIs received six months of training from Green Berets instead of six weeks and functioned like Ranger units. They were under the direct command of the Salvadoran General Staff, but were often based at the same facilities as the six regular army brigades, and were used as a rapid reaction force.

The army had two-year conscription in effect during the war, and sometimes entire units were created from the draft, including the BIRIs. When they completed their terms, the entire unit was dissolved, and only some officers and a few NCOs chose to stay in the army. The terms of the Chapultepec Peace Accords, in effect from January 1992, caused the Salvadoran Army to be reduced by half, and every BIRI was disbanded.

=== The Iraq War ===
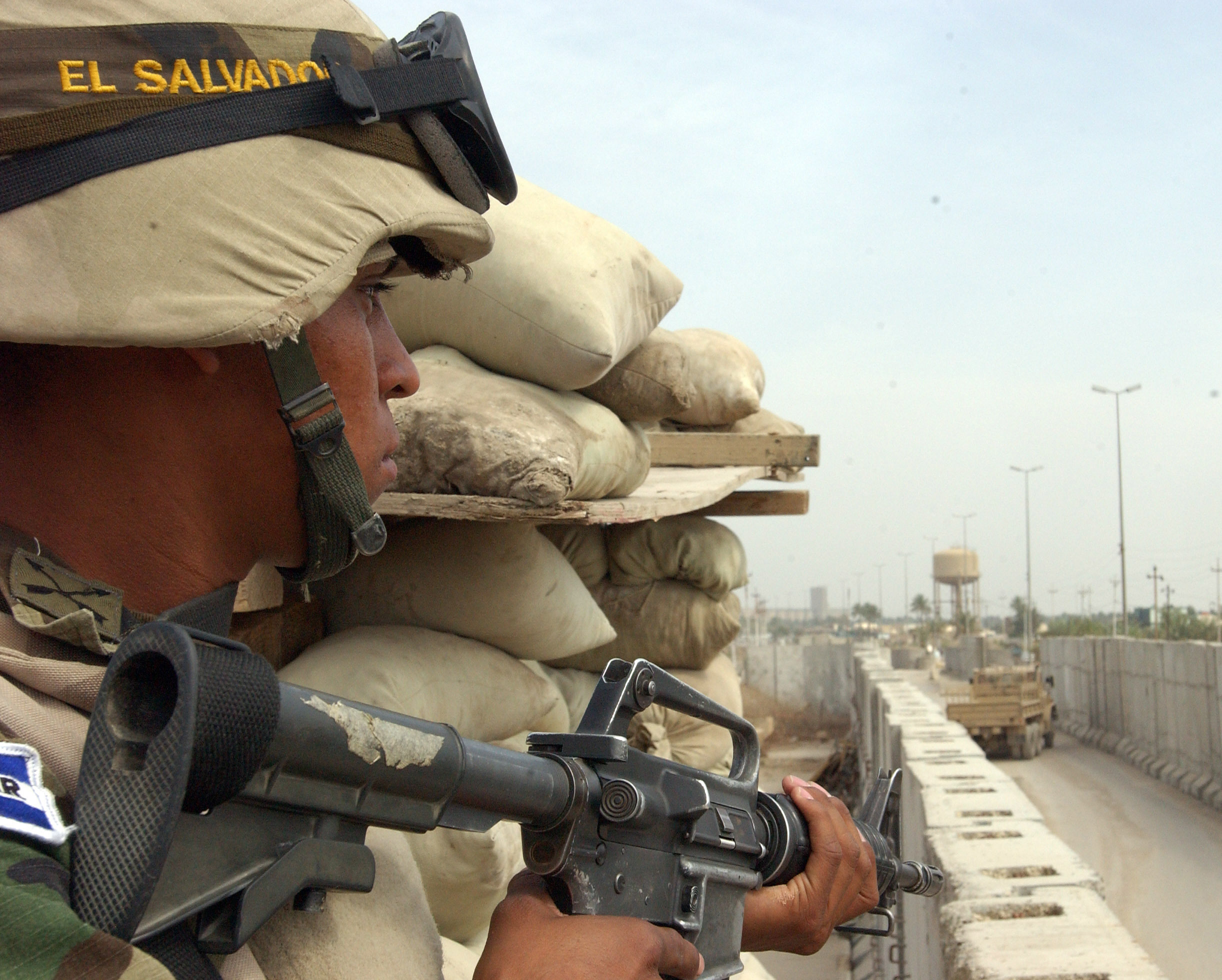
An unidentified Salvadoran special forces Soldier keeps a close eye on the borders of Camp Charlie in Al Hillah, Iraq, April 14, 2005. The Cuscatlán Battalion IV Soldier is helping support Operation Iraqi Freedom, which is being conducted mainly by Coalition Forces in Hillah.

Up to 380 Salvadoran troops of the Cuscatlán Battalion were deployed as part of the Coalition Forces in Iraq between August 2003 and January 2009. They operated alongside the elite Spanish Legion in Najaf. While in Iraq, the Salvadoran contingent suffered 5 dead, and more than 50 wounded.

In 2006 the government of El Salvador approached the Israeli ambassador to El Salvador seeking assistance in modernising its army.

== Organizational structure ==
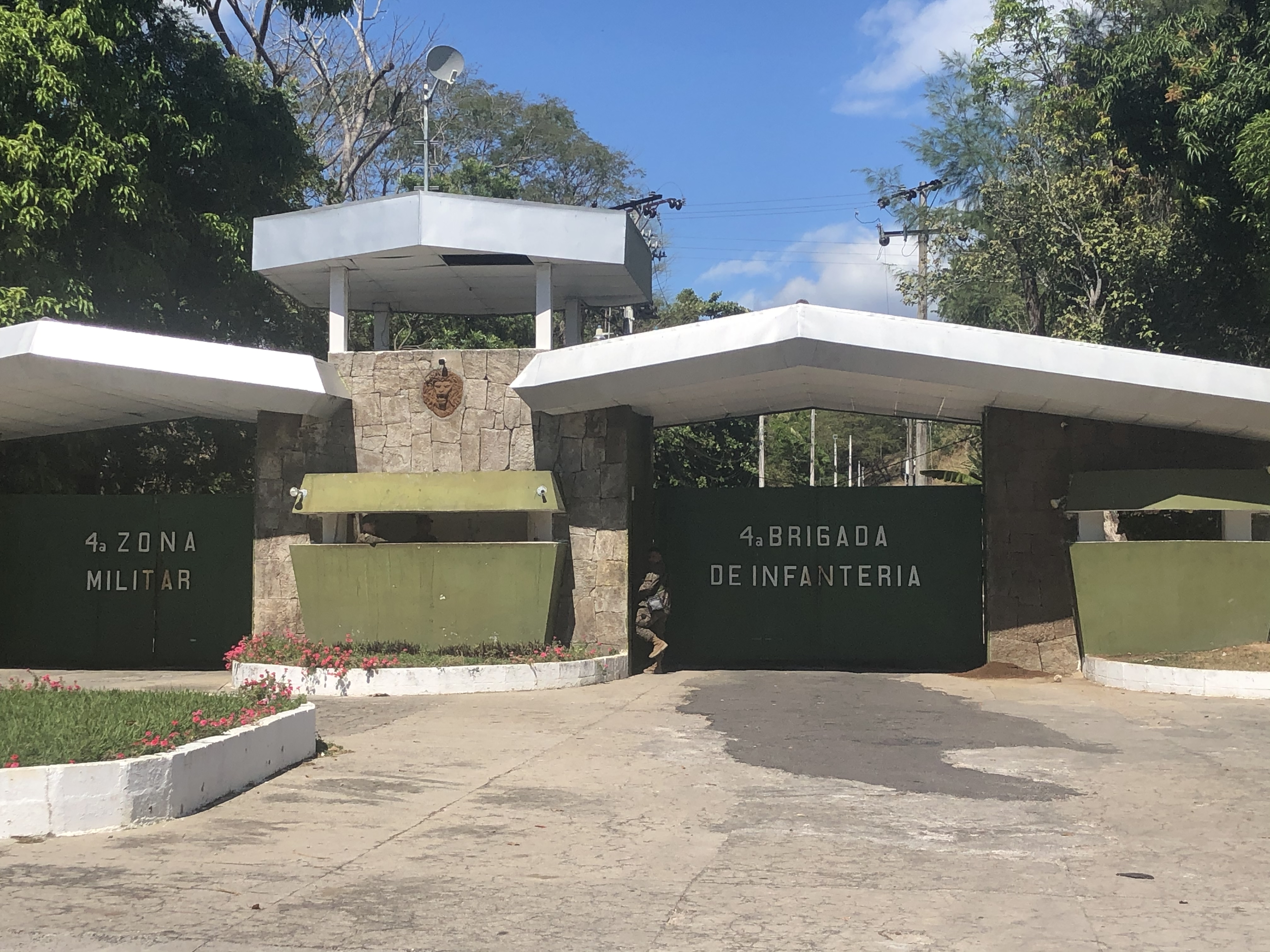
Barracks of the 4th Brigade.

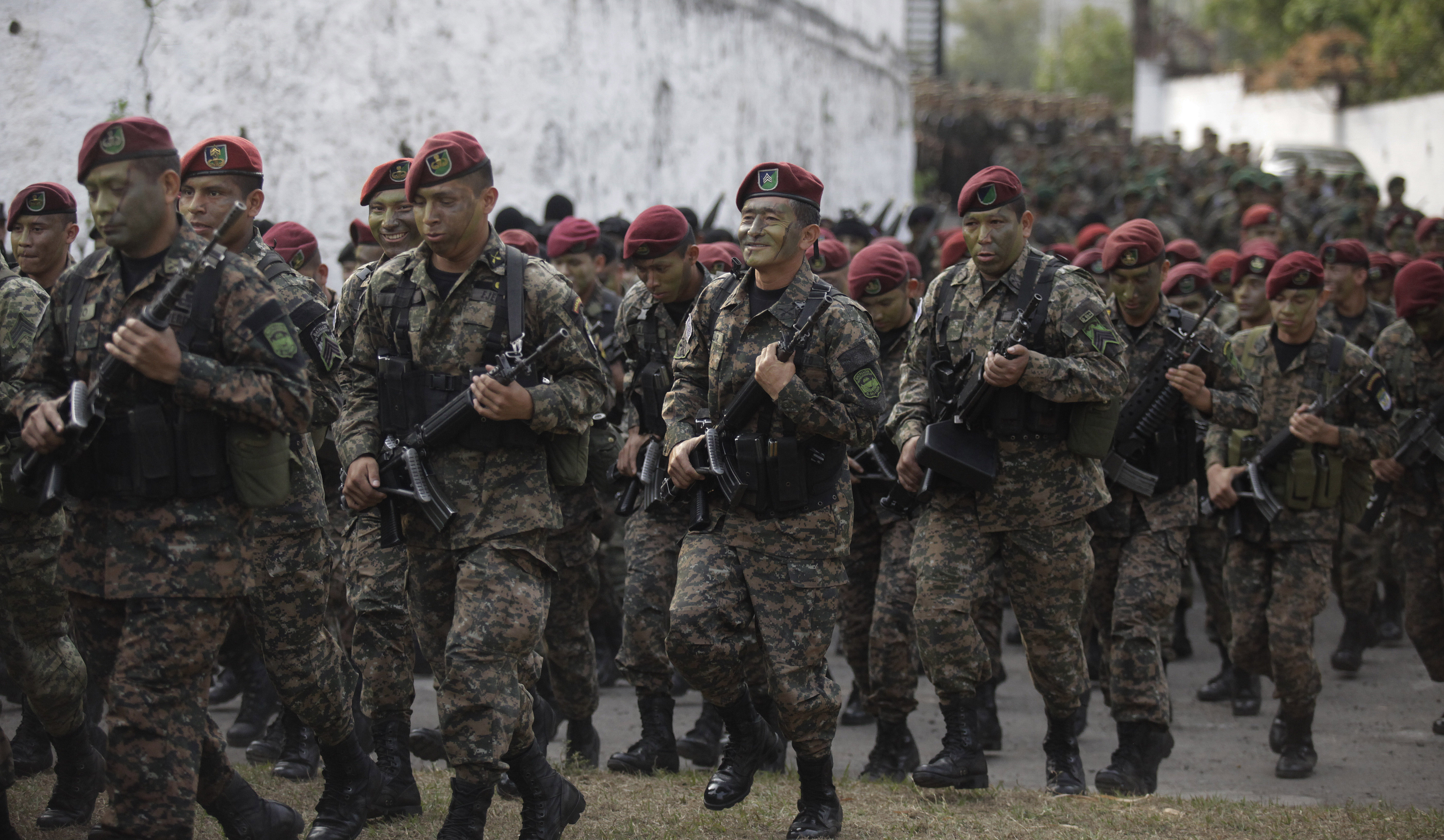
Salvadoran Special Forces

Each of the Zone has its own Infantry Brigade, however the Third Military Zone, being the largest and the most important, has two Infantry Brigades: the 3rd Infantry Brigade and the 6th Infantry Brigade.

- 1st brigade (San Salvador)
- 2nd brigade (Santa Ana)
- 3rd brigade (San Miguel)
- 4th brigade (Chalatenango)
- 5th brigade (San Vicente)
- 6th brigade (Usulután)

Furthermore, the army has the following units:

- 1 Special Military Security Brigade consisting of 2 Military Police, 1 Foot Guards and 2 border security battalions,
- 8 Military Detachments (1 to 7, and 9) with 2 infantry battalions each,
  - Destacamento Militar N.º 1 (Chalatenango)
  - DM N. 2 (Sensuntepeque)
  - DM N.º 3 (La Unión)
  - DM N.º 4 (Morazán) Headquarters of the Comandos de Montaña,
  - DM N.º 5 (Cojutepeque)
  - DM N.º 6 (Sonsonate)
  - DM N.º 7 (Ahuachapán)
  - DM N.º 9 (Zacatecoluca)
- 1 Engineer Command with of 2 battalions,
- 1 artillery brigade with of 2 field artillery and 2 anti-aircraft battalions,
- 1 mechanized cavalry regiment with 2 battalions,
- Special Forces Command with 1 Parachute Infantry Battalion, 1 Special Operations Group, and 1 Anti-Terrorism Command.
- 1 female soldiers battalion administratively part of the artillery brigade

== Equipment ==
=== Infantry weapons ===
Name	Type	Image	Origin	Notes
Handguns
P227	Semi-automatic pistol		United States	All its variants. Used by soldiers and special forces.
P226	Semi-automatic pistol		Germany	All its variants including the SIG Sauer X Six SIG P226 X Six. Used by soldiers and special forces.
M9	Semi-automatic pistol		United States	
CZ 75	Semi-automatic pistol, machine pistol		Czech Republic	
92SB	Semi-automatic pistol		Italy	
92FS	Semi-automatic pistol		Italy	
FN P35	Semi-automatic pistol		Belgium	
IWI 941	Semi-automatic pistol		Israel	
G17	Semi-automatic pistol		Austria	Salvadoran Army's Special Forces and Anti-terrorist Command. Variants that are used: Glock 17, Glock 17C, Glock 17L, Glock 17MB, Glock 17M.
Sub-machine guns
Uzi	Sub-machine gun		Israel	Uzi submachine gun, Mini-Uzi.
Ingram MAC-10	Sub-machine gun		United States	
MP5	Sub-machine gun		Germany	MP5SD3, MP5A3, MP5A2, MP5, MP5A1
Carbines
CAR-15	Carbine		United States	Colt Model 933, XM177, GAU-5/A (Colt Model 610), XM177E1 (Colt Model 609), XM177E2 (Colt Model 629), Colt Model 653 (M16A1 Carbine), Colt Model 654 (M16A1 Carbine), Colt Model 654 (M16A1 Carbine), Colt Model 727 (M16A2 carbine), Colt Model 733 Colt Commando Carbine (M16A2 Commando Carbine Model 733 (single fire/full auto)), Colt Model 735 Colt Commando Carbine (M16A2 Commando Carbine Model 735 (single fire/three round burst)), Colt Model 723 "M16A2 Carbine"(M16A2 carbine Model 723). M16A2 SMG Model 635, XM177-E2 (Colt Model 629), Model 933, Colt Model 629, Colt 9mm SMG DOE (Model 633, US Car 15 Carbine (Colt Model 607), US XM177E1 (Colt Model 619), US XM177E2 GAU-5/A/B (Colt Model 639)).
M4	Carbine		United States	M4 Carbine, Colt M4A1, Colt M4 (original 1993 version), M4 (Colt Model 933), Colt M4 and Colt M4A1 (M16A2 sights, burst and full auto respectively)
HK416	Carbine		Germany	
Galil ACE	Carbine		Colombia; Israel	ACE 21, ACE 22, ACE 23 (5.56×45mm NATO), ACE 32 (7.62×39mm), ACE 52, ACE 53 (7.62×51mm NATO).
Assault rifles
M16	Assault rifle		United States	XM16E1, M16A1, M16A2, M16A3, M16A4, M16A1 with A2 handguards. M16A2 (Model 701, 703, 705 (Burst fire/single fire)), Model 711, Model 715 and Model 720 (Burst fire/single fire)). M16A2 Light Machine Gun (LMG). Some M16A1's have M16A2's brass defectors, XM16E1. M16A2 (Model 645), some M16A1's (also with the A2 handguards) have the M16A2 hand-grip. M16A1 with A2 handgrip A2 brass defectors. Also M16A1 with M16A2 handguards have M16A2 brass defectors and M16A1 handgrip, M16A1 (enhanced), M16A2 Model 719.
HK33	Assault rifle		Germany	Including HK53 variant
FN FNC	Assault rifle		Belgium	versions used: Standard" Model 2000 and Short" Model 7000, used by the Salvadoran Military Police and Paratrooper Battalion
T65	Assault rifle		Republic of China	
IMI Galil	Assault rifle		Israel	Galil AR, Galil SAR, Galil SAR339, Micro Galil, Galil ARM.
IWI ARAD	Assault rifle		Israel	Arad 5.
AK-63	Assault rifle		Hungary	Used since 1992.
Steyr AUG	Assault rifle	framless	Austria	Used since the 1990s by the Salvadoran Army Special Forces.
Colt Canada C7 rifle	Assault rifle		Canada	Colt Model 715. Imported from Canada in the 2000s.
MPi-KM	Assault rifle		East Germany	Used since 1992 by the special forces.
AK-47	Assault rifle		Russia	Used since 1992 by the special forces.
AKM	Assault rifle		Russia	Used since 1992 by the special forces.
Pistol Mitralieră model 1963/1965	Assault rifle		Romania	Recovered from gang members.
Battle and Designated marksman rifles
M14	Battle rifle		United States	Used as ceremonial gun, still used in active service on the Salvadoran Army infantry divisions,
Heckler & Koch G3	Battle rifle		Germany	G3A3, G3A4, G3KA4
Sniper rifles
M24	Sniper rifle		United States	
M21	Sniper rifle		United States	Used by the Salvadoran Army Special Forces.
Dragunov SVD	Sniper rifle		Russia	Used by the Salvadoran Army Special Forces.
Mk 22	Sniper rifle		United States	Used by the Salvadoran Army Special Forces.
Barrett M82	Anti-materiel precision rifle		United States	Used by the Salvadoran Army Special Forces.
Light machine guns
Diemaco C7A1 LSW	Light machine gun		Canada	Colt Model 715. Imported from Canada in the 2000s.
M249	light machine gun		United States	First-generation M249 SAW, M249 Paratrooper.
FN Minimi	light machine gun		Belgium	Minimi Para, FN Minimi.
General purpose machine guns
M60	General purpose machine gun		United States	M60, M60E2, M60B, M60C M60D. During the civil war some M60s were chopped from the front sights to give CBQ capabilities.
HK21	General purpose machine gun		Germany	
FN MAG	General purpose machine gun		Belgium	
M2HB	Heavy machine gun		United States	
Grenade launchers
M79	Grenade launcher		United States	
M203	Grenade launcher		United States	mounted on M16 rifles (all variants), M4s, M4A1s and CAR-15s (all variants).
Grenades
M18	Smoke grenade		United States	
M67	Grenade		United States	
Anti-tank weapons
RPG-7	Rocket-propelled grenade		Russia	
M72A2 LAW	Rocket-propelled grenade		United States	
C90-CR (M3)	Rocket-propelled grenade		Spain	
MANPADS
FIM-43 Redeye	Man portable surface-to-air missile launcher		United States	
SA-7 Grail (Strela 2)	Man portable surface-to-air missile launcher		Russia	

The Salvadoran Army/Navy/Marines/Air Force use the same kind of small arms types. It also uses telescopic sights, Aimpoint T2 Micro, Ohuhu OH-RG-SC Reflex Sights (panoramic sights), EOTech EXPS 3-0 sights, Barska Holographic Reflex Red Dot Sight, Ozark Rihno Tactical Sights, Trijicon MRO-C sights, EOTech 512..A65 sights, Vortex Optics StrikeFire II sights, Burrist Fast BFire3, Tasco Red Dot Sights, CVLIFE Optics Hunting Rifle Scope 2.5x40e red and green illuminated crosshair mount sights in every kind of assault rifle and rifle that all military branches of the Salvadoran armed forces use.

== Vehicles ==
=== Armored combat vehicles ===
Model	Image	Type	Number	Origin	Notes
Combat vehicles
VCTA2		Tank hunter	38	El Salvador	created by the Salvadoran Military Forces
Armored patrol and scout cars
HMMWV		Light armoured car	50	United States	
Armored personnel carriers
M113		APC	20	United States	

=== Logistic vehicles ===
Model	Image	Type	Number	Origin	Notes
Trucks
F-Series		Truck	3+	Japan	Part of a fleet of 45 new vehicles.
M35 truck		Medium cargo truck	45	United States	
M809 truck		Heavy cargo truck		United States	
MAN 630 truck		Heavy cargo truck		Germany	
Utility Trucks
D22		Pick up	22+	Japan	Part of a fleet of 45 new vehicles.
2011 Ford Ranger		Light utility vehicle	37	United States	
CJ-8 Scrambler		utility truck	Unknown	United States	
Dodge M37		Light utility vehicle		United States	Mostly converted to Cashuats.
Utility Vehicle
AIL Storm		Light utility vehicle	38	Israel	
Jeep J8		Light utility vehicle		United States	
Jeep CJ		Light utility vehicle		United States	
M151		Light utility vehicle		United States	

=== Artillery ===
Model	Image	Caliber	Number	Dates	Origin	Notes
Mortars
M19		60mm	306		United States	
Howitzers
M101		105mm	8		United States	
M114		155mm	6		United States	

=== Air-defence equipment ===
Model	Image	Caliber	Number	Dates	Origin	Notes
Anti-aircraft autocannon vehicle
BC7A1		20mm	4		El Salvador	Armoured personnel carrier armed with two HS 404 20mm cannons. Also used as Anti-Air vehicle, created by the Salvadoran army.

== Bibliography ==
- "El Salvador". Military Technology World Defence Almanac. Bonn : Wehr & Wissen: 60. 2005. ISSN 0722-3226.
- Sobchak, Frank K. (2024). Training for Victory: U.S. Special Forces Advisory Operations from El Salvador to Afghanistan. Annapolis, Maryland: Naval Institute Press. ISBN 978-1-68247-133-3.
