= Caudillo =

Type of personalist leader wielding political power

A 1963 Spanish peseta coin with the image of Generalissimo Francisco Franco, and inscription Caudillo de España, por la Gracia de Dios (Spanish for "Caudillo of Spain, by the Grace of God")

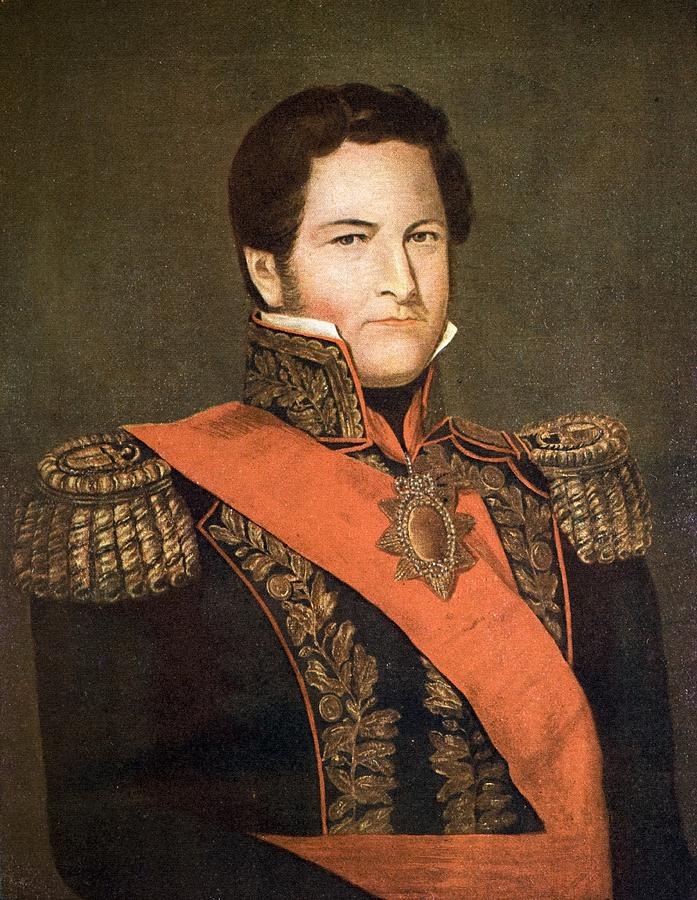
Juan Manuel de Rosas, c. 1841 by Cayetano Descalzi, the caudillo paradigm

A caudillo (/kɔːˈdiː(l)joʊ, kaʊˈ-/ kaw-DEE(L)-yoh, kow-, Spanish: [kawˈðiʎo]; Old Spanish: cabdillo, from Latin capitellum, diminutive of caput "head") is a type of personalist leader wielding military and political power. The term is historically associated with Spain and post-independence Hispanic America. It is often used interchangeably with "military dictator", "warlord", "strongman", and "Generalissimo", but specifically to Spain and Hispanic America.

The roots of caudillismo may be tied to the framework of rule in medieval and early modern Spain during the Reconquista from the Moors. Spanish conquistadors such as Hernán Cortés and Francisco Pizarro exhibit characteristics of the caudillo, being successful military leaders, having mutual reliance on the leader and their supporters, and rewarding them for their loyalty. An important characteristic of caudillos is their charisma, which drew in followers who could be used to change the political climate and shape state formation in the postcolonial era. The followers of caudillos, called gauchos, were common people whom the caudillos could charm and persuade into joining their cause. Often, the caudillo would take on the role of the provider as a substitute for the shortcomings of those in the government. It created a type of father-child bond between the caudillo and gaucho that strengthened loyalties and made the caudillos powerful.

During the colonial era, the Spanish crown asserted its power and established a plethora of bureaucratic institutions that prevented personalist rule. Historian John Lynch argues that the rise of caudillos in Spanish America is rooted not in the distant Spanish past, but in the immediate context of the Spanish American wars of independence. The wars overthrew colonial rule and left a power vacuum in the early 19th century. Caudillos were very influential in the history of Spanish America and left a legacy that has influenced political movements in the modern era.

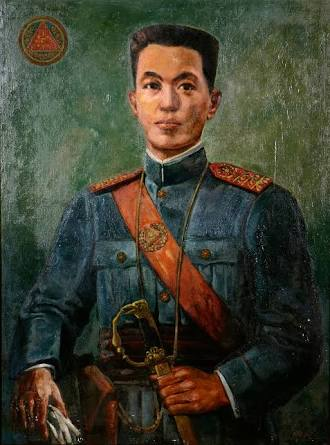
Emilio Aguinaldo, a Filipino revolutionary who was the first president of the Philippines, and was nicknamed "El Caudillo".

However, the term is also used for the authoritarian regimes of Francisco Franco in Spain and Antonio Salazar in Portugal. The term is often used pejoratively by critics of a regime. Spain's General Francisco Franco (1936–1975), though, proudly took the title as his own during and after his military overthrow of the Second Spanish Republic in the Spanish Civil War (1936–1939). Spanish censors during his rule attacked publishers who applied the term to Hispanic-American strongmen. Scholars have applied the term to a variety of Hispanic-American leaders.

== Spanish American caudillos ==
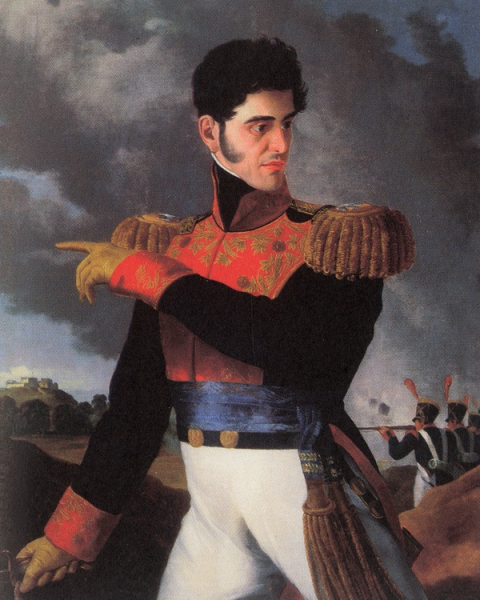
Antonio López de Santa Anna, who dominated Mexican politics in the first half of the 19th century

Since Spanish American independence in the early nineteenth century, the region has been noted for its number of caudillos and the duration of their rule. The early nineteenth century is sometimes called "The Age of Caudillos", with Juan Manuel de Rosas, dictator of Argentina, and his contemporary in Mexico, Antonio López de Santa Anna, dominating national politics. Weak nation-states in Spanish America fostered the continuation of caudillismo from the late nineteenth century into the twentieth century. The lack of government attention to the needs of the people allowed for there to be space for caudillos to fill those roles to give aid to peasants.

The formation of Mexico's Institutional Revolutionary Party in 1929 effectively ended caudillismo. Men characterized as caudillos have ruled in Cuba (Gerardo Machado, Fulgencio Batista, Fidel Castro), Panama (Omar Torrijos, Manuel Noriega), the Dominican Republic (Desiderio Arias, Cipriano Bencosme), Paraguay (Alfredo Stroessner), Argentina (Juan Perón and other military strongmen), and Chile (Augusto Pinochet). Caudillos have been the subject of literature in Spanish America.

Hispanic America is not unique in having strong leaders emerge during times of turmoil. The cause of their emergence in Spanish America is generally seen to be in the destruction of the Spanish colonial state structure after the wars of independence, and in the importance of leaders from the independence struggles for providing government in the postindependence period, when nation-states came into being. Historian John Lynch states, "Before 1810, the caudillo was unknown … The caudillo entered history as a local hero whom larger events promoted to a military chieftain."

In a rural areas that lacked any institutions of the state, and where the environment was one of violence and anarchy, caudillos could impose order, often by using violence to achieve it. Their local control as strongmen needed to be maintained by assuring the loyalty of their followers, so bestowing of material rewards reinforced their own positions. Caudillos could also maintain their position by protecting the interests of regional elites. Local strongman who built a regional base could aspire to become a national caudillo, taking control of the state.

Caudillos could bestow patronage on a large retinue of clients, who in turn gave them their loyalty. In general, caudillos' power benefited elites, but these strongmen were also mediators between elites and the popular classes, recruiting them into the power base, but also restraining them from achieving power themselves. For example, Federalist caudillos in the Argentinian provinces were able to build relationships with the rural poor, namely the gauchos and monteneros. As the war of the Triple Alliance spread, ideological language shifts occurred in Buenos Aires by the ruling Unitarians, who began referring to rural caudillos as barbarians and enemies of civilization. Unitarians tried to criminalize the federalists, illegitimizing their political position.

Caudillos were not leading partisan bands, according to the Unitarians, but rather warlords leading bandits. The resulting placement of national guard troops being stationed in the provinces, who would be given law enforcement tasks and specifically separation from the caudillos. As a next step political strategy, the Unitarians would also construct schools, providing compulsory education, emphasizing pro-unitarian political thought. Caudillos were effectively estranged by the effort and soon became a historical footnote in the process.

A few strongmen either rose from a humble background to protect the interests of indigenous groups or other rural marginalized groups or strongly identified with those groups. Historian E. Bradford Burns referred to them as "folk caudillos". In his analysis, they contrasted with Europeanized elites who viewed the lower orders with contempt. He gives examples of Juan Facundo Quiroga, Martín Güemes, and other Argentine caudillos, most importantly Juan Manuel de Rosas, who were popular and populist caudillos. Burns attributes the urban elites' bafflement and their contempt for followers of these folk caudillos for much of the negative role assigned to caudillos.

National caudillos often sought to legitimize their rule by holding titles of authority such as "President of the Republic". If the constitution put formal limits on presidential power and term limits, caudillos could bend or break the rules to maintain power, a practice dubbed continuismo.

Caudillo politics were not monolithic, tending to follow the politics that would serve them best by keeping them in power and allowing them to retain their following. Ideologically, caudillos could be either liberal or conservative. Liberalism had an advantage in the postindependence period, drawing on the ideas of the liberators and creating the institutional frameworks of the new nation-states via written constitutions. Free trade as an economic policy created market-oriented economies. The model that these nation-states often adopted was federalism, keeping power in the component regions. Federalism, however, tended toward centrifugalism and fragmentation and was characterized by weak central governments. Conservative caudillos also emerged around 1830. New nation-states often rejected the institutions of the colonial era as legacies to be rejected, but the Roman Catholic Church and traditional values remained strong in many regions, supported by elites seeking to maintain their power in the new order. Conservative caudillos, supported by the Church and elites, moved to the creation of strong, central governments.

== Independence era ==
Although the hope existed of some Spanish American leaders of independence that the political contours of regions would reconstitute the former viceroyalties, but with local autonomy. The Roman Catholic Church as an institution remained strong and the militaries won victories against royalist forces. The state as an institution in most areas was weak. Conflicts over the form the new governments should take were rampant, and veterans of the wars of independence saw themselves as the leaders of the nation-states they had helped bring into being.

These caudillos were able to maintain their power through their connection with their gauchos. Unlike their traditional elite counterparts, caudillos sought to keep the relationships with their supporters strong. They often lived near or amongst the "common people", so they were able to develop personal connections and experience problems first hand that otherwise might have been ignored by the elites. Gauchos would influence the political opinion of the common people, or peasants, through oral culture. They would tell stories and write songs and poems that shed their caudillos and their ideals in a positive light. Their influence on the political climate allowed the common people to be a driving force of nation-building rather than just elite leaders.

In the wake of the violence and political disruption, new nations were faced with widespread property destruction, the disappearance of trade, and states that lacked political authority. The first few decades after independence saw the rise of strongmen with roots in the military. Spanish America had known no other type of regime than monarchy, and Mexico established one under a royalist general-turned-insurgent Agustín de Iturbide. In Spanish America, new sovereign states grappled with the question of balancing a central authority, usually in the hands of the traditional elites, with some kind of representation of the new "citizenry" of the republics. Constitutions were written laying out the division of powers, but the rule of personalist strongmen, caudillos, dominated. Dictatorial powers were granted to some caudillos, nominally ruling as presidents under a constitution, as "constitutional dictators".

=== Major leaders of the independence era ===
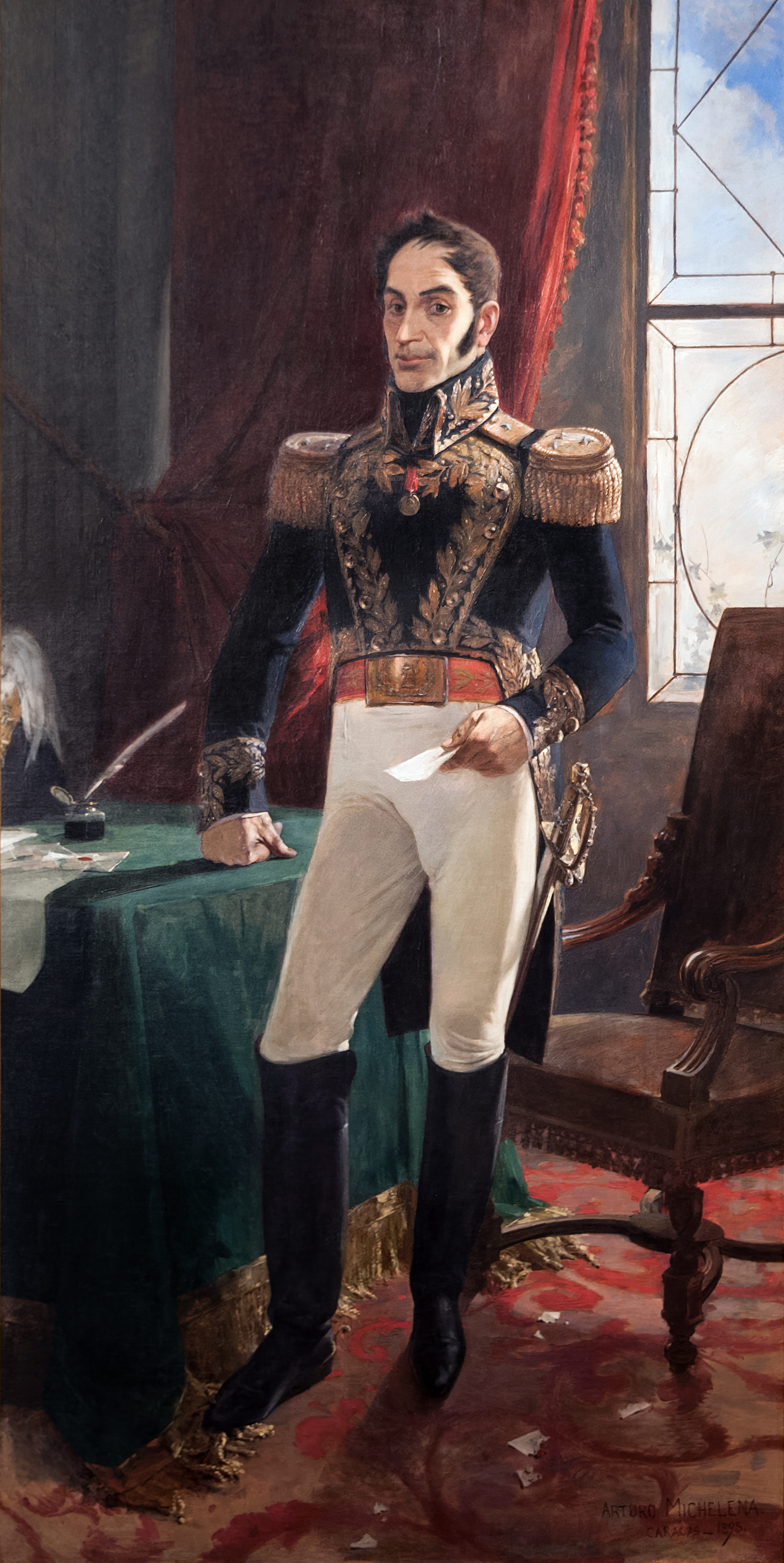
Simón Bolívar

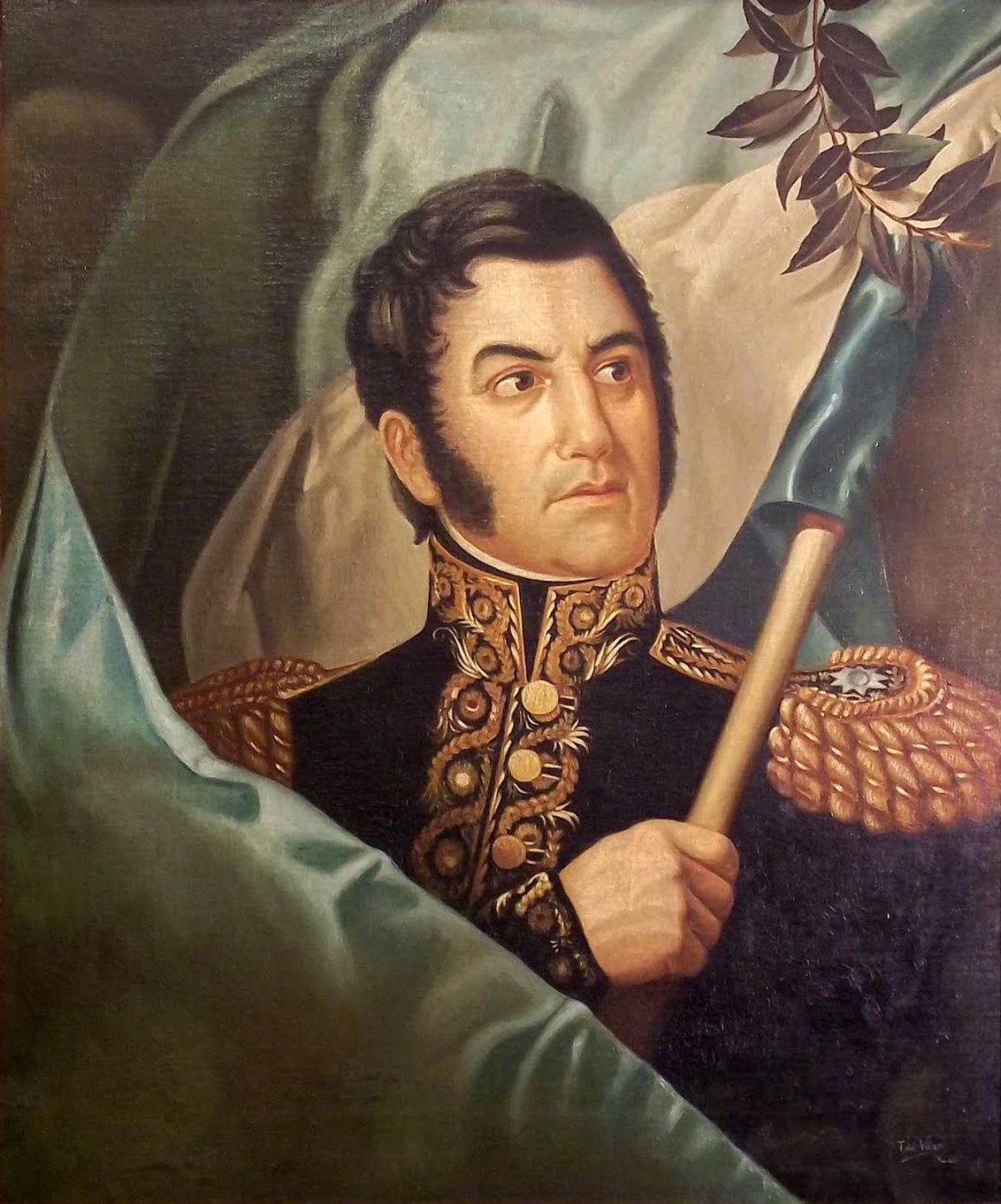
José de San Martín

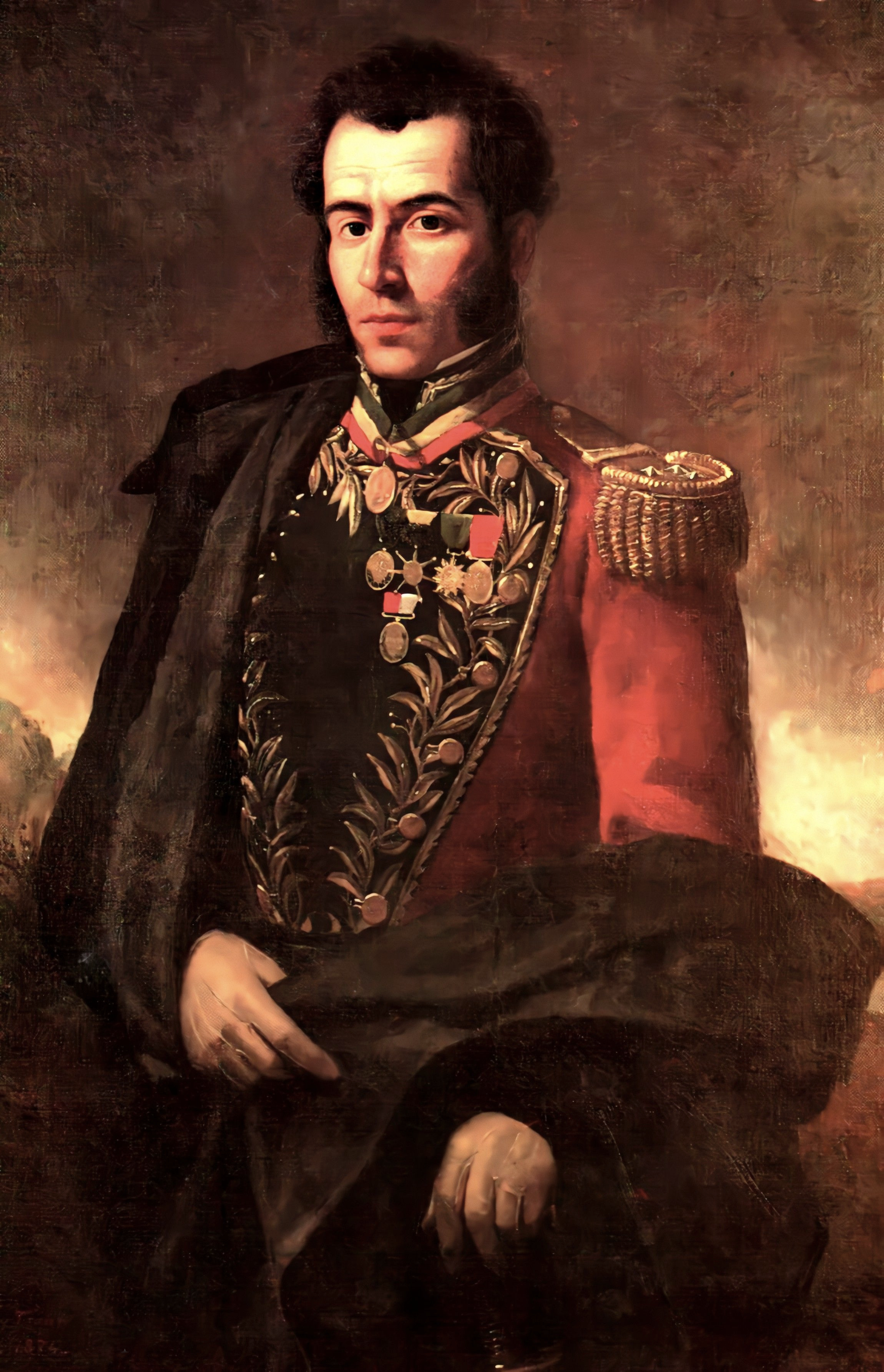
Antonio José de Sucre

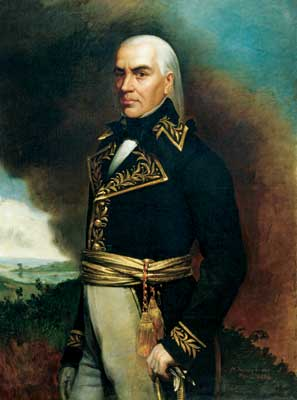
Francisco de Miranda

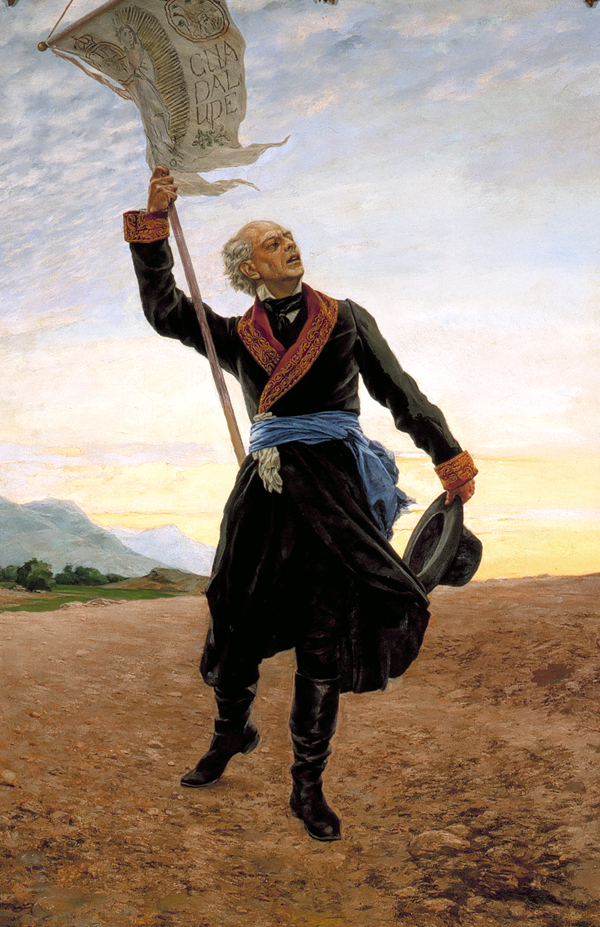
Miguel Hidalgo y Costilla

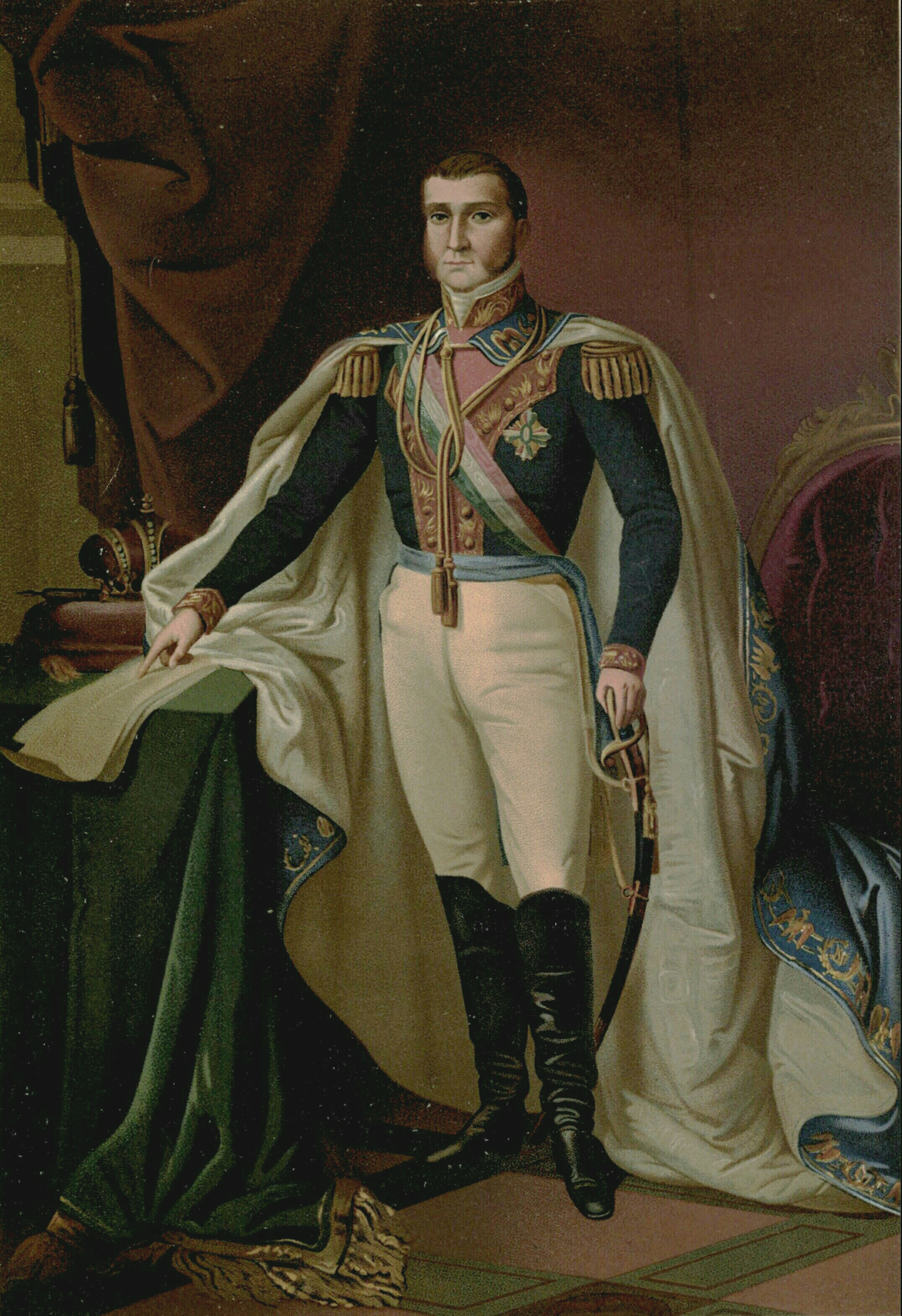
Agustín de Iturbide

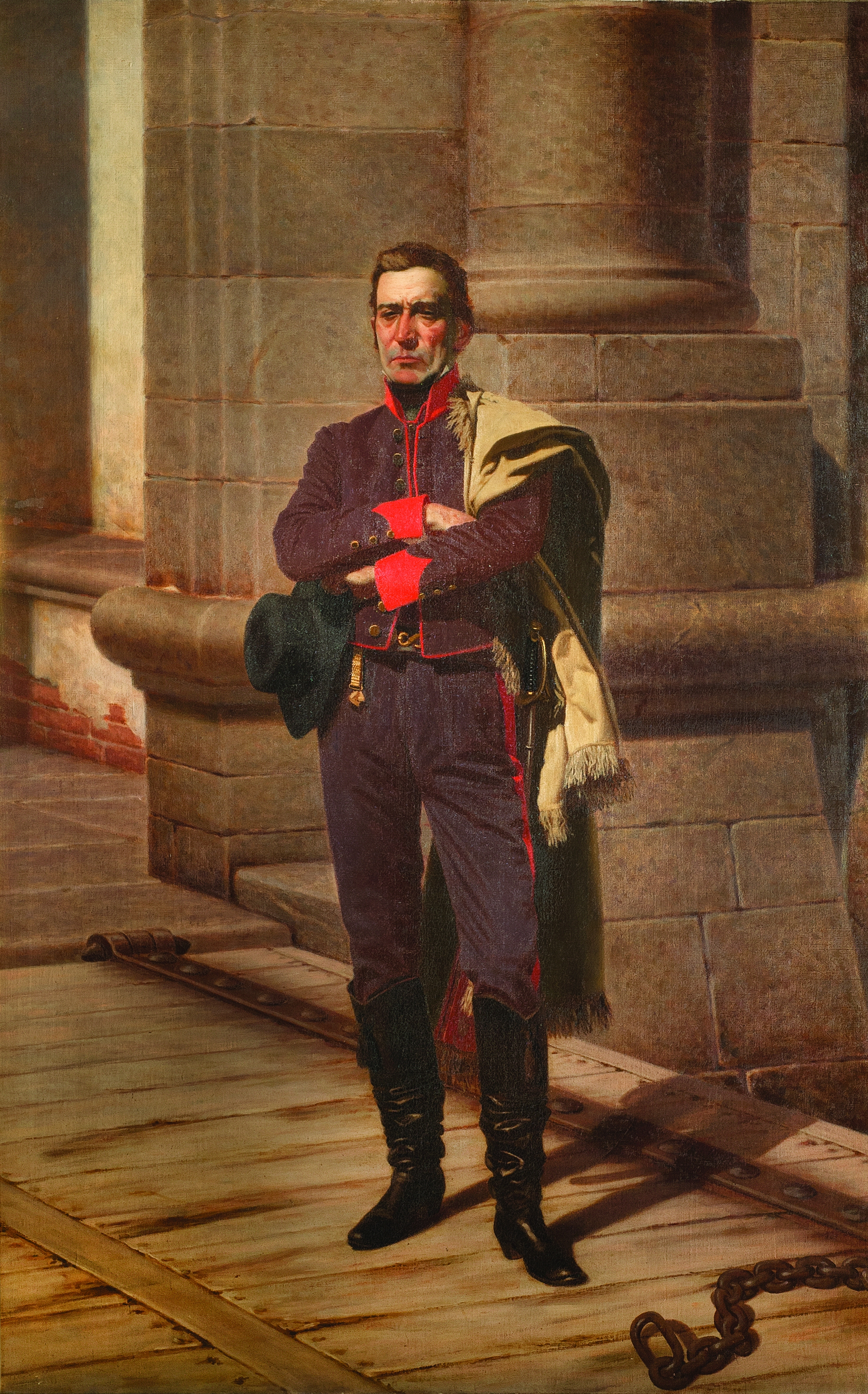
José Gervasio Artigas

== Early 19th-century caudillos ==
A number of strongmen went beyond raw struggles for power and its spoils and established "integrative dictatorships". These regimes attempted to curtail centrifugal forces, often termed "federalism", where regions or states of a nation-state had more autonomy and instead established the hegemony of the central government. According to political scientist Peter H. Smith, these include Juan Manuel de Rosas in Argentina; Diego Portales of Chile, whose system lasted nearly a century; and Porfirio Díaz of Mexico. Rosas and Díaz were military men, who continued to rely on armed forces to maintain themselves in power.

=== Mexico, Central America, and the Caribbean ===
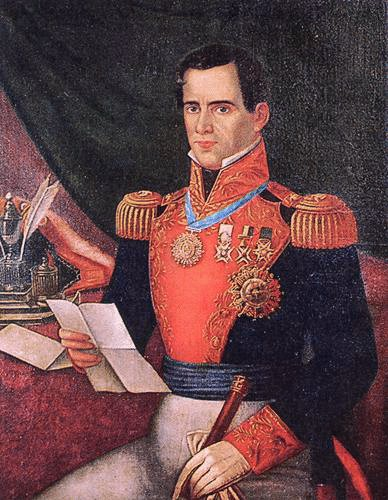
Santa Anna in a Mexican military uniform

This region was vulnerable to stronger powers, particularly the United States and the United Kingdom. Cuba remained in the hands of the Spanish crown until 1898. The United States seized a huge part of Mexico. Britain attempted to set up a protectorate on the Mosquito Coast of Central America. The two strongmen of this early century were Antonio López de Santa Anna in Mexico and Rafael Carrera in Guatemala.

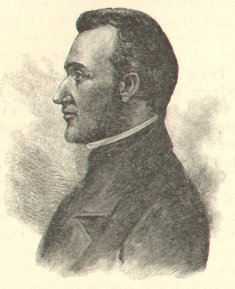
Francisco Morazán, president of the Federal Republic of Central America, 1829–1839

Mexico began its revolt against Spain in 1810, gaining independence in 1821. Political divisions in the postindependence period were labeled federalist, seeking a weak central government and often associated with liberalism, and centralist, who sought a strong central state and defense of traditional institutional structures, particularly the Mexican Army and the Roman Catholic Church. Many regional strongmen were in the Federalist-Liberal camp, which supported local control and the continuation of their power.

The quintessential Mexican caudillo, who gained national power for decades, was Santa Anna, who was initially a liberal, but became a conservative and sought strengthening of the central government. Following the Mexican–American War, regional caudillos, such as Juan Álvarez of the state of Guerrero and Santiago Vidaurri of Nuevo León-Coahuila, ousted Santa Anna in the Revolution of Ayutla, bringing liberals to power. Álvarez follows the pattern of the "folk caudillo", whom historian François Chevalier calls a "good cacique, [who] protected the mainly indigenous and mestizo peasants of Guerrero, who in turn gave him their loyalty". Álvarez briefly served as President of Mexico, returning to his home state, leaving ideological liberals to institute the era of La Reforma.

During the era of the Mexican Reform and the French intervention in Mexico, a number of generals had regional personal followings. Important figures whose local power had consequences nationally included Mariano Escobedo in San Luis Potosí, Ramón Corona in Jalisco and Durango, and Porfirio Díaz in parts of Veracruz, Puebla, and Oaxaca. Other caudillos had more local but still important power, including Gerónimo Treviño and Francisco Narajo in Nuevo León, Servando Canales and Juan Cortina in Tamaulipas, Florencio Antillón in Guanajuato, Ignacio Pesqueira in Sonora, Luis Terrazas in Chihuahua, and Manuel Lozada in Tepic.

Following the defeat of the French in 1867, the government of Benito Juárez and his successor following his death, Sebastián Lerdo de Tejada, faced opponents who objected to their increasingly centralist administrations. Those opponents gravitated to supporting Díaz, a military hero of the French intervention, who challenged Juárez and Lerdo by attempting rebellions, the second of which, the Plan of Tuxtepec, was successful in 1876. Juárez and Lerdo removed some caudillos from office, but this prompted them to rebel. These included Trinidad García de la Cadena in Zacatecas, Luis Mier y Terán in Veracruz, Juan Haro in Tampico, Juan N. Méndez in Puebla, Vicente Jiménez in Guerrero, and Juan Cortina in Matamoros. "That they slowly gathered around Porfirio Díaz is the story of the rise of Porfirian Mexico."

=== Bolivarian republics: Bolivia, Colombia, Ecuador, Peru, and Venezuela ===
Simón Bolívar, the foremost leader of independence in Spanish America, attempted to recreate the Viceroyalty of New Granada in the nation of Gran Colombia. As with other areas of Spanish America, centrifugal forces caused the country to fragment into separate nation-states. Bolivar saw the need for political stability, which could be put into effect with a president-for-life and the power to name his successor.

In 1828, his supporters called on him to assume dictatorial powers and "save the republic". The political turmoil continued and Bolívar stepped down in 1830, going into self-imposed exile and dying shortly thereafter. "He is revered as the one person who made the greatest contribution to Spanish American independence" and admired by both the political left for opposing slavery and distrust of the U.S. and the right, which admires his authoritarianism.

Veterans of the wars of independence assumed the leadership of the newly created nation-states, each with a new constitution. Despite constitutions and ideological labels of liberals and conservatives, personalist and opportunistic leaders dominated the early nineteenth century. As with Mexico and Central America, the political turmoil and penury of the governments of the Bolivarian republics prevented foreign investors from risking their capital there.

One caudillo who was progressive for his time was Bolivia's Manuel Isidoro Belzu, who served as the president from 1848 until 1855. The former president, Jose Miguel de Velasco, executed a coup for the presidency in 1848, promising the position of minister of war to Belzu, who seized power for himself once the coup was completed and cemented his position as president by quashing a counter-coup by Velasco. During his presidency, Belzu instituted several reforms to the country's economy in an effort to redistribute wealth more equitably. He rewarded the work of the poor and dispossessed. Like Paraguay's Jose Gaspar Rodriguez de Francia, Belzu chose to enact the aforementioned welfare programs because the idea of communalism was more in tune with the traditional values of native populations than the emphasis on private property that other caudillos embraced.

Belzu was also known for his nationalization of the country's profitable mining industry – he enacted protectionist policies to reserve Bolivian resources for Bolivian use, provoking the ire of British, Peruvian, and Chilean shipping and mining interests. Many of Belzu's policies won him favor among the long-downtrodden indigenous peoples of Bolivia, but came at the cost of enraging wealthy Creole Bolivians, as well as foreign countries such as Britain that sought to use resources from Bolivian mines. Belzu took steps to legitimize his leadership and was at one point democratically elected. Despite his popularity in many sectors, Belzu had many powerful enemies, and he survived 40 assassination attempts. His enemies wanted to destroy the state-run projects that helped nationalist program, but likewise improved the public sphere on which the country's poor were reliant.

The despotism that is so rife among the caudillos also found a home with Belzu; from the early 1850s until his abdication of power in 1855, he is said to have ruled despotically, making himself very wealthy in the process. Belzu considered returning to the presidency in 1861, but he was gunned down by one of his rivals by the time he tried to run for presidency again. He was unable to leave a legacy and his populist programs died with him. After Bolivia's independence, it lost half of its territory to neighboring countries, including Argentina, Chile, Peru, and Brazil, through the war and agreements reached under the threat of invasion.

=== Southern Cone: Argentina, Chile, Paraguay, and Uruguay ===
In contrast to most of Spanish America, postindependence Chile experienced political stability under the authoritarian rule of conservatives, backed by the landowning class. Although he never sought the presidency, cabinet minister Diego Portales (1793–1837) is credited with creating a strong, centralized regime that lasted 30 years. In general, Chile prospered with an export-oriented economy based on agriculture and mining, an exception to most of the Spanish-American regimes.

In the former Viceroyalty of Río de la Plata, political instability and violence were more typical of the era. In Argentina, Juan Manuel de Rosas (r. 1829–1852) dominated the Argentine confederation. He came from a wealthy landowning family, but also acquired large tracts of land in Buenos Aires Province. Rosas despised "the principles of political democracy and liberty [and] provided order in a region that had known near-anarchy since independence".

During his two-decade reign, Rosas rose to power and created an empire. He used his military experience to gain support from gauchos and estancias to create an army that would challenge the leadership of Argentina. After his rise to power using the rural workers, he changed his system in favor of using the military. He attempted to impose a ban on imported goods to help and win the support of the artisans in Argentina, but failed. He was forced to lift the ban on certain imports, like textiles, which opened a trade with Great Britain. Through his power over the imports and exports, the military, the police, and even the legislative branch of government, Rosas created a monopoly that ensured his remaining in power for over two decades. By the 1850s, Rosas was under attack by the very people who had helped him gain power. He was driven out of power and eventually ended up in Great Britain, where he died in 1877.

Uruguay attained independence from Brazil and Argentina and was ruled by Fructuoso Rivera. In Paraguay, José Gaspar Rodríguez de Francia (r. 1814–1840) was Supreme Dictator of the Republic, maintaining the landlocked country's independence from Argentina and other foreign powers. Sealed off from outside trade, Paraguay developed economic self-sufficiency under Francia. He based society on communal properties, rather than centralized authoritarianism, attempting to revert to the methods of the communal Indian society that existed previously in Paraguay.

After independence, the state gained control of the land that was once under control of the Church and the Spanish state. Francia created state ranches and rented out land for the use of citizens who were able to pay a fee. Francia's repressive measures included crushing the power of the elite American-born Spaniards and curbing the power of the Roman Catholic Church. Francia allowed for religious freedom and abolished the tithe. He actively encouraged miscegenation.

He has been a controversial figure in Hispanic American history: many modern historians credit him with bringing stability to Paraguay, preserving independence, and "bequeathing to his successors an egalitarian, homogeneous nation". However, because of his crackdown on the wealthy elite and the subsequent weakening of their power, he was accused of anticlericalism. Nevertheless, Paraguay prospered under Francia in terms of economics and trade through a trade route with Buenos Aires, which was opposed by the wealthy Argentinian elites. "Sometimes counted among the dictators of the era, contemporary history has viewed Francia as an honest, populist leader who promoted sovereign economic prosperity in a war-torn Paraguay."

=== Gallery ===
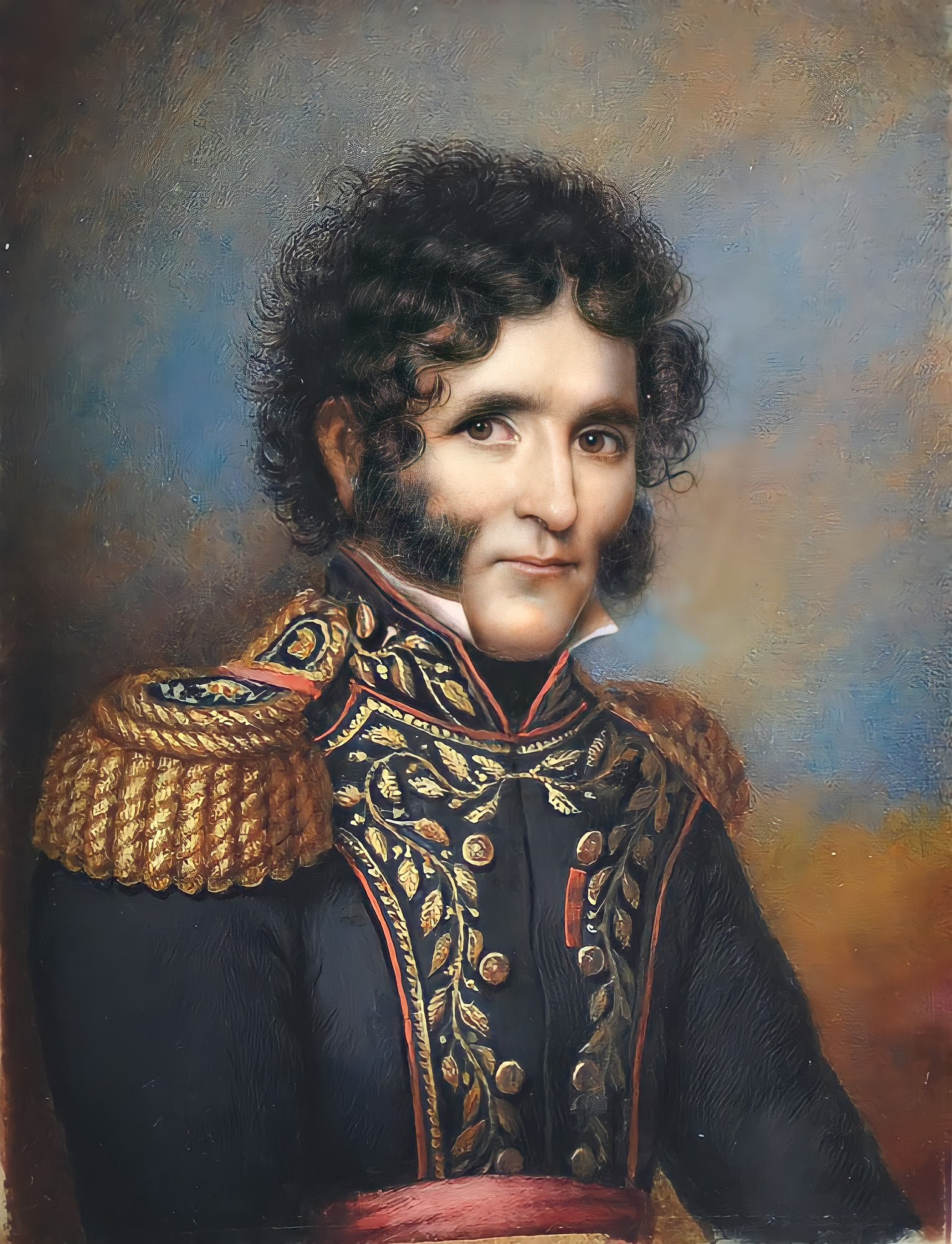
Facundo Quiroga, Argentina

Manuel Isidoro Belzu, Bolivia

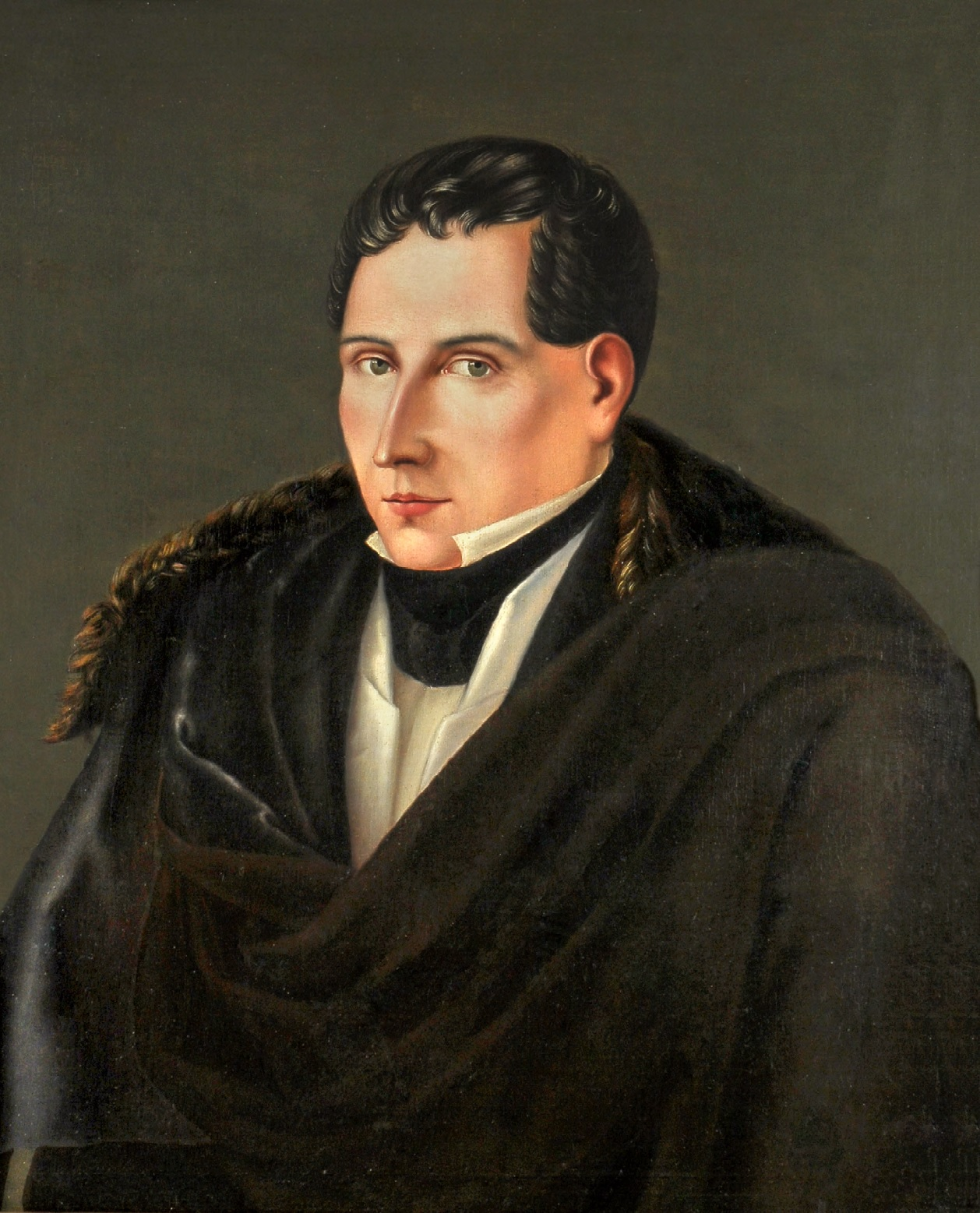
Diego Portales, Chile

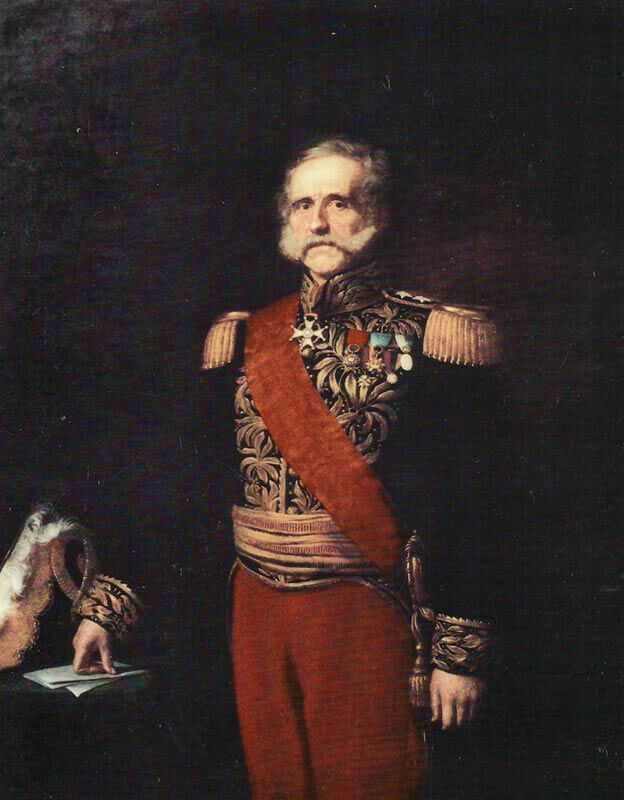
Tomás Cipriano de Mosquera, Colombia

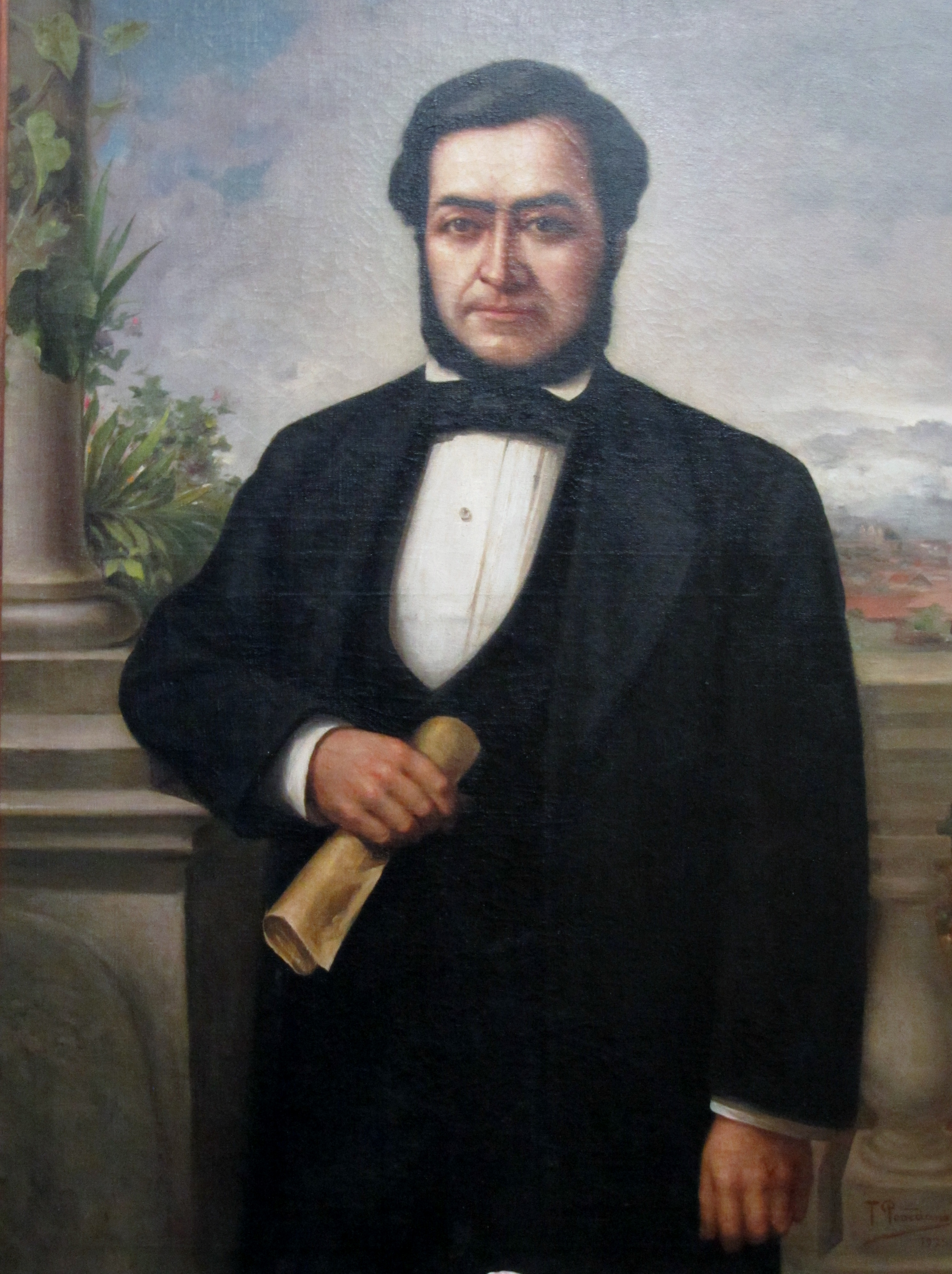
Juan Rafael Mora Porras, Costa Rica

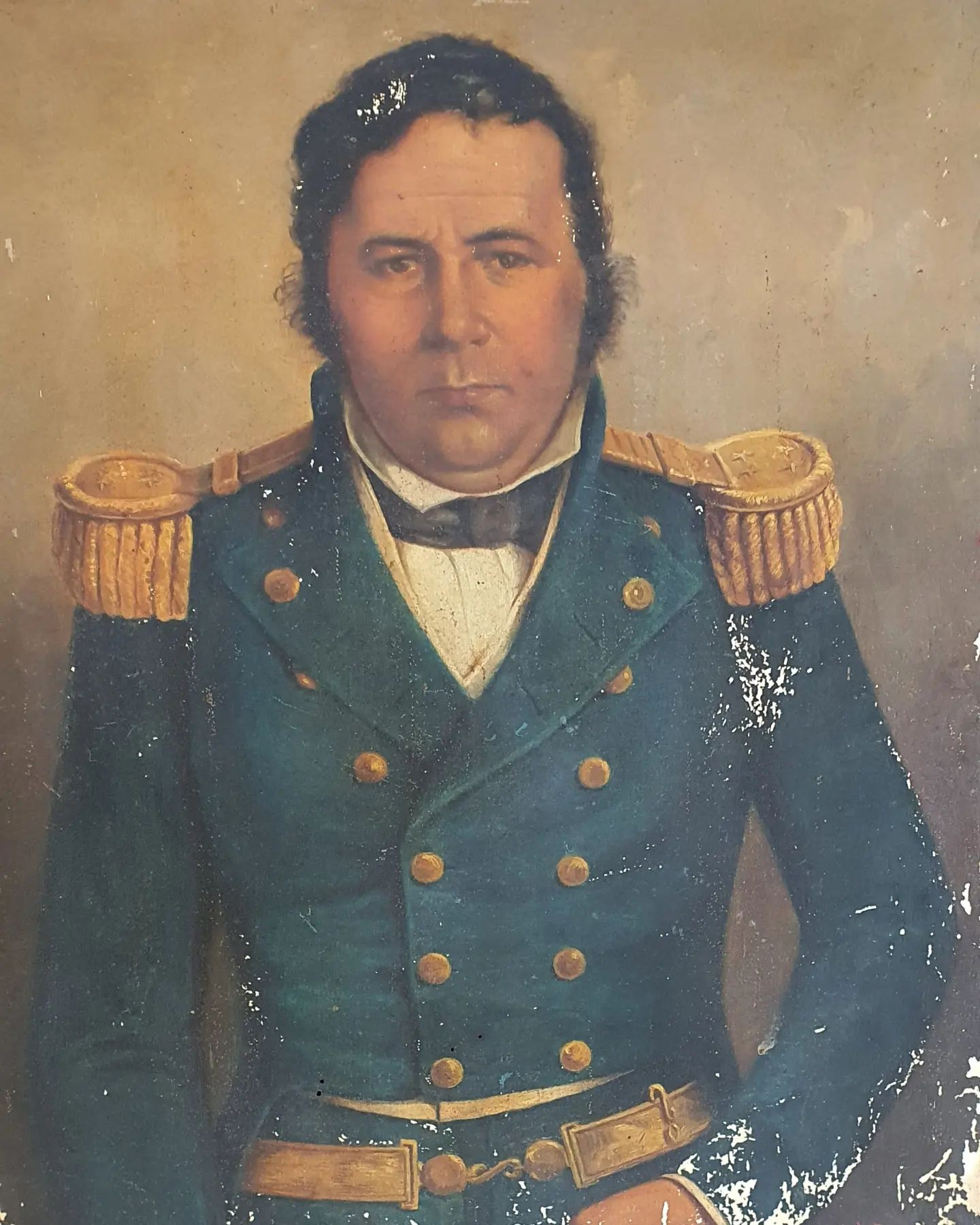
Pedro Santana, Dominican Republic

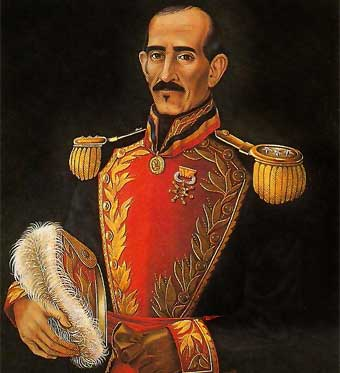
Juan José Flores, Ecuador

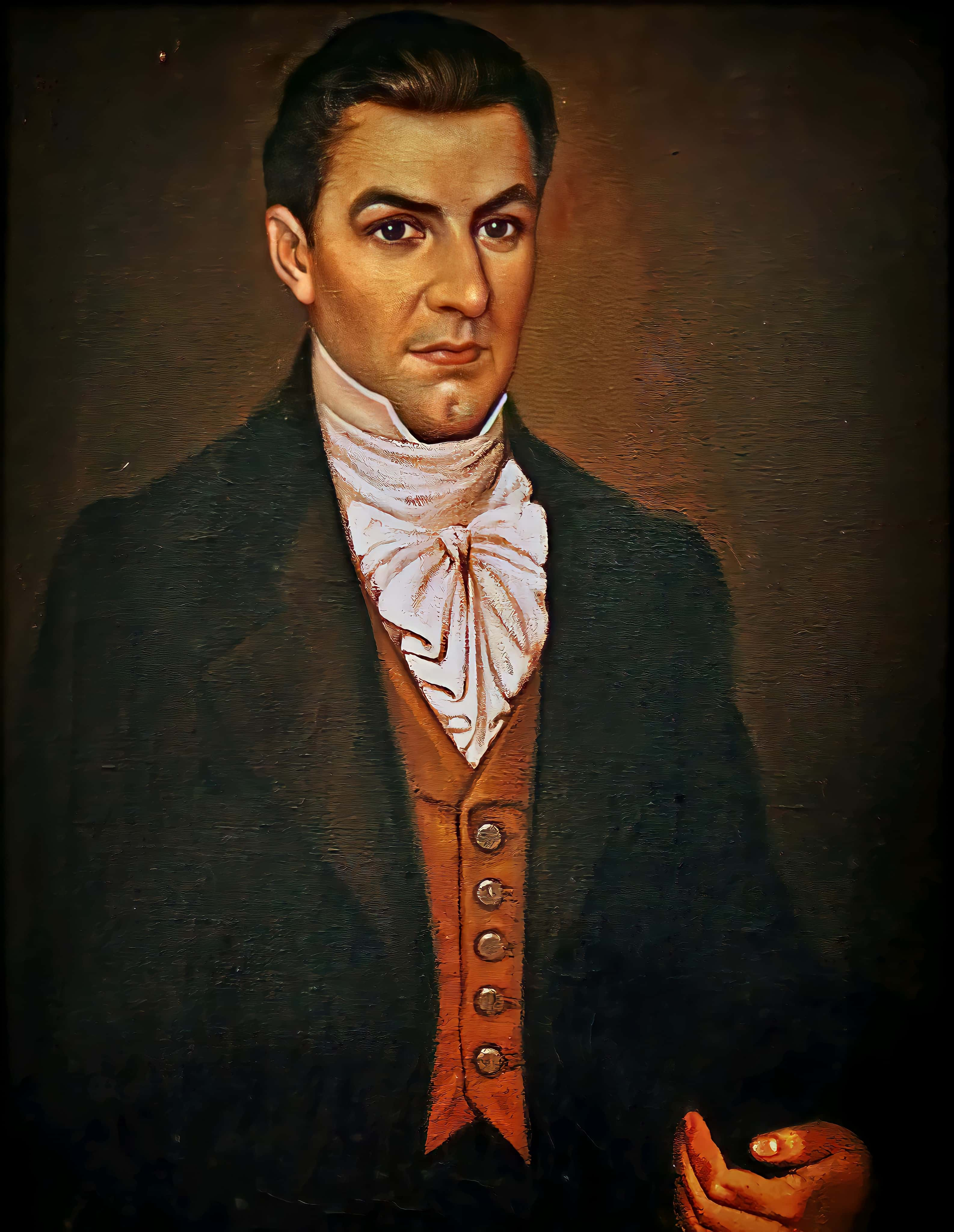
Manuel José Arce, El Salvador

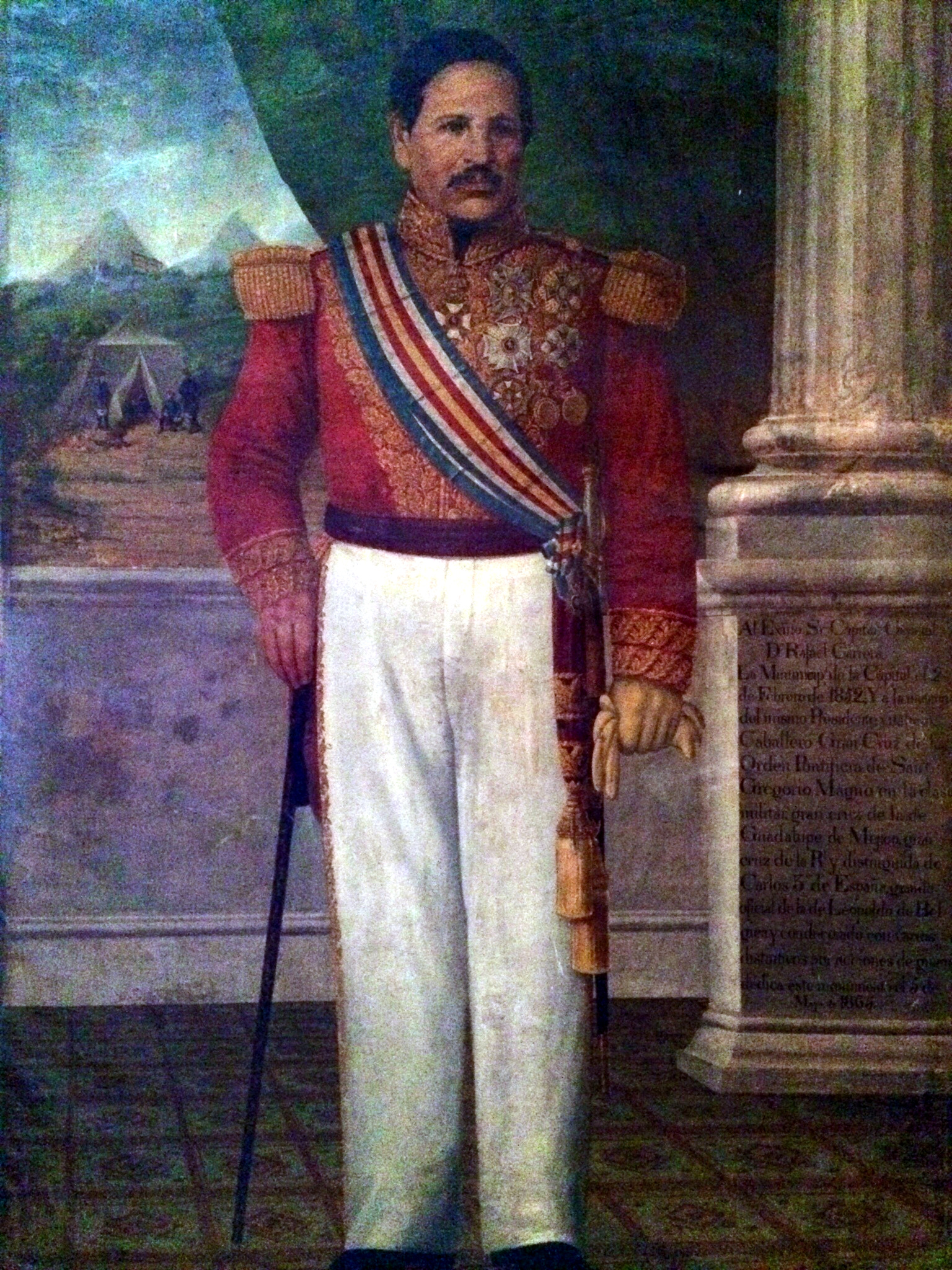
Rafael Carrera, Guatemala

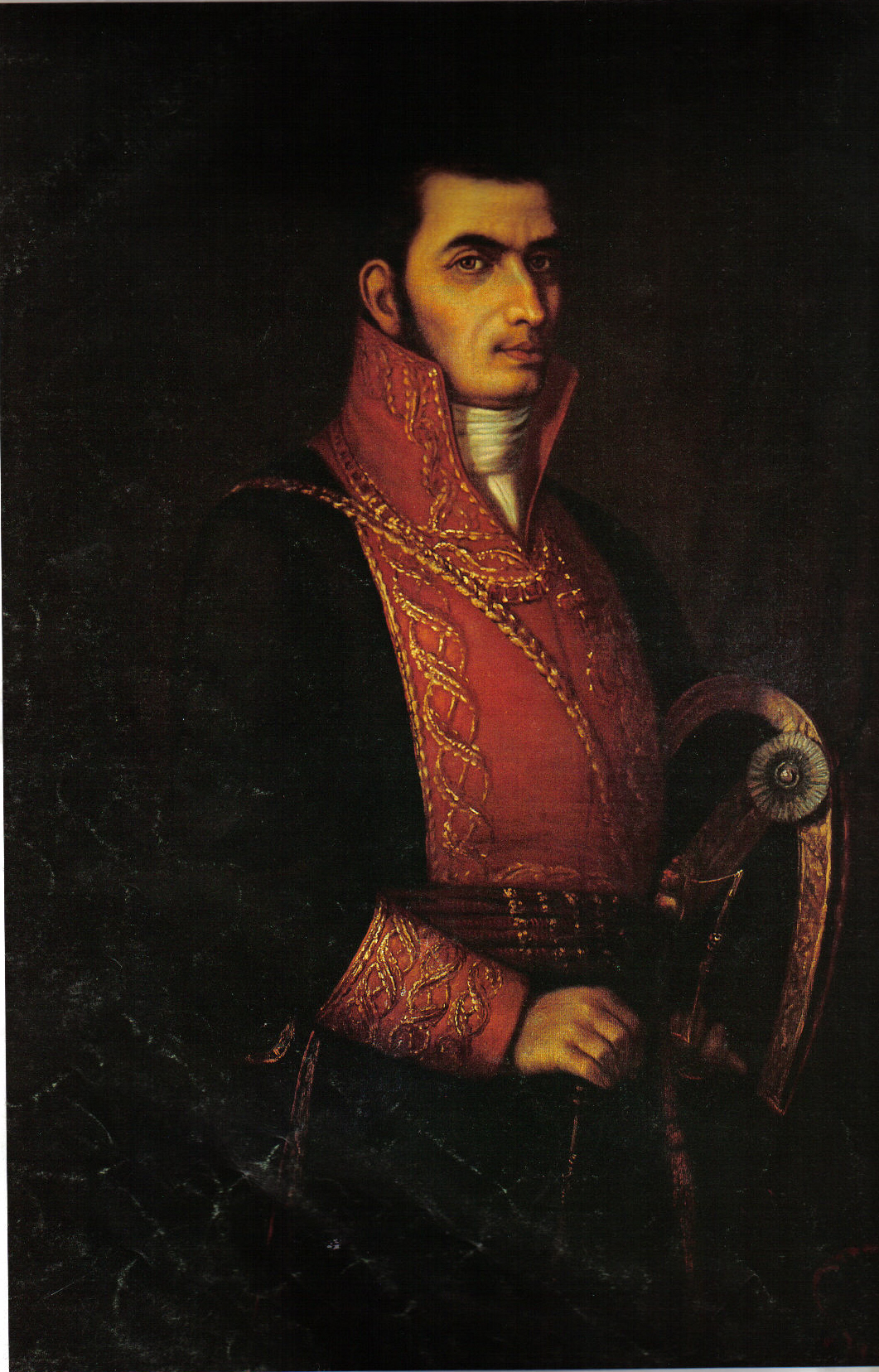
José María Morelos, Mexico

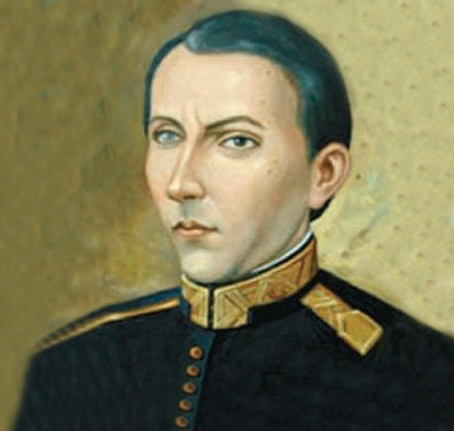
José Anacleto Ordóñez, Nicaragua

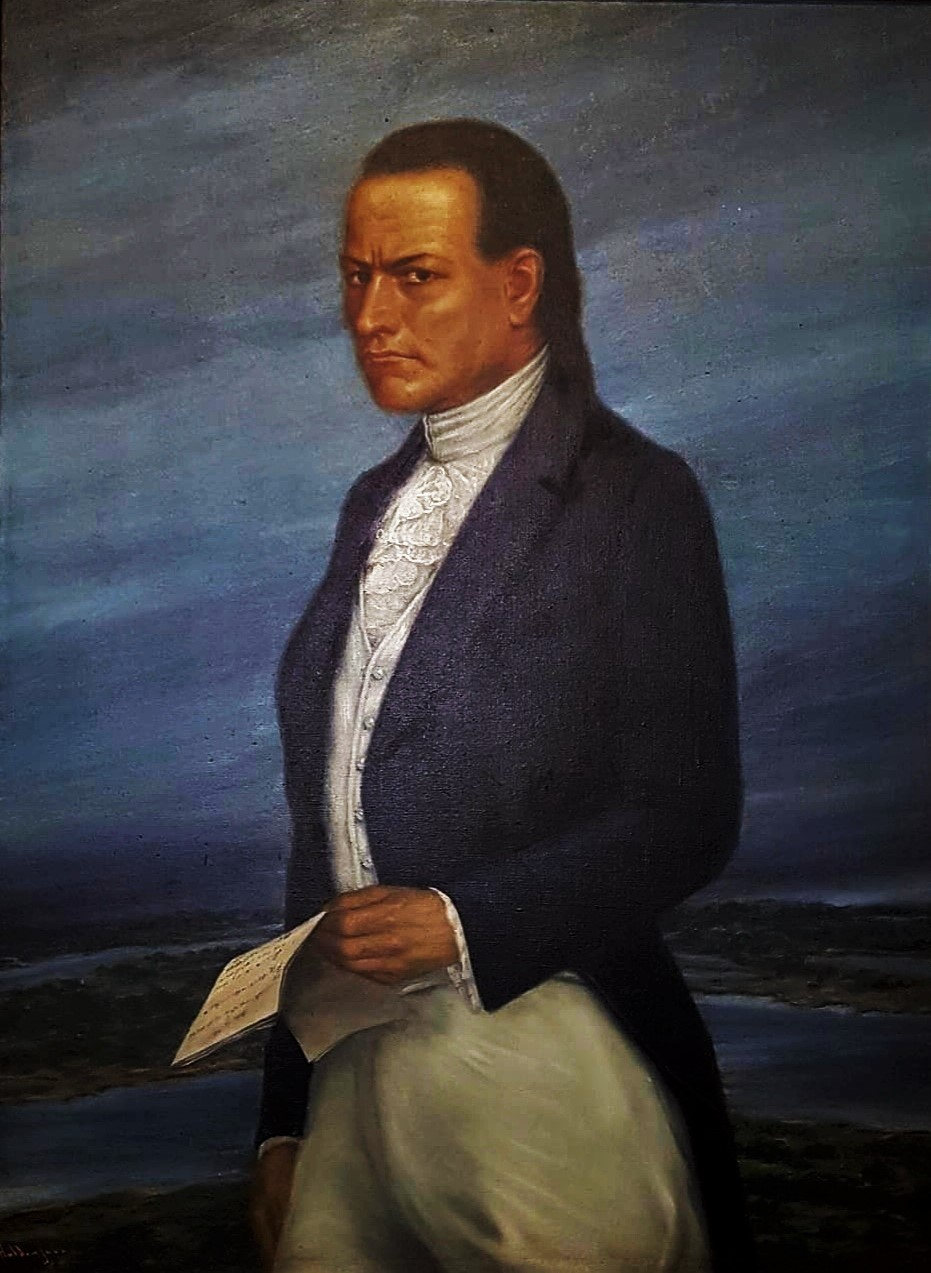
Gaspar Rodríguez de Francia, Paraguay

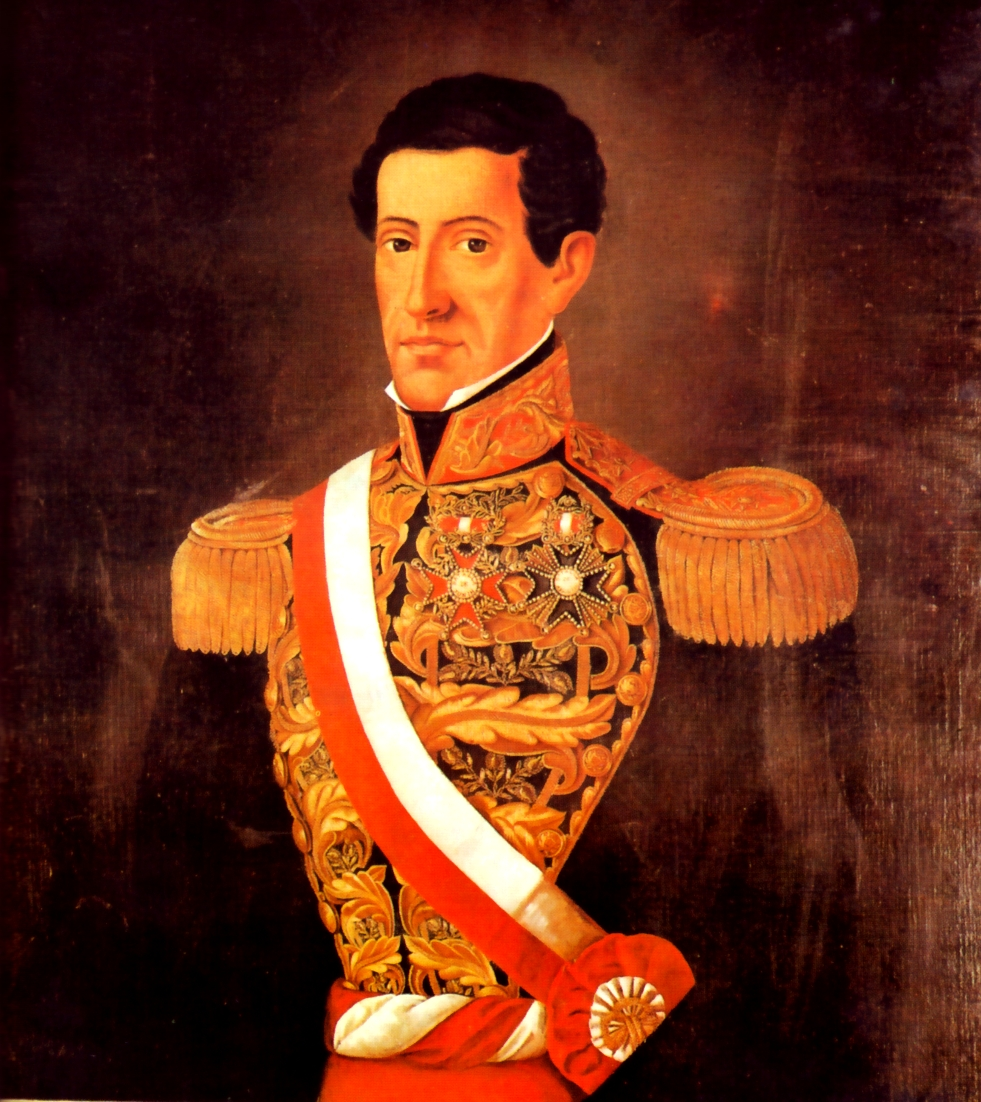
Agustín Gamarra, Peru

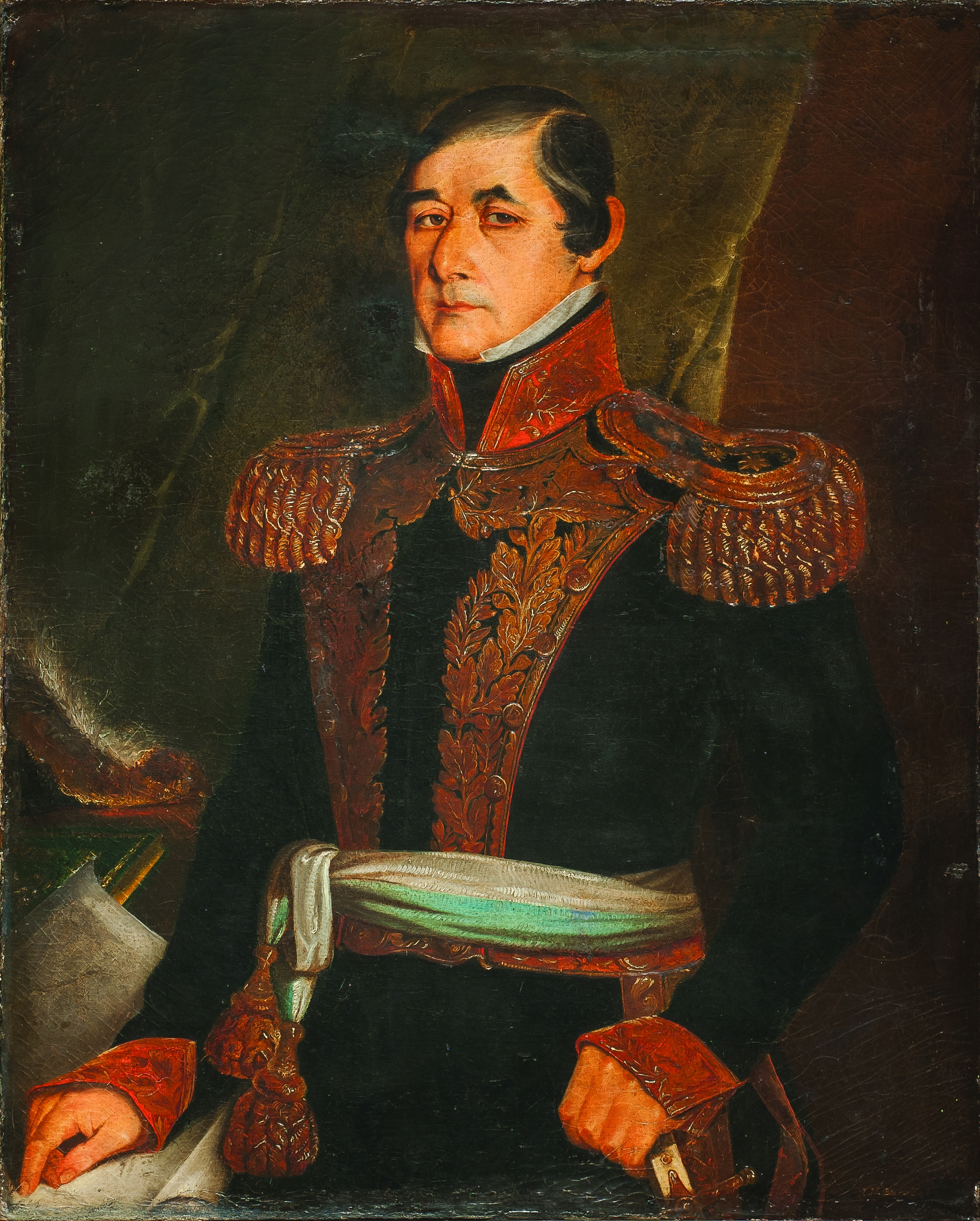
Fructuoso Rivera, Uruguay

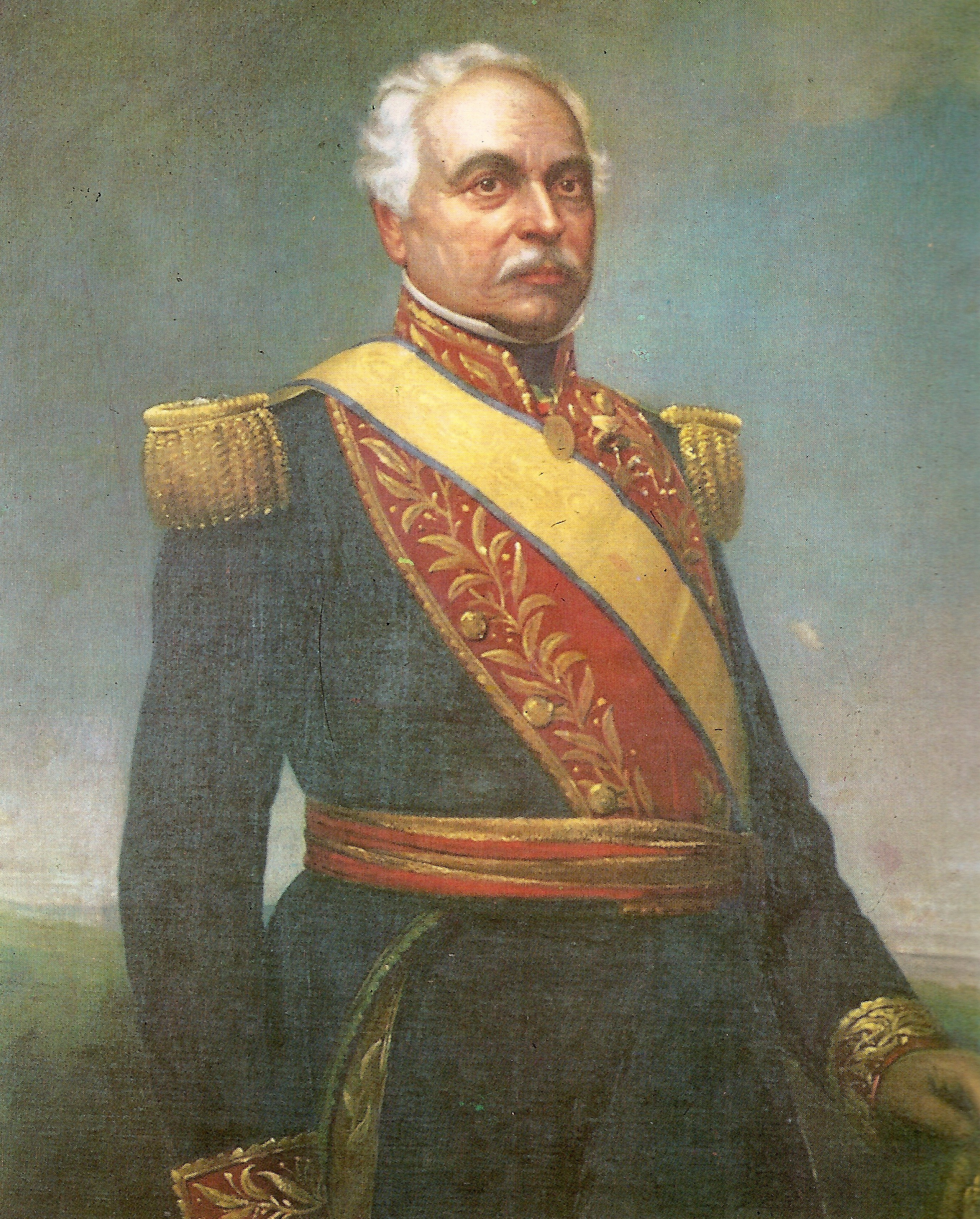
José Antonio Páez, Venezuela

== Caudillos in the late nineteenth and twentieth centuries ==
In the late nineteenth century, regimes in Spanish America were more stable and often less dominated by military men. Foreign investors, particularly the British, began building infrastructure in countries of greatest interest to the UK's economic needs. Such projects included railways, telegraph lines, and port facilities, which cut transportation time and costs and sped up communications. Stable political regimes that could ensure the security of foreign investments, facilitate extraction of resources, and production of agricultural crops and animals were the necessary structures. Industrialization also took hold in a few countries (Mexico, Argentina, Colombia) to produce consumer goods locally.

In general, foreign governments and entrepreneurs had no interest in directly administering countries of Hispanic America in a formal colonial arrangement so long as their interests could be nurtured by modernizing national governments, often seen as neocolonialism. There are a number of examples of continuismo in Hispanic America whereby presidents continue in office beyond the legal term limits, with constitutional revision, plebiscites, and the creation of family dynasties, such as the Somoza family in Nicaragua.

=== Mexico ===
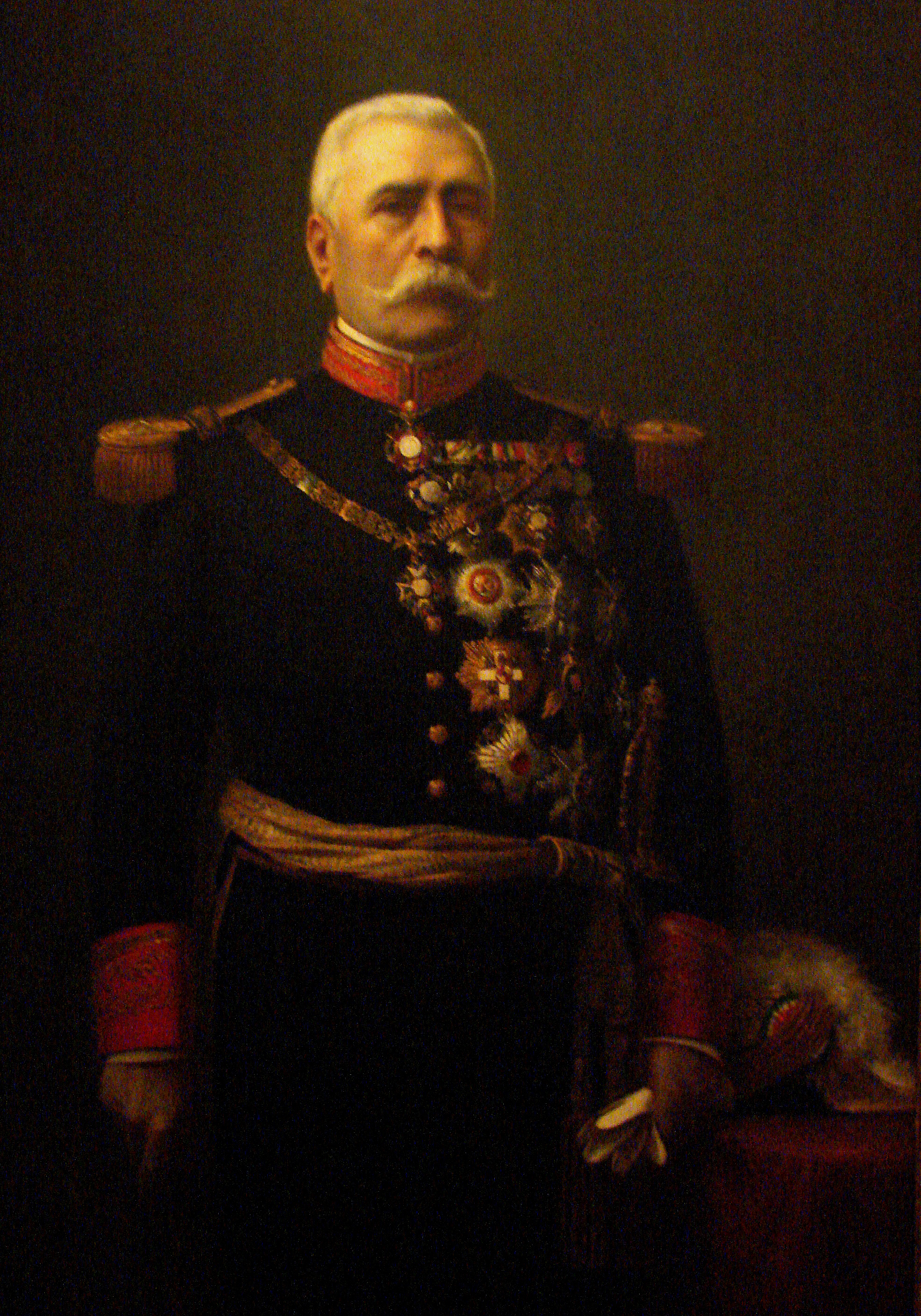
General Porfirio Díaz, president of Mexico 1876–1911

A major example of a modernizing caudillo of the late nineteenth century is Díaz (r. 1876–1911), whose period of control is known as the Porfiriato. His slogan was "order and progress", which was enforced by armed men controlled by the president, the Rurales. Díaz was averse to being dependent on the Mexican army, since as a general and leader of a coup d'état himself, he knew their potential for intervening in national politics. Díaz coopted or crushed regional opposition to his regime, creating a political machine to forward his vision of modern Mexico.

Desirous of economic development that necessitated foreign investment, Díaz sought capital and expertise from European powers (Britain, France, and Germany) to offset the closer power of the United States. Although elections were held in Mexico at regular intervals, they were by nature not democratic. The huge rural, illiterate, and mostly indigenous populations were more to be feared by the government than as a source for regime support. When Díaz failed to find a political solution to his succession, the Mexican Revolution erupted after the fraudulent 1910 general election.

Diaz came to power by a coup under the Plan of Tuxtepec and became president of Mexico 1876–1880. He was succeeded by his military and political compadre Manuel González (1880–1884) and returned to the presidency until he was overthrown in 1911 in the Mexican Revolution.

During the decade-long civil war, a number of regional caudillos arose. Pascual Orozco helped oust Díaz at the early stage of the Revolution, but then turned against Francisco I. Madero, who had been elected to the presidency in 1911. Pancho Villa also helped oust Díaz, supported Madero, and following his murder in 1913, became a general in the Constitutionalist Army commanded by civilian Venustiano Carranza. Emiliano Zapata, peasant leader from the state of Morelos, opposed Díaz and every subsequent Mexican government until his murder in 1919 by Carranza's agents.

Álvaro Obregón emerged as another brilliant general from northern Mexico, defeating Villa's Division of the North in 1915 after Villa had broken with Carranza. Obregón and fellow Sonoran generals Plutarco Elías Calles and Adolfo de la Huerta overthrew Carranza in 1920 under the Plan of Agua Prieta, with the presidency in the 1920s going in turn from de la Huerta, to Obregón, to Calles, and back to Obregón. During Calles's presidency (1924–1928), he stringently enforced the anticlerical laws of the Mexican Constitution of 1917, leading to the Cristero War, a failed major uprising under the leadership of some regional caudillos, including Saturnino Cedillo of San Luis Potosí.

Obregón was elected again in 1928, but was assassinated before he could again resume the presidency. In 1929, Plutarco Elías Calles founded a political party, then known as the Partido Nacional Revolucionario (PNR), and became the jefe máximo (maximum chief), the power behind the presidency in a period known as the Maximato (1928–1934); PNR's iteration as the Institutional Revolutionary Party dominated Mexican politics until 2000 and functioned as a brake on the personalist power of regional caudillos in Mexico.

=== Central America ===
With the improvement of transportation, tropical products such as coffee and bananas could be transported to a growing consumer market in the United States. In Guatemala Justo Rufino Barrios ruled as a Liberal autocrat and expanded coffee cultivation.

=== Gallery ===
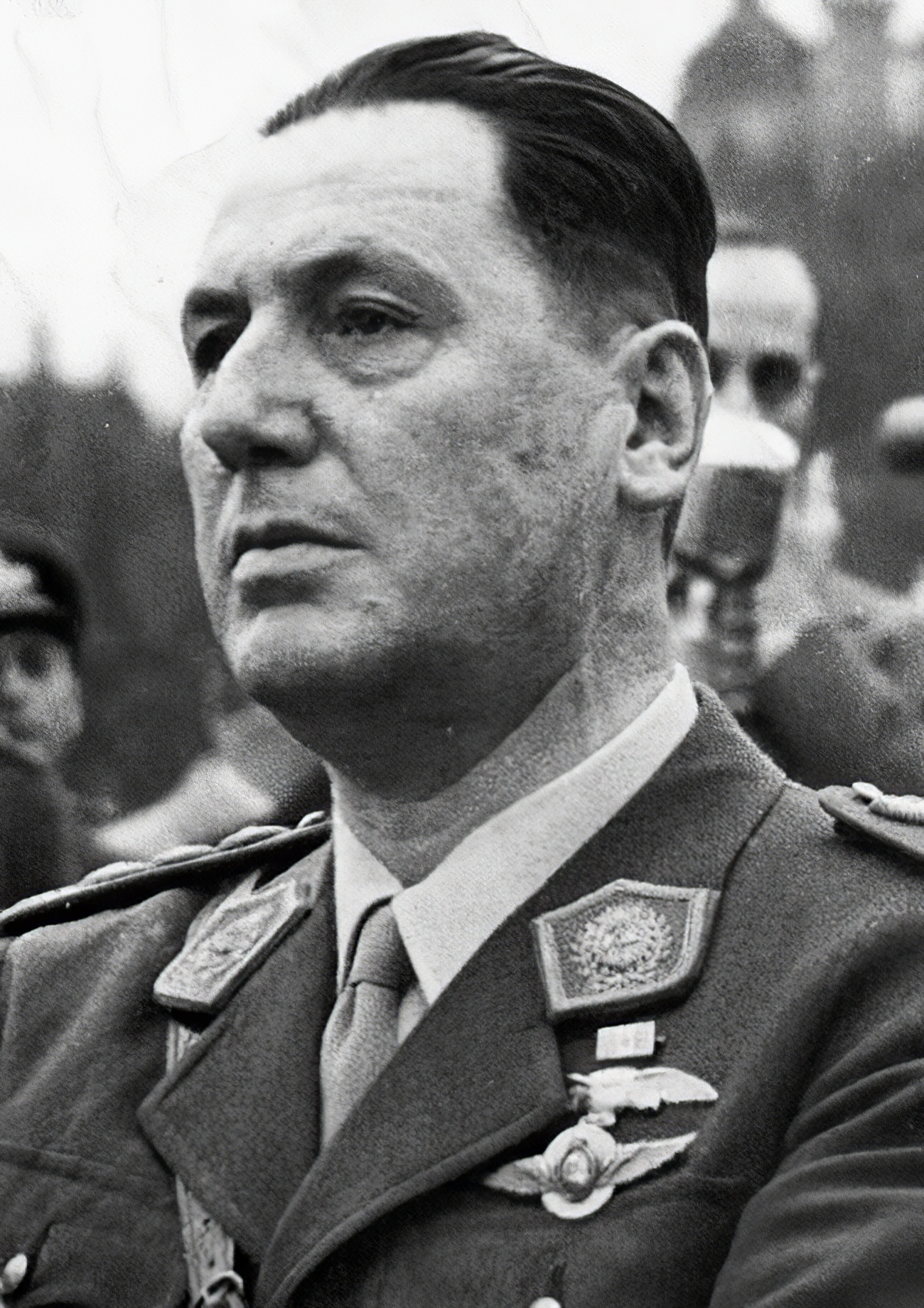
Juan Perón, Argentina

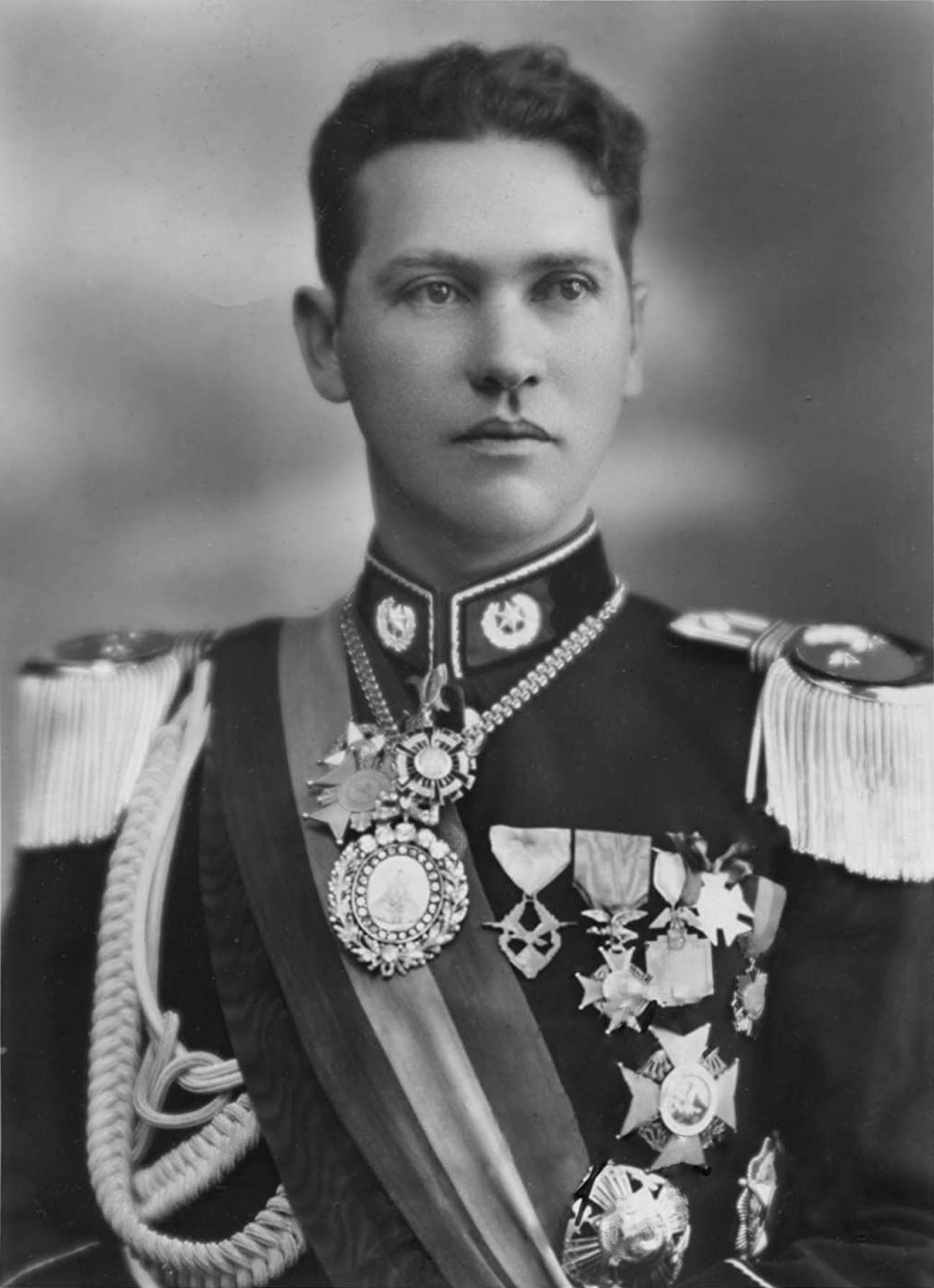
Germán Busch, Bolivia

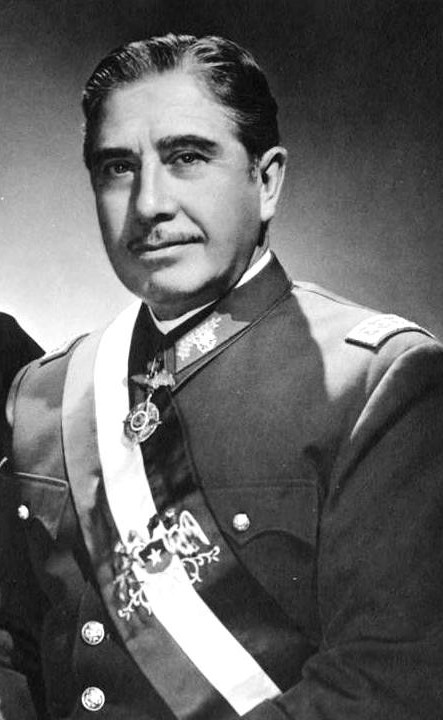
Augusto Pinochet, Chile

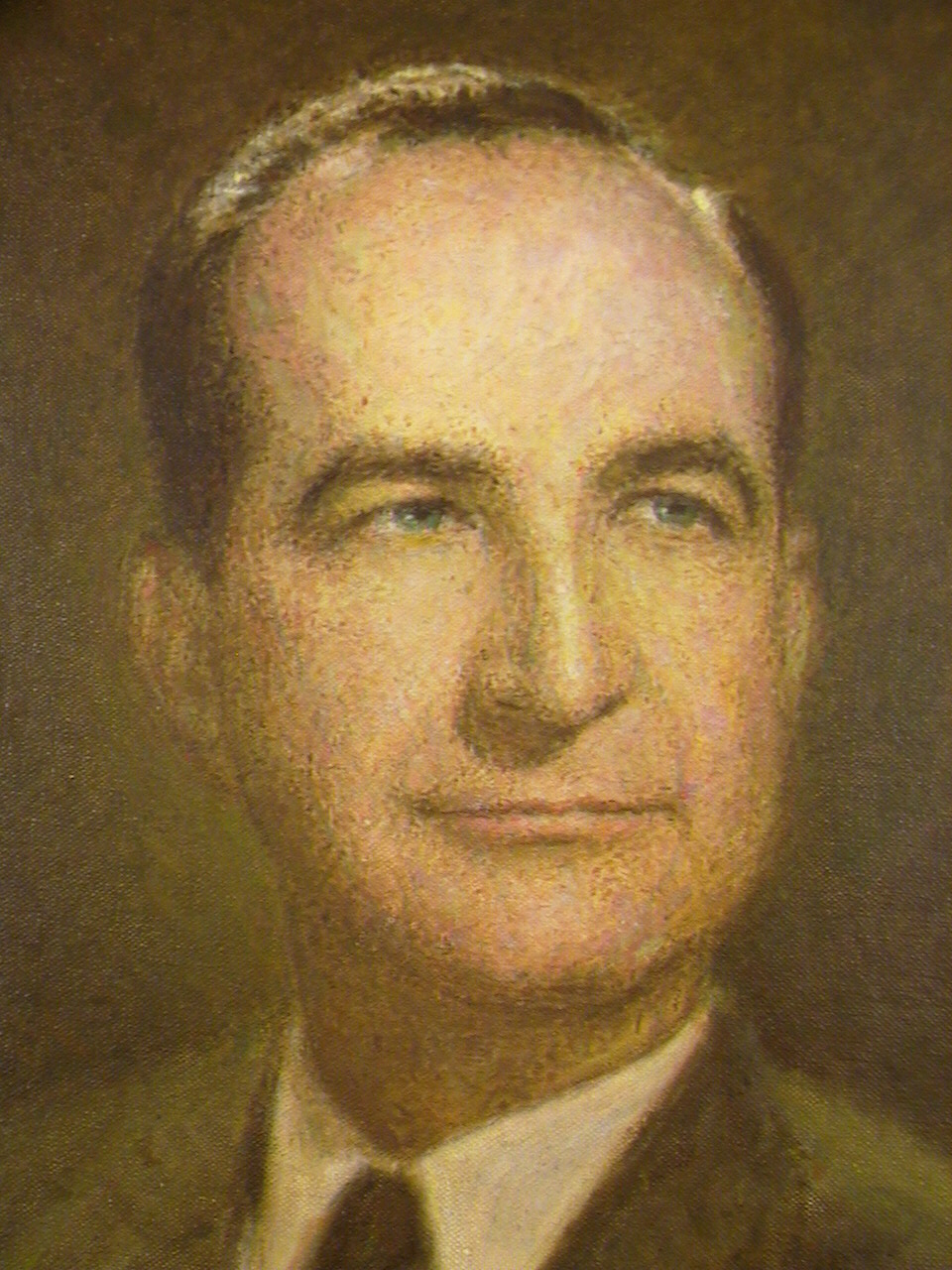
José Figueres Ferrer, Costa Rica

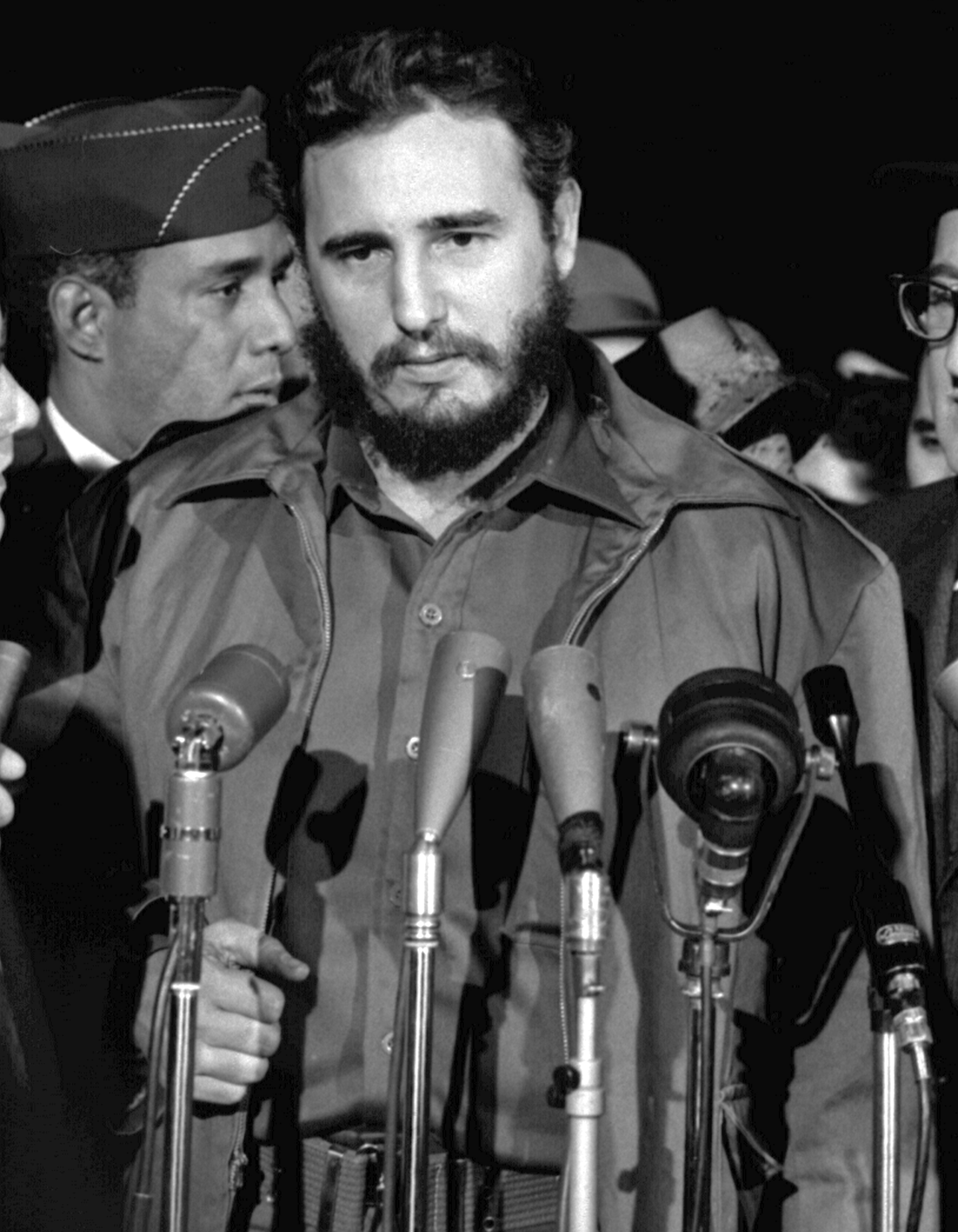
Fidel Castro, Cuba

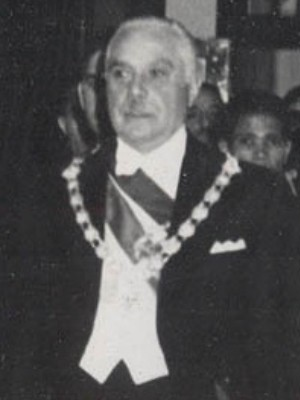
Rafael Trujillo, Dominican Republic

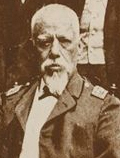
Eloy Alfaro, Ecuador

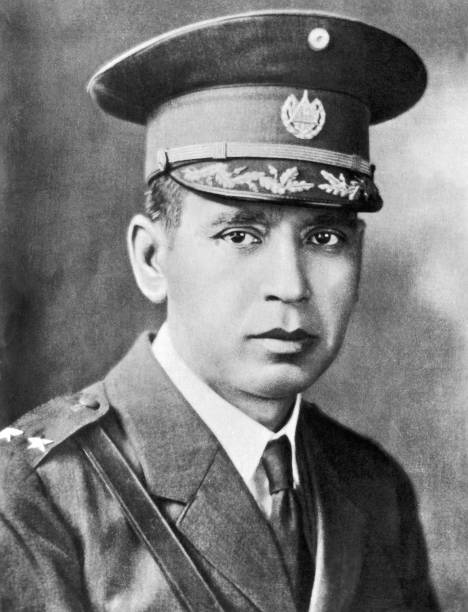
Maximiliano Hernández Martínez, El Salvador

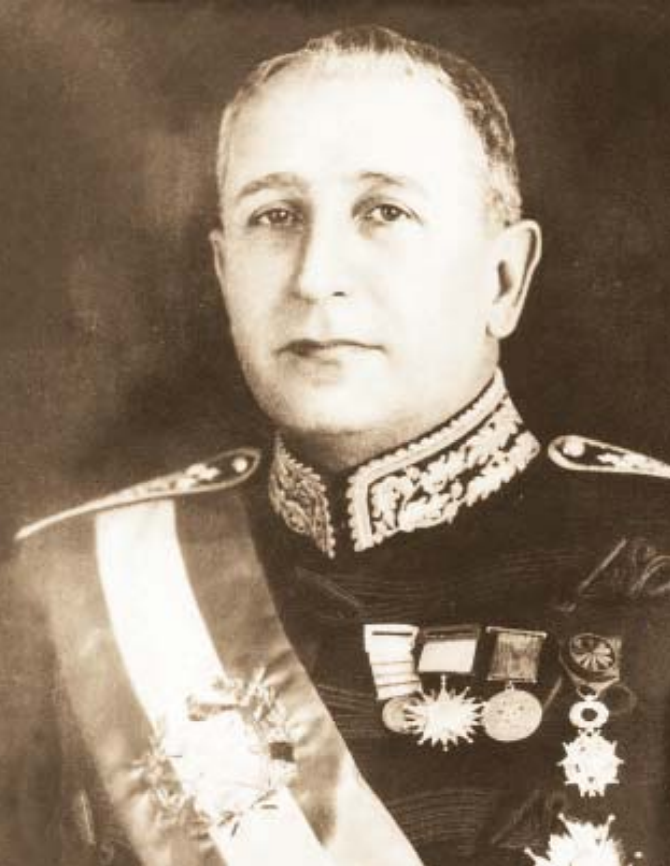
Jorge Ubico, Guatemala

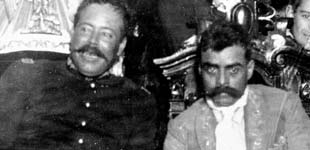
Pancho Villa (left) and Emiliano Zapata, Mexico

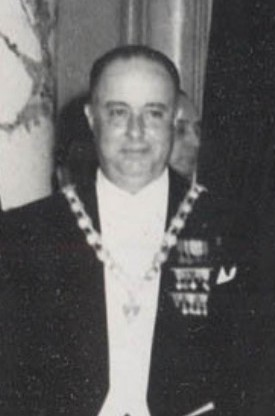
Anastasio Somoza García, Nicaragua

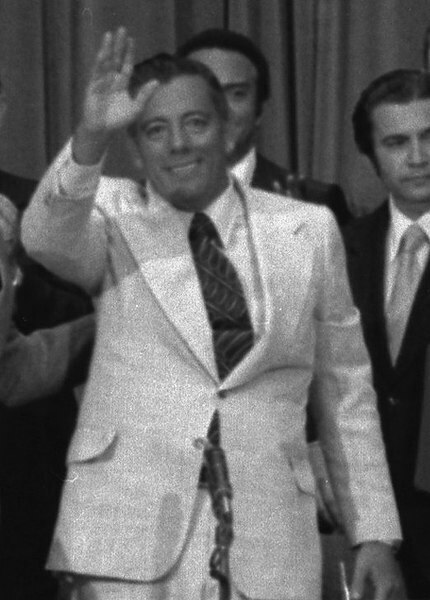
Omar Torrijos, Panama

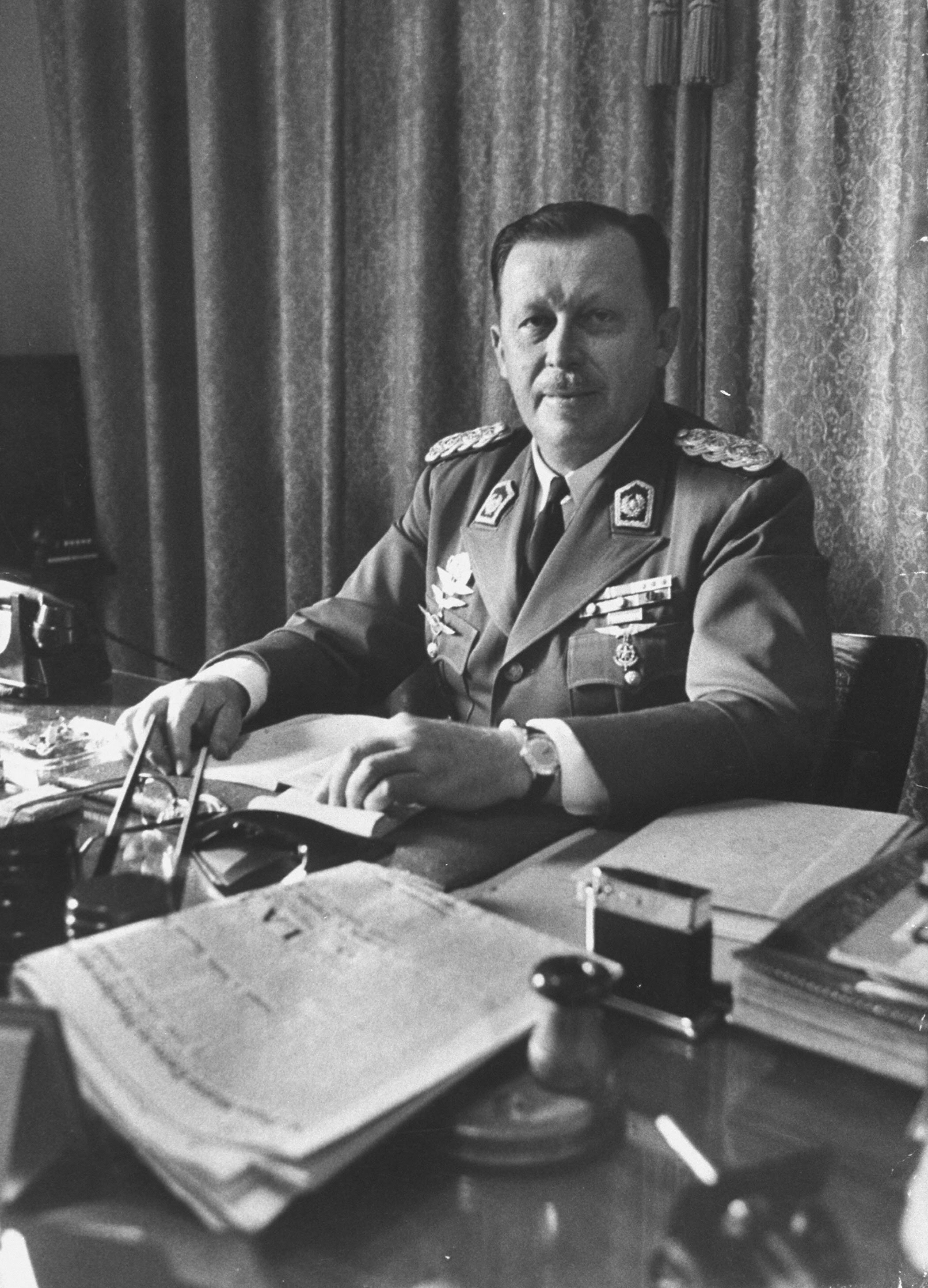
Alfredo Stroessner, Paraguay

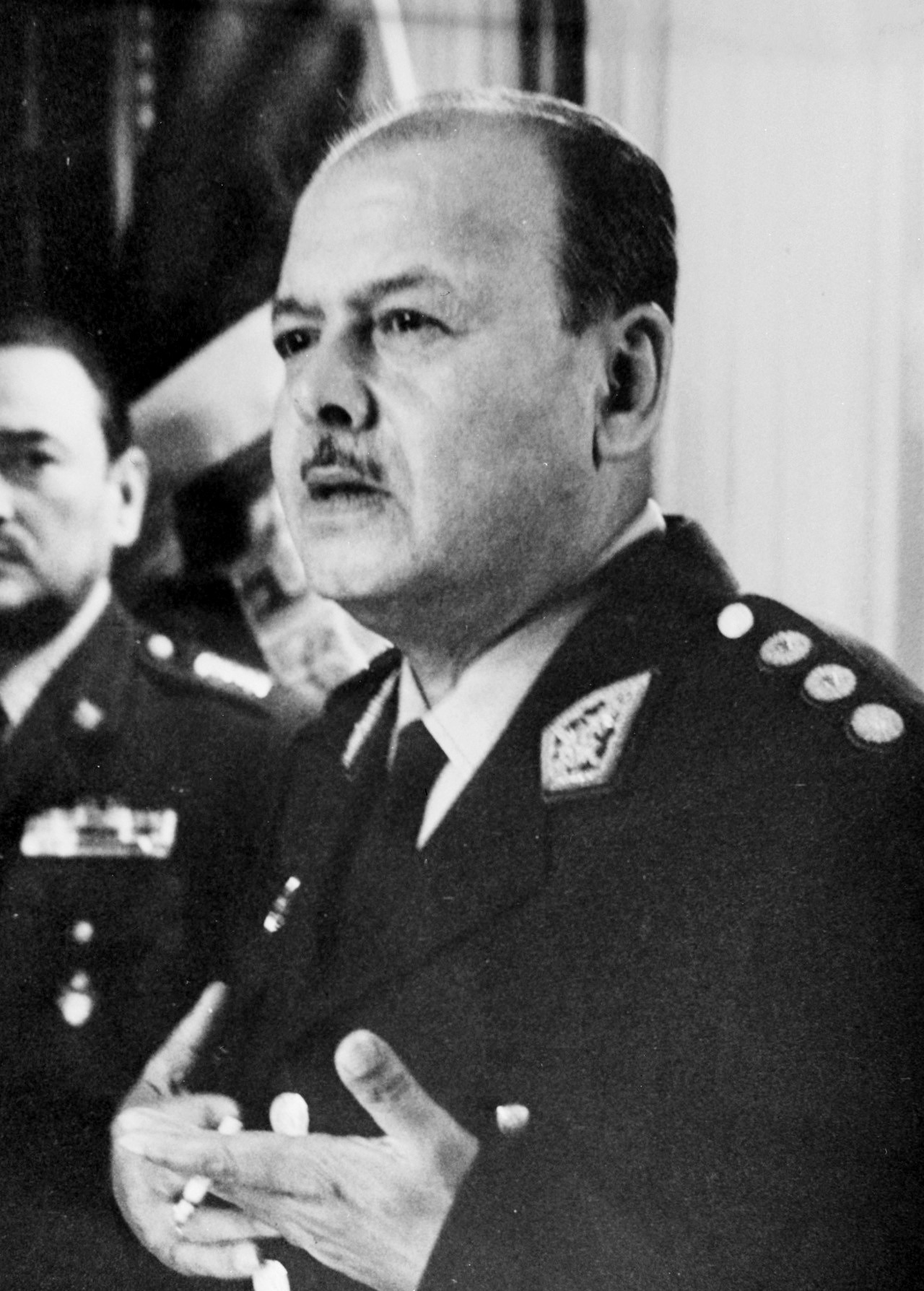
Juan Velasco Alvarado, Peru

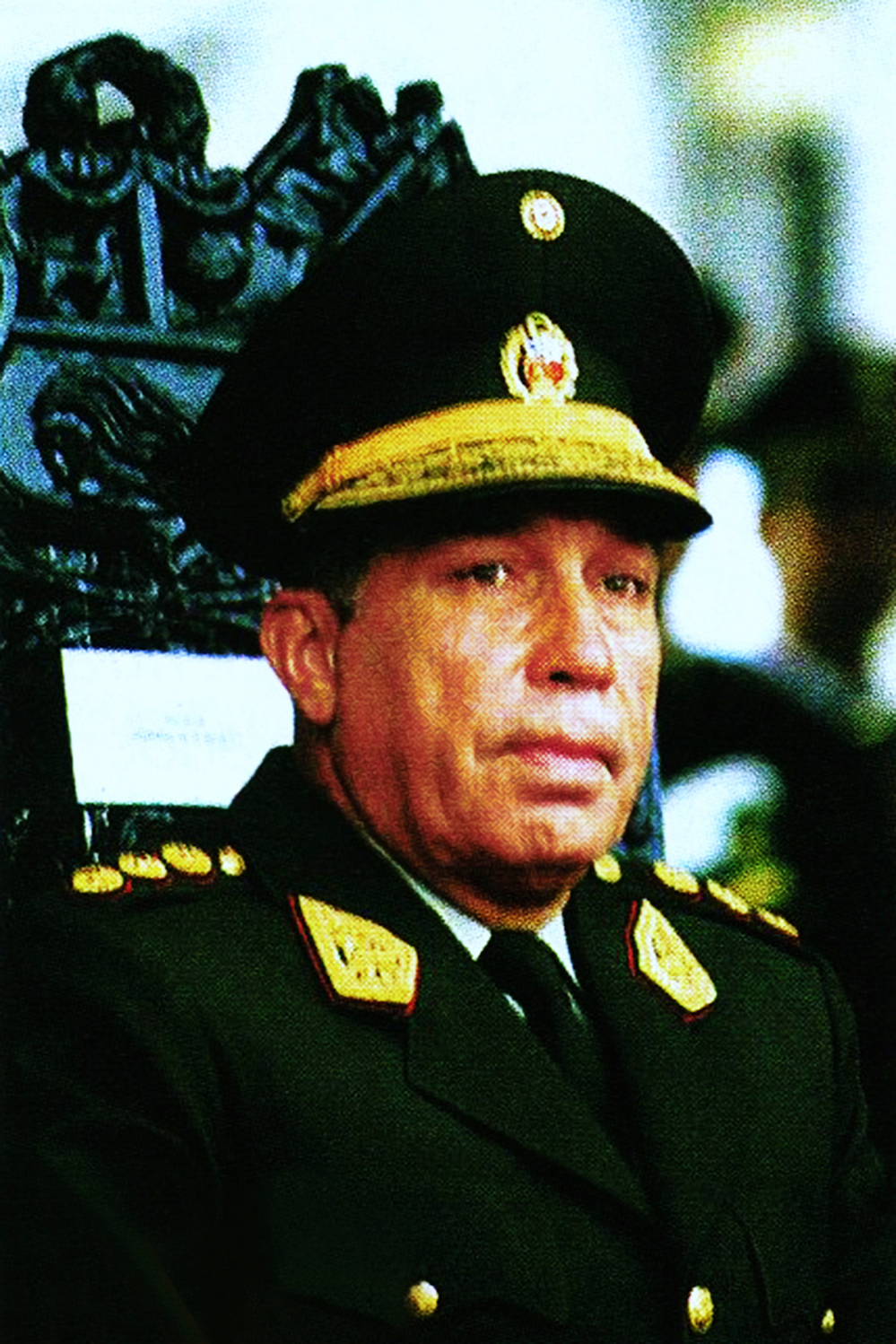
Francisco Morales Bermúdez, Peru

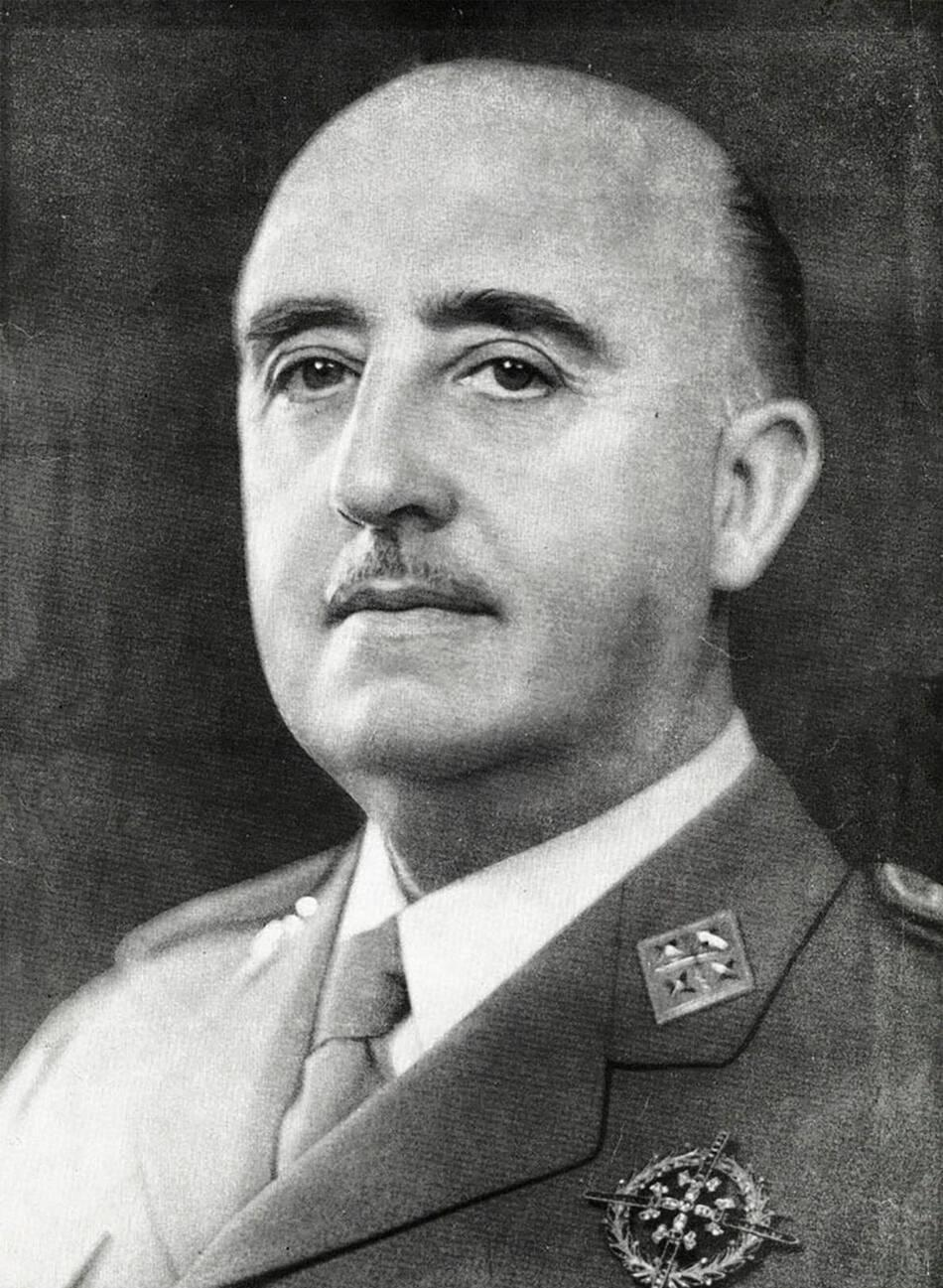
Francisco Franco y Bahamonde, Spain

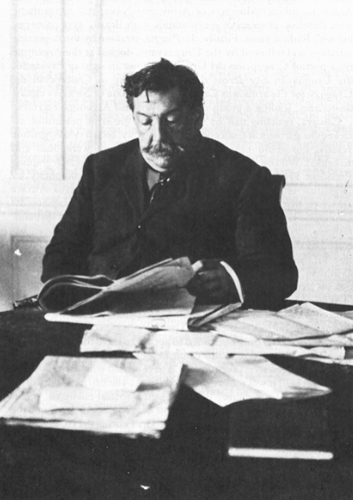
José Batlle y Ordóñez, Uruguay

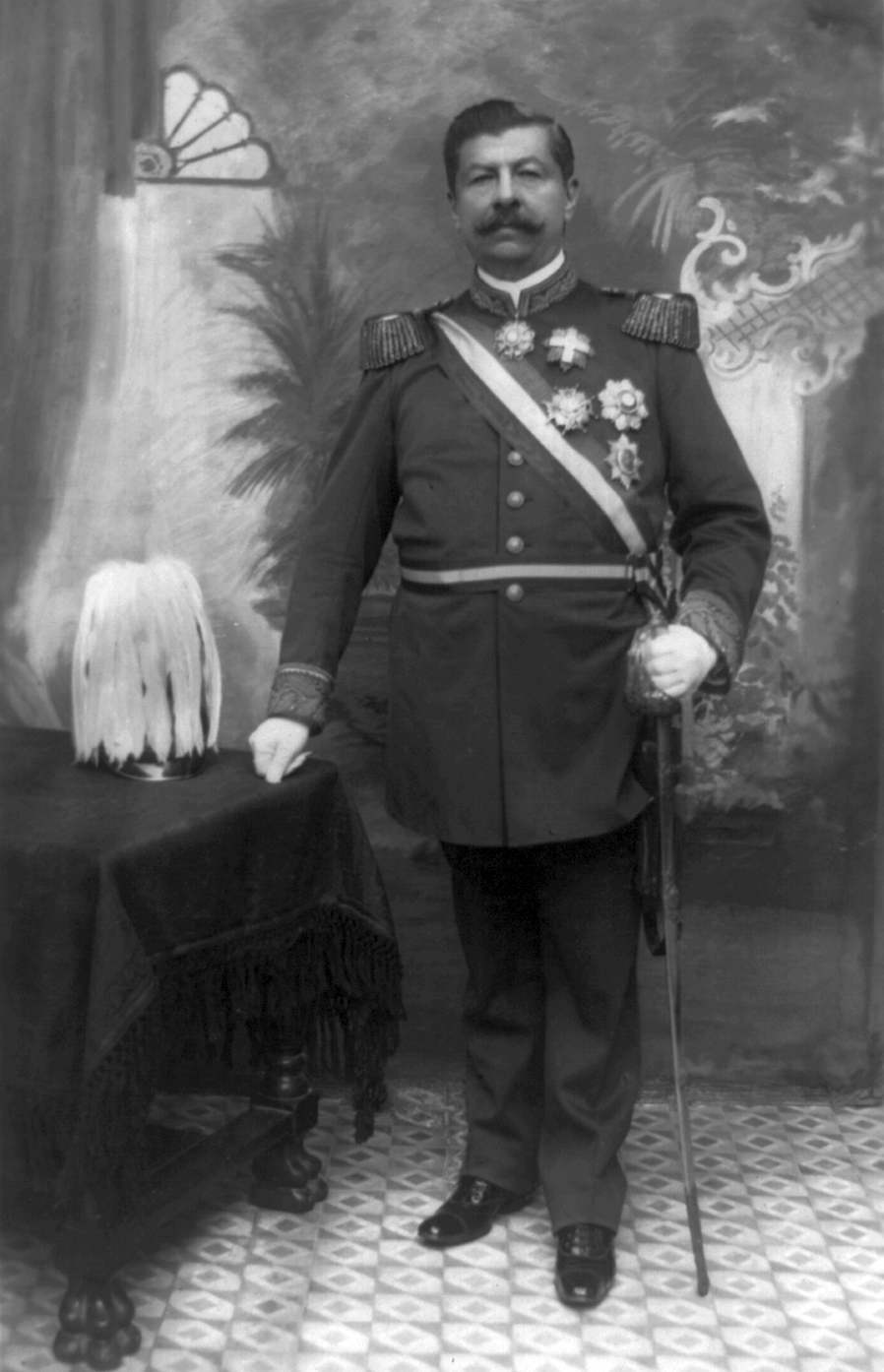
Juan Vicente Gómez, Venezuela

== Caudillos of former sovereign states ==
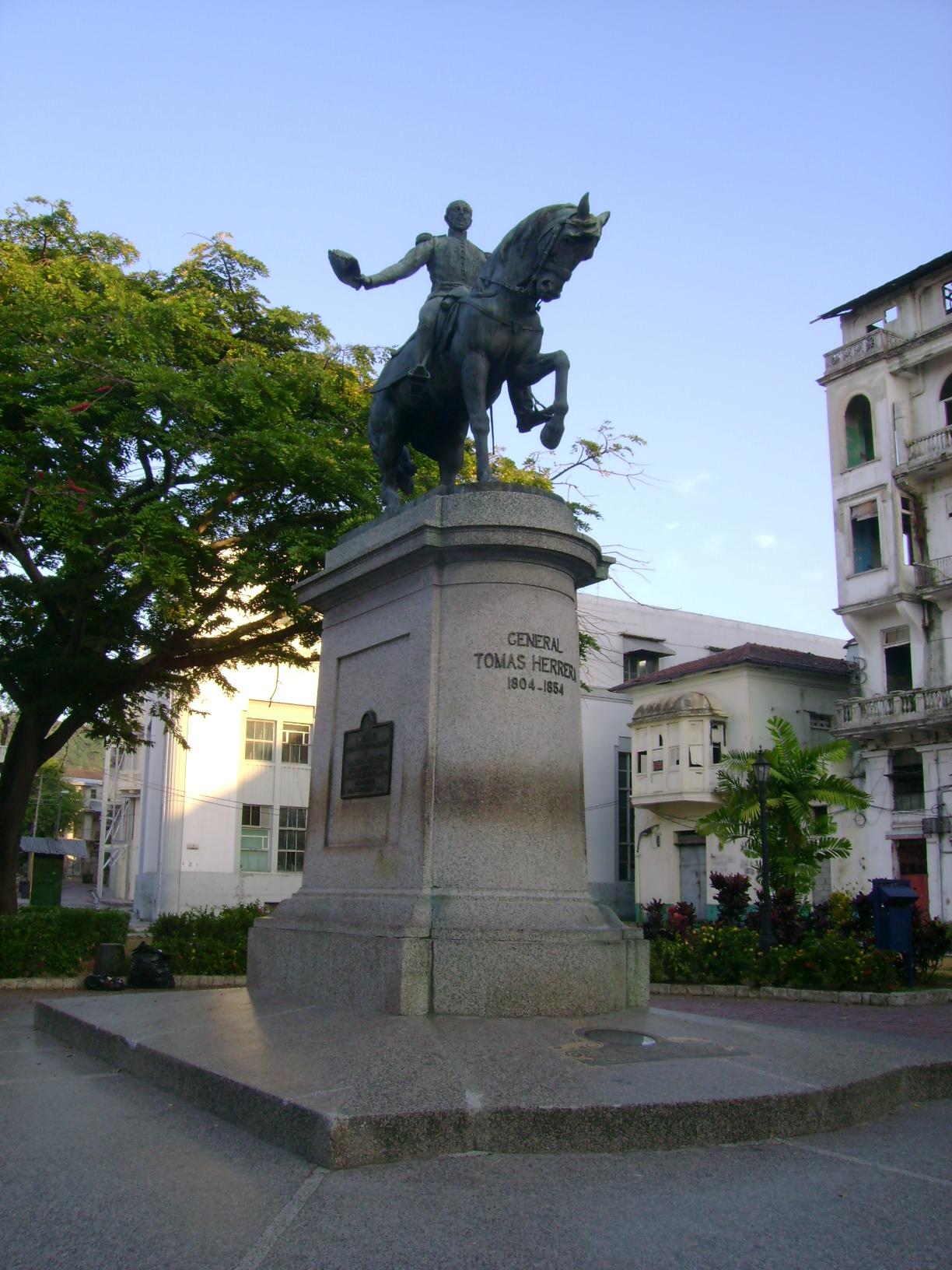
An equestrian statue of Tomás de Herrera

=== Gallery ===
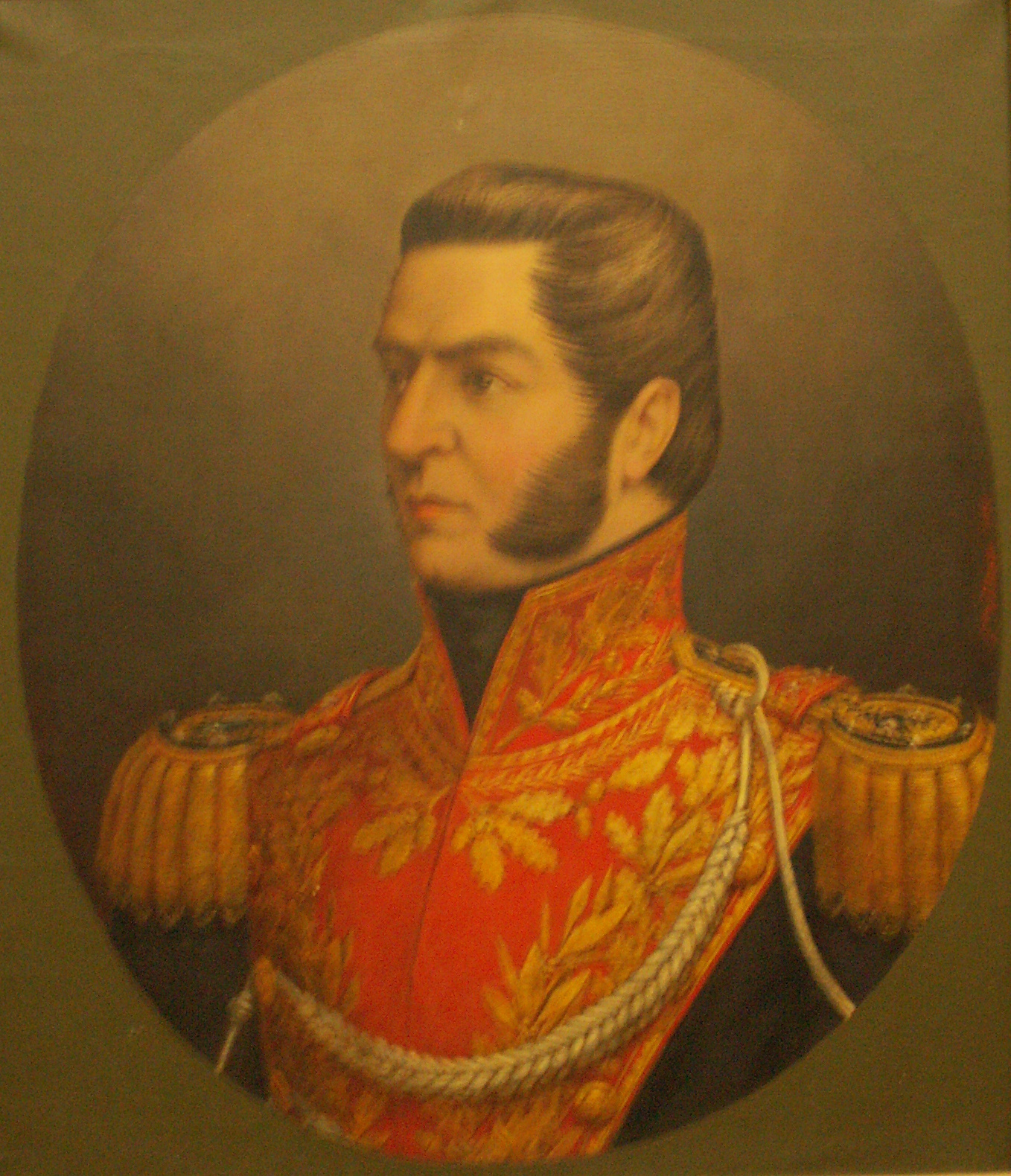
Francisco Ramírez, Entre Ríos

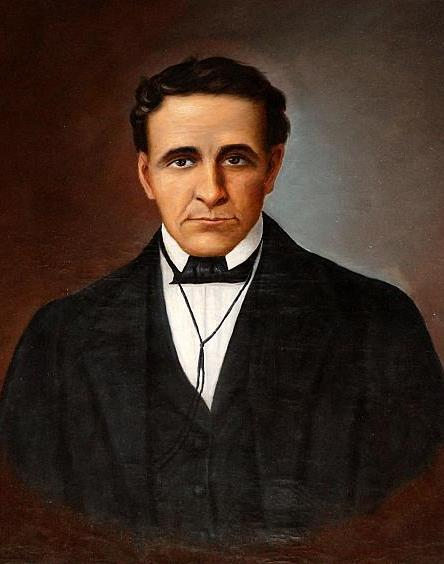
José Joaquín de Olmedo, Guayaquil

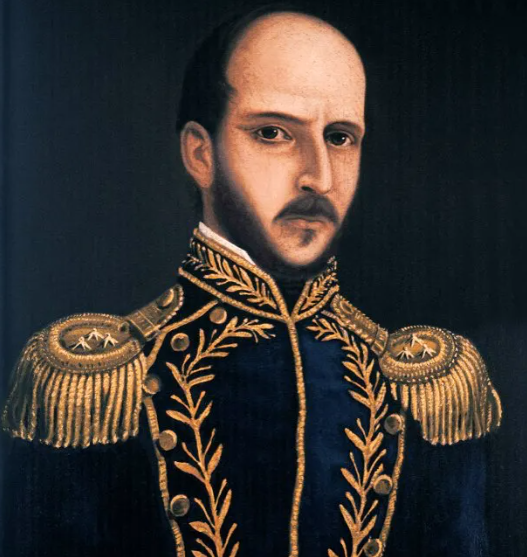
Tomás de Herrera, Isthmus of Panama

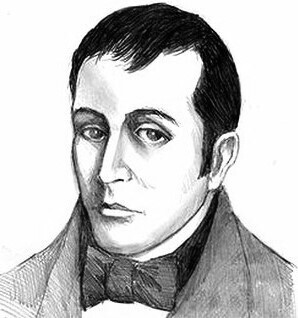
José Núñez de Cáceres, Spanish Haiti

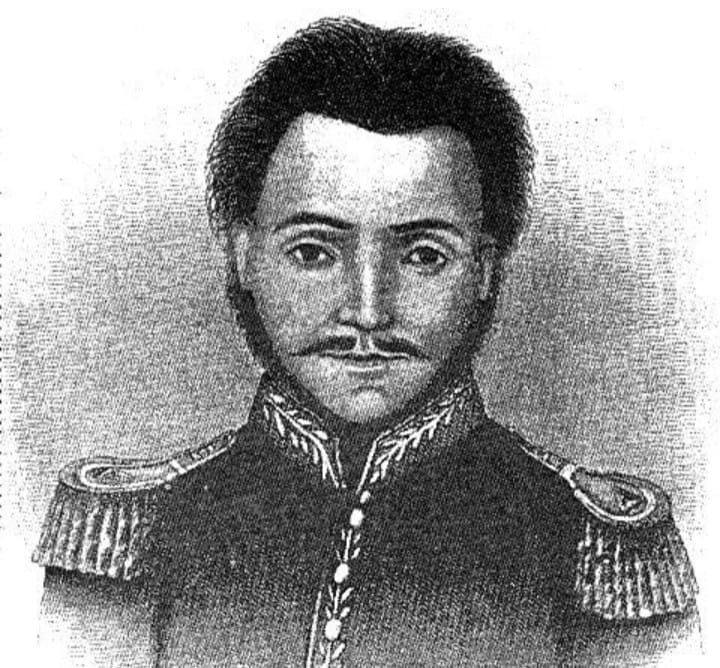
Agustín Guzmán, Los Altos

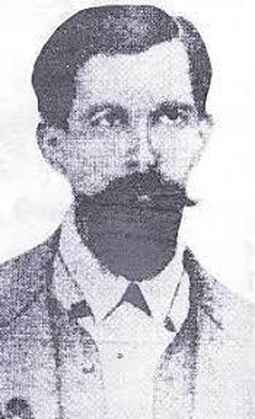
Manuel Rojas Luzardo, Puerto Rico

== Caudillos in literature ==
Fictional Hispanic American caudillos, sometimes based on real historical figures, are important in literature. Colombian Nobel Prize winner Gabriel García Márquez published two works with strongmen as main characters: The Autumn of the Patriarch and The General in his Labyrinth, the latter a controversial novel about Simón Bolívar. In 1946, Nobel Prize laureate Miguel Ángel Asturias published El Señor Presidente, based on the life of Manuel Estrada Cabrera (1898–1920), which was translated to English in 1975.

In 1974, Augusto Roa Bastos published I, the Supreme based on Francia's life. In Mexico, two fictional caudillos are depicted by Mariano Azuela's 1916 novel The Underdogs and Carlos Fuentes's novel The Death of Artemio Cruz. In 1929, Mexican writer Martín Luis Guzmán published his novel La sombra del caudillo, a powerful critic of such strongmen. An outlier in terms of subject matter is Rómulo Gallegos's Doña Bárbara, depicting a woman caudillo.

== See also ==
- List of Hispanic American caudillos
- Caciquismo and Caudillismo
- Caesarism
- Conducător
- Duce
- Fuhrer
- Shogun
- Cult of personality
- Great man theory
- Leaderism
- Personalismo

== Cited sources ==
- Hamil, Hugh M., ed. (1992). Caudillos: Dictators in Spanish America. University of Oklahoma Press. ISBN 0806124288.
- Henderson, James D. (2000). "Caudillos and Conflict, 1826–1870". A Reference Guide to Latin American History. M. E. Sharpe. ISBN 1563247445.
- Lynch, John (1992). Caudillos in Spanish America, 1800–1850. Oxford: Clarendon Press. ISBN 019821135X.
