= Continuismo =

Presidential practice to ignore term limits and continue to rule beyond legal term

Continuismo (English: Continuism) is the practice by incumbents of keeping themselves in office beyond legal term limits for their elected office, often a result or cause of democratic backsliding and the erosion of human rights.

Some Latin American heads of state indefinitely extend their rule by way of reducing or abolishing term limits, via constitutional revision. An example is Alfredo Stroessner in Paraguay. Another tactic is legislative enactment, such as with Jorge Ubico, in Guatemala in 1941. A third tactic is by plebiscite, such as in the cases of Carlos Castillo Armas in Guatemala, Marcos Pérez Jiménez in Venezuela, the 1988 failed attempt by Augusto Pinochet in Chile and Vladimir Putin in 2020 in Russia. A further type is through a self-coup, as done by Getúlio Vargas in Brazil. Yet another way is for the outgoing incumbent to hand-pick a successor that they can use as a puppet ruler, as when Emilio Portes Gil and Abelardo Rodríguez in Mexico allowed Plutarco Elías Calles, "el jefe máximo", to continue ruling, a period known as the Maximato.

The extension of family rule occurred in Nicaragua with the Somoza family; in Argentina with Juan Perón; and then more recently with Néstor Kirchner and his wife Cristina Fernández de Kirchner; and in Cuba with Fidel Castro and his brother Raúl Castro. Despite Peru's one-term limit established by its 1979 constitution, Alberto Fujimori illegally extended his rule to ten years through two re-elections.

U.S. President Donald Trump often mused about serving in office beyond constitutional limits, before publicly ruling it out in September 2023.

== See also ==
- Caudillo
