= Gregory A. Fronius =

United States Army Special Forces sergeant

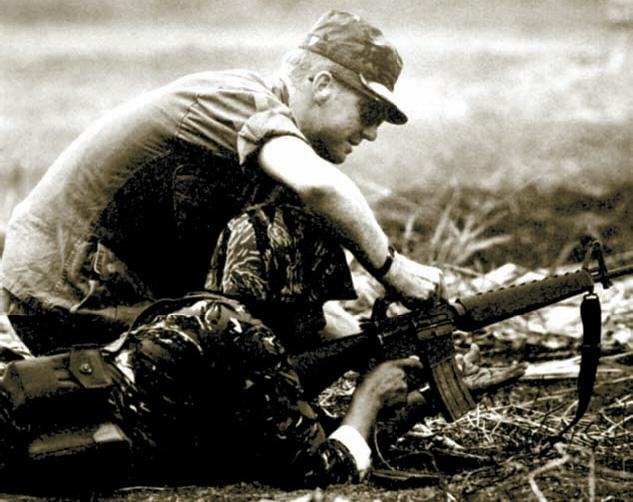
- Fronius training a Salvadoran soldier in marksmanship
- Born: Gregory Allen Fronius; November 3, 1959; Painesville, Ohio, U.S.
- Died: March 31, 1987 (aged 27); El Paraíso, El Salvador
- Cause of death: Killed in action
- Burial place: Greensburg, Pennsylvania, U.S.
- Military career
- Allegiance: United States
- Branch: United States Army
- Service years: 1976–1987
- Rank: Staff sergeant Sergeant first class (posthumous)
- Unit: 7th Special Forces Group (A)
- Conflicts: Salvadoran Civil War; 1987 El Paraíso raid †
- Awards: Silver Star (posthumous)

Gregory Allen Fronius (November 3, 1959 – March 31, 1987) was a United States Army Special Forces sergeant of the 7th Special Forces Group (A). He was a military advisor to the Salvadoran Army during the Salvadoran Civil War in 1987. Fronius was killed in action during a raid of a Salvadoran garrison by the rebel Farabundo Martí National Liberation Front (FMLN). He was posthumously awarded the Silver Star.

== Early life ==
Gregory Allen Fronius was born on November 3, 1959 in Painesville, Ohio. He later lived in Greensburg, Pennsylvania. In Fronius' youth, he watched war films. Fronius attended junior high in Connellsville, Pennsylvania and began high school in Painesville in 1976.

== Military career ==
Fronius joined the United States Army in 1976 as an intelligence specialist. As Fronius spoke Spanish, he was stationed in the Panama Canal Zone. In 1983, Fronius completed the Special Forces Qualification Course, graduated as a engineer sergeant, and was assigned to the 2nd Battalion, 7th Special Forces Group (A). In 1985, he was reassigned to the 3rd Battalion, 7th Special Forces Group (A).

In January 1987, Fronius was sent to El Salvador as an intelligence sergeant of the Military Advisory Group. There, he trained Salvadoran snipers.

== Death ==
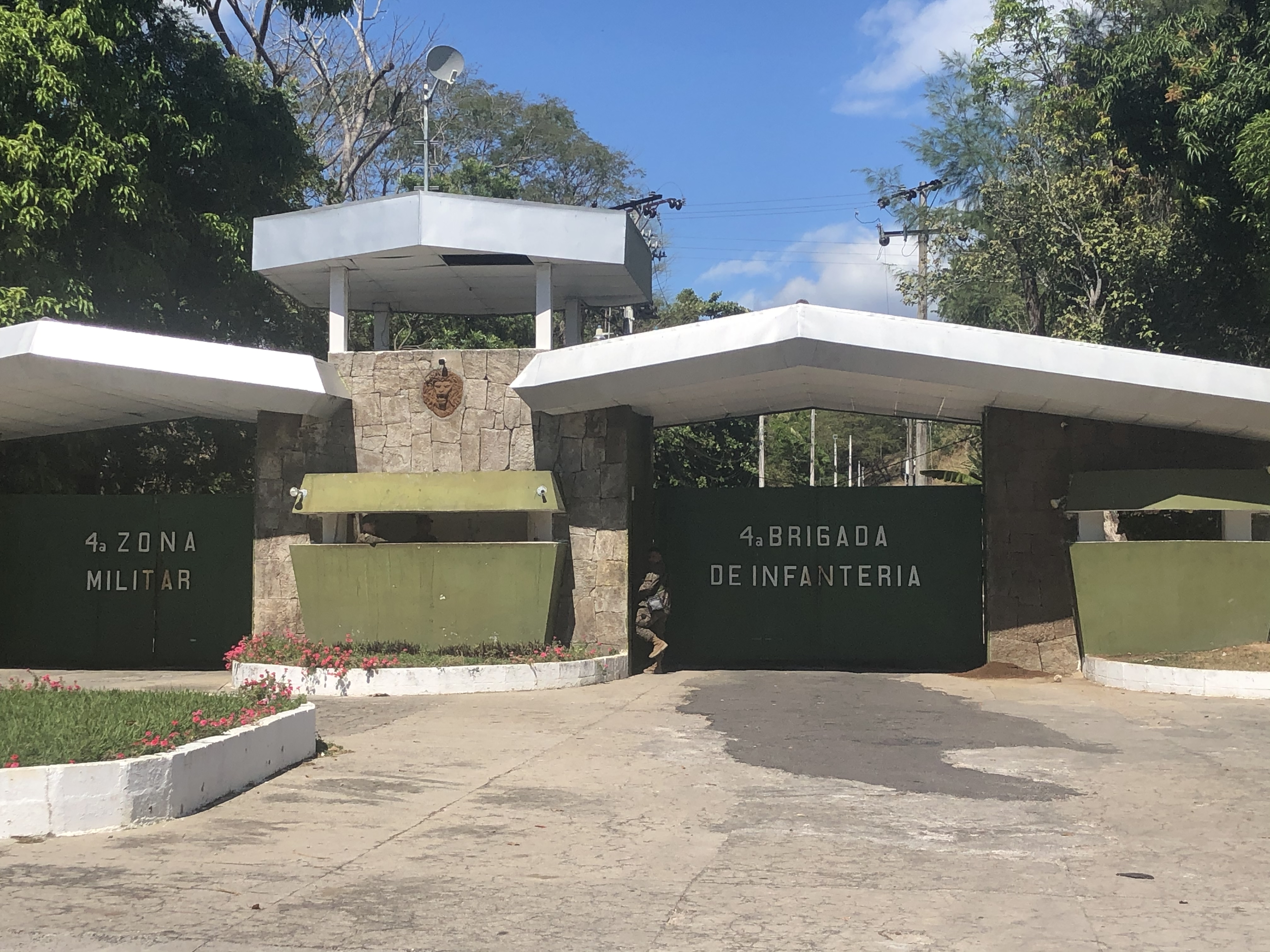
The 4th Infantry Brigade barracks where Fronius was killed in action in 1987

On March 31, 1987, at 2 a.m. CST, Fronius organized a counterattack to a raid by pro-Cuban elements of the rebel Farabundo Martí National Liberation Front (FMLN) on the 4th Infantry Brigade's barracks in El Paraíso, El Salvador. Fronius was shot several times by FMLN snipers and was killed by a mortar shell while attempting to reach a position with an M60 machine gun. In addition to Fronius, the raid killed 64 Salvadoran Army personnel and wounded 79 more, including brigade commander Colonel Gilberto Rubio. Initial reports of Fronius' death stated that he was killed by a mortar shell while sleeping. Fronius' body was transported to Howard Air Force Base in the Panama Canal Zone then returned to his family in Scottdale, Pennsylvania the following week. He was buried in Union Cemetery in Greensburg, Pennsylvania

Pendleton Agnew, a spokesman for the United States embassy to El Salvador, stated that Fronius' presence at the 4th Infantry Brigade's barracks did not violate guidelines prohibiting U.S. soldiers from participating in combat. He explained that barracks was "carefully selected" by the embassy, believing that advisors would be unlikely to encounter combat there. At the time of Fronius' death, he was one of 55 U.S. military personnel in El Salvador. Fronius was the first U.S. soldier to be killed in action in El Salvador. He was also the sixth U.S. soldier to be killed by rebels in El Salvador overall after they assassinated Lieutenant Commander Albert Schaufelberger in 1983 and killed four members of the United States Marine Corps in the 1985 Zona Rosa attacks.

=== Responsibility for Fronius' death ===
Fronius was the only American at the 4th Infantry Brigade at the time when usually two or three were present. This was because, the day before the attack, Lucius Taylor was recalled from the barracks when the United States Military Groups informed him that his wife was going into labor. The Armed Forces of El Salvador suspected that the FMLN received support from within the barracks as, reportedly, some of the explosions that occurred could have only been detonated from within the barracks and because the attack on the command post was "too exact".

In September 2001, the Federal Bureau of Investigation (FBI) arrested Ana Montes, a suspected Cuban spy within the Defense Intelligence Agency (DIA). After a further investigation, DIA agent Scott Carmichael identified Montes as being responsible for Fronius' death. Montes had visited the barracks a few weeks prior to the attack and forwarded information about the barracks to Cuban intelligence officers who then passed it on to the FMLN. Montes pleaded guilty to espionage in 2002 and was sentenced to 25 years imprisonment; she was released in 2023. Carmichael wrote the book "True Believer" regarding his investigation and the Naval Institute Press, the book's publisher, donated funds from the book's sales to Fronius' family.

== Personal life ==
Fronius had a wife, Celinda, and two children, Gregory and Francine, who lived in the Panama Canal Zone. In 1997, the language lab at Fort Bragg was named after Fronius.

== Military awards ==
In 1998, Fronius was posthumously promoted from staff sergeant to sergeant first class and awarded the Silver Star after the army had previously denied issuing him the award. Fronius received the following military awards:

Combat Infantryman Badge
Silver Star	Purple Heart	Armed Forces Expeditionary Medal
Army NCO Professional Development Ribbon with award numeral 2	Army Service Ribbon	Army Overseas Service Ribbon
Master Parachutist Badge		Special Forces DIU
