= Rafael Melara Rivera =

Salvadorian military leader

Rafael Melara Rivera is a military officer in the Armed Forces of El Salvador. He has served as the Deputy Commander of the Cuscatlán Battalion during its deployment to Iraq. He is the first Salvadoran officer to be inducted into the U.S. Army War College International Fellows Hall of Fame.

== Education ==
Melara began his military career in 1981 when he joined the Captain General Gerardo Barrios Military School. He graduated in 1983 as a second lieutenant in field artillery. In 2007, Melara attended the U.S. Army War College, where he completed a program designed to train military leaders from around the world.

== Career ==
In 2005, Melara was deployed to Iraq as the Deputy Commander of the 5th rotation of the Cuscatlán Battalion, a Salvadoran military contingent that participated in coalition efforts to stabilize the region. His leadership during this period earned him recognition from multinational commanders.

Melara has also been recognized for his efforts in combating organized crime, particularly in Central America. His leadership in multinational operations aimed at curbing transnational crime has been noted in various publications.

In 2014, he became the first Salvadoran officer to be inducted into the U.S. Army War College International Fellows Hall of Fame.
