= Chief of the Joint Staff (El Salvador) =

Military title

- Jefe del Estado Mayor Conjunto (Spanish)
- Incumbent; Vice Admiral Exón Oswaldo Ascencio Albeño since 7 May 2023
- Joint Staff
- Reports to: President of El Salvador; Minister of National Defense
- Seat: San Salvador
- Appointer: President of El Salvador

The Chief of the Joint Staff of the Armed Forces of El Salvador (Spanish: Jefe del Estado Mayor Conjunto de la Fuerza Armada) is the highest-ranking professional officer within the Armed Forces of El Salvador. The Chief of the Joint Staff is the principal military advisor to the President of El Salvador and the Minister of National Defense.

== List of officeholders ==
Portrait	Name (Birth–Death)	Term of office			Branch	Ref.
Portrait	Name (Birth–Death)	Took office	Left office	Time in office	Branch	Ref.
	Divisional General; César Adonay Acosta Bonilla	30 January 2012	1 August 2013	1 year, 183 days	Salvadoran Army	
	Divisional General; Rafael Melara Rivera	1 August 2013	14 January 2016	2 years, 166 days	Salvadoran Army	
	Divisional General; Félix Núñez	14 January 2016	1 May 2019	3 years, 107 days	Salvadoran Army	
	Divisional General; Alirio García Flamenco (born c. 1964)	1 May 2019	7 June 2019	67 days	Salvadoran Army	
	Divisional General; Carlos Alberto Tejada Murcia	13 June 2019	7 May 2023	3 years, 298 days	Salvadoran Army	
	Vice Admiral; Exón Oswaldo Ascencio Albeño	7 May 2023	Incumbent	3 years, 136 days	Navy of El Salvador	

== See also ==
- Armed Forces of El Salvador
