= Central American Defense Council =

Former military alliance of right-wing governments

- Consejo de Defensa Centroamericana
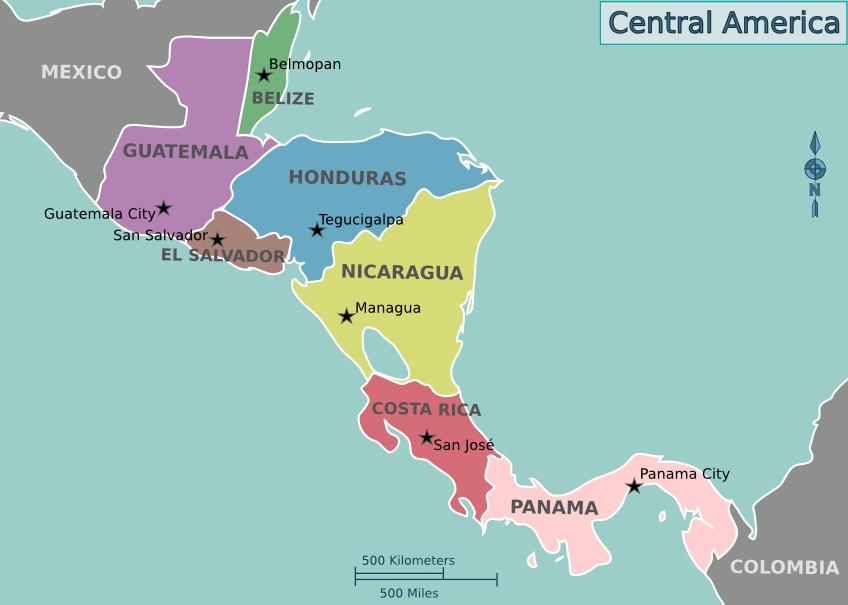
- The seven countries of Central America and their capitals
- Abbreviation: CONDECA
- Established: 14 December 1963; 62 years ago
- Dissolved: 13 December 1991; 34 years ago
- Type: Military alliance
- Members: Costa Rica; El Salvador; Guatemala; Honduras; Nicaragua; Panama
- Parent organization: Organization of Central American States

The Central American Defense Council (Spanish: Consejo de Defensa Centroamericana or CONDECA) was an alliance of Central American countries (Costa Rica, El Salvador, Guatemala, Honduras, Nicaragua, and Panama) and part of the Organization of Central American States. It was created by a treaty signed on 14 December 1963, in Guatemala City. Closely linked to SOUTHCOM, for the common purpose of quelling the various left-wing guerrilla movements that threatened stability in the region during the Cold War. Costa Rica, which had no standing armed forces, participated as a member. It is now defunct.

CONDECA also developed rank insignia used by Bolivia, El Salvador and Honduras.
