= Military ranks of Honduras =

The Military ranks of Honduras are the military insignia used by the Armed Forces of Honduras.

== Commissioned officer ranks ==
The rank insignia of commissioned officers.

Rank group	General / flag officers		Senior officers			Junior officers
Honduran Army
Honduran Army	General de división	General de brigada	Coronel	Teniente coronel	Mayor	Capitán	Teniente	Subteniente
Honduran Navy
Honduran Navy	Vicealmirante	Contralmirante	Capitán de navío	Capitán de fragata	Capitán de corbeta	Teniente de navío	Teniente de fragata	Alferez de fragata
Honduran Air Force
Honduran Air Force	General de división	General de brigada	Coronel	Teniente coronel	Mayor	Capitán	Teniente	Subteniente
Rank group	General / flag officers		Senior officers			Junior officers

== Other ranks ==
The rank insignia of non-commissioned officers and enlisted personnel.

Rank group	Senior NCOs				Junior NCOs	Enlisted
Honduran Army
Honduran Army	Sargento mayor	Sargento primero	Sargento segundo	Sargento raso	Cabo		Soldado
Honduran Navy							No insignia
Honduran Navy		Contramaestre I	Contramaestre II	Contramaestre III	Cabo de cubierta		Marino de cubierta
Honduran Air Force
Honduran Air Force	Sargento mayor técnico	Sargento primero técnico	Sargento segundo técnico		Cabo técnico	Aero técnico primera clase	Aero técnico básico
Rank group	Senior NCOs				Junior NCOs	Enlisted

== Historic ranks ==
Prior to the adoption of the current rank structure, Honduras used insignia based on the design guidelines of the Central American Defense Council.
