= Ana Montes =

American intelligence analyst and spy (born 1957)

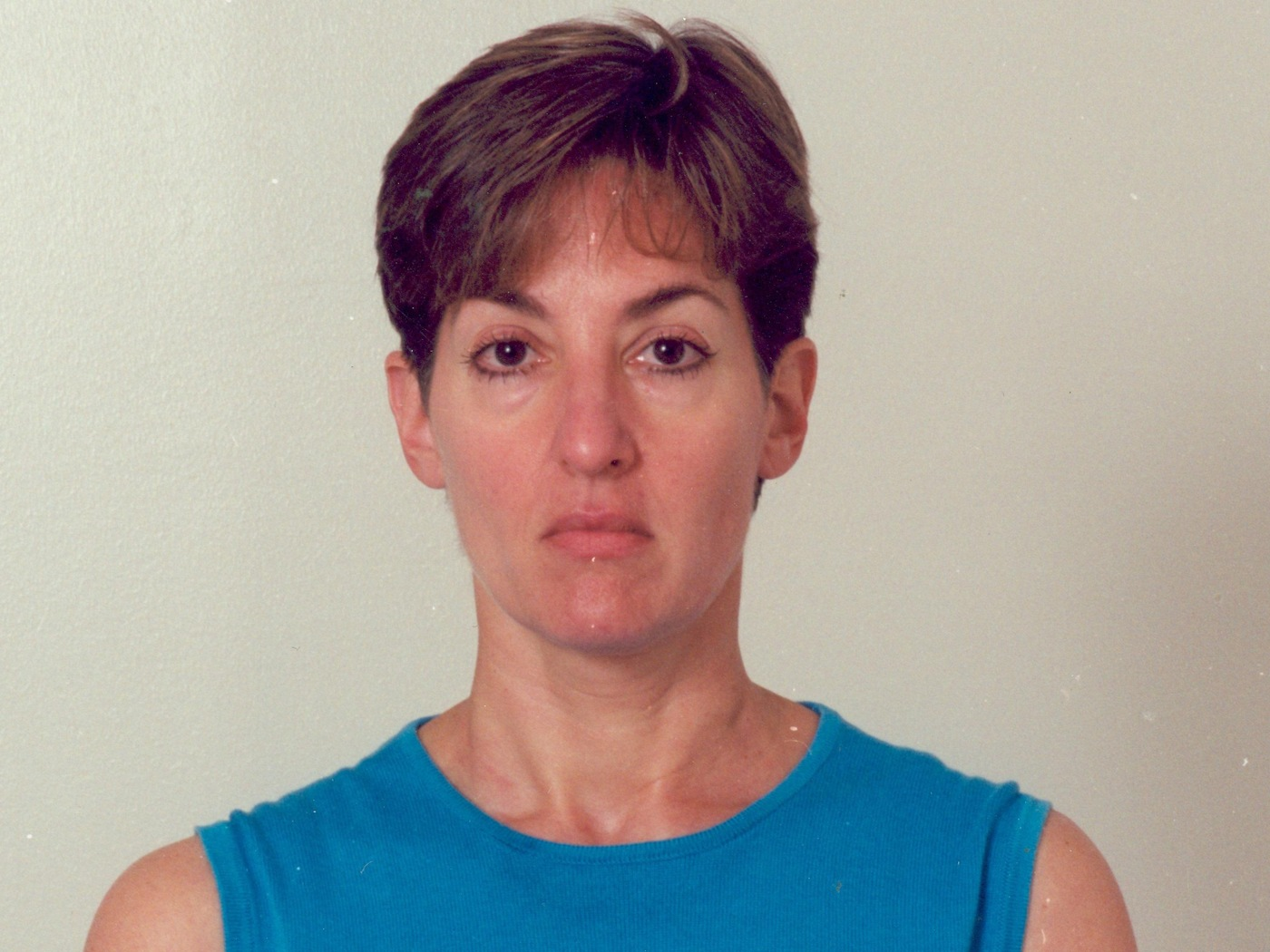
- Montes's mug shot in September 2001
- Born: Ana Belén Montes; February 28, 1957 (age 69); Nuremberg, West Germany
- Education: University of Virginia; Johns Hopkins University
- Occupation: Intelligence Analyst
- Status: Released
- Conviction: Conspiracy to commit espionage (18 U.S.C. § 794)
- Penalty: 25 years imprisonment

Details
- Imprisoned at: FMC Carswell

Ana Belén Montes (born February 28, 1957) is an American former senior analyst at the United States Defense Intelligence Agency who spied on behalf of the Cuban government for 17 years.

Montes was arrested on September 21, 2001, and she subsequently was charged with conspiracy to commit espionage for the government of Cuba. Montes pleaded guilty to spying and, in October 2002, was sentenced to a 25-year prison term to be followed by five-years' probation. She was released on January 6, 2023, after having served 20 years behind bars.

== Early life ==
Montes's family originated from the Asturian region of Spain, and her grandparents immigrated to Puerto Rico. She was born on February 28, 1957, at the U.S. Army Hospital in Nuremberg, West Germany, where her father, Alberto Montes, was posted as a U.S. Army doctor. Sixteen months later, her younger sister Luz, nicknamed Lucy, was born at the same Army hospital. The family moved to the United States on August 26, 1958, following the completion of Alberto's three-year posting, and by the fall of that year, they were living in Topeka, Kansas, where Montes's younger brother Alberto, nicknamed Tito, was born in June 1959. In 1967, the family relocated to Towson, Maryland, where Montes graduated from Loch Raven High School in 1975. The Montes children reportedly experienced physical and emotional abuse from their father throughout their upbringing.

In 1975, Montes enrolled at the University of Virginia in Charlottesville, where she initially majored in history. Two years later, she changed her major to foreign affairs and spent her junior year studying abroad in Spain through the Institute of European Studies. During her time in Spain in 1977, she met Ricardo Fernandez Eiriz, a leftist from Argentina, with whom she began a relationship. Eiriz spoke with Montes about U.S. support for authoritarian governments, conversations that played a major role in shaping her political outlook.

During her year in Spain, as the country transitioned to democracy following the death of dictator Francisco Franco, Montes participated in street rallies with friends amid widespread anti-U.S. sentiment over American support for Franco. She wrote letters to her sister Lucy expressing a growing interest in Cuba and began identifying as a leftist. Although her relationship with Eiriz ended after her time abroad, a later report by the Department of Defense Office of Inspector General stated that she had become "attracted to the social Communist parties in Europe during her junior academic year in Spain in 1978."

== Career and espionage ==
=== DOJ career and first espionage activities (1979–1985) ===
Montes graduated in 1979 and moved to Puerto Rico, where she worked as a receptionist at a law firm before taking a temporary position at the Universidad del Sagrado Corazón in San Juan. In December 1979, she relocated to Washington, D.C., after learning of a job opening as a clerk-typist with the United States Department of Justice (DOJ) in its Office of Privacy and Information Appeals. This position marked the beginning of her twenty-two–year career in the U.S. government. The Federal Bureau of Investigation (FBI) conducted a routine background check on Montes but did not uncover her increasing disillusionment with the U.S. government. She quickly gained a strong reputation at the Justice Department and, after three years, was promoted to paralegal.

In 1982, while working at the Justice Department, Montes began a two-year master's program at Johns Hopkins University's School of Advanced International Studies (SAIS), concentrating in Latin American studies, where she connected with other leftists who shared her increasingly radical views. During her time at SAIS, she met fellow graduate student Marta Velázquez, who was described by acquaintances as politically leftist. Velázquez had studied political science and Latin American studies at Princeton University beginning in 1975, during which she traveled to Cuba to conduct field research for her senior thesis. She later earned a Juris Doctor degree from Georgetown University Law Center before enrolling at SAIS in the fall of 1982. According to the U.S. Justice Department, Velázquez became a Cuban agent in 1983 after traveling from Washington to Mexico City “to clandestinely meet with Cuban Intelligence Service officers and/or agents.” It is unclear how Cuban intelligence first established contact with her, though it is believed she may have been approached during her undergraduate trip to Cuba.

According to a grand jury indictment unsealed in 2013, the Justice Department stated that Velázquez assisted Cuban intelligence “in spotting, assessing, and recruiting United States citizens who occupied sensitive national security positions or had the potential of occupying such positions in the future—including Ana Belén Montes—to serve as agents of the Cuban intelligence service.” By 1984, Montes and Velázquez were closely associated and participated in the same SAIS graduation ceremony. Although Montes took part in the ceremony, she was handed an empty diploma because she still owed $2,300 in tuition, which she refused to pay, claiming the school had treated her unfairly and reneged on some financial aid. Later that year, on December 16, Montes attended a dinner in Manhattan with Velázquez and a Cuban intelligence officer. Defense Department investigators later reported that the twenty-seven-year-old Montes “unhesitatingly agreed to work through the Cubans to ‘help’ Nicaragua,” having already expressed moral opposition to U.S. policy in Nicaragua to Velázquez and others in class.

Within weeks of agreeing to work with Cuban intelligence, Montes’s sister Lucy began a position as a language specialist with the FBI in January 1985—a development that reportedly angered Montes. On March 29, 1985, Montes and Velázquez traveled to Madrid for what appeared to be a routine spring break trip. Although they flew to Spain under their own names, they met a Cuban agent upon arrival who supplied them with false passports. From there, they flew to Prague to obscure their movements before continuing on to Cuba, where two operatives were waiting. In Cuba, Montes and Velázquez received training in espionage from Cuban agents who had themselves been instructed by the Soviets. They were taught to communicate covertly with handlers through encrypted high-frequency shortwave radio messages transmitted from Havana, to detect surveillance, and to evade pursuers. Both requested practice polygraph examinations to prepare for security screenings when seeking classified positions within U.S. government agencies. After nearly two weeks of training, they returned to the United States, retracing their route from Havana through Prague to Madrid.

Montes sought positions that would provide access to classified information, particularly concerning the civil war in Nicaragua. She applied to the Office of Naval Intelligence and the Arms Control and Disarmament Agency before, in June 1985, submitting an application to the Defense Intelligence Agency (DIA), listing Velázquez as a character reference. According to later reports, Cuban intelligence encouraged her to apply to the DIA and assisted in preparing her application. Montes began working as an entry-level analyst at the DIA on September 30, 1985. Before Montes’s appointment at the DIA, a former colleague from the Justice Department contacted FBI background investigators and “suggested that Montes was disloyal to the United States” because of her outspoken criticism of U.S. policy in Nicaragua. She was not administered a polygraph examination during the hiring process, as the DIA was experiencing a surge in recruitment and sought to fill positions quickly.

=== DIA career and further espionage activities (1986–1996) ===
Montes became the DIA’s principal analyst for El Salvador and later for Nicaragua. Her supervisors requested that she be granted Sensitive Compartmented Information (SCI) clearance, a level higher than “top secret,” which provided access to some of the Department of Defense’s most closely guarded information. During her first three months at the DIA, Montes met with her handlers at restaurants in New York City. She later shifted to meetings at Chinese restaurants in Washington, D.C., near Metrorail stations, typically every two to three weeks on weekends.

To minimize the risk of detection, Montes limited the number of documents she removed from DIA facilities. She once provided her handlers with a DIA phone directory and, on occasion, classified photographs or memoranda. Aware that DIA security conducted random bag searches, she increasingly relied on memorization: rather than taking documents offsite, as spies like Robert Hanssen did—who left thousands of classified documents for the Russians at dead drop locations—she committed sensitive information to memory and relayed it to her handlers to avoid creating a paper trail.

During her first few years at the DIA, Montes received consistent praise from her supervisors and, by the late 1980s, had gained widespread recognition. She produced top-secret reports that were commended by policymakers, military departments, and members of the Intelligence Community. In early 1987, Montes embarked on her first DIA-authorized trip abroad, spending one week in Guatemala and five weeks in El Salvador as part of analyst orientation. During the trip, she visited the El Paraíso military base and received detailed briefings on its security and operations—just weeks before the leftist Farabundo Martí National Liberation Front (FMLN) guerrillas launched a devastating attack on the base, killing 43 Salvadoran soldiers and U.S. Green Beret Staff Sergeant Gregory A. Fronius. Military experts have long speculated that the FMLN benefited from insider assistance.

Montes’s sister, Lucy, married Chris Mangiaracina, who managed the auto fleet at the FBI’s Miami Field Office and was preparing to join the Bureau as a white-collar financial crime investigator. In late 1987, Montes’s brother, Tito, and his wife, Joan, applied for and were offered positions as clerks at the Miami Field Office, and later went on to become special agents. Within a few years of beginning her espionage for Cuba, Montes had four close relatives working for the FBI.

Montes and Velázquez remained close until 1988, when Velázquez “provoked a dispute” and publicly ended their friendship. According to the Department of Justice, the staged breakup was intended to obscure their connection as they advanced in their respective government careers. In 1990, the DIA reassigned Montes to work full-time as a long-term Nicaragua analyst. Shortly after her reassignment, the Nicaraguan civil war ended. The DIA sent Montes to meet the newly elected Nicaraguan President Violeta Chamorro and provide briefings on Nicaragua’s military capabilities, which she delivered twice. For her assistance, Montes was nominated for the DIA Meritorious Civilian Service Award, which she received in a formal ceremony later that year.

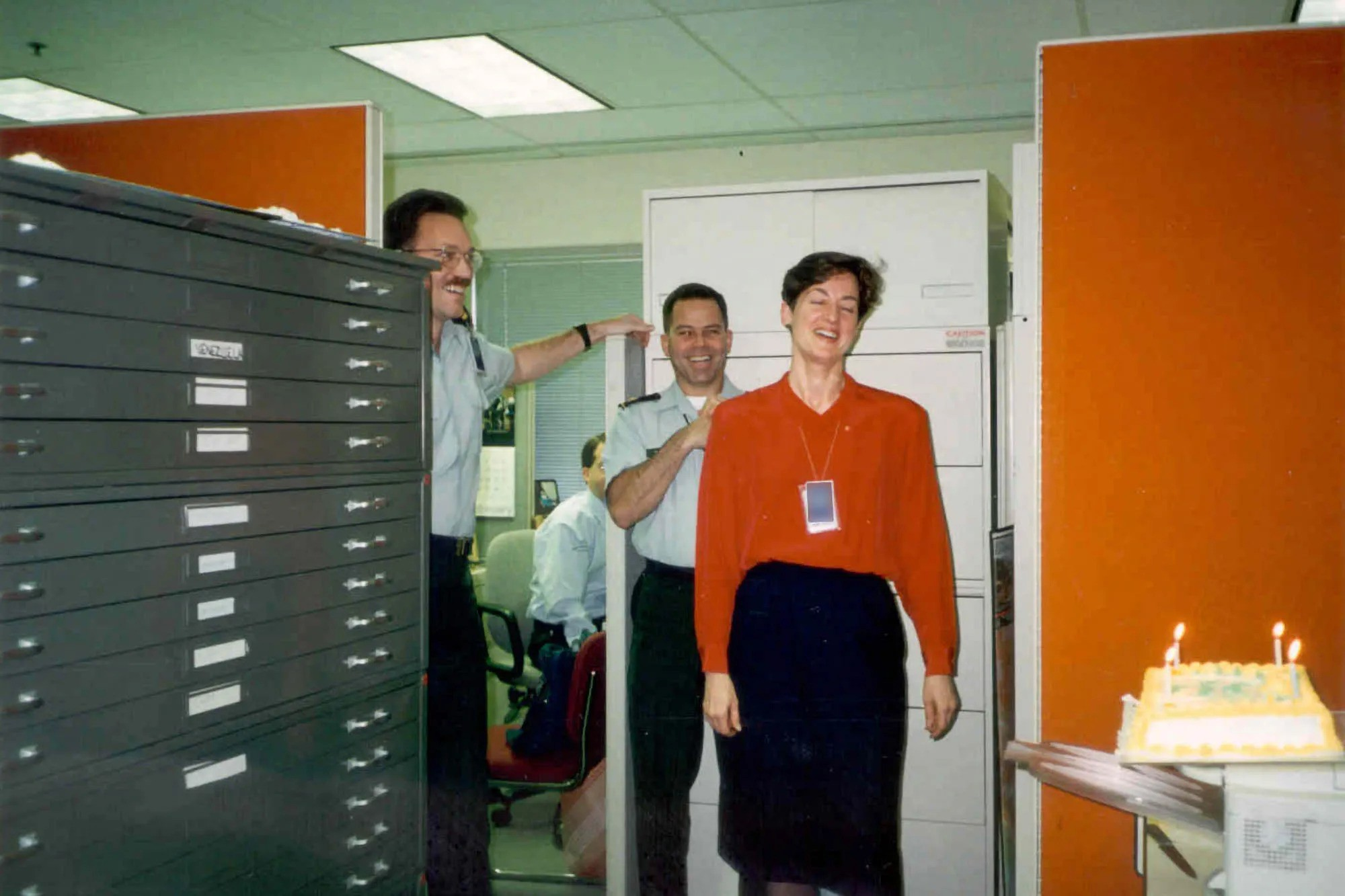
Montes with DIA colleagues during a surprise birthday celebration

In February 1993, Montes was selected to oversee the DIA’s Cuba account and became a long-term Cuba analyst. She deliberately invited herself to any briefings that might concern Cuba, seeking to expand her knowledge, and became the Intelligence Community’s leading expert on the country’s military leadership, weapons systems, and overall capabilities. She earned the nickname the “Queen of Cuba.”

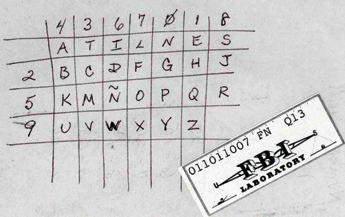
A “cheat sheet” provided by Cuban intelligence that Montes used to help her encrypt and decrypt messages to and from her handlers

That fall, Montes purchased a second-floor co-op at 3039 Macomb Street in the Cleveland Park neighborhood of Washington, D.C. From the privacy of her apartment, she used a Sony ICF-2010 shortwave radio to tune into a pre-established frequency, known as a numbers station, at precisely 9:00 p.m. or 10:00 p.m. on Tuesdays, Thursdays, and Saturdays. A female voice would announce “Atención!” before reciting hundreds of seemingly random numbers. Montes entered the digits into her computer, a Toshiba 405CS, where a Cuban-installed decryption program converted them into Spanish-language text, which contained her tasking instructions from Havana. The coded broadcasts were nearly impossible to break without a unique cryptographic key, and because they were transmitted openly for anyone to hear, it was difficult for intelligence services to determine the intended recipient.

When Montes needed to contact her Cuban handlers, she relied on pay phones to dial pager numbers they controlled, using a system of coded signals. One code signaled “I’m in extreme danger,” while another meant “We have to meet.” To safeguard her communications, Montes recorded pager codes and shortwave-radio notes on water-soluble paper that could be destroyed instantly if necessary.

In March 1994, Montes successfully passed a DIA-administered counterintelligence polygraph examination, designed to detect espionage, sabotage, or unauthorized disclosure of classified information. It was the only polygraph she ever took during her sixteen-plus-year career with the Department of Defense. Just two months later, she provided the Cubans with the true identity of a covert U.S. intelligence officer who was preparing to travel to Cuba in an undercover capacity.

In May 1995, Montes’s sister Lucy was assigned to the Royal Flush Task Force, a top-secret operation run by the FBI, NSA, and Navy to investigate Cuban espionage in Miami. On February 24, 1996, the Cuban Air Force shot down two unarmed aircraft operated by Brothers to the Rescue, an organization opposed to the Cuban government. The following day, Montes was called to the Defense Intelligence Analysis Center (DIAC) to assist in evaluating options. She was quickly assigned to a task force at the Pentagon, arriving around 11:00 a.m., and remained there for the rest of the day.

Customarily, personnel on a Joint Chiefs Task Force are not permitted to leave until officially dismissed. However, citing exhaustion, Montes departed around 8:00 p.m., earlier than the expected 10:00 p.m., after receiving a phone call that left her visibly agitated, according to a coworker’s secondhand account, Pentagon investigators later reported. The source of the call remains unclear, but it reportedly raised suspicion among her colleagues. On the morning of February 26, less than 48 hours after the shootdown, a Cuban handler allegedly broke protocol by waiting for Montes on the street in Cleveland Park and flagged her down as she was about to drive to work for an impromptu briefing, desperate to learn whether the U.S. was planning to launch cruise missiles at Cuba or retaliate in another potentially deadly way.

== Investigation ==
=== First investigation, continued espionage activities ===
In April 1996, Reg Brown, a DIA counterintelligence analyst who had worked with Montes, contacted Scott Carmichael, a DIA counterintelligence officer specializing in mole-hunting, to express concerns about her. Brown reported that Montes had taken a phone call and abruptly left the Pentagon during a major emergency, and that she had been “unusually aggressive” in accessing classified information. He noted that she sometimes inserted herself into meetings involving Cuban counterintelligence matters in which she had no official role. Brown also reported that Montes had expressed opposition to U.S. policy in Cuba and that his Cuban intelligence sources had unexpectedly ceased providing information.

Carmichael listened carefully and then conveyed Brown’s concerns to the FBI’s Washington Field Office, which initially showed little interest, as the evidence was largely circumstantial. Six months later, after Brown reported additional warning signs, the FBI agreed that Carmichael should interview Montes. On November 7, 1996, Carmichael questioned Montes about her possible involvement in a Cuban intelligence influence operation, as well as the Brothers to the Rescue incident. Montes denied receiving any outside phone calls at the Pentagon and attempted to deflect suspicion by suggesting the name of a female Georgetown University professor whom she believed might be spying for Cuba. Carmichael later stated that he could tell Montes “was hiding something,” but lacked sufficient evidence to take action. He briefed his supervisors, who were unconvinced, and by Thanksgiving 1996, with no further leads, Carmichael formally closed the case.

Cleared of suspicion, Montes returned to her work. On May 15, 1997, she was granted access to a highly classified satellite project run by the National Reconnaissance Office (NRO), through which she compromised the Misty satellite program to Cuban intelligence—one of the most costly and significant classified programs in recent U.S. history. Misty was not the only significant program Montes exposed. She had broad access to the “Secure Analyst File Environment” (SAFE), an electronic information-sharing database in which DIA analysts, as well as counterparts from the CIA, NSA, NRO, Department of Defense, and other major intelligence agencies, uploaded articles and raw intelligence reports daily. Montes selectively memorized material of interest and passed it to Cuban intelligence using encrypted diskettes.

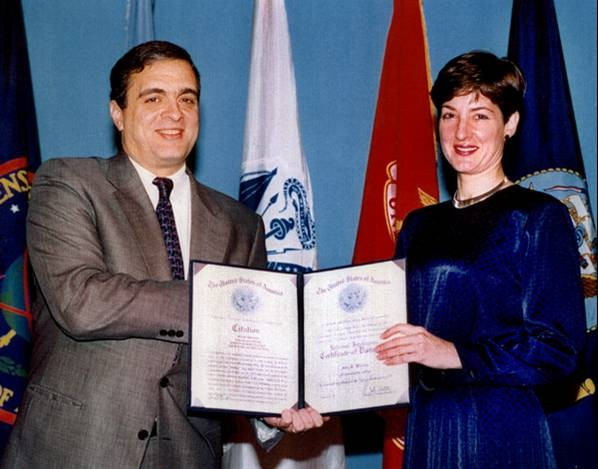
Ana Montes receiving the National Certificate of Distinction from CIA director George Tenet, 1997

In 1997, Montes received the National Intelligence Certificate of Distinction from the Director of Central Intelligence George Tenet. That same year, she disclosed the identities of a third and fourth covert U.S. intelligence officer in Cuba, putting the lives of two CIA assets operating under deep cover at risk. In January 1998, she visited Cuba for the fourth time, working from the U.S. Interests Section in Havana and sneaking off to meet with her superiors at the Dirección de Inteligencia (DGI). Following the trip, she sent a suspicious email to DIA investigator Scott Carmichael, claiming that an unknown Cuban had followed her in Havana. It is believed that Montes sent the email as a cover story in case any Americans had observed her with a handler in the city.

In September 1998, the FBI’s Miami Field Office announced the arrest of the Cuban Five, aided by the Royal Flush Task Force, of which Montes’s sister Lucy was a member. The FBI also recovered the cryptographic keys used to decode numbers broadcasts that Cuban intelligence transmitted via shortwave radio to communicate with their agents. Once the Cubans became aware of this, they suspended operations, and Montes’s handlers abruptly cut off contact with her. From that point forward, she no longer met with handlers inside the United States; all future meetings were conducted overseas. Montes abandoned the use of her Toshiba laptop for decrypting messages and preparing encrypted diskettes, instead relying on memory to verbally relay classified information during in-person meetings with her handlers in the Caribbean.

=== Second investigation ===
Following the arrest of the Cuban Five, the NSA successfully decrypted secret messages using the recovered cryptographic keys and provided the FBI with detailed leads regarding an unidentified subject (UNSUB) suspected of being a senior U.S. official spying for Cuba. In 1989, Elena Valdez, a counterintelligence analyst at the NSA and expert on Cuba and Latin America, briefed the FBI on the UNSUB. The case was assigned to FBI Special Agent Steve McCoy, who had recently joined the Washington Field Office’s Cuban counterintelligence squad.

The tips from the NSA and other U.S. intelligence sources included the following:

1. The unidentified U.S. government official was referred to as “Agent S” by the Cubans and had access to highly classified programs, including the ability to request the true identity of a Cuban “walk-in,” a defector who had recently come to the United States.
2. The official was believed to have visited the U.S. military base at Guantanamo Bay, Cuba, within a two-week period in July 1996.
3. Agent S had purchased a specific Toshiba laptop as directed by Cuban handlers, within a narrow timeframe.
4. The official had access to a device or document involving the term “Safe.”
5. The Cubans had assisted Agent S in paying off a college loan.
6. Agent S met with an important individual whose initials were “WD.”

Based on the leads and historical precedent, McCoy and his unit strongly believed the UNSUB was male, as Americans who committed espionage-related offenses since 1947 had predominantly been men. In shortwave radio communications decrypted by the NSA, the Cubans referred to “Agent S” as male approximately 70% of the time and female 30% of the time. McCoy reviewed hundreds of paper-based Guantanamo Bay travel records to identify individuals who had visited the detention camp in July 1996 and pursued the tip regarding the Toshiba computer, but these efforts were unsuccessful. After two years, the FBI had yet to identify any suspects.

Valdez periodically contacted FBI headquarters to monitor the progress of the case. During one such check-in in early 2000, analyst John Paul Rosario informed her that the case had been closed. This was later regarded as a miscommunication, as Rosario did not oversee the investigation and the case had not actually been closed. Nevertheless, the misunderstanding prompted Valdez to pursue the leads herself. Later that year, she discovered that the DIA maintained a Cuban counterintelligence squad and arranged a meeting with Chris Simmons, a DIA counterintelligence analyst specializing in Cuba, without notifying the NSA or FBI. She shared the leads with Simmons, who confirmed that the device or document involving the word “Safe” referred to the Secure Analyst File Environment (SAFE), the DIA’s classified messaging system. This indicated that the UNSUB was a DIA employee.

As an analyst, Simmons did not have the authority to investigate an espionage case independently, so he contacted Carmichael, who had previously interviewed Montes in 1996. Carmichael focused on the Guantanamo Bay lead and confirmed that Montes had visited the base in July 1996. He reported this information to FBI headquarters, but McCoy noted that Montes did not match the details he had on the UNSUB and the FBI continued to believe the UNSUB was male rather than female. Carmichael continued to investigate Montes internally at the DIA, with assistance from Valdez. According to his typed notes, during his 1996 interview, Montes had boasted about working closely with William Doherty, the chief of the FBI’s counterintelligence section, matching the initials “WD” from the lead. Carmichael shared this information with McCoy, who began to view him as a valuable collaborator, and the two subsequently started working closely on the case together, along with Special Agent Peter J. Lapp.

On October 16, 2000, McCoy opened a preliminary investigation into Montes, which escalated to a full field investigation by November. More than fifty personnel were assigned to the case, and undercover operatives began tailing Montes by car and on foot. They recorded her making suspicious calls from pay phones despite carrying a cell phone in her purse. The FBI also intercepted her mail and conducted inspections of her trash. Soon after the investigation began, Montes was awarded a National Intelligence Fellowship at the CIA under George Tenet, a highly prestigious position that would have granted her access to classified CIA information. In response, the FBI briefed DIA Director Vice Admiral Thomas Wilson, who, along with his team, devised a ruse to impose an agency-wide freeze preventing DIA employees from being loaned to outside agencies.

On February 16, 2001, the Foreign Intelligence Surveillance Court granted the FBI permission to monitor Montes’s emails, listen to her phone calls, and search her apartment, office, car, and Riggs Bank safe-deposit box. The authorization also allowed the FBI to install hidden cameras and microphones in her office and home. In April, Special Agent Lapp used a National Security Letter to examine Montes’s credit records. He discovered that Montes had applied for a line of credit in 1996 at a CompUSA store in Alexandria, Virginia, and purchased the same model of Toshiba laptop referenced in the NSA lead.

On May 25, 2001, Lapp and a small team of FBI black-bag specialists covertly entered Montes’s apartment. In the bedroom, beneath a window, they discovered a Sony ICF-2010 shortwave radio and a Toshiba 405CS laptop hidden under her bed. A copy of the hard drive revealed eleven pages of incriminating documents, including direct communications between Montes and her Cuban handlers. Lapp and his team conducted several additional covert searches of her apartment in the following months.

On the morning of August 16, 2001, investigators staged a fake meeting in which Montes was asked to provide remarks on a Cuba-related issue, creating an opportunity to access her purse. McCoy and another agent, posing as IT staff, lingered near her cubicle under the pretense of resolving a technical problem and searched the purse. Inside they found prepaid calling cards used for pay phone calls, a New York pager number later traced to Cuban intelligence, and a series of digits corresponding to codes Montes used when dialing her handler’s pager.

On September 11, 2001, the United States suffered a series of coordinated terrorist attacks. Montes attributed the attacks to American foreign policy, a view that raised concerns among her family and colleagues. Co-workers noted that her primary preoccupation continued to be Cuba; she asked another analyst whether they thought the United States might retaliate against the Cubans. That weekend, she placed a flurry of phone calls. On September 14, after leaving the DIA and returning home, Montes—still in her work clothes—walked to the National Zoo, where the FBI’s Special Surveillance Group was monitoring her. At the “Prairie Land” overlook, she paused for thirty seconds before moving deeper into the zoo, then abruptly doubled back in a classic countersurveillance maneuver. She removed a piece of paper from her wallet and made two calls from a public pay phone to a pager number, which the FBI had already linked to Cuban intelligence. The following day, she made another call to the same number.

On September 16, Montes made another call from a public pay phone to the same pager number. She initially picked up the receiver and began dialing before hanging up and circling the area. Returning to the phone, she completed the call and entered an encrypted message into the pager that translated to “Danger Perla,” a warning that she believed Cuba was in danger of being attacked by the United States.

== Arrest ==
The DIA played a key role in the launch of Operation Enduring Freedom, assisting in efforts against Al Qaeda and the Taliban regime in Afghanistan. Montes had been scheduled to join a task force for the operation, granting her access to classified information that authorities sought to protect from potential adversaries. On the morning of September 21, 2001, Montes was called to a conference room at the DIA, where she was confronted by FBI agents McCoy and Lapp. The agents conducted an interrogation aimed at obtaining incriminating statements or a confession. During the interrogation, Montes reportedly experienced a rash on her neck twice, which she managed to control. When she inquired whether she was under investigation, she was arrested by McCoy and Lapp on charges of conspiracy to commit espionage.

During a post-arrest search of Montes’s apartment, FBI evidence teams reportedly discovered items suggesting preparation for rapid travel, including a red leather tote containing maps of Paris, Spain, and other locations, as well as four $100 bills. The name of a museum in Puerto Vallarta, Mexico, was also found, which authorities suggested could have served as a rendezvous point with Cuban contacts in the event of an emergency departure. Additional materials recovered included documents and items considered indicative of tradecraft and possession of classified information.

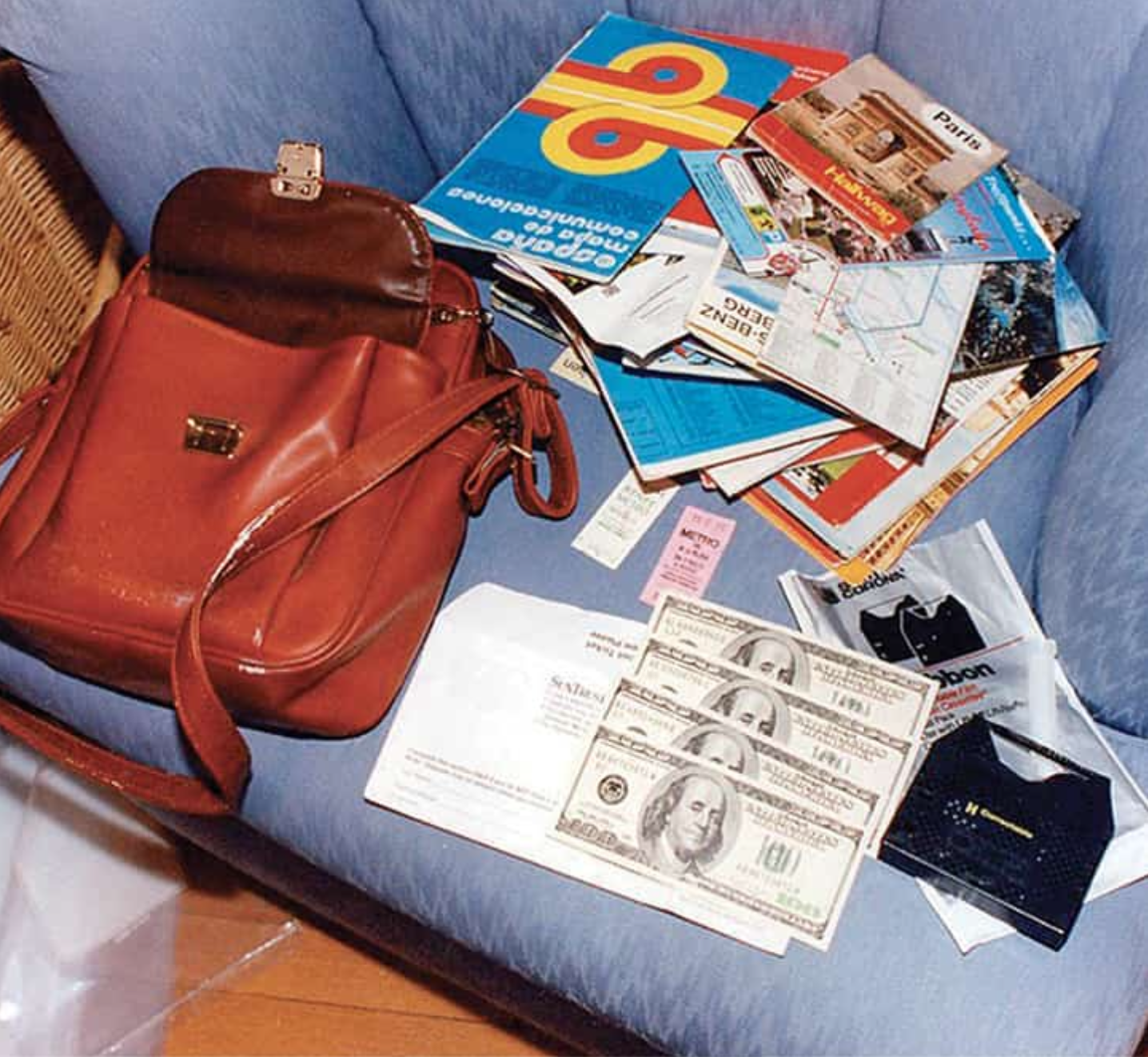
Montes’s bag containing maps and cash, recovered after her arrest

On October 16, 2002, Montes pleaded guilty to the charge that carried a potential death sentence and was subsequently sentenced to 25 years in prison after accepting a plea agreement with the U.S. government. At her sentencing hearing, she criticized U.S. policy toward Cuba as “cruel and unfair” and stated that she “felt morally obligated to help the island defend itself from our efforts to impose our values and our political system on it.” Following her guilty plea, Montes told CIA debriefers that her actions were motivated by a desire to protect Cuba from the United States and that she believed “all the world is one country.” In a 2013 letter from prison to a friend, she reflected on the ethics of espionage, writing: “I believe that the morality of espionage is relative. The activity always betrays someone, and some observers will think that it is justified and others not, in every case.”

== Incarceration ==
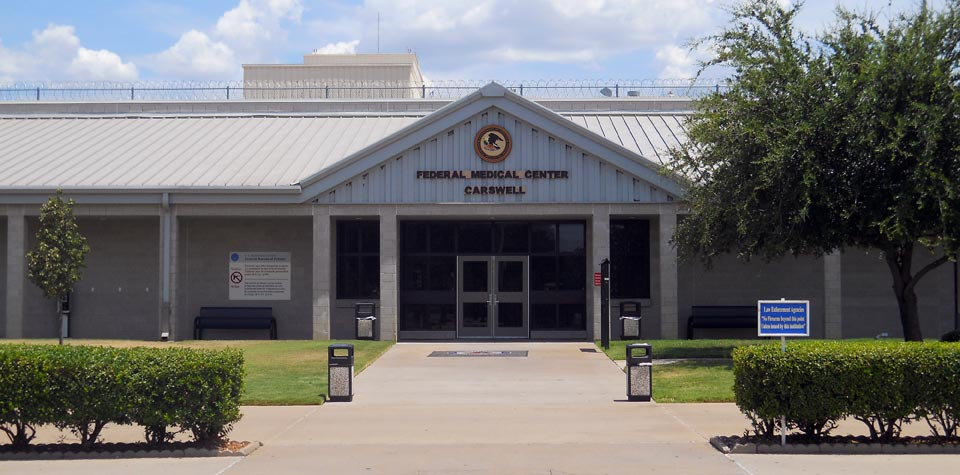
FMC Carswell, where Montes was incarcerated

Montes was incarcerated at Federal Medical Center (FMC) Carswell in Fort Worth, Texas. FMC Carswell is listed by the Federal Bureau of Prisons as a facility located in the northeast corner of the Naval Air Station, Joint Reserve Base, Fort Worth, which provides specialized medical and mental health services to female offenders.

Montes is listed as FMC Register #25037-016. She was released on January 6, 2023. Having been released, she will be monitored, including her internet usage, for five years. Montes will not be allowed to contact "foreign agents" or work for the U.S. government "without permission".

She is currently living in Puerto Rico and continues to speak out against U.S. sanctions against Cuba.

== See also ==
- Kendall Myers
- Manuel Rocha
