= Military ranks of El Salvador =

The Military ranks of El Salvador are the military insignia used by the Armed Forces of El Salvador.

== Commissioned officer ranks ==
The rank insignia of commissioned officers.

Rank group	General / flag officers				Senior officers			Junior officers
Salvadoran Army
Salvadoran Army	General de ejército	General de división	General de brigada	Brigadier	Coronel	Teniente coronel	Mayor	Capitán	Teniente	Subteniente
Navy of El Salvador
Navy of El Salvador	Almirante	Vicealmirante	Contralmirante	Comodoro	Capitán de navío	Capitán de fragata	Capitán de corbeta	Teniente de navío	Teniente de fragata	Teniente de corbeta
Salvadoran Air Force
Salvadoran Air Force	General del aire	General de avación	General de brigada aérea	Brigadier	Coronel	Teniente coronel	Mayor	Capitán	Teniente	Subteniente
Rank group	General / flag officers				Senior officers			Junior officers

== Other ranks ==
The rank insignia of non-commissioned officers and enlisted personnel.

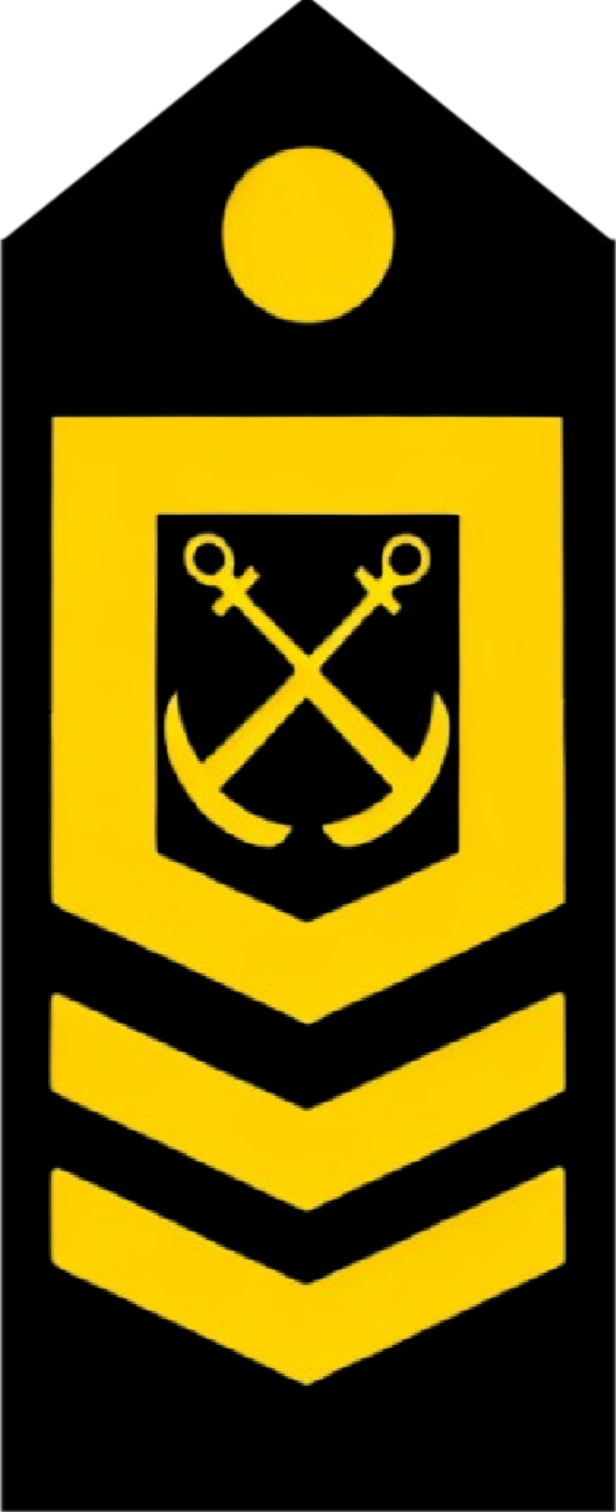
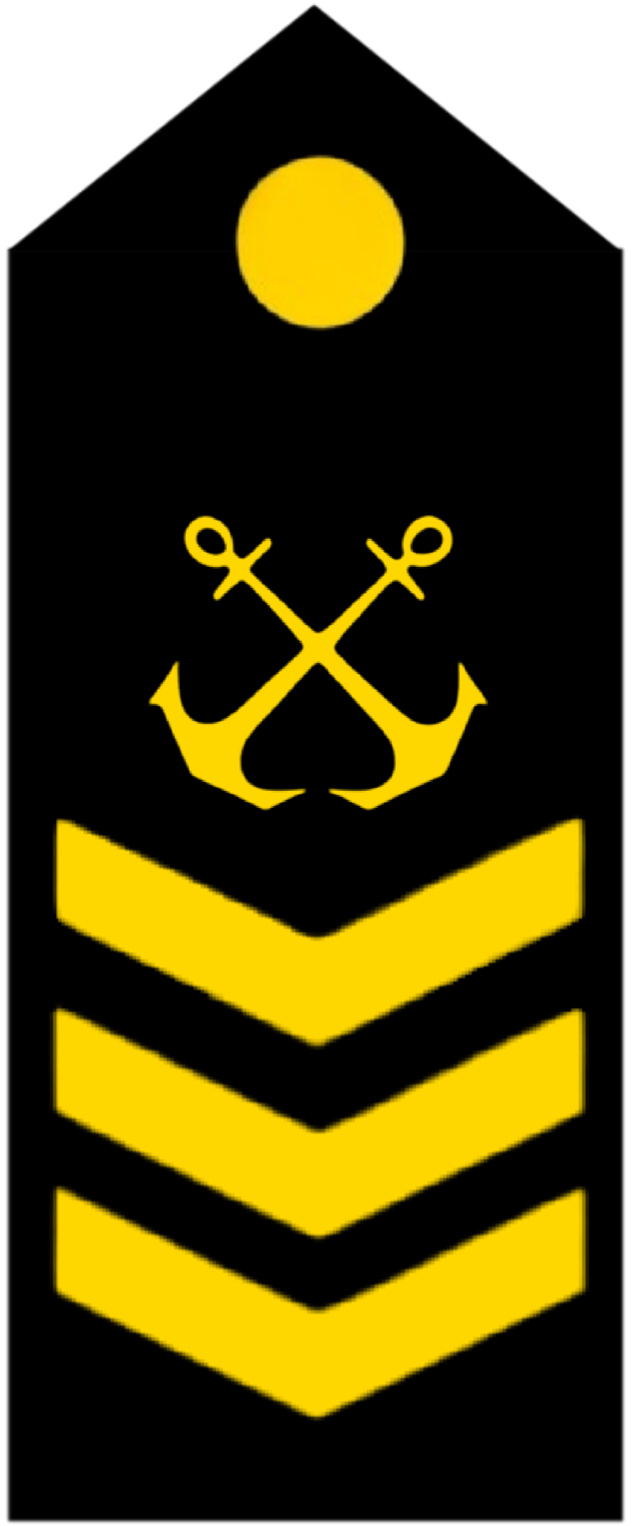
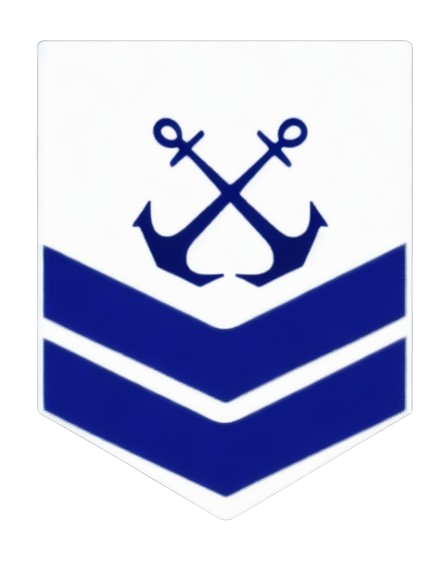
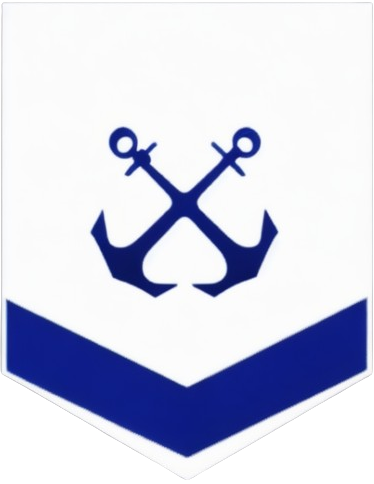
Rank group	Senior NCOs							Junior NCOs	Enlisted
Salvadoran Army										No insignia
Salvadoran Army	Sargento mayor de división	Sargento mayor de brigada	Sargento mayor primero	Sargento mayor	Sargento primero	Sargento	Subsargento	Cabo	Dragoneante	Soldado
Navy of El Salvador										No insignia
Navy of El Salvador	Maestre de flota	Maestre mayor	Maestre primero	Maestre	Sargento primero maestro	Sargento maestro	Subsargento maestro	Cabo maestro		Marinero
Salvadoran Air Force									|	No insignia
Salvadoran Air Force	Sargento mayor de aviación	Sargento mayor de brigada	Sargento mayor primero	Sargento mayor	Sargento primero	Sargento	Subsargento	Cabo	Dragoneante	Soldado
Rank group	Senior NCOs							Junior NCOs	Enlisted

== Historic ranks ==
Prior to the adoption of the current rank structure, El Salvador used insignia based on the design guidelines of the Central American Defense Council.

=== Commissioned officer ranks ===
The rank insignia of commissioned officers.

Rank group	General / flag officers	Senior officers			Junior officers
Salvadoran Army (1968–)
Salvadoran Army (1968–)	General	Coronel	Teniente coronel	Mayor	Capitán	Teniente	Subteniente

=== Other ranks ===
The rank insignia of non-commissioned officers and enlisted personnel.

Rank group	Senior NCOs		Junior NCOs	Enlisted
Salvadoran Army (1968–)				No insignia
Salvadoran Army (1968–)	Sargento	Subsargento	Cabo	Soldado
