= Neyko Nenov =

Bulgarian general (1961–2015)

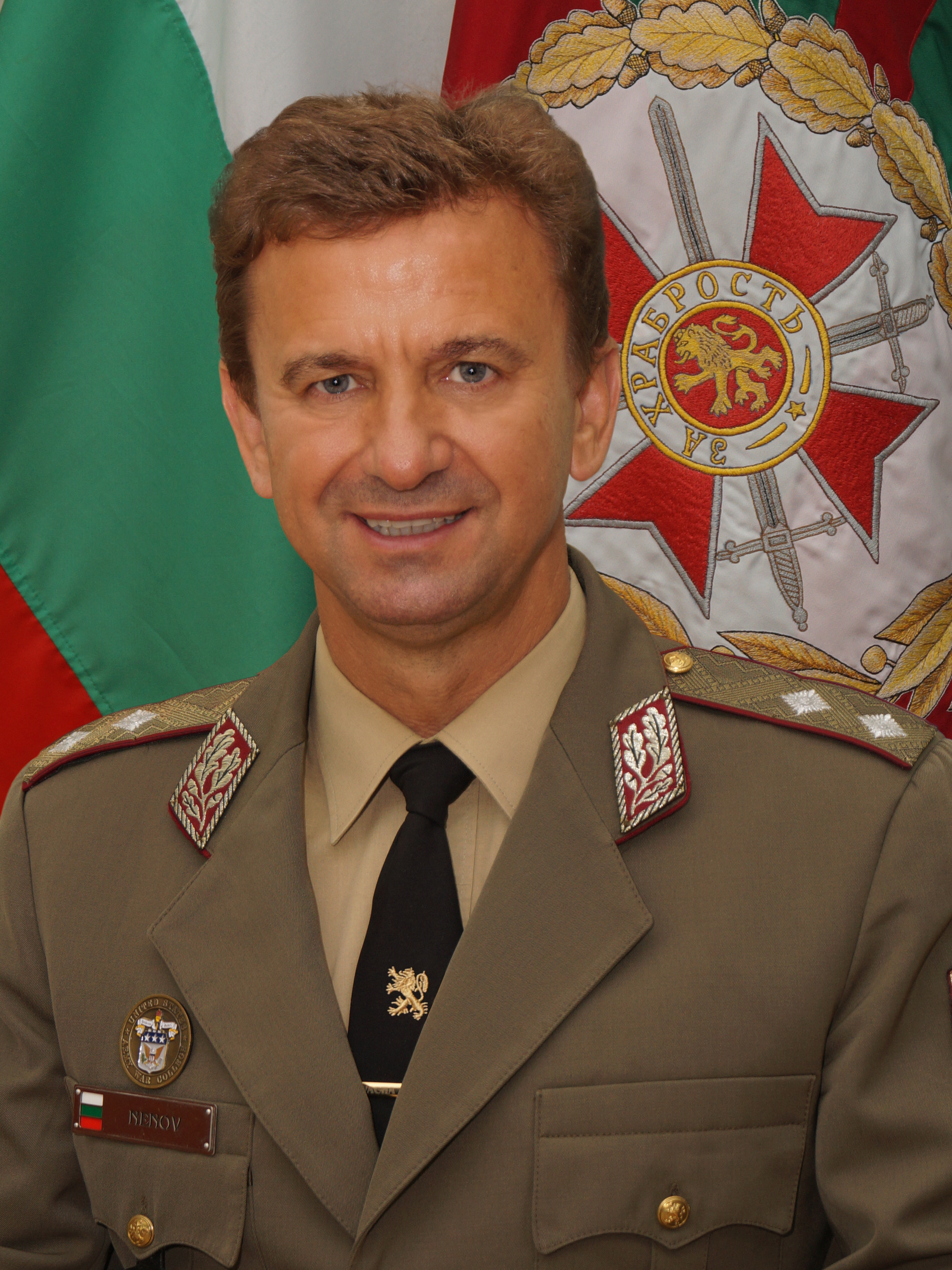
Major General Neyko Nenov in 2015

Neyko N. Nenov (Bulgarian: Нейко Н. Ненов) (18 November 1961 – 28 January 2015) was a Bulgarian major general.

== Education ==
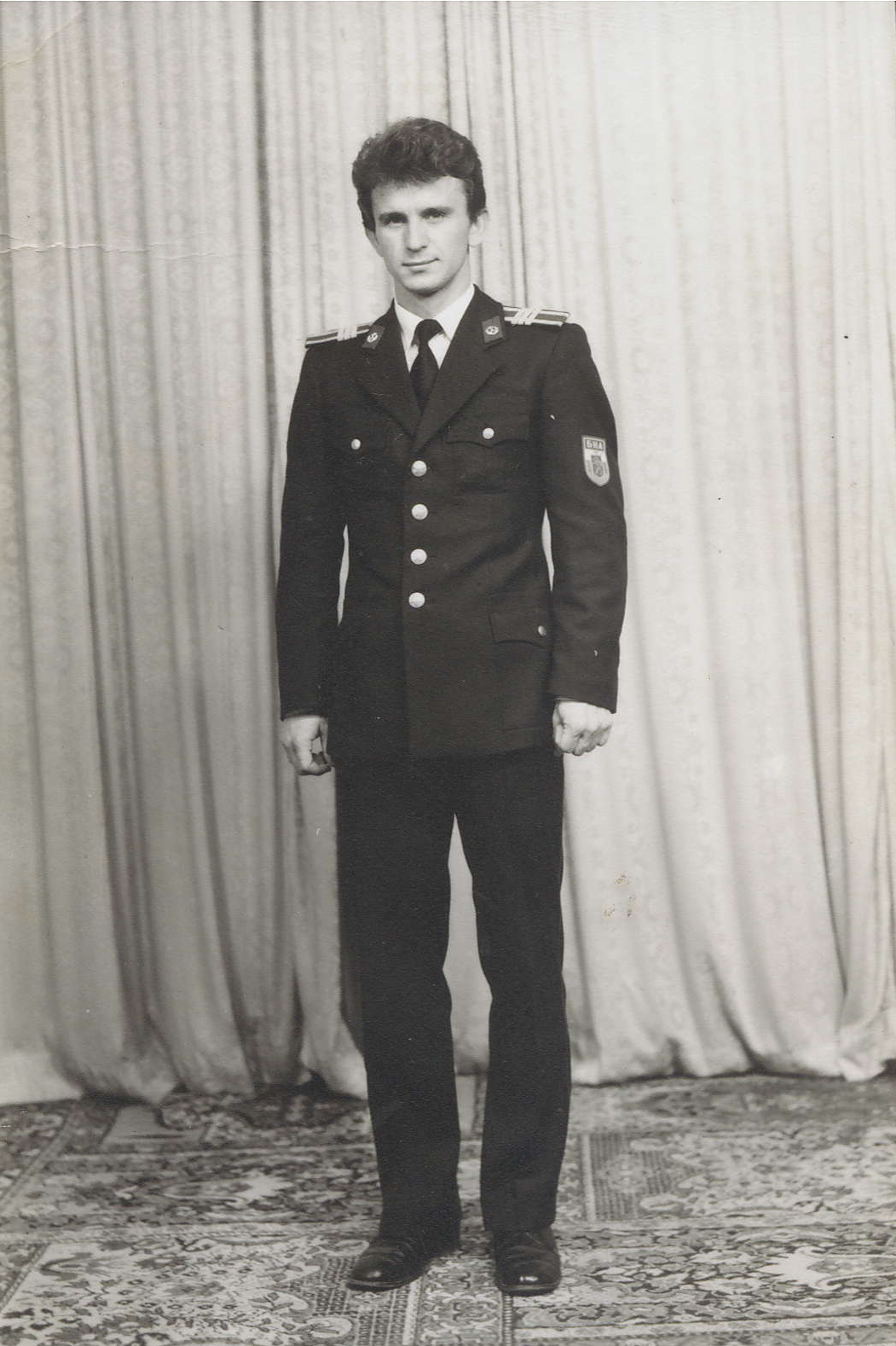
Neyko in 1985

Nenov was born in Trankovo, Yambol Province, Bulgaria. He graduated from Vasil Levski National Military University in 1985, and was commissioned into the military. From 1992–1995, he attended Rakovski Defence and Staff College in Sofia, earning a master's degree in military studies. Nenov earned a second masters in 2002, from the United States Army War College in Carlisle, Pennsylvania. Nenov obtained an LL.M from Veliko Tarnovo University in 2007.

== Military career ==
Major General Neyko Nenov assumed responsibility as Deputy Chief of Defence of the Republic of Bulgaria on June 30, 2014, after serving as Commander of the Bulgarian Land Forces for two years (2012-2014). During more than 29 years of service, he has commanded units at every echelon, from platoon to brigade, with tours of duty in Romania, Turkey, Afghanistan and Poland.

He started his military career as a platoon leader in Motorized Infantry Regiment in 1985. He continued his military service as a Company Commander and a Battalion Chief of Staff until 1992. In 1994, was assigned as Commander of Motorized Infantry Battalion, and later on as Commander of Motorized Infantry Regiment. He served at that position from 1998 to 2001 after which he attended the US Army War College at Carlisle Barracks, Pennsylvania. Upon completion, General Nenov was appointed as Chief of Staff of Mechanized Brigade, position which he held until 2004. Afterwards, from 2004 to 2005 he served as Commander of Light Infantry Brigade.

In 2005 he was promoted to the rank of Brigadier General and appointed Commander of South Eastern Europe Brigade (SEEBRIG), Constanta, Romania. That assignment took him to Afghanistan for six months where he served as Combat Commander of Multinational Brigade, Kabul, ISAF, Afghanistan. Following the tour of duty as SEEBRIG Commander, Brigadier General Nenov was assigned Assistant Chief of Staff for Training at the Bulgarian Land Forces Headquarters followed by an assignment as Chief of Staff of the Joint Operational Command.

From 2008 to 2010 General Nenov held the position Chief of Staff of NATO Joint Forces Training Center, Bydgoszcz, Poland. Upon completion of that significant assignment, he served as First Deputy Chief of the Bulgarian Land Forces from 2010 to 2011.

Following the transformation of the Bulgarian Armed Forces, in 2011 he assumed responsibilities as Deputy Commander of the Bulgarian Land Forces and in 2012 - Commander of the Bulgarian Land Forces.

Nenov died of a brain tumor on 28 January 2015, aged 53.

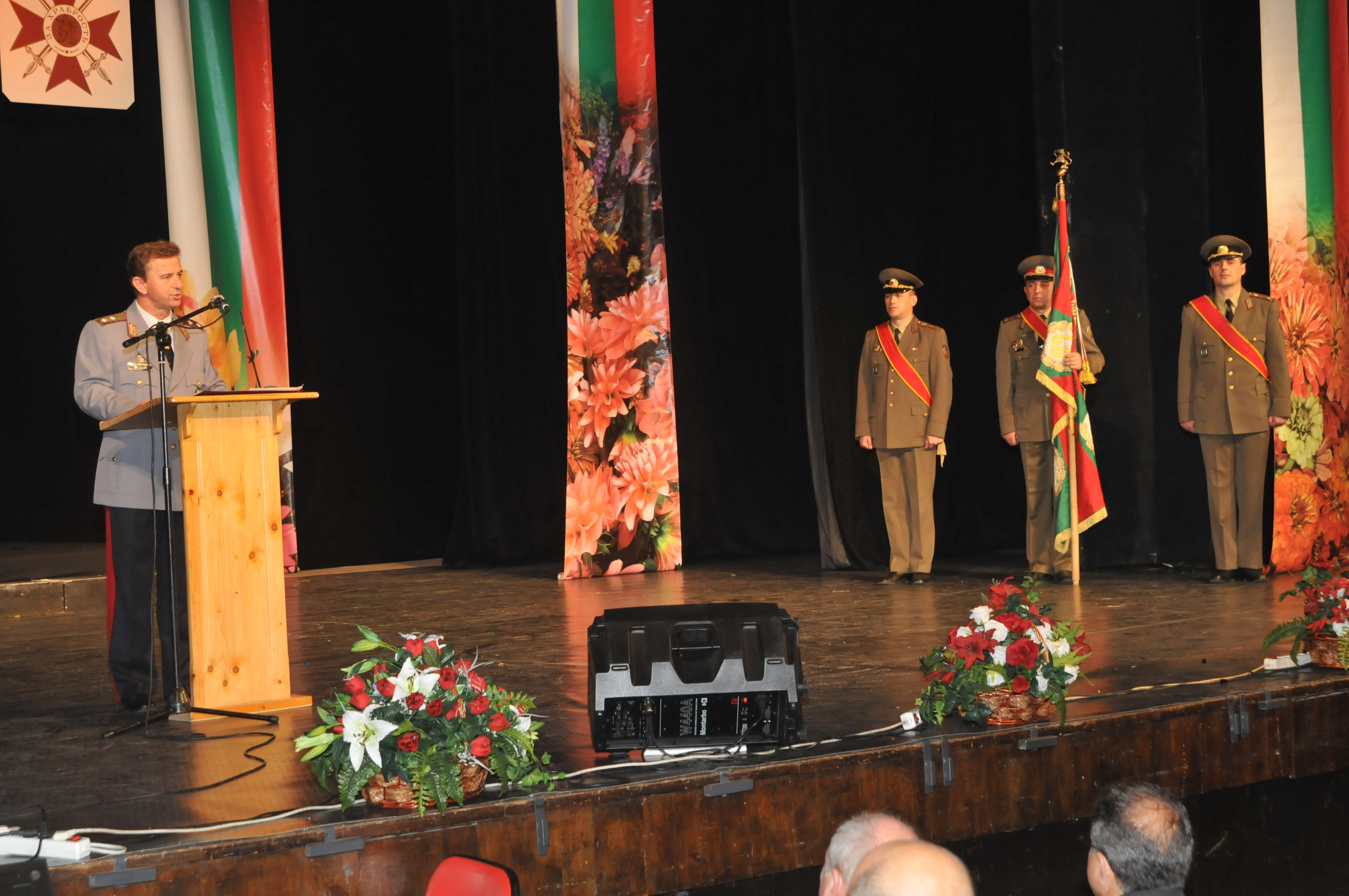
As a Commander of the Bulgarian Land Forces.

== Honours ==
On January 7, 2016, Nenov was inducted into the International Fellows Hall of Fame.

The U.S. Army War College established the International Fellows Hall of Fame on 1 October 1987. The hall of fame provides a prestigious and visible means of honoring international fellow graduates who have attained, through military merit, the highest positions in their nation’s armed forces, or who have held an equivalent position by rank or responsibility in a multinational military organization.

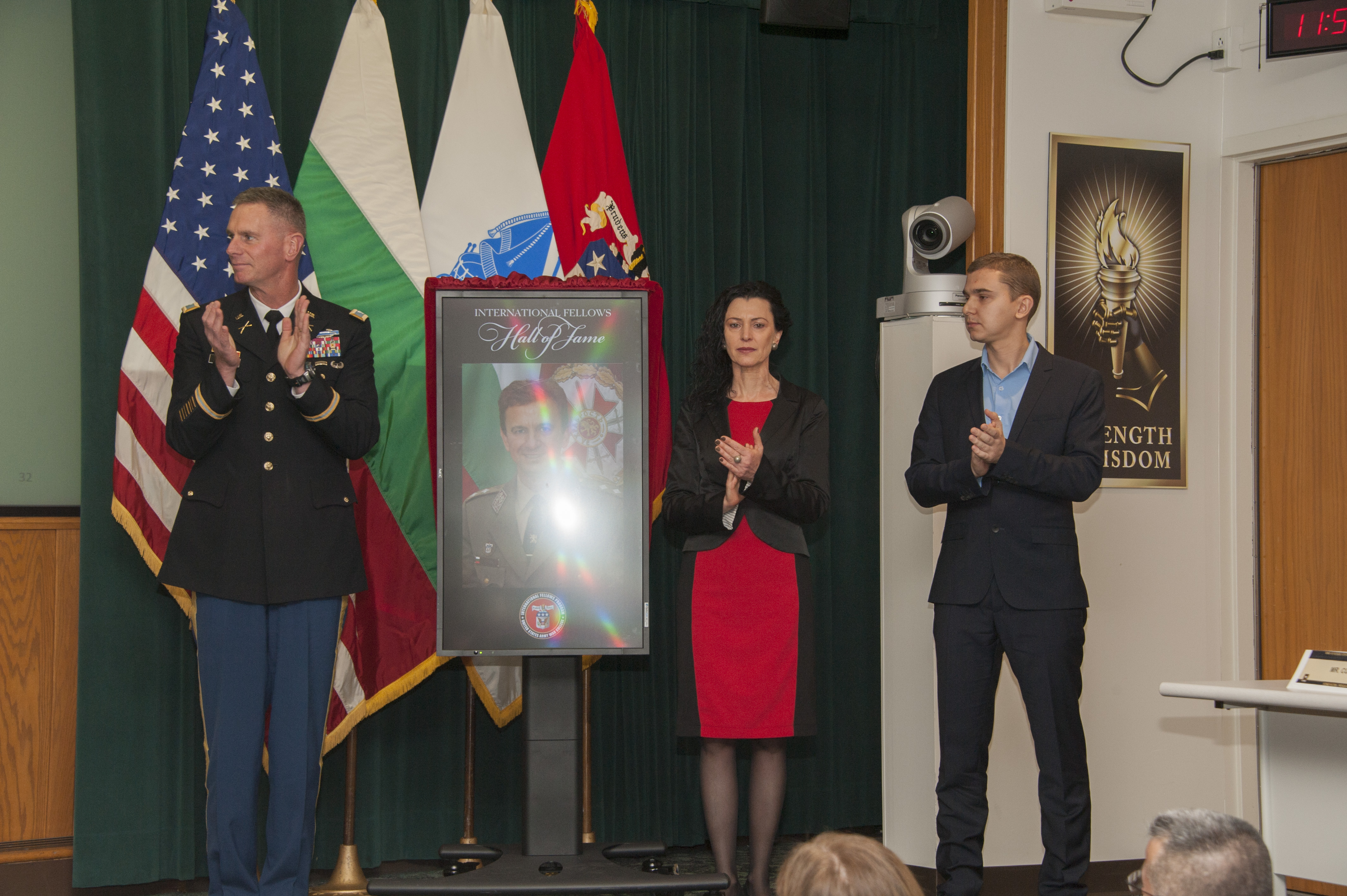
Induction Ceremony at the IF Hall of Fame Copyright: USAWC

General Nenov became the 59th inductee into the International Fellows Hall of Fame.

Other honours and awards:

- Excellence Medal, 1988
- The Order For Loyal Service Under The Banner third class, 1998; first class 2006
- Gold Medal of the Polish Army
- Decoration of Merit, 2011
- Army Officer’s dagger, 2011
- His meritorious service has earned him numerous awards to include medals, presented by the Secretary General of NATO,
- the President of the Republic of Romania,
- the Defence Minister of Germany,
- the Defence Minister of France,
- the Defence Minister of Albania,
- and a Gold Medal of the Polish Army presented by the Polish Minister of Defence.

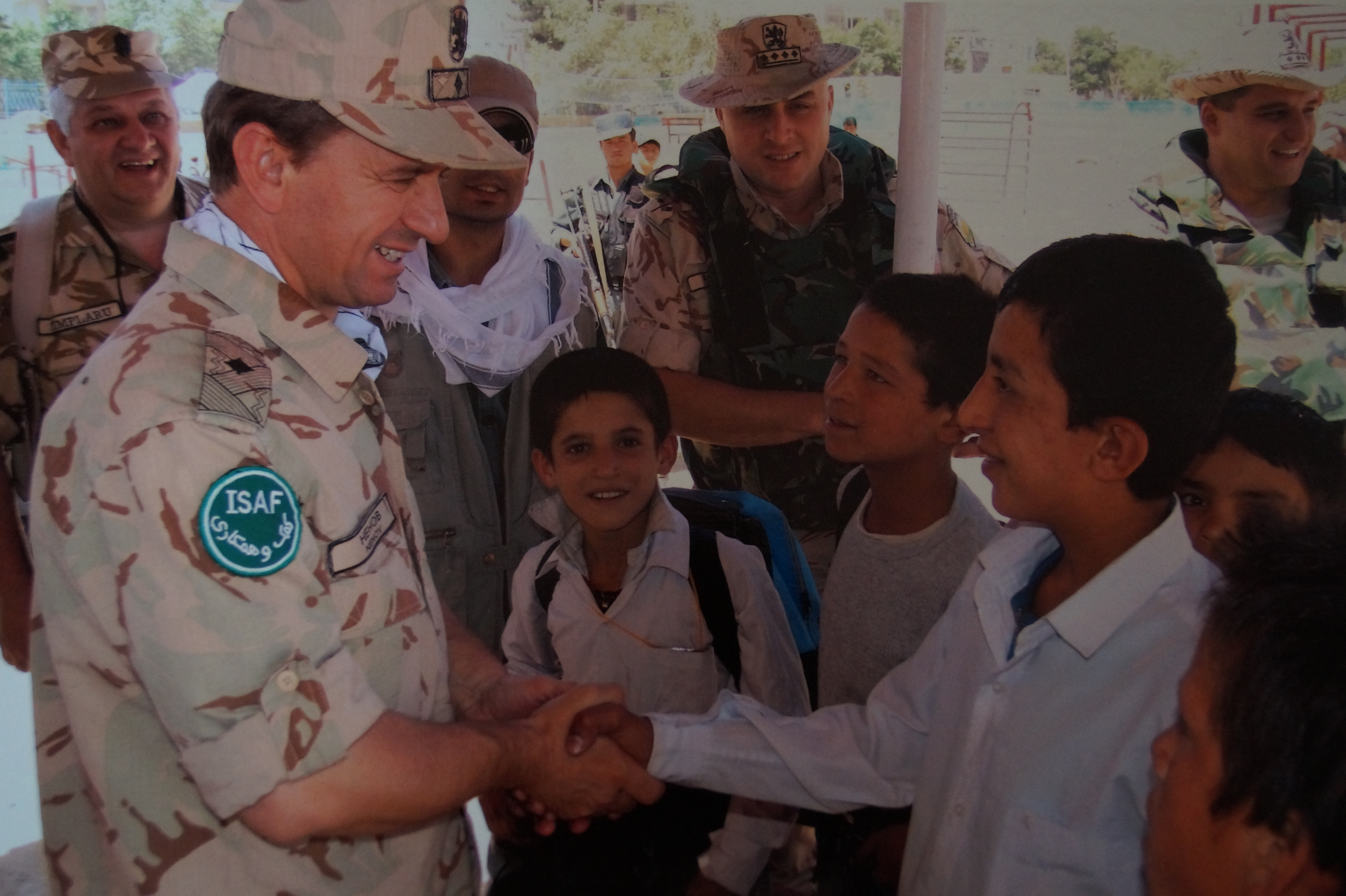
Combat Commander of Multinational Brigade, Kabul, ISAF, Afghanistan
