= Albert Schaufelberger =

United States Navy officer

Lieutenant commander Albert Schaufelberger
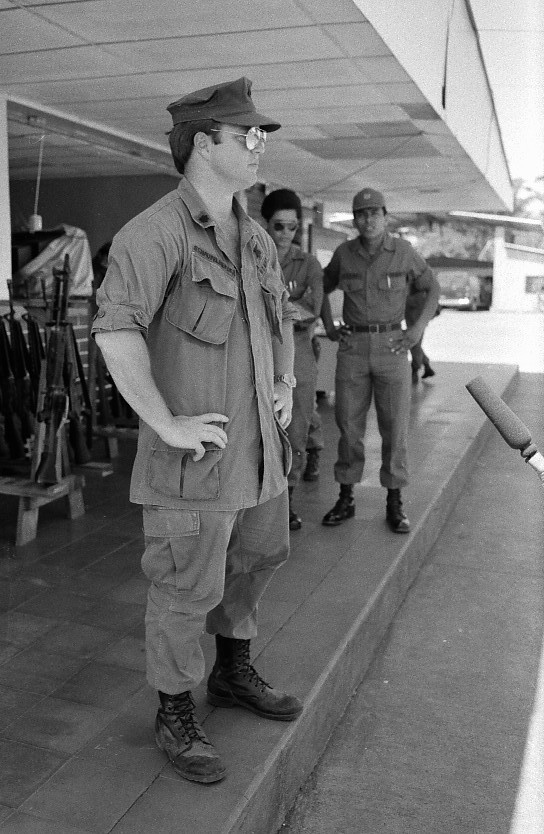
- Lt. Cmdr. Schaufelberger meets the press in May 1983 just days before his death
- Born: Albert Arthur Schaufelberger; August 8, 1949; United States
- Died: May 25, 1983 (aged 33); San Salvador, El Salvador
- Cause of death: Assassination
- Military career
- Allegiance: United States; El Salvador
- Branch: United States Navy; Salvadoran Armed Forces
- Service years: 1971–1983
- Rank: Lieutenant commander
- Conflicts: Salvadoran Civil War X

Albert Arthur Schaufelberger (August 8, 1949 – May 25, 1983) was a lieutenant commander in the United States Navy who was assassinated in El Salvador.

== Background ==
Schaufelberger was a graduate of the United States Naval Academy at Annapolis, Maryland, class of 1971 and was an avid (150 lb) American football and lacrosse player while in college. His father, Albert Arthur Schaufelberger (Senior), was a decorated fighter and bomber pilot during the Vietnam War.

== Role in El Salvador ==
Schaufelberger was commissioned as an ensign in the U.S. Navy on June 9, 1971. ENS Schaufelberger next attended Basic Underwater Demolition/SEAL (BUD/S) training with Class 65 at NAB Coronado, California, from August 1971 to March 1972, followed by service with Underwater Demolition Team TWELVE from March 1972 to June 1975. LT Schaufelberger's next assignment was as the Swimmer Delivery Vehicle (SDV) Platoon commander with SEAL Team ONE at NAB Coronado from June 1975 to November 1976, and then as an SDV instructor with BUD/S training at NAB Coronado from November 1976 to January 1979. He served as an ordnance officer, platoon commander and operations officer with SEAL Team ONE at Coronado from January 1979 to February 1981, and then attended the Spanish Language Course at the Defense Language Institute in Monterey, California, from February 1981 to February 1982.

Lieutenant commander Schaufelberger became the senior U.S. Naval representative at the U.S. Military Group, El Salvador in August 1982. He was a United States Navy SEAL, second in command of the U.S. Military Group advising the Salvadoran Armed Forces on counterinsurgency, special operations, and weapons traffic interdiction operations. In addition, he was security chief for the 53 U.S. military advisors in the country at the time. Schaufelberger had responsibility, among other duties, for naval operations in the Gulf of Fonseca which were run out of the La Unión naval base. It was at the La Unión naval base where Schaufelberger allowed himself to be photographed for the last time several days before his assassination. Schaufelberger's death was the first of a U.S. military member in El Salvador following the October 1980 arrival in country of U.S. military advisors.

== Assassination ==
At approximately 6:30 p.m. on May 25, 1983, Schaufelberger was assassinated on the grounds of the Central American University in San Salvador. A group under the umbrella of the Farabundo Martí National Liberation Front (FMLN), the Revolutionary Party of Central American Workers (PRTC), is thought to have carried out the act.

Schaufelberger had been dating the manager of a cooperative store, Consuelo Escalante Aguilera, for several months and developed a routine of picking her up at the same time and place. On May 25 he arrived and sounded the horn of his armored embassy-provided Ford Maverick, his signal to inform his date that he had arrived. Ms. Aguilera exited her office and observed what she believed to be a white Volkswagen microbus pull up and stop near Schaufelberger's car. Reportedly several individuals were involved with the assassination, with at least one firing through the open window of Schaufelberger's car. Schaufelberger was shot four times in the head. Schaufelberger's car leaped forward, impacting a car directly in front of it. The assassins then jumped into their vehicle and escaped. Unfortunately for him, Schaufelberger had removed the bullet-resistant glass over the driver's-side window after the air conditioner in his vehicle had broken.

== Press coverage ==
Schaufelberger's assassination was featured on the front cover of the June 6, 1983, edition of Newsweek magazine. The U.S. edition was headlined The First Casualty and the international edition Shooting to Kill.

Schaufelberger was photographed in uniform and interviewed by international media representatives (including Newsweek) one week before his death. Previous pictures of Schaufelberger had been taken by the Magnum Photo Agency in Paris for a syndicated feature story on the escalating U.S. military involvement in the region.

== See also ==
- Salvadoran Civil War
- 1985 Zona Rosa attacks
