= Military ranks of Bolivia =

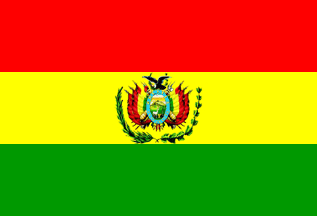
Bolivian Military Flag

The Armed Forces of Bolivia has four main branches: Army, Navy, Air Force and the National Police Force. Each of the four branches has a similar structure, each having four pay grades: non-commissioned officers, senior non-commissioned officers, commissioned officers and general staff. However, the SNCO roles vary depending on the branch; some of these hold specialisations.

== Army ==
The Army trains all its personnel in the following:

- Army NCO School, Sucre
- Military College of Bolivia, La Paz

=== Officer ranks ===
Rank group	General / flag officers			Senior officers			Junior officers
Parade dress
Combat uniform
Bolivian Army
Bolivian Army	General de ejército	General de división	General de brigada	Coronel	Teniente coronel	Mayor	Captáin	Teniente	Subteniente

=== Enlisted ranks ===
Rank group	Senior NCOs						Junior NCOs		Enlisted
Parade dress
Combat uniform
Bolivian Army
Bolivian Army	Sub-oficial maestre	Sub-oficial mayor	Sub-oficial 1°	Sub-oficial 2°	Sub-oficial inicial	Sargento 1°	Sargento 2°	Sargento inicial°	Cabo	Dragoneante	Soldado raso

== Navy ==
Despite being a landlocked country, Bolivia has a large quantity of rivers and lakes which the majority of their naval operations take place on, one example of this is Lake Titicaca, which is shared between Bolivia and Peru.

The Navy, unlike the other three branches, has different specialisations for the NCOs and SNCOs once they reach the rank of 'seaman'. Once a specialisation has been achieved, the sailors' insignia will be adjusted slightly, to make his/her profession more visible. Those corps are as follows:

- Machinist Corps
- Medical Corps
- Divers Corps
- Logistics Corps
- Quartermasters Corps
- Signals Corps

Insignia							
Paygrade	NCO	SNCO	Both	Both	Both	Both	Both
Corps	Machinist		Medical	Divers	Logistics	Quartermasters	Signals

Any rank between Seaman and Master Chief Petty Officer can have a specialisation as part of their regular rank insignia, the only corps where the insignia varies is within the Machinist Corps, where both NCO and SNCO have a different insignia, this also helps determine their qualifications and what they are responsible for.

The most Senior Non-Commissioned Officer, Fleet Master Chief Petty Officer, holds no specific specialisation. The SNCO would have been a specialist at a lower rank. This sailor would also be the overseer of each of the Corps, ensuring that this branch's members are fully trained and equipped.

=== Officer ranks ===
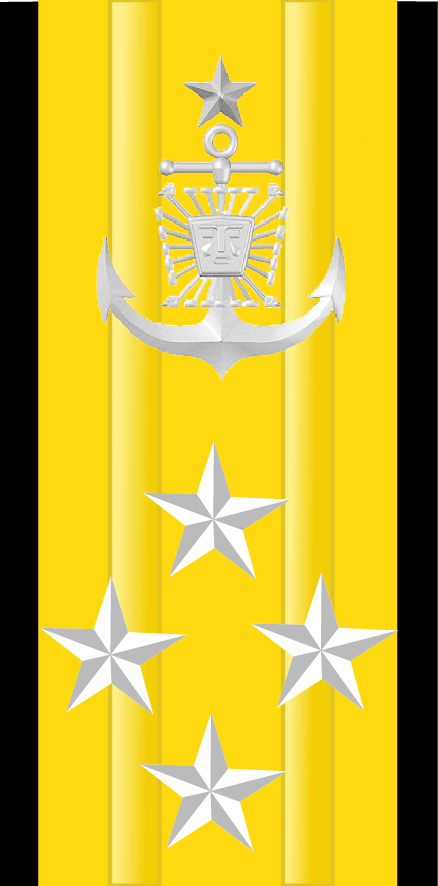
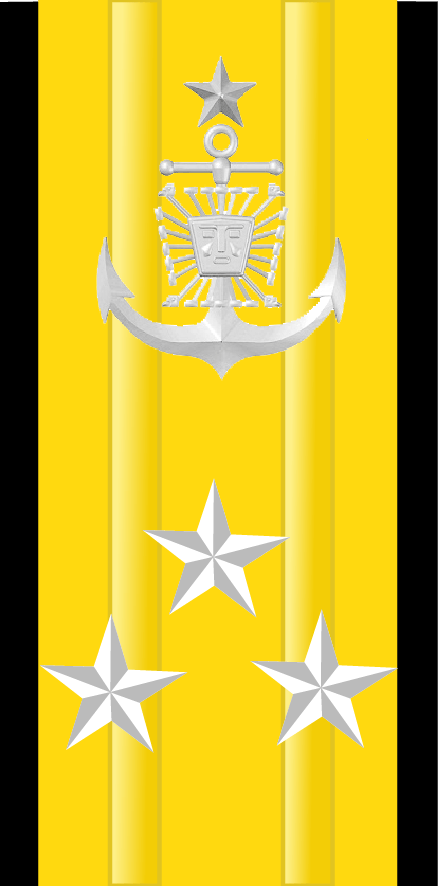
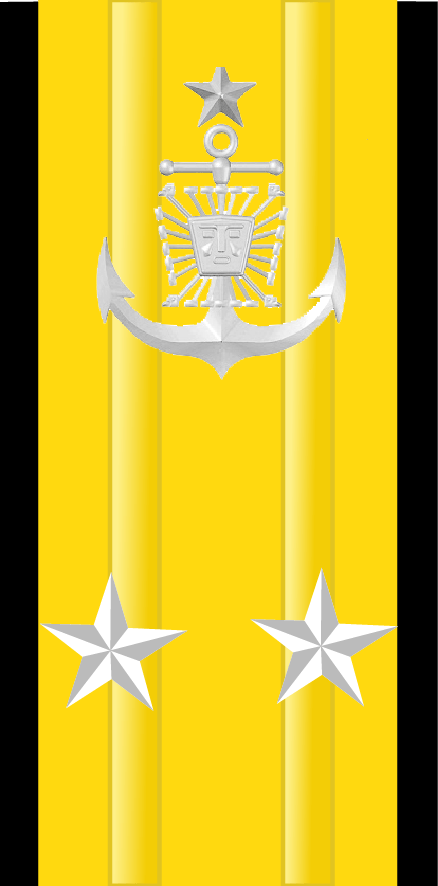
Rank group	General / flag officers			Senior officers			Junior officers
Bolivian Navy
Bolivian Navy	Almirante	Vicealmirante	Contraalmirante	Capitán de navío	Capitán de fragata	Capitán de corbeta	Teniente de navío	Teniente de fragata	Alférez

=== Enlisted ranks ===
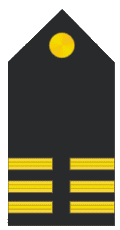
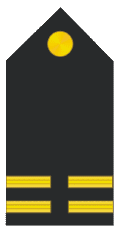
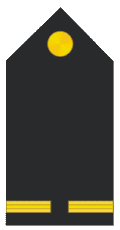
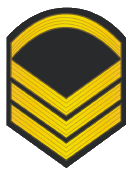
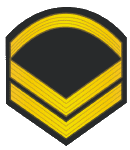
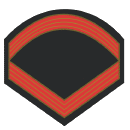
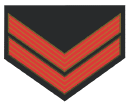
Rank group	Senior NCOs							Junior NCOs		Enlisted
Bolivian Navy											No insignia
Bolivian Navy	Sub-oficial maestre	Sub-oficial mayor	Sub-oficial primero	Sub-oficial segundo	Sub-oficial inicial	Sargento primero	Sargento segundo	Sargento inicial	Cabo conscripto	Marinero de primero	Marinero de segunda

== Air Force ==
=== Officer ranks ===
Rank group	General / flag officers			Senior officers			Junior officers
Bolivian Air Force
Bolivian Air Force	General de fuerza aeréa	General de división aeréa	General de brigada aeréa	Coronel aviador	Teniente coronel aviador	Mayor aviador	Captáin aviador	Teniente aviador	Subteniente aviador

=== Enlisted ranks ===
Rank group	Senior NCOs							Junior NCOs		Enlisted
Bolivian Air Force
Bolivian Air Force	Sub-oficial maestre	Sub-oficial mayor	Sub-oficial primero	Sub-oficial segundo	Sub-oficial inicial	Sergento primero	Sargento segundo	Sargento inicial	Cabo	Dragoneante	Soldado raso

== Honorary ranks ==
In the Armed Forces, the title Marshal is a military distinction granted to generals for exceptional achievements and it is used to denote a senior military leader. Unlike other military titles named "marshal", it is not a military rank. Six individuals in the history of Bolivia have been assigned the rank: Antonio José de Sucre, Marshal of Ayacucho; Andrés de Santa Cruz, Marshal of Zepita; Otto Philipp Braun, Marshal of Montenegro; José Ballivián, Marshal of Ingavi; Bernardino Bilbao Rioja, Marshal of Kilometer 7 ; and Juana Azurduy de Padilla, Marshal of the Greath Fatherland (posthumous).

== Historical ranks ==
The ranks were introduced in 1968, based on design by the Central American Defense Council (Spanish: Consejo de Defensa Centroamericano; CONDECO).

Officers

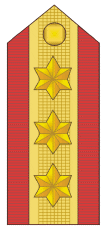
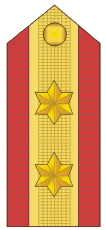
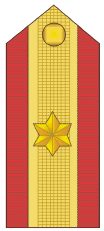
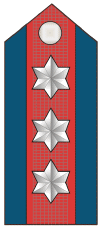
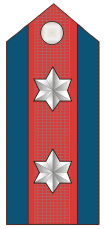
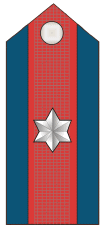
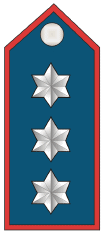
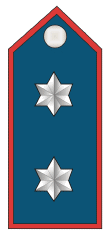
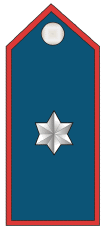
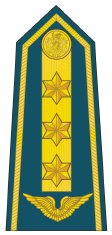
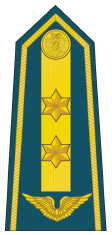
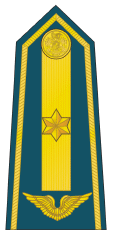
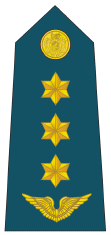
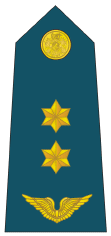
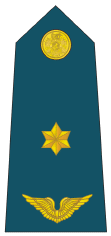
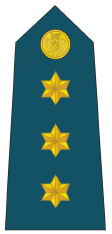
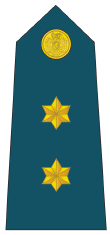
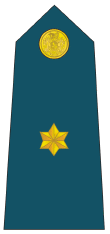
Rank group	General / flag officers			Senior officers			Junior officers
Bolivian Army (1968–2019)
Bolivian Army (1968–2019)	General de ejercito	General de división	General de brigada	Coronel	Teniente coronel	Mayor	Capitán	Teniente		Subteniente
Bolivian Navy (1968–2019)
Bolivian Navy (1968–2019)	Almirante	Vicealmirante	Contraalmirante	Capitán de navío	Capitán de fragata	Capitán de corbeta	Teniente de navio	Teniente de fragata	Teniente de corbeta	Alférez
Bolivian Air Force (1968–2019)
Bolivian Air Force (1968–2019)	General de fuerza aeréa	General de división aeréa	General de brigada aeréa	Coronel aviador	Teniente coronel aviador	Mayor aviador	Capitán aviador	Teniente aviador		Subteniente aviador

Enlisted

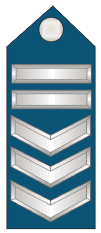
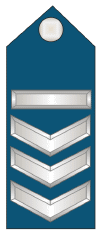
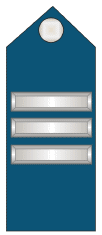
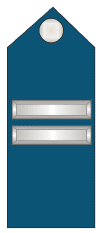
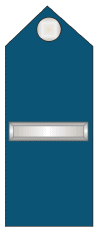
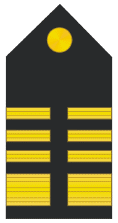
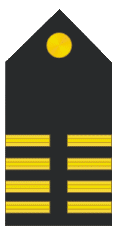
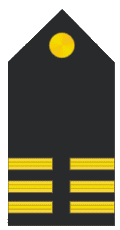
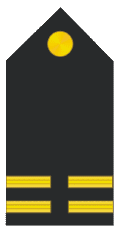
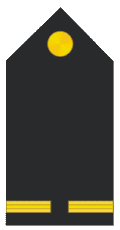
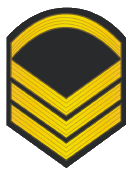
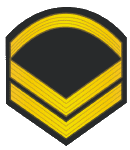
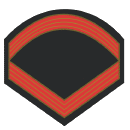
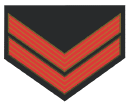
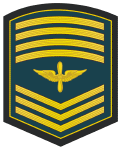
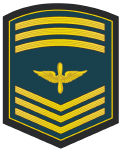
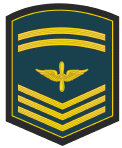
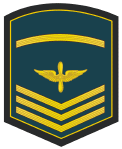
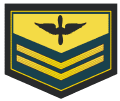
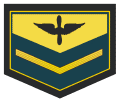
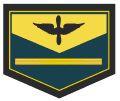
Rank group	Senior NCOs						Junior NCOs		Enlisted
Bolivian Army (1968–2019)									No insignia	No insignia
Bolivian Army (1968–2019)	Sub-oficial maestre	Sub-oficial mayor	Sub-oficial primero	Sub-oficial segundo	Sub-oficial inicial	Sargento primero	Sargento segundo	Cabo	Dragoneante	Soldado
Bolivian Navy (1968–2019)
Bolivian Navy (1968–2019)	Sub-oficial maestre	Sub-oficial mayor	Sub-oficial primero	Sub-oficial segundo	Sub-oficial inicial	Sargento primero	Sargento segundo	Cabo	Marinero de primero	Marinero de segunda
Bolivian Air Force (1968–2019)										No insignia
Bolivian Air Force (1968–2019)	Sub-oficial maestre	Sub-oficial mayor	Sub-oficial primero	Sub-oficial segundo	Sub-oficial inicial	Sargento primero	Sargento segundo	Cabo	Dragoneante	Soldado
