= 1985 Zona Rosa attacks =

1985 mass shooting of a restaurant in San Salvador during the Salvadoran Civil War

Coordinates: 13.69°N 89.190°W

The Zona Rosa attack was a guerrilla attack that took place in the Zona Rosa restaurant area of San Salvador, El Salvador at approximately 21:30 on June 19, 1985, during the Salvadoran Civil War. The attack was conducted by gunmen dressed as Salvadoran soldiers, and in total twelve people were killed: four United States Marines, two United States businessmen, a Guatemalan, a Chilean, and four Salvadorans. A left-wing guerrilla group, the Revolutionary Party of Central American Workers, and its armed wing, the Mardoqueo Cruz Urban Commando claimed responsibility for the attack.

In July 1985, as part of the Combat Terrorism Act, the United States offered a reward of US$100,000 for information leading to the conviction of the attackers. By September 1985, the Salvadoran government had arrested four men; one of them was Américo Mauro Araujo, a high-ranking Salvadoran Communist Party official. Seven others who were involved in the attack, however, were never apprehended.

== See also ==
- El Mozote massacre
- Albert Schaufelberger
