= United States Army War College International Fellows Hall of Fame =

The US AWC International Fellows Hall of Fame honors USAWC international graduates "who have attained, through military merit, the highest positions in their nation's armed forces, or who have held an equivalent position by rank or responsibility in a multinational organization."

Commandant of USAWC DeWitt C. Smith is primarily responsible for the creation of the International Fellows Program's 1977. From a start with six foreign students in 1978, the program now sustains over forty International Fellows (IFs) per year. Usually, only one IF per representative country per academic year participates in the program. While the fellows program was established in 1978 and the first induction into the IF Hall of Fame took place in 1988. Inductees are awarded in person at Carlisle Barracks. Since its inception over 1,900 international fellows graduate from 130 countries have been part of the fellows program.

== List of IF Hall of Fame fellows ==
List of fellows
Fellow No.	Flag	Country	Name	Year	Ref
		Botswana	Louis Matshwenyego Fisher	1998	
		Norway	GEN Paal Frisvold	2005	
		Bangladesh	LG Hasan Mashhud Chowdhury	2005	
31		Canada	GEN Walter Natynczyk	2009	
32		Denmark	MG Niels Bundsgaard	2011	
33		India	GEN Vijay Kumar Singh	2011	
		India	GEN Bikram Singh	2013	
43		Hungary	GEN Tibor Benko	2013	
48		Chile	GEN Humberto Oviedo	2014	
49		Oman	MG Matar Salim Al Balushi	2014	
50		Korea	GEN Seung Jo Jung	2014	
51		Uganda	GEN Edward Katumba Wamala	2014	
52		Denmark	GEN Knud Bartel	2014	
53		United Nations	MG Kristin Lund	2015	
54		Lithuania	MG Almantas Lieka (Almantas Leika)	2015	
55		Austria	GEN Othmar Commenda	2015	
56		Tunisia	BG Ismail Fathalli	2015	
57		Romania	GEN Nicolae Ciucă	2015	
58		Albania	MG Jeronim Bazo	2015	
59		Bulgaria	MG Neyko Nenov	2016	
60		Czech Republic	MG Jan Gurnik	2016	
61		Nepal	GEN Rajendra Chhetri		
62		Norway	GEN Odin Johannessen		
63		Colombia	GEN Alberto José Mejía Ferrero	2017	
64		Estonia	BG Indrek Sirel	2017	
65		Estonia	BG Artur Tiganik	2017	
66		Georgia	MG Vladimer Chachibaia	2017	
67		Croatia	GEN Damir Krstičević	2018	
68	Republic of China	Taiwan/ROC	GEN Chiu Kuo-cheng	2018	
69		Norway	MG Eirik Kristoffersen	2019	
70		Norway	MG Torgeir Gråtrud	2019	
71		Malaysia	GEN Ahmad Hasbullah	2020	

|- | | |Kosovo |HE Ejup Maqedonci |2019 |
