= Armed Forces of El Salvador =

Combined military forces of El Salvador

- Fuerza Armada de El Salvador
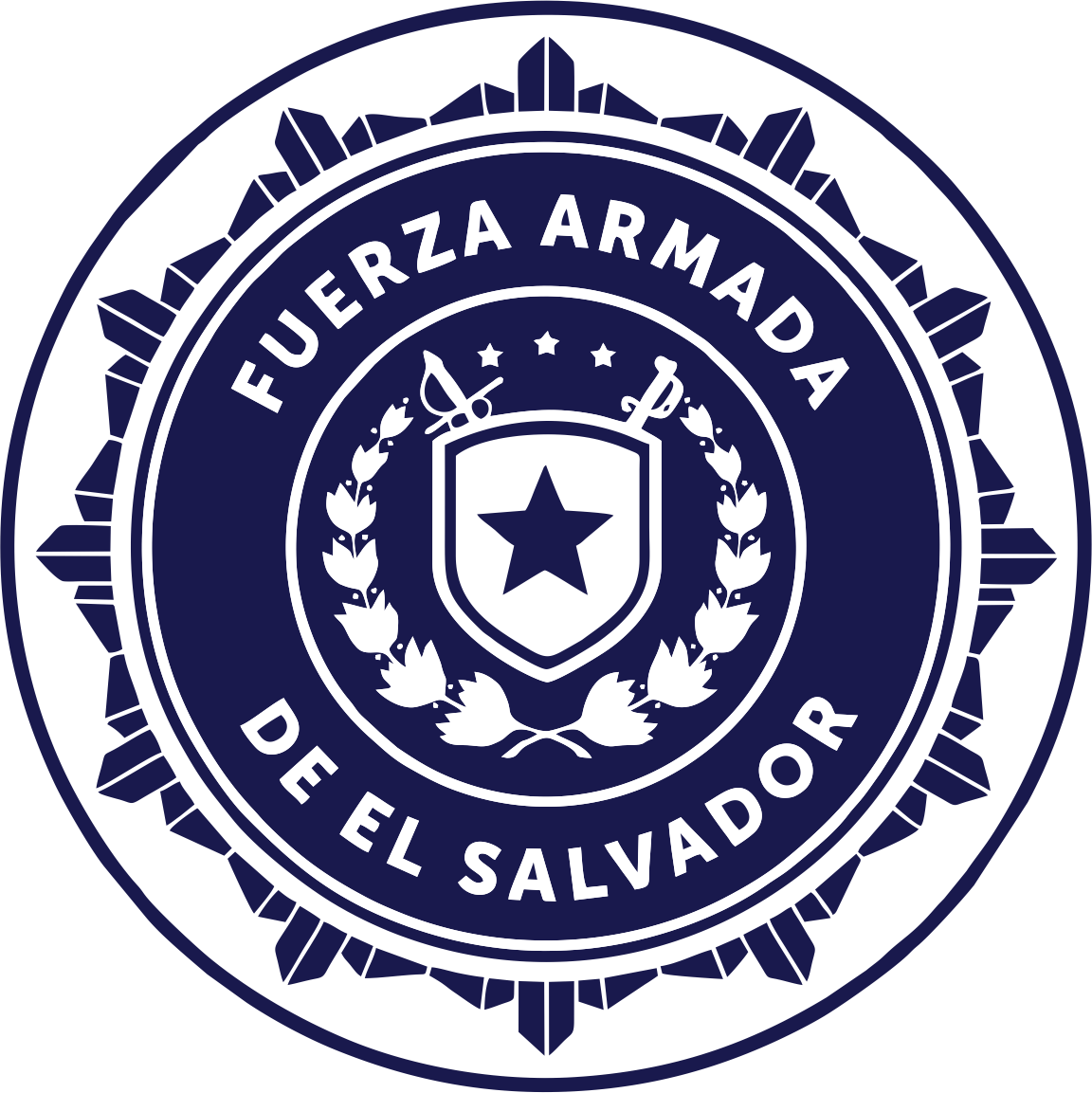
- Emblem of the Armed Forces

- Flag of the Armed Forces
- Founded: 7 May 1824; 202 years ago
- Service branches: Salvadoran Army; Navy of El Salvador; Salvadoran Air Force
- Headquarters: Km 5 1/2 Carretera a Santa Tecla, San Salvador, El Salvador

Leadership
- Commander-in-Chief: President Nayib Bukele
- Minister of National Defense: René Francis Merino Monroy
- Chief of the Joint Staff: Vice Admiral Exón Oswaldo Ascencio Albeño

Personnel
- Military age: 16 (voluntary); 18 (conscription)
- Active personnel: 24,500 (2024)
- Reserve personnel: 9,900 (2024)
- Deployed personnel: 56 (2024)

Expenditure
- Budget: US$251 million (2023)

Industry
- Foreign suppliers: Canada; Czech Republic; France; India; Indonesia; Israel; Italy; Japan; South Korea; Mexico; Russia; United States Former: Taiwan

Related articles
- History: War of 1863; Barrios' War of Reunification; War of 1907; La Matanza; World War II; Football War; Salvadoran Civil War; War on terror; Salvadoran gang crackdown; Haitian conflict (intervention)
- Ranks: Military ranks of El Salvador

The Armed Forces of El Salvador (Spanish: Fuerza Armada de El Salvador) are the military forces of El Salvador, consisting of three branches: the Salvadoran Army, the Salvadoran Air Force and the Navy of El Salvador. The President is the commander-in-chief, while administration is the responsibility of the Minister of National Defense. The legal basis of the military includes Articles 211 and 212 of the 1983 constitution, the 1998 Organic Law of the Armed Forces of El Salvador, and the 2002 National Defense Law.

The main focus of the armed forces in recent years has been combating organized crime. Under the Territorial Control Plan adopted in 2019, mixed military and police patrols, including large-scale deployments of military personnel, have taken place in high-crime areas. The Salvadoran armed forces have also had international peacekeeping deployments. El Salvador has partnerships with the United States and other regional countries focused on training, internal security, and providing support to civil authorities. Since the end of the civil war in 1992, the military has largely relied on Cold War-era platforms. As of 2024, the armed forces had 24,500 personnel, including 20,500 army, 2,000 in the navy, and 2,000 in the air force; supported by a reserve of 9,900 personnel.

== History ==
=== Foundation and early history ===
The colonies of the former Captaincy General of Guatemala declared independence from Spain on 15 September 1821, and immediately faced the threat of annexation by the Mexican Empire of the self-proclaimed emperor Agustín de Iturbide. Mexico briefly succeeded in subduing El Salvador until the emperor fell in 1823, after which point the Federal Republic of Central America was formed from five states. The first Salvadoran army was founded by Manuel José Arce, the president of the federation, on 7 May 1824, when he consolidated the cavalry units that had fought against the Mexican forces of Agustín de Iturbide. In present-day El Salvador, the annual holiday of the military is 7 May, officially the Day of the Salvadoran Soldier.

Starting from 1825, the militia received assistance from two French advisors and was involved in the conflict between liberal and conservative forces that occurred within the federation. El Salvador was a bastion of liberal sentiment and support for liberal president Francisco Morazán before other states decided to dissolve the federation in 1840. When El Salvador became independent, the country inherited most of Acre's troops, consisting of independent dragoon squadrons. Unlike the other Central American states, whose armies were little more than bandit gangs during the 19th century, the Salvadoran militia developed by the 1850s into a balanced and disciplined force of infantry, cavalry, and artillery with French and Colombian assistance. During the presidency of Gerardo Barrios from 1858 to 1863, the militia was reformed as a European-style national army, and in 1867 an officer training school was created, which was later named the Captain General Gerardo Barrios Military School. Nearly all military officers were criollos.

El Salvador inherited from the Spanish period the unequal distribution of land, granted to select individuals by the crown. The landed oligarchy kept this structure in place into the 20th century with the help of the Salvadoran military. In 1833, a rural rebellion led by Anastasio Aquino, an Indigenous leader, was put down by the oligarchy using hired forces. The military became institutionalized and separate from the oligarchy, and soldiers may have been nominally employed by the governing body. However, if not given their pay, the soldiers would supplement their income as mercenaries and militia for local politicians and landowners. The widespread cultivation of coffee began in El Salvador in the middle of the century, and the period from roughly 1871 to 1927 is known as the start of the coffee republic. The coffee elite provided the majority of government revenue and had domination over the state and its military.

In 1871, Santiago González seized power by military coup. General Carlos Ezeta did the same in 1890, General Rafael Antonio Gutiérrez in 1894, and General Tomás Regalado in 1898. However, these changes in power were fought between networks of rival landowners (coffee barons) and politicians under their patronage rather than between official military and government forces. The military suppressed opposition to the coffee oligarchy, and the oligarchy supported the professionalization of the military. In the early 1890s, President Carlos Ezeta opened a military hospital in San Salvador and a non-commissioned officer school. Besides a war with Guatemala in 1906, the military's focus was on internal security. In 1912 the National Guard (Guardia Nacional, GN) was established to provide security at coffee estates. Around that time, President Manuel Enrique Araujo created a general staff, education corps, and army reserve system, and in 1922 the Salvadoran Air Force was established.

=== La Matanza ===
In 1903 General Tomás Regalada presided over a peaceful transition of power to his selected successor, Pedro José Escalón, and politics remained relatively stable until the early 1930s. During the Great Depression, coffee prices fell, the wages of indigenous Salvadoran workers were cut and unemployment was widespread. For three days in 1932, the indigenous workers rebelled. President General Maximiliano Hernández Martínez responded with force. Under his command, the national army proper, slaughtered up to 40,000 peasants.

=== Palm Sunday coup ===
Twelve years of autocratic rule followed. Martínez withheld democratic and civil rights. On 2 March 1944, a Palm Sunday, the landowners, intellectuals, students and also some sections of the Salvadoran armed forces rebelled. The First Infantry Regiment and the Second Artillery Regiment of San Salvador joined the rebels as did the Garrison of Santa Ana. Santa Ana was bombed from the air. The rebellion was put down by the remaining loyal sections of the military. Reprisals of torture and execution of those who had joined the rebellion followed. Martial law was put in place. However, in May 1944, non-violent protest leading to a general strike caused Martínez to fall from power.

=== Rebellion of 1948 ===
During the years that followed, young military officers became increasingly dissatisfied with their situation. They saw the generals clinging to senior posts for which they had little training and without making way for the younger officers. They saw the generals failing to prepare for the social and economic changes coming to Central America. They objected to unfair disciplinary measures and unfair surveillance. In 1948, fighting broke out between the younger officers and troops under their command and the senior generals and the police force under their command. The president, Salvador Castaneda Castro was imprisoned. Senior officers and politicians were dismissed. The new government promoted the formation of a truly national, apolitical and professional army in El Salvador.

=== American influence and the Cold War ===
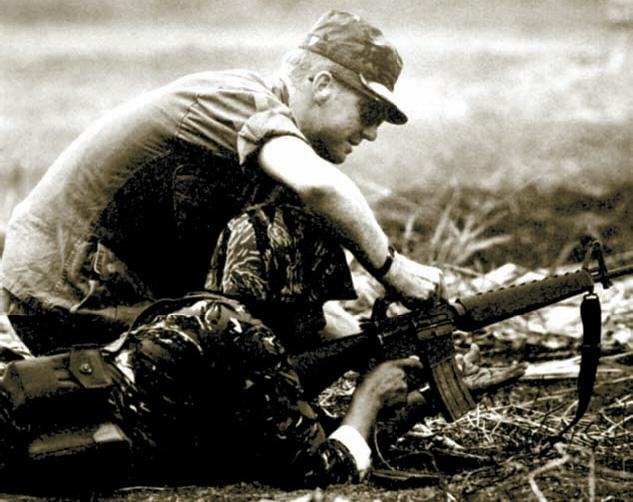
"SFC Gregory A. Fronius, shown here training a Salvadoran soldier in marksmanship, was later killed in a FMLN raid."

From 1947 to 1953, El Salvador held an agreement with the US whereby an American military aviation mission would be sent to El Salvador; El Salvador would seek advice from the US preferentially and purchase arms from the US. Some Salvadoran military officers were trained in North America and the Panama Canal Zone. Nevertheless, the amount of American military aid purchased by El Salvador in the 1950s was small; just enough in munitions and light arms to suppress internal conflict such as communist activity.

In the 1950s, Salvadoran men underwent one year of national service before being discharged to a reserve army. They then underwent further training on a regular basis and could be called to join active provincial patrols (patrullas cantonalles). Regular meetings of the men were held reinforcing loyalty to the nation and opposition to communism. Men from disadvantaged circumstances were offered monetary and practical assistance and education for their children. The number of reservists grew to approximately 40,000.

In the 1960s, a junta of conservative military officers and landowners took power in a coup and then organised elections. In 1961, the junta's candidate Lieutenant Colonel Julio Adalberto Rivera was elected president. In 1967, Colonel Fidel Sanchez Hernandez became president.

=== Football War ===
In 1969, tensions between El Salvador and Honduras increased. There was dispute concerning the border between the two countries. Approximately 300,000 Salvadorans had moved to Honduras due to population and land pressures in their homeland but Honduras had not renewed the El Salvador – Honduras Bilateral Treaty on Immigration. Honduras and El Salvador were competitors in the Central American Common Market. Honduras' economy was struggling and the Honduran Government started to deport the Salvadorans who they saw as illegal immigrants. Many Salvadorans fled after their Vice Consul was killed. In June 1969, El Salvador played three games against Honduras in the qualifying rounds of the World Cup. Then, on 26 June 1969, El Salvador won a play-off game 3 goals to 2 against Haiti, taking a place in the cup finals.

On 14 July 1969, armed hostilities began between El Salvador and Honduras. Due to the war's proximity to the World Cup qualifying games, it was called the "Football War" or the "Soccer War".

At this time, the Salvadoran forces included approximately 8,000 infantrymen with rifles, machine guns, mortars and bazookas, 105 mm cannons and a few armoured personnel carriers. Very few arms were manufactured in El Salvador. Most arms were supplied by the US. Honduras' infantry was smaller and less well equipped.

The Salvadoran Air Force, flying P-51 Mustangs, attacked Honduran targets and vice versa, but each air force had only a few working aeroplanes and was hampered by a lack of spare parts. El Salvador's infantry forces invaded Honduras and took Ocotepeque.

As Salvadoran troops approached Tegucigalpa, their supply lines failed, they became exhausted and were slowed by heavy rainfall, and their morale fell. On July 18, 1969, the Organization of American States (OAS) organised a ceasefire. Then as economic sanctions and an arms embargo took effect, both sides. The war lasted for four days and therefore is also called the "one hundred hour war".

=== Civil War ===
The Salvadoran Civil War was fought between 1979 and 1992. The Salvadoran armed forces fought the Frente Farabundo Marti para la Liberacion Nacional (FMLN), a coalition of insurgent guerrilla groups. The war began when a reformist government was suppressed by hard line military elements and by landowners.

Between 1980 and 1983, the Salvadoran armed forces were driven out of territory controlled by large FMLN groups in rural areas. The FMLN membership later increased to over 12,000 when the organization was able to provide local governance and services. The government responded with counter-insurgency actions including the assassination of the archbishop, Óscar Romero.

In late 1981, soldiers of the national armed forces' Atlácatl Battalion, a rapid response troop, killed 900 civilians at El Mozote. This was one of a number of actions including rapes, bashings, torture and killings. Men of this battalion were graduates of the US School of the Americas at Fort Benning, Columbus, Georgia. Another atrocity occurred on 16 November 1989. Army soldiers murdered six Jesuit priests, their housekeeper and her daughter at the Central American University.

In 1989, the armed forces of El Salvador had raised 56,000 fighting men with 63 aeroplanes and 72 helicopters. Between 1983 and 1987, El Salvador's military forces received over 100 million dollars per year from the US.

In 1990, at the end of the Cold War, the US restricted funding to the Salvadoran military. The US found its rigorous measures against left wing groups were no longer needed. This and the lack of advantage on either side led to the end of the war in 1992.

Under the terms of the Chapultepec Peace Accords which had been signed on 16 January 1992 in Chapultepec, Mexico, the Salvadoran Armed Forces was to be subordinated and removed from the political arena. The Ministry of Defense handed the role of internal security to a new body, the National Police Force. The number of soldiers in the Armed Forces was reduced by half. Counter-insurgency forces were demobilised. Military intelligence units reported directly to the president. The constitutional mission, doctrine and recruitment and educational systems of the Armed Forces were redefined.

During the civil war, military and right wing paramilitary death squads used exemplary violence with murder and mutilation, massacre and forced displacement to gain control of the populace. In 1993, a General Amnesty Law was passed by the Salvadoran government. Victims of human rights violations had no redress. International human rights entities such as the UNHCR made formal objections to the law. Spain found jurisdiction in the matter and indicted twenty retired soldiers who were officers at the time of the killings.

For many reasons, the armed forces resisted the application of the requirement of the Peace Accord. Junior officers who had volunteered to work in security units did not want to be treated as raw army recruits when their units disbanded. Senior officers feared the autonomy of the military's core activities, such as training, would be lost. Military leaders feared that the loss of military units in rural areas would lead to social and political unrest. The civilian population feared that officers purged from military ranks for human rights violations would join right wing paramilitary organisations.

=== Post civil war ===
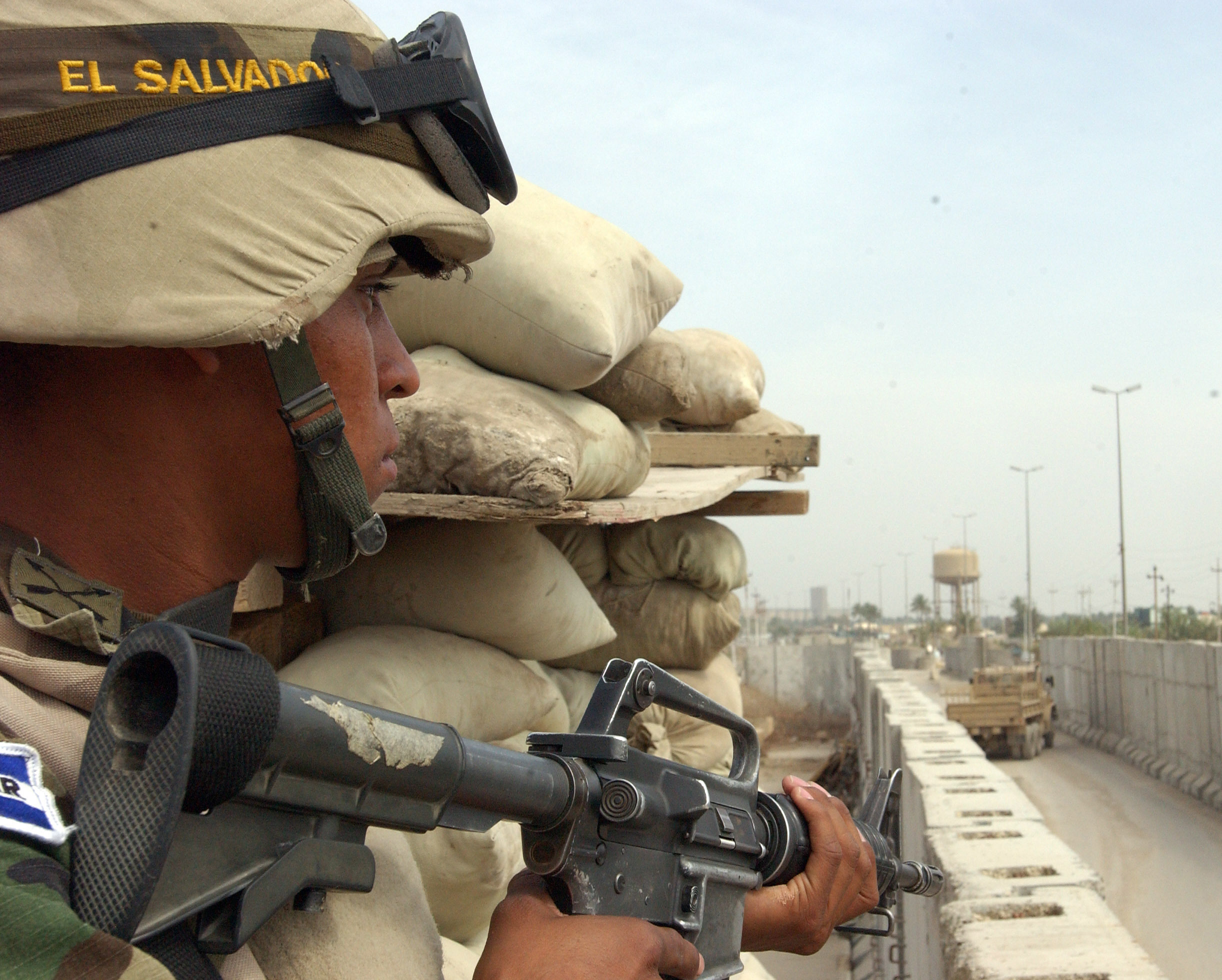
A Salvadoran Cuscatlán Battalion soldier in Camp Charlie in Al Hillah, Iraq, April 14, 2005

From 2003 to January 2009, the Salvadoran Cuscatlán Battalion was a part of the Multi-National Force – Iraq. El Salvador deployed more than 500 troops, mostly paratroopers and special forces. During the conflict, five Salvadoran soldiers were killed in action and more than 50 were wounded. Salvadoran forces operated next to the Spanish Legion and the U.S. Army. They were well regarded by both Spanish and U.S. forces. The last of the Salvadoran forces withdrew from Iraq in 2009. They were the last Central Americans allies to withdraw from the conflict.

In 2016, a new armed force was raised in El Salvador with the remit of stopping criminal gangs (especially MS-13) and narcotrafficking.

In 2021, the strength of the Salvadoran armed forces was estimated to be 24,500 active personnel.

=== Crackdown on gangs ===
Beginning on 25 March 2022, three days of gang-related violence occurred that left 87 people dead. In response, President Bukele asked the Salvadoran parliament to ratify a state of emergency. On 26 March, Bukele also ordered the police and army to initiate mass-arrests against those responsible for the violence.

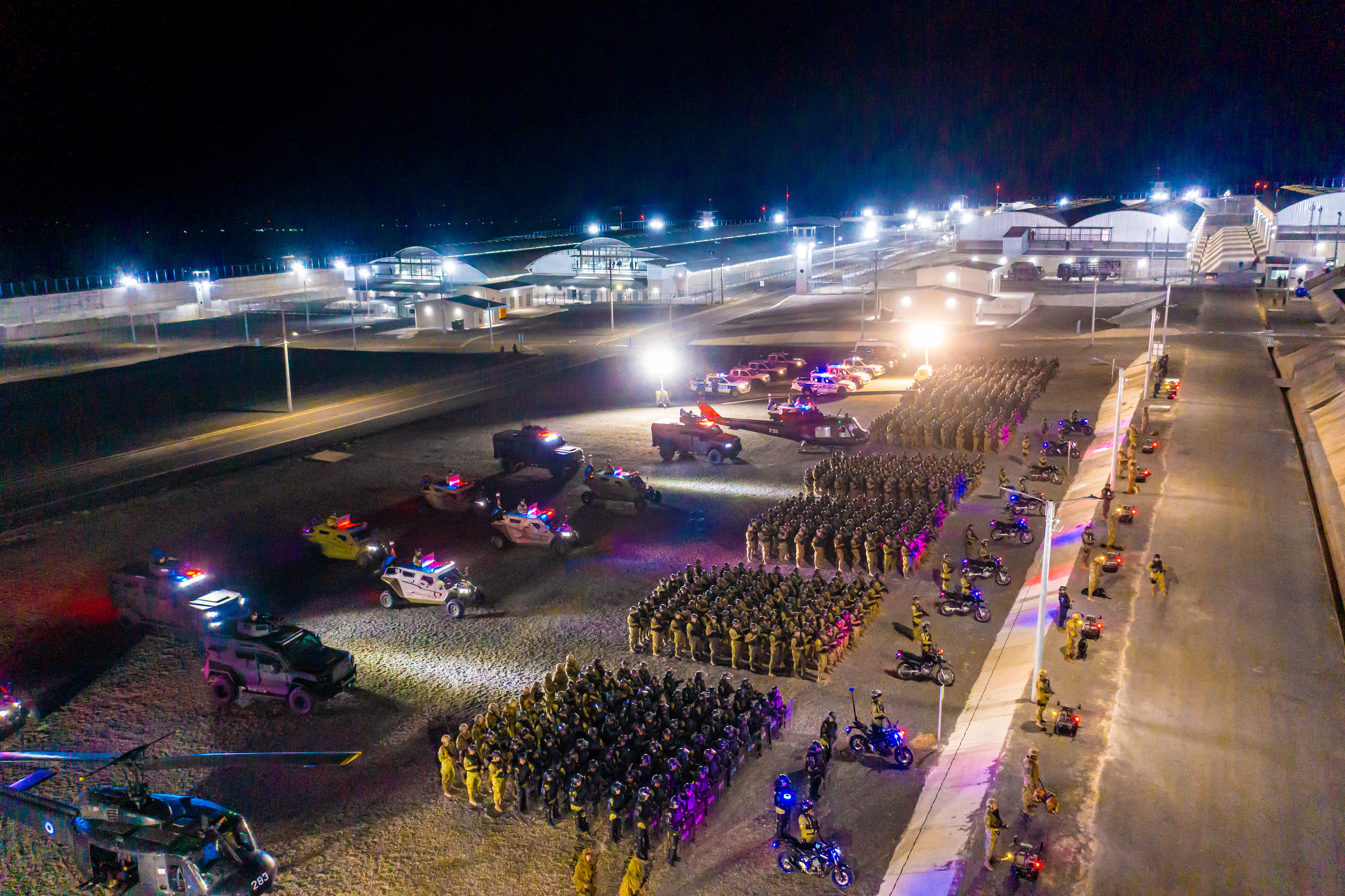
Soldiers and police officers

A day later, the Legislative Assembly approved a state of emergency that gives legal coverage to arrest any citizen suspected to be a gang member even with no proof. In addition, Congress also approved reforms to increase the maximum sentence for gang member from nine to 45 years in prison and punish the dissemination of gang messages, including independent journalism talking about the gang crisis, with up to 15 years in prison.

The law was directed against those who "mark" their territories with acronyms of the gangs, a practice that gang members use to intimidate, and threaten with death those who denounce them to the authorities. The Directorate of Penal Centers began to erase the graffiti that the gangs use to mark the territory in which they operate.

The Mara Salvatrucha (MS-13) and Barrio 18 gangs, among others, were estimated in 2022 to have around some 70,000 members, and as of August 2023, around 72,000 people have been sent to prison as a part of the government crackdown on the gangs.

== Structure ==
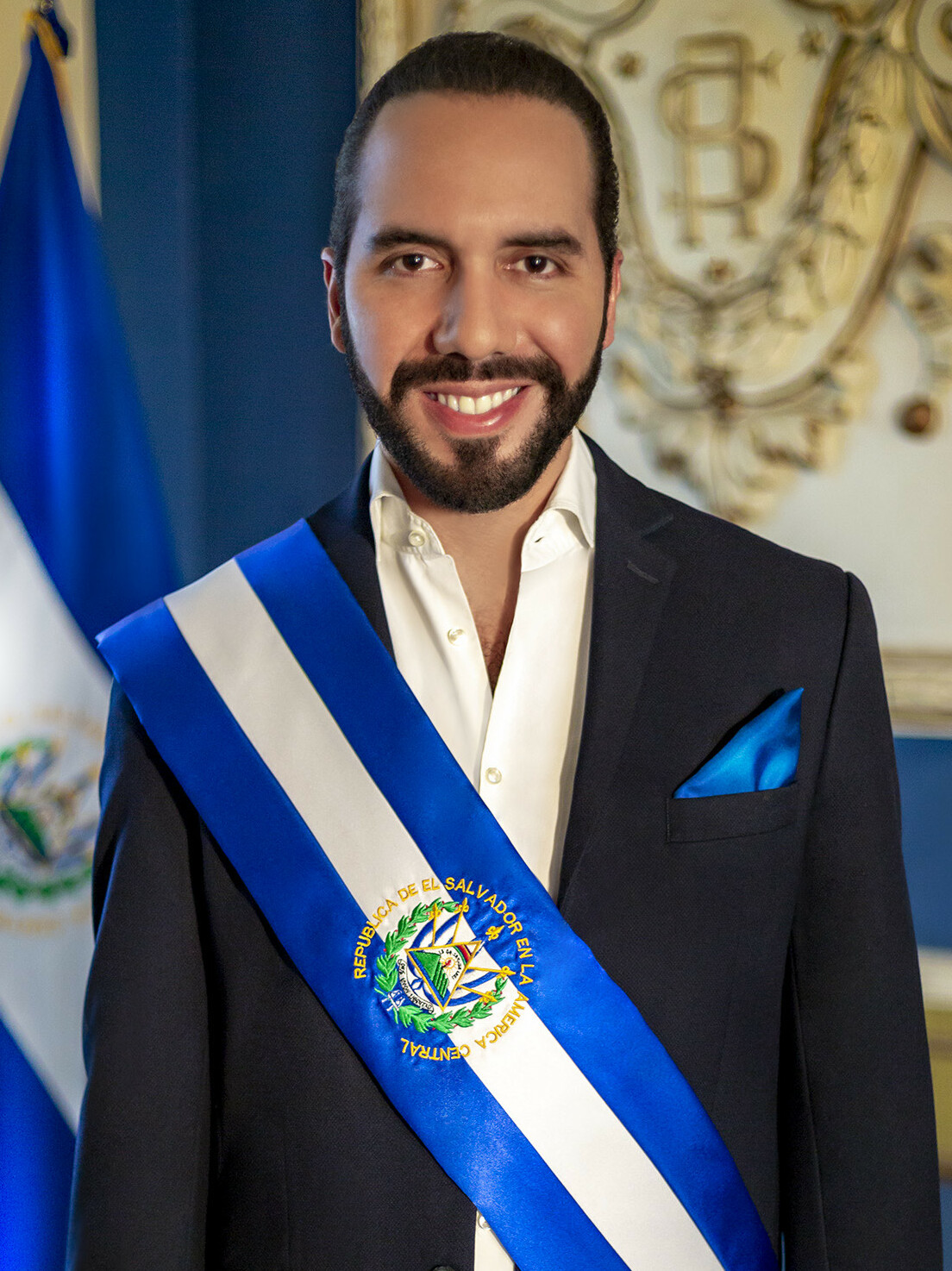
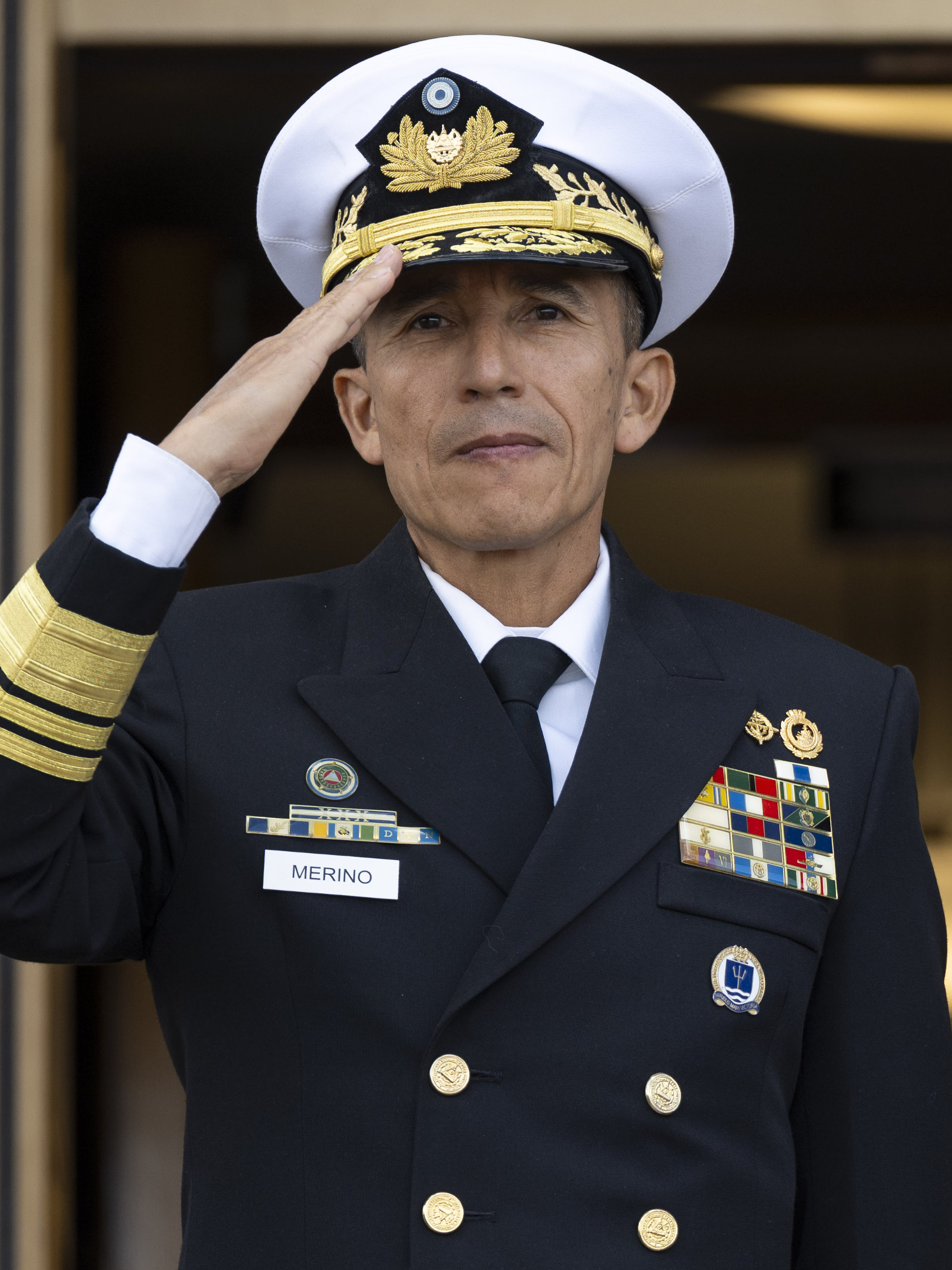
Commander-in-Chief President Nayib Bukele (left) and Minister of National Defense Vice Admiral René Merino Monroy (right)

The Salvadoran armed forces are a combat force composed of army, navy and air force each led by their Chief of the Joint Staff. The support units are a military education and doctrine command, a logistics support command, a military health command, a military special security brigade and a directorate general of recruitment and reserves.

The duties of the Salvadoran Armed Force is described in articles 211 and 212 of the Constitution of 1983. It is the duty of the armed forces to defend national territory and sovereignty; maintain public peace, tranquillity, and security; and to support democracy. Article 212 describes the armed forces as a 'fundamental institution for national security, of a permanent character, apolitical, obedient to established civilian authority, and non-deliberative". It also charges the military with enforcing the no-reelection provision of the country's president; with guaranteeing universal suffrage, human rights;and with working with the executive branch of government in promoting national development

The Commander in Chief of the Armed Forces is the president. Reporting to the president is the Ministry of Defence. Members of the ministry advise the Secretary of State and the Joint Chiefs of Staff. The military provides a panel composed of the Chiefs of the General Staff and military experts who provide the ministry with technical advice for policy making and strategic planning. Oversight of the military is provided by the Assistant Inspector General of the Armed Forces.

Within the military leadership are operating units, tactical units and advisory bodies. The operating units build on operational plans. The tactical units include detachments, training centers and forces of the army at the battalion level. The combat recognition and transport groups make up the Air Force tactical unit. The Navy uses transport and hydrographic tactical units.

== Medals ==
Among the highest military decorations in the Salvadoran Armed Forces are the Gold Cross of War Heroism in Action; the Silver Cross of Heroism; the gold medal for Courage in Action; and the Silver Medal of Valor. for such actions, there may be a monetary payment in addition to the armed forces pension. There are other honours for field service, distinguished service, and merit.

== See also ==
- Captain General Gerardo Barrios Military School
- Captain Guillermo Reynaldo Cortez Military Aviation School

== Works cited ==
- Haggerty, Richard A., ed. (1990). El Salvador: A Country Study. Washington, D.C.: Federal Research Division, Library of Congress. LCCN 89048948.
- International Institute for Strategic Studies (2024). The Military Balance 2024. London: Routledge. ISBN 978-1-032-78004-7.
