= List of elections in 1939 =

The following elections occurred in the year 1939.

== Africa ==
- 1939 Liberian general election
- 1939 Southern Rhodesian general election

== Asia ==
- 1939 Dutch East Indies Volksraad election
- 1939 Iranian legislative election
- 1939 Iraqi parliamentary election
- 1939 Saudi Arabian municipal elections
- 1939 Turkish general election
- 1939 Turkish presidential election

== Europe ==
- 1939 Belgian general election
- 1939 Bulgarian parliamentary election
- 1939 Danish Folketing election
- 1939 Danish Landsting election
- 1939 Danish constitutional referendum
- 1939 Finnish parliamentary election
- 1939 Hungarian parliamentary election
- 1939 conclave
- 1939 Romanian general election
- 1939 Swiss federal election
- 1939 Swiss referendums
- 1939 Turkish general election
- 1939 Turkish presidential election

=== Liechtenstein ===
- 1939 Liechtenstein general election
- 1939 Liechtenstein local elections

=== United Kingdom ===
- 1939 Ashton-under-Lyne by-election
- 1939 Batley and Morley by-election
- 1939 Clackmannan and Eastern Stirlingshire by-election
- 1939 East Norfolk by-election
- 1939 Fareham by-election
- 1939 High Peak by-election
- 1939 Hythe by-election
- 1939 Kennington by-election
- 1939 Monmouth by-election
- 1939 North Cornwall by-election
- 1939 Portsmouth South by-election
- 1939 Ripon by-election
- 1939 Southwark North by-election
- 1939 Streatham by-election
- 1939 Wells by-election
- 1939 Westminster Abbey by-election

== North America ==
- 1939 Honduran presidential election

=== Canada ===
- 1939 Edmonton municipal election
- 1939 New Brunswick general election
- 1939 Ottawa municipal election
- 1939 Prince Edward Island general election
- 1939 Quebec general election
- 1939 Toronto municipal election

=== El Salvador ===
- 1939 Salvadoran Constitutional Assembly election
- 1939 Salvadoran presidential election

=== United States ===
==== United States lieutenant gubernatorial ====
- 1939 Mississippi lieutenant gubernatorial election

==== United States gubernatorial ====
- 1939 Kentucky gubernatorial election
- 1939 Mississippi gubernatorial election
- 1939 United States gubernatorial elections

==== United States House of Representatives ====
- 1939 United States House of Representatives elections

==== United States mayoral elections ====
- 1939 Baltimore mayoral election
- 1939 Chicago mayoral election
- 1939 Cleveland mayoral election
- 1939 Hartford, Connecticut mayoral election
- 1939 Manchester, New Hampshire mayoral election
- 1939 Philadelphia mayoral election
- 1939 San Diego mayoral election
- 1939 San Francisco mayoral election
- 1939 Springfield mayoral election

== Oceania ==
=== Australia ===
- 1939 Balmain state by-election
- 1939 Griffith by-election
- 1939 Hawthorn state by-election
- 1939 Hurstville state by-election
- 1939 Upper Hunter state by-election
- 1939 Waverley state by-election
- 1939 Western Australian state election
- 1939 Wilmot by-election

== See also ==
- Category:1939 elections
