= 1939 in El Salvador =

- Decades: 1910s; 1920s; 1930s; 1940s; 1950s
- See also: Other events of 1939; Timeline of Salvadoran history

The following lists events that happened in 1939 in El Salvador.

== Incumbents ==
- President: Maximiliano Hernández Martínez
- Vice President: Vacant

== Events ==
=== January ===
- 3 January – Voters in El Salvador voted Maximiliano Hernández Martínez as President of El Salvador for a second term with 210,810 votes in a 100% margin. He was the only candidate. The 1939 Salvadoran Constitutional Assembly election also occurred and the National Pro Patria Party won all 42 seats.

=== September ===
- 18 September – C.D. Dragón, a Salvadoran football club, was established.
