= 1945 in El Salvador =

- Decades: 1920s; 1930s; 1940s; 1950s; 1960s
- See also: Other events of 1945; Timeline of Salvadoran history

The following lists events that happened in 1945 in El Salvador.

== Incumbents ==
- President: Osmín Aguirre y Salinas (until 1 March), Salvador Castaneda Castro (starting 1 March)
- Vice President: Vacant (until 1 March), Manuel Adriano Vilanova (starting 1 March)

== Events ==
=== January ===
- 14–16 January – Voters in El Salvador voted Salvador Castaneda Castro as President of El Salvador with 312,754 votes in a 99.70% margin. Osmín Aguirre y Salinas heavily rigged the election in favor of Castaneda Castro.

=== March ===
- 1 March – Social Democratic Unification Party candidate Salvador Castaneda Castro was sworn in as President of El Salvador. Manuel Adriano Vilanova was sworn in as Vice President.

=== August ===
- 20 August – C.D. Once Municipal, a Salvadoran soccer team, was established.

=== Undated ===
- The National Pro Patria Party was dissolved.
- San Juan Tepezontes was incorporated as a municipality.
