= 1935 in El Salvador =

- Decades: 1910s; 1920s; 1930s; 1940s; 1950s
- See also: Other events of 1935; Timeline of Salvadoran history

The following lists events that happened in 1935 in El Salvador.

== Incumbents ==
- President: Andrés Ignacio Menéndez (until 1 March), Maximiliano Hernández Martínez (starting 1 March)
- Vice President: Vacant

== Events ==
=== January ===
- 13–15 January – Voters in El Salvador voted Maximiliano Hernández Martínez as President of El Salvador with 329,555 votes in a 100% margin. He was the only candidate.

=== March ===
- 1 March – National Pro Patria Party candidate Maximiliano Hernández Martínez was sworn in as President of El Salvador.
- 16 March – Maximiliano Hernández Martínez opened the 1935 Central American and Caribbean Games in San Salvador.

=== April ===
- 5 April – The 1935 Central American and Caribbean Games concluded. El Salvador won 18 medals: 4 gold, 4 silver, and 10 bronze.
- 26 April – The Salvadoran Football Federation was established.

== Deaths ==
- 10 December – Pío Romero Bosque, politician (b. 1860)
