= 1944 in El Salvador =

- Decades: 1920s; 1930s; 1940s; 1950s; 1960s
- See also: Other events of 1944; Timeline of Salvadoran history

The following lists events that happened in 1944 in El Salvador.

== Incumbents ==
- President: Maximiliano Hernández Martínez (until 9 May), Andrés Ignacio Menéndez (9 May – 21 October), Osmín Aguirre y Salinas (starting 21 October)
- Vice President: Vacant

== Events ==
=== January ===
- 3 January – Voters in El Salvador voted Maximiliano Hernández Martínez as President of El Salvador for a third term in a 100% margin but to results were published. He was the only candidate. The 1944 Salvadoran Constitutional Assembly election also but no results were posted either.

=== April ===
- 2 April – Rouge military units rebelled against President Maximiliano Hernández Martínez.
- 4 April – The rebellion was suppressed and more than 100 civilians were shot dead in street demonstrations by the army.

=== May ===
- 7 May – The Strike of Fallen Arms began against Hernández Martínez's government.
- 9 May – Maximiliano Hernández Martínez resigned and fled to Guatemala. Andrés Ignacio Menéndez became Provisional President.
- 11 May – The Strike of Fallen Arms ends.

=== November ===
- 21 October – Osmín Aguirre y Salinas deposed Andrés Ignacio Menéndez in a coup and became Provisional President.

== Births ==
- 22 March – Octavio Ortiz, Catholic priest (d. 1979)
- 18 June – Salvador Sánchez Cerén, politician
