= 1948 in El Salvador =

- Decades: 1920s; 1930s; 1940s; 1950s; 1960s
- See also: Other events of 1948; Timeline of Salvadoran history

The following lists events that happened in 1948 in El Salvador.

== Incumbents ==
- President: Salvador Castaneda Castro (until 14 December), Revolutionary Council of Government (starting 14 December 14)
- Vice President: Manuel Adriano Vilanova(until 14 December), Vacant (starting 14 December)

== Events ==
=== February ===
- 14 December – President Salvador Castaneda Castro was deposed in a military coup d'état. The Revolutionary Council of Government was established.

=== March ===
- 2 March – C.D. Sonsonate, a Salvadoran football club, was established.

=== Undated ===
- C.D. Audaz, a Salvadoran football club, was established.

== Births ==
- 24 June – Armando Calderón Sol, politician (d. 2017)
