= 1936 in El Salvador =

- Decades: 1910s; 1920s; 1930s; 1940s; 1950s
- See also: Other events of 1936; Timeline of Salvadoran history

The following lists events that happened in 1936 in El Salvador.

== Incumbents ==
- President: Maximiliano Hernández Martínez
- Vice President: Vacant

== Events ==
=== January ===
- January – The 1936 Salvadoran legislative election was held but no election results were posted.

=== May ===
- May 2 – El Diario de Hoy newspaper began publication.
