= 1947 in El Salvador =

- Decades: 1920s; 1930s; 1940s; 1950s; 1960s
- See also: Other events of 1947; Timeline of Salvadoran history

The following lists events that happened in 1947 in El Salvador.

== Incumbents ==
- President: Salvador Castaneda Castro
- Vice President: Manuel Adriano Vilanova

== Events ==
=== February ===
- 16 February – C.D. FAS, a Salvadoran football club, was established.

== Births ==
- 22 November – Alfredo Cristiani, politician
