= 1934 in El Salvador =

- Decades: 1910s; 1920s; 1930s; 1940s; 1950s
- See also: Other events of 1934; Timeline of Salvadoran history

The following lists events that happened in 1934 in El Salvador.

== Incumbents ==
- President: Maximiliano Hernández Martínez (until 28 August), Andrés Ignacio Menéndez (starting 28 August)
- Vice President: Vacant

== Events ==
=== June ===
- 19 June – Central Reserve Bank of El Salvador was established.

=== August ===
- 28 August – Maximiliano Hernández Martínez resigned as President in order to run in the 1935 Salvadoran presidential election. Andrés Ignacio Menéndez became Provisional President.
