= Cuscatlán Bridge =

Cuscatlán Bridge may refer to one of two bridges:

- Cuscatlán Bridge (1942)
- Cuscatlán Bridge (1998)
