= 1942 in El Salvador =

- Decades: 1920s; 1930s; 1940s; 1950s; 1960s
- See also: Other events of 1942; Timeline of Salvadoran history

The following lists events that happened in 1942 in El Salvador.

== Incumbents ==
- President: Maximiliano Hernández Martínez
- Vice President: Vacant

== Events ==
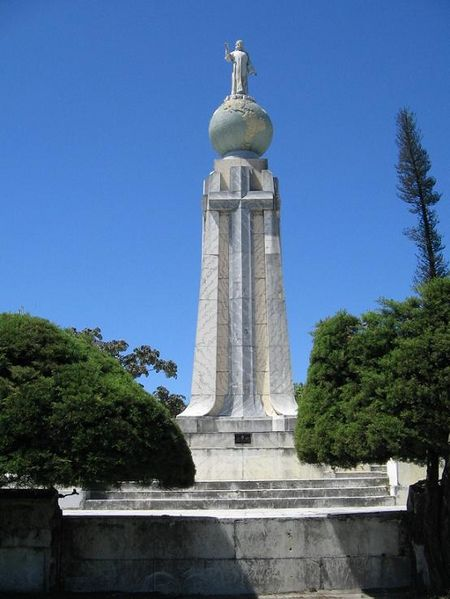
Monumento al Divino Salvador del Mundo.

=== June ===
- 6 June – The Cuscatlán Bridge was opened by President Maximiliano Hernández Martínez.

=== August ===
- 6 August – The 1942 Guatemala earthquake was felt in El Salvador.

=== November ===
- 26 November – El Monumento al Divino Salvador del Mundo was constructed in San Salvador. It remains one of the most iconic sites in El Salvor.
