= 1937 in El Salvador =

- Decades: 1910s; 1920s; 1930s; 1940s; 1950s
- See also: Other events of 1937; Timeline of Salvadoran history

The following lists events that happened in 1937 in El Salvador.

== Incumbents ==
- President: Maximiliano Hernández Martínez
- Vice President: Vacant
