= 1940 in El Salvador =

- Decades: 1920s; 1930s; 1940s; 1950s; 1960s
- See also: Other events of 1940; Timeline of Salvadoran history

The following lists events that happened in 1940 in El Salvador.

== Incumbents ==
- President: Maximiliano Hernández Martínez
- Vice President: Vacant

== Events ==
=== August ===
- 30 August – España F.C., a Salvadoran football club, was established.
