= 1938 in El Salvador =

- Decades: 1910s; 1920s; 1930s; 1940s; 1950s
- See also: Other events of 1938; Timeline of Salvadoran history

The following lists events that happened in 1938 in El Salvador.

== Incumbents ==
- President: Maximiliano Hernández Martínez
- Vice President: Vacant

== Events ==
=== April ===
- 24 April – Eberhardt Bohnstedt, a Wehrmacht general, was appointed as director of the Salvadoran military school.
