= Cuscatlán Bridge (1998) =

Bridge across the Lempa River

Cuscatlán Bridge Puente Cuscatlán
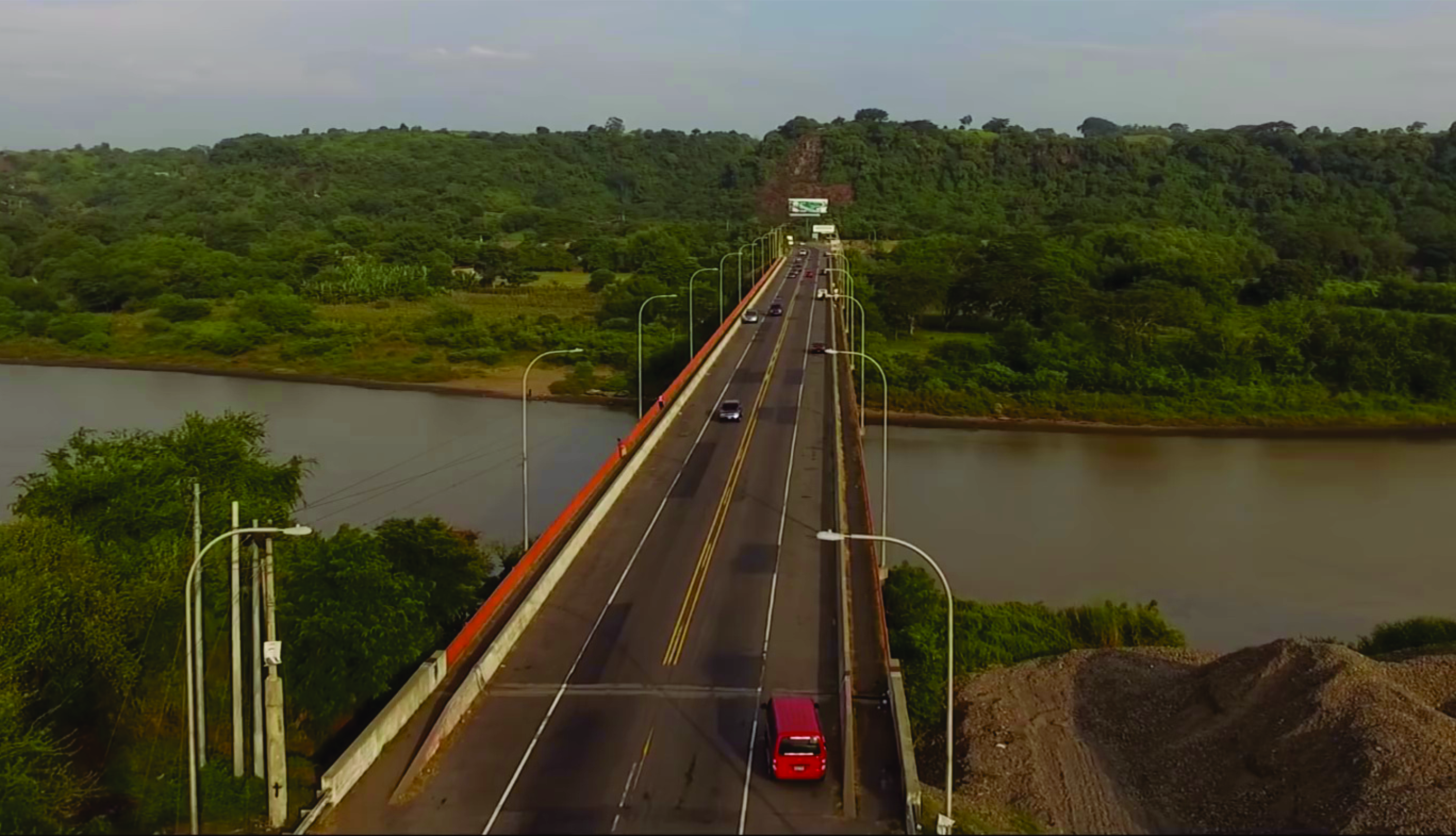
- The Cuscatlán Bridge crossing the Lempa River
- Coordinates: 13°36′39″N 88°34′02″W
- Carries: Pan-American Highway
- Crosses: Lempa River
- Locale: Condadillo, Estanzuelas; El Quebracho, San Ildefonso

Characteristics
- Total length: 1,348 feet (411 m)

History
- Constructed by: Rizzani de Eccher
- Inaugurated: 1998
- Replaces: Cuscatlán Bridge

Location
- Interactive map of Cuscatlán Bridge

The Cuscatlán Bridge (Spanish: Puente Cuscatlán) is a bridge in El Salvador that crosses the Lempa River. The bridge, opened in 1998, replaces a previous bridge of the name that was bombed during the Salvadoran Civil War in 1984.

== History ==
In 1942, the Salvadoran government inaugurated the original Cuscatlán Bridge that crossed the Lempa River. On 1 February 1984, the Farabundo Martí National Liberation Front (FMLN) bombed and destroyed the bridge during the Salvadoran Civil War, isolating eastern El Salvador from the rest of the country. The Ministry of Public Works built a temporary ford across the river to allow continued access to eastern El Salvador.

In 1998, the Salvadoran government inaugurated a new Cuscatlán Bridge. The new bridge is 1,348 feet (411 m) long. It was built by the Italian construction firm Rizzani de Eccher and received funding from the Japanese government. The bridge cost US$9 million (188 million colones) to build.
