= 1941 in El Salvador =

- Decades: 1920s; 1930s; 1940s; 1950s; 1960s
- See also: Other events of 1941; Timeline of Salvadoran history

The following lists events that happened in 1941 in El Salvador.

== Incumbents ==
- President: Maximiliano Hernández Martínez
- Vice President: Vacant

== Events ==
=== December ===
- 8 December – El Salvador declared war on the Axis powers in World War II following the Bombing of Pearl Harbor and joined the Allied Powers.

=== Undated ===
- España F.C., a Salvadoran football club, was disestablished.

== Births ==
- Napoleón Herson Calitto, commanding officer (died 1984)
