= Nueva Granada, El Salvador =

Coordinates: 13°36′N 88°27′W

Nueva Granada is a municipality in the Usulután Department of El Salvador. According to the official census of 2007, it has a population of 7,451 inhabitants.

== History ==
Nueva Granada stands for New Granada, and it was founded in 1854. Nueva Granada's jurisdiction resulted in the incorporation of the estate of the Nuevo Carrizal, which stands for New Reedbed.

On April 24, 1907, the National Legislative Assembly issued a legislative decree that segregated from the jurisdiction of Estanzuelas, the Gualcho, and Jocomontique estates. These estates were annexed to El Triunfo estate, which stands for "Triumph." The decree included the demarcation line between Gualcho and Jocomontique populations, which was determined by the Official Engineer appointed by the government to separate the lands of the Jocomontique estate from the common lands of Estanzuelas. This Decree was sanctioned by the president, Fernando Figueroa on May 4.

At the beginning of the 20th century, Nueva Granada petitioned the Salvadorian Government for recognition as a town, which petition was granted. On May 15, 1907, the National Legislative Assembly issued a legislative decree that built the El Carrizal hamlet in town, with the name of Nueva Granada; This was segregated from the jurisdiction of El Triunfo. The decree was sanctioned by President Figueroa on the following day, May 16.

The executive decree that specified the jurisdictional limits of the town was issued on August 26, 1907; its limits were: to the east, with the Los Zapotes or El Triunfo ravine, in its entirety from south to north; to the north, with lands of the Gualcho and Jocomontique estates from east to west until reaching a dry ravine called El Aguacate or "Lepaso"; to the west, through this same ravine upstream, until reaching a point called Rincón de Mariano Ayala and Esteban Bermúdez, and from there, in a straight line and to the south, until finding the local road that leads from El Triunfo to Mercedes Umaña; and to the south, along the same road, in all its extension, from west to east until the ravine of los Zapotes or El Triunfo. The same decree of August 26 marked the first Sunday of September for the Municipality of the town of El Triunfo to proceed with the election of a mayor, two councilors and a trustee who formed the municipality of Nueva Granada.

In the year 1916 the Gualcho farm and the Jocomontique farm were annexed to the municipality. Nueva Granada acquired the title of town on August 25, 1955.
