= 1949 in El Salvador =

- Decades: 1920s; 1930s; 1940s; 1950s; 1960s
- See also: Other events of 1949; Timeline of Salvadoran history

The following lists events that happened in 1949 in El Salvador.

== Incumbents ==
- President: Revolutionary Council of Government
- Vice President: Vacant

== Events ==
=== September ===
- 11 September – Municipal Limeño, a Salvadoran football club, was established.
