= 1936 Salvadoran legislative election =

- January 1936
- All 42 seats in the Legislative Assembly; 22 seats needed for a majority
Party	Leader	Vote %	Seats	+/–
Pro Patria	Maximiliano Hernández Martínez	100	42	
This lists parties that won seats. See the complete results below.
President of the National Assembly before	President of the National Assembly after
César Cierra; Pro Patria	César Cierra; Pro Patria

Legislative elections were held in El Salvador in January 1936. However, no results were published.

== Elected Members ==
Department	Deputy	Political affiliation
San Salvador	Eusebio Argueta	National Pro Patria Party
San Salvador	Francisco Bertrand Galindo	National Pro Patria Party
San Salvador	Joaquín Vargas	National Pro Patria Party
San Ana	Arturo Acevedo	National Pro Patria Party
San Ana	José Lucio Martínez	National Pro Patria Party
San Ana	Miguel Ángel Menéndez	National Pro Patria Party
Chalatenango	Héctor Fajardo Rivas	National Pro Patria Party
Chalatenango	Manuel Basilio Escobar	National Pro Patria Party
Chalatenango	Marcos Esteban Santos	National Pro Patria Party
Sonsonate	Juan Antonio Arce	National Pro Patria Party
Sonsonate	Ricardo Machón Villanova	National Pro Patria Party
Sonsonate	Juan Brannon	National Pro Patria Party
Cuscatlán	Héctor Infante	National Pro Patria Party
Cuscatlán	Alfredo Díaz Nuila	National Pro Patria Party
Cuscatlán	José Maximiliano Díaz	National Pro Patria Party
Ahuachapán	Rafael Alfonso Rivas	National Pro Patria Party
Ahuachapán	Alfonso Borja Morán	National Pro Patria Party
Ahuachapán	Juan Padilla	National Pro Patria Party
La Paz	Manuel de Jesús Varela	National Pro Patria Party
La Paz	Andrés Alfaro	National Pro Patria Party
La Paz	Julio Sosa	National Pro Patria Party
La Libertad	Manuel José Iraheta	National Pro Patria Party
La Libertad	José Gavidia	National Pro Patria Party
La Libertad	Jorge Sotero Argueta	National Pro Patria Party
Cabañas	José Bruno Velasco	National Pro Patria Party
Cabañas	Magdaleno Abarca	National Pro Patria Party
Cabañas	Daniel Antonio Bonilla	National Pro Patria Party
La Unión	César Cierra	National Pro Patria Party
La Unión	Francisco Federico Reyes	National Pro Patria Party
La Unión	Julio Cañas	National Pro Patria Party
San Vicente	José Basilio Merino	National Pro Patria Party
San Vicente	Gustavo Acevedo Aguilar	National Pro Patria Party
San Vicente	Marcial Vela	National Pro Patria Party
Morazán	David Turcios	National Pro Patria Party
Morazán	Santiago Mata	National Pro Patria Party
Morazán	Jerónimo Quesada	National Pro Patria Party
Usulután	Manuel Quijano Hernández	National Pro Patria Party
Usulután	Amílcar Ávila	National Pro Patria Party
Usulután	Tomás Manuel Jovel	National Pro Patria Party
San Miguel	Bernardo García Prieto	National Pro Patria Party
San Miguel	José Erasmo Pacheco	National Pro Patria Party
San Miguel	Julio Arango	National Pro Patria Party

== Bibliography ==
- Political Handbook of the world, 1936 New York, 1937.
