= Cuscatlán Bridge (1942) =

Former suspension bridge across the Lempa River

Cuscatlán Bridge Puente Cuscatlán
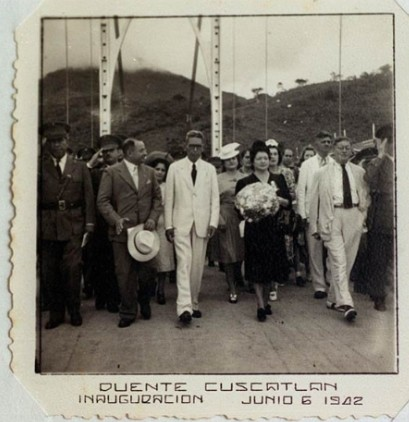
- President Maximiliano Hernández Martínez at the inauguration of the Cuscatlán Bridge
- Coordinates: 13°37′02″N 88°33′54″W
- Carried: Pan-American Highway
- Crossed: Lempa River
- Locale: Condadillo, Estanzuelas; El Quebracho, San Ildefonso

Characteristics
- Design: Suspension bridge
- Material: Volcanic ash, stone
- Total length: 1,350 feet (410 m)
- Longest span: 820 feet (250 m)

History
- Inaugurated: 6 June 1942
- Collapsed: 1 January 1984
- Replaced by: Cuscatlán Bridge

The Cuscatlán Bridge (Spanish: Puente Cuscatlán) was a suspension bridge that spanned the Lempa River in El Salvador. The connected the departments of San Vicente and Usulután. It opened in 1942 and it closed in 1984 when it was bombed and destroyed by the Farabundo Martí National Liberation Front (FMLN) during the Salvadoran Civil War.

== Design ==
The Cuscatlán Bridge was 1,350 feet (410 m) long, and its main span crossing the Lempa River was 820 feet (250 m) long. The suspension bridge had 64 suspension cables each measuring 16 inches (41 cm) in diameter. The base of the bridge's pillars were constructed of volcanic ash and stones.

== History ==
Construction of the Cuscatlán Bridge began in June 1940. The bridge was inaugurated by Salvadoran president Maximiliano Hernández Martínez on 6 June 1942 and construction cost 3.1 million colones. Upon its opening, the Cuscatlán Bridge was the largest in Central America. It carried part of the Pan-American Highway. The bridge connected the departments of San Vicente and Usulután. Cars passing the bridge paid a 1 colón toll; trucks paid a 2.5 colón toll.

== Destruction ==
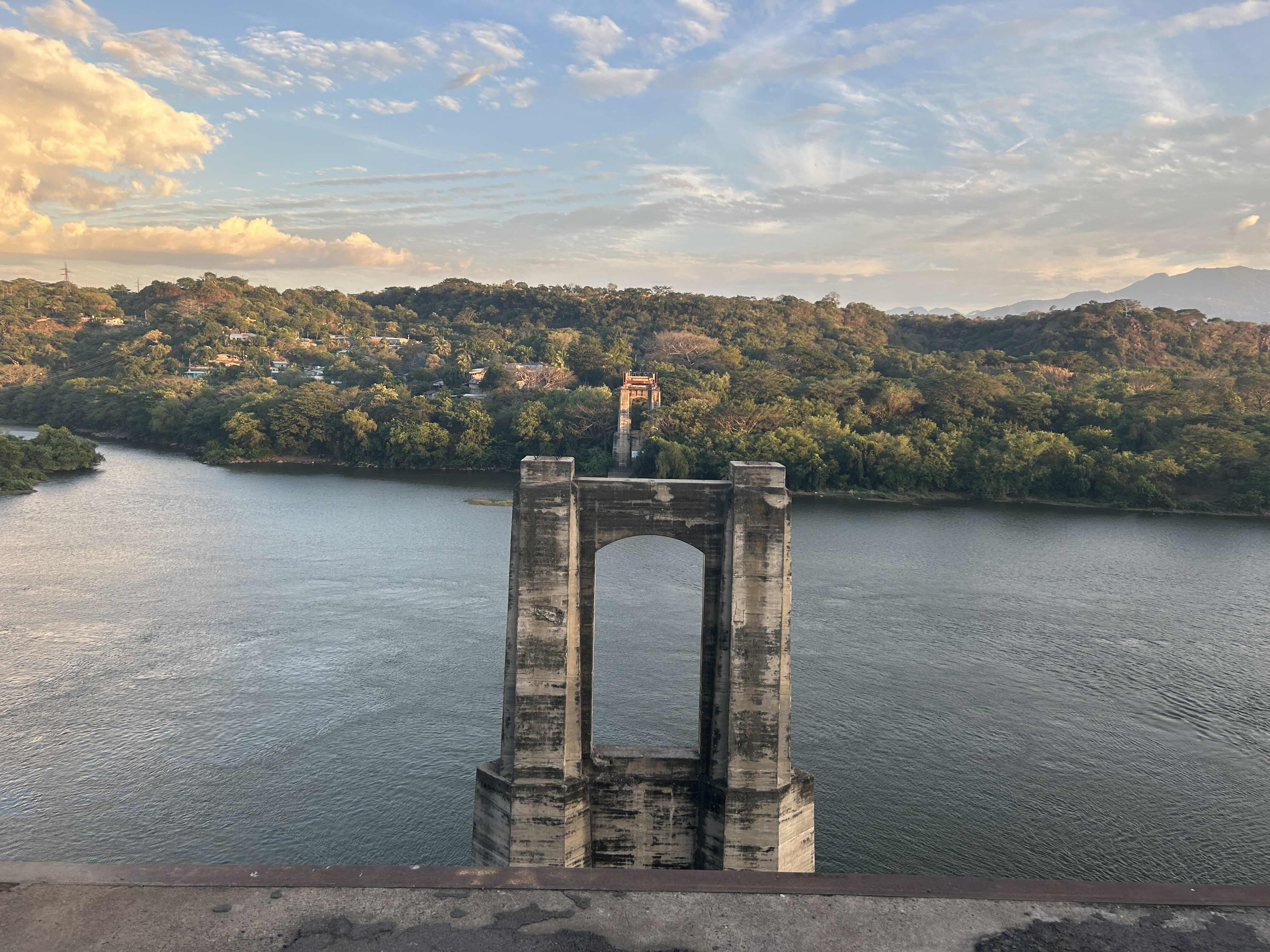
Ruins of the Cuscatlán Bridge as seen from the west end

At 2:30 a.m. on 1 January 1984, militants of the Farabundo Martí National Liberation Front (FMLN) bombed and destroyed the Cuscatlán Bridge. The bombing killed two army lieutenants and multiple soldiers. The bridge left eastern El Salvador isolated from the rest of the country and the bombing was one of the FMLN's most important victories of the Salvadoran Civil War. It was the last bridge spanning the Lempa River after the FMLN bombed the Golden Bridge on 15 October 1981.

On 3 January 1984, the Ministry of Public Works announced that it would build a temporary ford across the Lempa River to reestablish a river crossing. The ford was built 500 feet (150 m) downstream of the destroyed bridge.

== Reconstruction ==
The Salvadoran government rebuilt the Cuscatlán Bridge with the assistance of Japan in 1998. The reconstruction cost US$9 million (188 million colones).

== See also ==
- List of bridge failures
