= 1935 Salvadoran presidential election =

- 13–15 January 1935
- Turnout: 77%
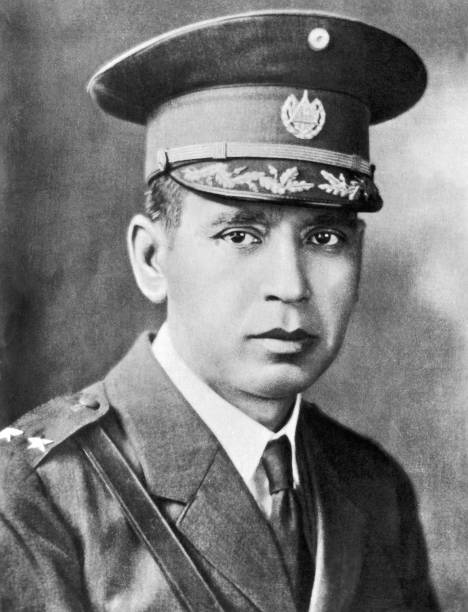
Candidate	Maximiliano Hernández Martínez
Party	Pro Patria
Popular vote	329,555
Percentage	100.00%
President before election
Andrés Ignacio Menéndez (provisional)
Pro Patria
Elected President
Maximiliano Hernández Martínez
Pro Patria

Presidential elections were held in El Salvador between 13 and 15 January 1935. Brigadier General Maximiliano Hernández Martínez was the only candidate and was elected unopposed with 329,555 votes.

In December 1931, the Armed Forces of El Salvador overthrew President Arturo Araujo and Martínez (Araujo's vice president) became El Salvador's provisional president. The United States did not recognize Martínez's presidency as the coup that brought him to power violated the 1923 Central American Treaty of Peace and Amity. In 1933, Martínez announced he would run for president in 1935 and resigned from the presidency in late 1934 to be constitutionally eligible to participate in the election. Martínez's government arrested or exiled potential opponents. He won the election unanimously and became President on 1 March 1935. The United States subsequently recognized Martínez's government and he ruled until 1944.

== Background ==
On 2 December 1931, the Armed Forces of El Salvador (FAES) overthrew President Arturo Araujo in a coup d'état and installed Brigadier General Maximiliano Hernández Martínez (Araujo's vice president) as the country's provisional president. In January 1932, Martínez suppressed a rebellion in western El Salvador, killing between 10,000 and 40,000 people. The event, known as La Matanza, solidified Martínez's control of the Salvadoran government. On 8 June 1932, Martínez announced that he would serve out Araujo's 1931–1935 presidential term.

The United States refused to recognize Martínez as the president of El Salvador, due to the 1931 coup violating the 1923 Central American Treaty of Peace and Amity. Martínez sought a temporary successor to replace him while Martínez won an election to satisfy the terms of the treaty and acquire American recognition. In mid 1932, Martínez selected Colonel Fidel Cristiano Garay as his first presidential designate (legal successor) but later chose Brigadier General Andrés Ignacio Menéndez after police chief Colonel Osmín Aguirre y Salinas threatened to revolt.

== Electoral campaign ==
In July 1933, Martínez announced that he intended to run for president in 1935. That month, Martínez established the National Pro Patria Party (PNPP) to support his electoral campaign. The party functioned as a patronage network to monopolize polling stations to ensure Martínez's victory. Many of Martínez's pro-democracy government officials resigned from their positions after Martínez's announcement; Martínez placed several under government surveillance or exiled them from the country.

Independent observers believed that Martínez would run unopposed, and British foreign minister John Simon remarked that "no organised opposition would be tolerated, and the term 'elections' is a recognised euphemism". Martínez forced both former president Pío Romero Bosque and military officer General Antonio Claramount Lucero into exile as their supporters attempted to challenge Martínez in the 1935 election; they were exiled under the accusation of planning a "communist sedition". In January 1934, Martínez announced that he foiled a coup planned by Minister of Government Colonel Salvador Castaneda Castro and had him arrested, but Simon believed that Castaneda had no involvement and that Martínez only sought to "eliminate a potential rival". In 1935, Simon wrote that "nothing short of assassination can prevent him from being reelected". Romero, Simon, and United States chargé d'affaires Jefferson Caffery believed that Martínez faced the risk of a coup if he ran unopposed as some military officers may have wanted to run for president themselves. Among Martínez's chief opponents within the military were junior officers who were unable to hold multiple positions to collect multiple salaries as in previous government.

During the 1933 and 1934 municipal elections, Martínez ensured that members of the PNPP were elected so that they could ensure polling stations in their municipalities favored Martínez in the 1935 presidential election. According to historian Erik Ching, Martínez wanted a "unanimous victory" to serve as a "public demonstration of [his] power and capacity as the supreme political boss". All government employees were required to vote and PNPP members were encouraged by local officials to vote by simplifying the voting process, so that it only required them to show their party membership card.

According to the constitution of El Salvador, re-election was prohibited. To get around this restriction, Martínez obtained a leave of absence from the Legislative Assembly and resigned as provisional president on 28 August 1934. He handed the provisional presidency to Menéndez, who was also serving as the minister of war. According to Martínez, him running in the election was not him seeking re-election but instead seeking a second mandate, as he would not be in office exercising the duties of the presidency at the time of the election.

== Results ==
"Throughout Cabañas Department elections for supreme authorities are being conducted in the greatest of order. Voting is unanimous in favor of the noble cause postulated by General Maximiliano H. Martínez [...] People are providing a civic and patriotic demonstration. We expect complete success."

— Comandante of Cabañas Juan Vidal, 14 January 1935

The 1935 presidential election was held from 13 to 15 January 1935. According to the Salvadoran government, 77 percent of registered voters participated in the election. The final results announced that Martínez won unanimously with 329,555 votes. Martínez was the only candidate. Regarding the result, Simon remarked that "The election itself on the 13th to the 15th January, was the usual farce. There was no other candidate, but the people were nevertheless urged to record their votes."

Candidate	Party	Votes	%
Maximiliano Hernández Martínez	National Pro Patria Party	329,555	100.00
Total		329,555	100.00
Registered voters/turnout			77
Source: Ching 1997, pp. 398–399

== Aftermath ==
After Martínez's 1935 electoral victory, the United States recognized his presidency. Martínez was inaugurated on 1 March 1935. Martínez personally admired fascist leaders such as Adolf Hitler and Benito Mussolini. During Martínez's 1935–1939 term, he appointed Nazi-sympathizers and Germans to some government positions, purchased military equipment (such as aircraft and firearms) from Fascist Italy, recognized the independence of Manchukuo (a Japanese puppet state), and recognized the government of General Francisco Franco during the Spanish Civil War. Martínez also proclaimed the "Martínez Doctrine" in 1937 that instructed the government to never take future loans.

Martínez was re-elected unopposed in 1939 and 1944. Both times, the Legislative Assembly elected Martínez (rather than through a popular election) after amending the constitution to allow him to run for subsequent re-elections. Martínez resigned on 8 May 1944 during the Strike of Fallen Arms student protests against his government and left the country for exile in Honduras on 11 May. Martínez was President for twelve years and is El Salvador's longest serving president.

== Bibliography ==
- Anderson, Thomas P. (1971). Matanza: El Salvador's Communist Revolt of 1932. Lincoln, Nebraska: University of Nebraska. ISBN 9780803207943. LCCN 78146885. OCLC 1150304117.
- Astilla, Carmelo Francisco Esmeralda (1976). "The Martinez Era: Salvadoran–American Relations, 1931–1944". Louisiana State University. Ann Arbor, Michigan. OCLC 3809272.
- Bernal Ramírez, Luis Guillermo & Quijano de Batres, Ana Elia, eds. (2009). Historia 2 El Salvador [History 2 El Salvador] (PDF). Historia El Salvador (in Spanish). El Salvador: Ministry of Education. ISBN 9789992363683. Archived from the original (PDF) on 16 October 2022.
- Ching, Erik K. (1997). From Clientelism to Militarism: The State, Politics and Authoritarianism in El Salvador, 1840–1940. Santa Barbara, California: University of California, Santa Barbara. OCLC 39326756. ProQuest 304330235.
- Grieb, Kenneth J. (1971). "The United States and the Rise of General Maximiliano Hernández Martínez". Journal of Latin American Studies. 3 (2). Cambridge University Press: 151–172. doi:10.1017/S0022216X00001425. ISSN 0022-216X. JSTOR 156558. OCLC 9983670644. S2CID 146607906.
- Haggerty, Richard A., ed. (1990). El Salvador: A Country Study (2nd ed.). Washington, D.C., United States: Federal Research Division. ISBN 9780525560371. LCCN 89048948. OCLC 1044677008.
- Krennerich, Michael (2005). "El Salvador". In Nohlen, Dieter (ed.). Elections in the Americas A Data Handbook Volume 1: North America, Central America, and the Caribbean. Oxford, United Kingdom: Oxford University Press. pp. 270–299. ISBN 9780191557934. OCLC 58051010.
- Lindo Fuentes, Héctor; Ching, Erik K. & Lara Martínez, Rafael A. (2007). Remembering a Massacre in El Salvador: The Insurrection of 1932, Roque Dalton, and the Politics of Historical Memory. Albuquerque, New Mexico: University of New Mexico Press. ISBN 9780826336040. OCLC 122424174.
- Luna, David (1969). "Analisis de una Dictadura Fascista Latinoamericana, Maximiliano Hernández Martínez, 1931–1944" [Analysis of a Latin American Fascist Dictatorship, Maximiliano Hernández Martínez, 1931–1944]. Revista la Universidad (in Spanish) (5). San Salvador, El Salvador: University of El Salvador: 41–130. ISSN 0041-8242. OCLC 493370684.
- Olmedo, Daniel (3 May 2023). "El Segundo Mandato de Maximiliano Hernández Martínez" [Maximiliano Hernández Martínez's Second Mandate]. Revista FactUM (in Spanish). Archived from the original on 29 August 2025.
- Tulchin, Joseph S. & Bland, Gary, eds. (1992). Is There a Transition to Democracy in El Salvador?. L. Rienner Publishers. ISBN 9781555873103.
