= 1939 Salvadoran Constitutional Assembly election =

- January 1939
- All 42 seats in the Constitutional Assembly; 22 seats needed for a majority
Party	Leader	Vote %	Seats
Pro Patria	Maximiliano Hernández Martínez	100	42
This lists parties that won seats. See the complete results below.
President of the National Assembly before	President of the National Assembly after
César Cierra; Pro Patria	Francisco Antonio Reyes; Pro Patria

Constitutional Assembly elections were held in El Salvador in January 1939. At the time the country was a one-party state under the control of the National Pro Patria Party.

== Results ==
Party	Votes	%	Seats
National Pro Patria Party	210,810	100.00	42
Total	210,810	100.00	42

== Elected Members ==
Department	Deputy	Political affiliation
San Salvador	Salvador Sol Millet	National Pro Patria Party
San Salvador	Juan Francisco Aguilar	National Pro Patria Party
San Salvador	Francisco Bertrand Galindo	National Pro Patria Party
Santa Ana	Francisco Antonio Reyes	National Pro Patria Party
Santa Ana	José Lucio Martínez	National Pro Patria Party
Santa Ana	Luis Medina Gómez	National Pro Patria Party
Chalatenango	Héctor Fajardo Rivas	National Pro Patria Party
Chalatenango	Manuel Basilio Escobar	National Pro Patria Party
Chalatenango	Cristóbal Escobar	National Pro Patria Party
Sonsonate	Juan Antonio Arce	National Pro Patria Party
Sonsonate	Lisandro Larín Zepeda	National Pro Patria Party
Sonsonate	José Guillermo Campo	National Pro Patria Party
Cuscatlán	Héctor Infante	National Pro Patria Party
Cuscatlán	Carlos Alberto Liévano	National Pro Patria Party
Cuscatlán	José Maximiliano Díaz	National Pro Patria Party
Ahuachapán	Rafael Alfonso Rivas	National Pro Patria Party
Ahuachapán	Juan Padilla	National Pro Patria Party
Ahuachapán	José Durán Rivas	National Pro Patria Party
La Paz	Cayetano Salegio	National Pro Patria Party
La Paz	Carlos Guzmán Dreyfus	National Pro Patria Party
La Paz	Damián Rodríguez	National Pro Patria Party
La Libertad	Luis Vega Segura	National Pro Patria Party
La Libertad	Jorge Sotero Argueta	National Pro Patria Party
La Libertad	José Roberto Parker	National Pro Patria Party
Cabañas	José Bruno Velasco	National Pro Patria Party
Cabañas	Magdaleno Abarca	National Pro Patria Party
Cabañas	Balmore R. Alfaro	National Pro Patria Party
La Unión	César Cierra	National Pro Patria Party
La Unión	Francisco Federico Reyes	National Pro Patria Party
La Unión	José Agustín Martínez	National Pro Patria Party
San Vicente	Gustavo Acevedo Aguilar	National Pro Patria Party
San Vicente	José Basilio Merino	National Pro Patria Party
San Vicente	José Valentín Jaimes	National Pro Patria Party
Morazán	David Turcios	National Pro Patria Party
Morazán	Gerardo Barrios Quesada	National Pro Patria Party
Morazán	José A. Martínez	National Pro Patria Party
Usulután	Miguel A. Soriano	National Pro Patria Party
Usulután	Amílcar Ávila	National Pro Patria Party
Usulután	Gilberto Flamenco	National Pro Patria Party
San Miguel	Fabio Simón Nuila	National Pro Patria Party
San Miguel	José Erasmo Pacheco	National Pro Patria Party
San Miguel	Bernardo García Prieto	National Pro Patria Party

== Bibliography ==
- Political Handbook of the world, 1939 New York, 1940.
