= 1939 Salvadoran presidential election =

- 21 January 1939
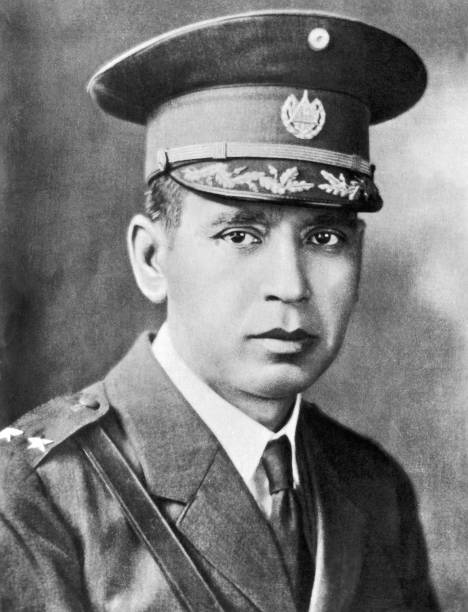
Candidate	Maximiliano Hernández Martínez
Party	Pro Patria
Legislative vote	42
Percentage	100.00%
President before election
Maximiliano Hernández Martínez
Pro Patria
Elected President
Maximiliano Hernández Martínez
Pro Patria

Presidential elections were held in El Salvador on 21 January 1939. The election was indirect rather than being held through a popular vote. The National Constitutional Assembly elected Brigadier General Maximiliano Hernández Martínez, the incumbent president of El Salvador, to a third presidential term that would last from 1939 to 1945. He was the only candidate and won unopposed.

Martínez was constitutionally ineligible to run for re-election in 1939, so the year prior, he and the National Pro Patria Party (PNPP) held open cabildos across El Salvador and reported that the citizenry overwhelmingly supported amending the constitution to allow Martínez to be re-elected. Some politicians and military officers opposed Martínez's re-election. They spread propaganda calling for his resignation and even attempted a coup in January 1939. On 20 January 1939, the National Constitutional Assembly approved a new constitution, and the following day, it unanimously re-elected Martínez to a six-year term.

== Background ==
Brigadier General Maximiliano Hernández Martínez became President of El Salvador in December 1931 after a coup d'état overthrew President Arturo Araujo and established a military dictatorship. Martínez solidified his position in January 1932 after suppressing an uprising and killing between 10,000 and 40,000 people in mass killings known as La Matanza. Martínez won the 1935 presidential election unopposed with 329,555 on 77 percent turnout.

== Election campaign ==
"Pro-Patria Delegation was opened last night amidst fevered regalia. Last night conferences were held in the central plaza and a reception was given in the Central Hotel. Today the conferences continue with the goal of holding the public session of the cabildo abierto. In unison the citizens agree with out patriotic ideals."

— Governor of Usulután Antonio Galdámez, 17 July 1938

"It is time that the head of this [constitutional] pact be convinced that the devotion to democracy in El Salvador is a tangible fact. General Martínez should not stain our fatherland with fresh blood. He should respect the prevailing Constitution. He should avoid causing the people of El Salvador to remain downtrodden forever."

— Civilian-Military Association, 19 September 1938

Ahead of the 1939 election, Martínez decided to be elected by the legislature in an indirect election instead of through a popular vote like in 1935. According to historian Erik Ching, Martínez chose to do this as he was "aware of growing opposition to his political monopoly". In order to be re-elected, however, Martínez had to amend the 1886 constitution as it prohibited re-election.

In July 1938, open cabildos were held across El Salvador where citizens would meet at town halls and approve proposed constitutional changes. The National Pro Patria Party ("National Party of the Fatherland", PNPP), the only legal political party in El Salvador, organized the meetings and reported that the citizenry was in unanimous support of the proposed changes despite no voting actually taking place.

The PNPP reported that Salvadoran citizens overwhelmingly supported the constitutional reforms and that there were "popular" rallies and parades leading up to the election. Meanwhile, some political leaders opposed Martínez's re-election. Among them were Sub-Secretary of Public Works Manuel López Harrison, Sub-Secretary of Government Hermógenes Alvarado, Sub-Secretary of Public Instruction David Rosales, and Sub-Secretary of War Colonel Ascencio Menéndez. In October 1938, a so-called "Civilian-Military Association" spread propaganda posters across Santa Ana calling for Martínez's resignation. In January 1939, Menéndez led an attempted coup against Martínez's government but it failed. The conspirators were exiled to France and Mexico.

The National Constitutional Assembly approved the new constitution on 20 January 1939. Most of the new constitution was identical to the 1886 constitution. One of the most notable differences regards article 92 that mandates that the National Constitutional Assembly would elect the next president and that whoever they elect would be exempted from article 94 that banned re-election. It also increased the lengths of presidential terms from four to six years.

== Results ==
On 21 January 1939, the National Constitutional Assembly convened to elect El Salvador's president for the 1939–1945 term. The assembly unanimously voted to re-elected Martínez as President.

Candidate	Party	Votes	%
Maximiliano Hernández Martínez	National Pro Patria Party	42	100.00
Total		42	100.00
Registered voters/turnout		42	100.00
Source: Diario Oficial 1939, p. 177

== Aftermath ==
Martínez was inaugurated for his third term on 1 March 1939. Martínez was re-elected by the legislature to another six-year term in 1944 but he was forced to resign on 8 May 1944 during the Strike of Fallen Arms, a student protest that opposed his government. Martínez subsequently fled El Salvador on 11 May. The military itself continued to rule the country until the 1979 Salvadoran coup d'état.

== Bibliography ==
- "Asamblea Nacional Constituyente" [National Constitutional Assembly] (PDF). Diario Oficial (in Spanish). Vol. 125, no. 17. San Salvador, El Salvador. 23 January 1939. p. 177. Archived from the original (PDF) on 16 May 2024.
- Bernal Ramírez, Luis Guillermo & Quijano de Batres, Ana Elia, eds. (2009). Historia 2 El Salvador [History 2 El Salvador] (PDF). Historia El Salvador (in Spanish). El Salvador: Ministry of Education. ISBN 9789992363683. Archived from the original (PDF) on 16 October 2022.
- Ching, Erik K. (1997). From Clientelism to Militarism: The State, Politics and Authoritarianism in El Salvador, 1840–1940. Santa Barbara, California: University of California, Santa Barbara. OCLC 39326756. ProQuest 304330235.
- Leistenschneider, María & Leistenschneider, Freddy (1980). Gobernantes de El Salvador: Biografías [Governors of El Salvador: Biographies] (in Spanish). Ministry of the Interior. OCLC 7876291.
- Lindo Fuentes, Héctor; Ching, Erik K. & Lara Martínez, Rafael A. (2007). Remembering a Massacre in El Salvador: The Insurrection of 1932, Roque Dalton, and the Politics of Historical Memory. Albuquerque, New Mexico: University of New Mexico Press. ISBN 9780826336040. OCLC 122424174.
- Olmedo, Daniel (3 May 2023). "El Segundo Mandato de Maximiliano Hernández Martínez" [Maximiliano Hernández Martínez's Second Mandate]. Revista FactUM (in Spanish).
- Tulchin, Joseph S. & Bland, Gary, eds. (1992). Is There a Transition to Democracy in El Salvador?. L. Rienner Publishers. ISBN 9781555873103.
