= 1939 Swiss referendums =

Four referendums were held in Switzerland during 1939. The first two were held on 22 January on a popular initiative on civil rights (which was rejected) and a federal resolution on the restricted use of the urgency clause in the constitution (which was approved). The third was held on 4 June on a constitutional amendment regarding the funding for government policies on defence and unemployment, and was approved by voters. The fourth was held on 3 December on a federal law on the employment status and insurance for federal civil servants, and was rejected by voters.

== Background ==
The referendums on the urgency clause and the funding of defence and unemployment policies both involved amending the constitution, and so were "obligatory" referendums, requiring a double majority; a majority of the popular vote and majority of the cantons. The decision of each canton was based on the vote in that canton. Full cantons counted as one vote, whilst half cantons counted as half. The popular initiative on civil rights also required a double majority, whilst the referendum on civil servants was an optional referendum, requiring only a majority of voters in favour to pass.

== Results ==
=== January: popular initiative on civil rights ===
Choice	Popular vote		Cantons		
Choice	Votes	%	Full	Half	Total
For	141,323	28.9	0	0	0
Against	347,340	71.1	19	6	22
Blank votes	77,687	–	–	–	–
Invalid votes	3,211	–	–	–	–
Total	569,561	100	19	6	22
Registered voters/turnout	1,223,536	46.6	–	–	–
Source: Nohlen & Stöver

=== January: Use of the urgency clause ===
Choice	Popular vote		Cantons		
Choice	Votes	%	Full	Half	Total
For	346,024	69.1	18	6	21
Against	155,032	30.9	1	0	1
Blank votes	65,459	–	–	–	–
Invalid votes	3,046	–	–	–	–
Total	569,561	100	19	6	22
Registered voters/turnout	1,223,536	46.6	–	–	–
Source: Nohlen & Stöver

=== June: Funding for defence and unemployment policy ===
Choice	Popular vote		Cantons		
Choice	Votes	%	Full	Half	Total
For	445,622	69.1	16	6	19
Against	199,540	30.9	3	0	3
Blank votes	24,871	–	–	–	–
Invalid votes	1,420	–	–	–	–
Total	671,453	100	19	6	22
Registered voters/turnout	1,226,873	54.7	–	–	–
Source: Nohlen & Stöver

=== December: Civil servants ===
Choice	Votes	%
For	290,238	37.6
Against	481,035	62.4
Blank votes	19,524	–
Invalid votes	2,102	–
Total	792,899	100
Registered voters/turnout	1,241,404	63.9
Source: Nohlen & Stöver
