= 1939 Saudi Arabian municipal elections =

Municipal elections were held in Saudi Arabia in March 1939. Although elections had been held during the Ottoman era and municipal elections were held in Mecca in 1924 and 1926 after its conquest by Ibn Saud, these were the first in united Saudi Arabia.

The number of elected members varied by city; fourteen in Mecca, eight in Jedda and Medina and four in all other municipalities.

== Background ==
The elections were held in accordance with the 1938 municipalities law. Mayors remained unelected, but could be questioned by the elected members.

== Results ==
Following the elections, Taher Al-Dabbagh became head of Mecca City Council.
