= 1939 Honduran presidential election =

Presidential elections were held in Honduras on 18 December 1939.

"On 12 December 1939, a group of five deputies presented a proposal to Congress suggesting that article 202 be reformed to allow the president Tiburcio Carías Andino and vice-president to remain in power until 1 January 1949. By Decree 16 on 18 December 1939, this proposal was unanimously adopted".

== Bibliography ==
- Euraque, Darío A. Reinterpreting the banana republic: region and state in Honduras, 1870–1972. Chapel Hill: The University of North Carolina Press. 1996.
- Krehm, William. Democracia y tiranias en el Caribe. Buenos Aires: Editorial Parnaso. (First edition in 1947). 1957.
- Political handbook of the world 1940. New York, 1941.
- Stokes, William S. Honduras: an area study in government. Madison: University of Wisconsin Press. 1950.
