= 1939 Cleveland mayoral election =

US mayoral election

Cleveland mayoral election, 1939
- November 7, 1939
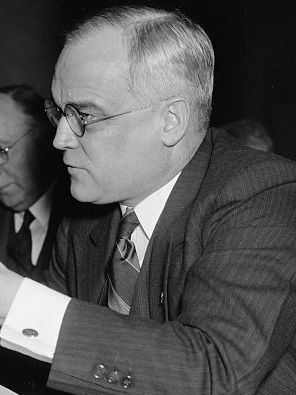

Nominee	Harold Hitz Burton	John O'Donnell
Party	Republican	Democratic
Popular vote	141,858	104,551
Percentage	57.57%	42.43%
Mayor before election
Harold Hitz Burton
Republican
Elected mayor
Harold Hitz Burton
Republican

The Cleveland mayoral election of 1939 saw the re-election of the Republican, Harold Hitz Burton to a third term. He became the Mayor of Cleveland, over the Democratic John O'Donnell.

== General election ==
1939 Cleveland mayoral election (general election)
Party	Candidate	Votes	%
Republican	Harold Hitz Burton (incumbent)	141,858	57.57%
Democratic	John O'Donnell	104,551	42.43%
Turnout		246,409	
