= 1944 Salvadoran Constitutional Assembly election =

- January 1944
- All 42 seats in the Constitutional; 22 seats needed for a majority
President of the National Assembly before	President of the National Assembly after
Francisco Antonio Reyes; Pro Patria	Francisco Antonio Reyes; Pro Patria

Constitutional Assembly elections were held in El Salvador in January 1944, however, no results were posted.

== Bibliography ==
- Anderson, Thomas P. Matanza: El Salvador's communist revolt of 1932. Lincoln: University of Nebraska Press. 1971.
- Krehm, William. Democracia y tiranias en el Caribe. Buenos Aires: Editorial Parnaso. 1957.
- Political Handbook of the world, 1944. New York, 1945.
