= 1939 Baltimore mayoral election =

Baltimore mayoral election, 1939
- May 2, 1939

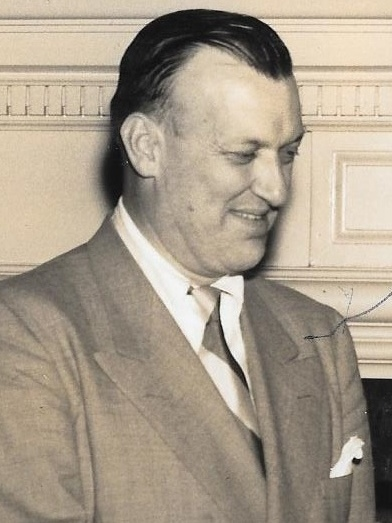
Candidate	Howard W. Jackson	Theodore McKeldin
Party	Democratic	Republican
Popular vote	109,638	84,832
Percentage	56.38%	43.62%
Mayor before election
Howard W. Jackson
Democratic
Elected mayor
Howard W. Jackson
Democratic

The 1939 Baltimore mayoral election saw the reelection of Howard W. Jackson for a third consecutive and fourth overall term.

== General election ==
The general election was held May 2.

Baltimore mayoral general election, 1939
Party	Candidate	Votes	%
Democratic	Howard W. Jackson (incumbent)	109,638	56.38%
Republican	Theodore McKeldin	84,832	43.62%
Total votes		194,470	
