= Estanzuelas =

Coordinates: 13°39′N 88°30′W

Estanzuelas is a municipality in the Usulután department of El Salvador.

== Geography ==
The municipality is located to the southeast of San Ildefonso of the department of San Vicente, to the north of Mercedes Umaña and to the west of Nueva Granada. Estanzuelas has a total area of 71.73 km^{2}.

== History ==
La Estancia Sola, which was the name of the only hacienda in the old days, was changed to what is now known as Estanzuelas. The name was changed as the town grew and was eventually divided into six barrios: El Calvario, El Belen, Las Flores, San Antonio, El Centro, and San Pablo.

== Culture ==
Many natives of Estanzuelas have migrated to the U.S. where they reside in communities in Texas, Virginia, Tennessee, New York, New Jersey, Las Vegas, San Francisco, Florida, Boston, Los Angeles and Chicago. Estanzuelas is a small city with few public services. It has a plaza, an open market, a catholic church, a small clinic, a police station a postal office and a park where most of the kids stay to mostly play soccer.

People have to travel for other services such as banking to close towns such as Santiago de Maria and San Miguel.

Among some of the types of food you can savor in Estanzuelas are: tilapia fish, shrimp and fresh-water crab, sardines, pupusas, quesadillas (baked sweet bread), atol de elote (young corn oatmeal) and sopa de pescado (soup of fish).

== Sport ==
Each canton of the city, with the exception of EL Centro has a football team that plays in the Town Stadium near the cemetery.
