= Kenneth Grieb =

American academic

Doctor Kenneth Grieb
- Born: April 3, 1939; Buffalo, New York, US
- Died: July 13, 2018 (aged 79); Oshkosh, Wisconsin, US
- Education: University at Buffalo; Indiana University
- Occupation: Professor
- Years active: 1966–2018
- Spouse: Kelly Rigby
- Children: 2
- Awards: Regents Teaching Excellence Award

Kenneth J. Grieb (April 3, 1939 – July 13, 2018) was an American professor from New York who taught at the University of Wisconsin–Oshkosh. He coordinated the university's Model United Nations team starting in 1968.

A $1.9 million scholarship program, the Kenneth J. Grieb Scholarship Fund, was created in his name posthumously in 2018.

== Bibliography ==
Articles published by Kenneth J. Grieb include:

- The United States and the Central American Federation (1967)
- The Lind Mission to Mexico (1968)
- The Causes of the Carranza Rebellion: A Reinterpretation (1968)
- Reginald del Valle: A California Diplomat's Sojourn in Mexico (1968)
- Warren G. Harding and the Dominican Republic U.S. Withdrawal, 1921–1923 (1969)
- The Domestic Scene as a Key to Latin America (1969)
- Discussion Summary (1969)
- A Badger General's Foray into Diplomacy: General Edward S. Bragg in Mexico (1969)
- American Involvement in the Rise of Jorge Ubico (1970)
- The United States and General Jorge Ubico's Retention of Power (1971)
- Standard Oil and the Financing of the Mexican Revolution (1971)
- The United States and the Rise of General Maximiliano Hernandez Martinez (1971)
- Area Studies and the Traditional Disciplines (1974)
- Jorge Ubico and the Belize Boundary Dispute (1974)
- Concentration of Political Power and Levels of Economic Development in Latin American Countries: A Comment and a Research Proposal (1974)
- Sir Lionel Carden and the Anglo-American Confrontation in Mexico: 1913 – 1914 (1975)
- A Brief Outline History of the Midwest Association for Latin American Studies (1975 with Robert L. Carmin and N. Merrill Rippy)
- The Guatemalan Military and the Revolution of 1944 (1976)
- History's Contribution to the Study of Social Revolution in Latin America (1976)
- Guatemala and the Second World War (1977)
- The Myth of a Central American Dictators' League (1978)
- Guatemalan Caudillo: The Regime of Jorge Ubico, Guatemala – 1931–1944 (1979)
