= Manuel Adriano Vilanova =

Salvadoran physician and politician

Manuel Adriano Vilanova Córdova

Vice President of El Salvador
- In office 1 March 1945 – 14 December 1948
- President: Salvador Castaneda Castro
- Preceded by: Maximiliano Hernández Martínez
- Succeeded by: José María Peralta Salazar

Personal details
- Born: 18 August 1873 San Miguel, El Salvador
- Party: Unification Social Democratic Party

Manuel Adriano Vilanova Córdova was a Salvadoran physician and politician who served as Vice President of El Salvador during the presidency of general Salvador Castaneda Castro.

Vilanova was born on 18 August 1873 in San Miguel. He was educated at University of El Salvador and graduated as doctor of medicine in 1906. He was a pediatrician. He worked as professor at the Universidad Nacional. Vilanova was the co-founder of Sanatorio de Tuberculosis Nacional. He was a public health director.

Vilanova was elected alongside general Salvador Castaneda Castro in the elections of February 1945. He served as Vice President of El Salvador from 1 March 1945 to 14 December 1948. In addition to vice presidency, Vilanova was the director general of the ministry of health, and also the mayor of San Salvador from 1947 to 1948. He was overthrown in a coup alongside Castaneda Castro.
