= San Ildefonso, El Salvador =

San Ildefonso
- Municipality
- Location in El Salvador
- Coordinates: 13°42′N 88°34′W
- Country: El Salvador
- Department: San Vicente Department

Area
  - Total: 52.65 sq mi (136.37 km^{2})
- Elevation: 673 ft (205 m)

Population (2001)
  - Total: 10,015

San Ildefonso is a municipality in the San Vicente department of El Salvador.
