= Salvador Castaneda Castro =

President of El Salvador from 1945 to 1948

General Salvador Castaneda Castro
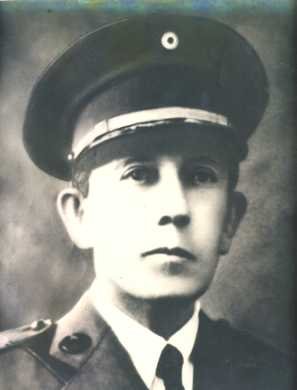
- Castaneda in c. 1915

28th President of El Salvador
- In office 1 March 1945 – 14 December 1948
- Vice President: Manuel Adriano Vilanova
- Preceded by: Osmín Aguirre y Salinas (provisional)
- Succeeded by: Revolutionary Council of Government (Óscar Osorio as President in 1950)

Minister of National Defense of El Salvador
- In office 1 March 1945 – March 1945
- President: Himself
- Preceded by: Salvador Peña Trejo (provisional)
- Succeeded by: Mauro Espínola Castro

Minister of Government, Promotion, Agriculture, Labor, Sanitation, and Charity of El Salvador
- In office December 1931 – January 1934; Provisional Minister
- President: Maximiliano Hernández Martínez (provisional)
- Preceded by: Joaquín Novoa
- Succeeded by: José Tomás Calderón (provisional)

Personal details
- Born: 6 August 1888 Chalchuapa, El Salvador
- Died: 5 March 1965 (aged 76) San Salvador, El Salvador
- Party: Social Democratic Unification Party
- Spouse: Josefina Bulnes de Castaneda Castro
- Children: 4
- Education: Military School
- Occupation: Military officer, politician

Military service
- Allegiance: El Salvador
- Branch/service: Salvadoran Army
- Years of service: 1906–1948
- Rank: General
- Battles/wars: La Matanza

Salvador Castaneda Castro (6 August 1888 – 5 March 1965) was a Salvadoran military officer who served as the 28th President of El Salvador from 1 March 1945 to his overthrow on 14 December 1948. He also served as Minister of Government, Promotion, Agriculture, Labor, Sanitation, and Charity from 1931 to 1935 and as Minister of War, the Navy, and Aviation during March 1945.

== Early life ==
Salvador Castaneda Castro was born on 6 August 1888 in Chalchuapa, El Salvador.

== Military career ==
Castaneda joined the Salvadoran Army in 1906 and became a sub-lieutenant on 11 July. He was promoted to lieutenant on 30 November 1906; to captain on 12 April 1911; major captain on 5 February 1912; lieutenant colonel on 27 June 1916; colonel on 3 June 1920; and general on 21 May 1929. Sometime during Castaneda's career, he served as the director of the Military School. He was also the government of various departments, including Cuscatlán during the presidency of Pío Romero Bosque.

After the 1931 Salvadoran coup d'état that overthrew President Arturo Araujo in December, General Maximiliano Hernández Martínez (El Salvador's provisional president) appointed Castaneda as Minister of Government, Promotion, Agriculture, Labor, Sanitation, and Charity. Martínez appointed Castaneda because Martínez viewed him as a trustworthy older military officer, as Martínez had appointed several junior officers to important government and military positions. On 8 December 1931, Castaneda published nation-wide memo that affirmed Martínez's government's commitment to "harmony, personal liberties, and the preservation of private property". He also pledged that "the civil and military authorities of this government will lend guarantees to all persons who support [...] the democratic institutions of the nation".

In January 1934, Martínez accused Castaneda and other military officers of plotting a coup against him. According to Martínez's government, Castaneda confessed to plotting to installing a political party to power that would steal wealth from the military and the people and distribute it to the country's wealthy landowners. British ambassador Hill described the coup as "a good excuse to get rid of many troublesome individuals by deportation" and believed that Castaneda's involvement was fabricated by Martínez to eliminate him as a rival in the 1935 presidential election. Castaneda was arrested and imprisoned but was later released. In October 1935, Castaneda was exiled to Panama after allegedly plotting another coup.

== 1945 presidential election ==
Martínez resigned from the presidency and fled El Salvador in 1944 during the Strike of Fallen Arms student protest against his government. Martínez was succeeded by General Andrés Ignacio Menéndez. Menéndez called for political liberalization and free elections. Castaneda stood as a presidential candidate for the Social Democratic Unification Party (PUSD).

On 21 October, Colonel Osmín Aguirre y Salinas overthrew Menéndez one day after the Democratic Unification Party (PUD) held a rally in San Salvador supporting the Guatemalan government that was established during the Guatemalan Revolution. Aguirre suppressed the PUD and exiled many of its leaders. Many opposition candidates, including the PUD's Arturo Romero, boycotted the January 1945 presidential election. As a result, Castaneda won virtually unopposed. He won 312,754 votes accounting for 99.7 percent.

== Presidency ==
Castaneda became President of El Salvador on 1 March 1945. Manuel Adriano Vilanova was his vice president. Castaneda appointed a cabinet consisting of Arturo Argüello Loucel as Minister of Foreign Relations; Efraín Jovel as Minister of the Interior; Carlos Alberto Guirola as Minister of the Economy; and Ranulfo Castro as Minister of Culture. Castaneda served as Minister of National Defense in March 1945 before appointing General Mauro Espínola Castro. Many of Castaneda's political appointments served under Martínez, and contemporary commentators viewed Castaneda's presidency as merely a continuation of Martínez's presidency.

Castaneda met Guatemalan president Juan José Arévalo at the El Salvador–Guatemala border on 17 May 1945 and signed a pact that declared that both countries intended to form a political union. On 10 June, the Salvadoran Air Force attempted a coup against Castaneda and bombed the headquarters of the National Police. The coup failed and its leaders were exiled. After the coup attempt, Castaneda placed El Salvador under a "state of siege" that lasted for the rest of his presidency.

During Castaneda's presidency, he established the holidays of Telegraphist Day, Soldier's Day, and Mother's Day on 27 April, 7 May, and 10 May, respectively. No executions were carried out during his presidency. Castaneda was accused of corruption when he allegedly stole from state revenues from selling coffee. In October 1945, a newspaper reported that Guirola had resigned as Minister of the Economy when he had not done so. Castaneda offered to appoint Guirola as Minister of Foreign Relations but Guirola resigned in protest. Argüello resigned as Minister of Foreign Relations when he learned that Castaneda offered Guirola his office. Castaneda's cabinet collapsed when more ministers resigned. It took one month for Castaneda to appoint new ministers.

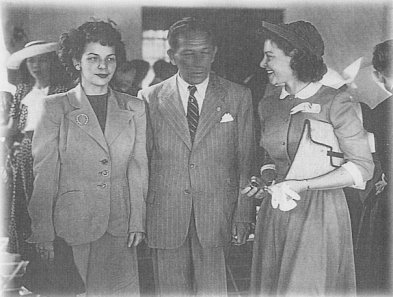
Castaneda with Costa Rican first lady Henrietta Boggs (right)

In January 1946, Castaneda's government loosened restrictions on labor unions. He also reestablished the Ministry of Labor, but workers were dissatisfied with working conditions and wages and held strikes in August and September. The ministry declared the strikes to be illegal. In response, workers held a strike at Plaza Libertad in San Salvador; security forces shot at the crowd, killing some strikers. Bakers held a strike in October, but this strike was also suppressed. By the end of 1946, the country's labor unions had gone underground.

== Overthrow ==
On 13 December 1948, as the 1949 presidential election approached, the Legislative Assembly issued a decree that allowed Castaneda to stand as a presidential candidate. El Salvador's constitution prohibited re-election, so the legislature's decree bypassed the constitutional restriction and allowed Castaneda to seek re-election. The following day, junior military officers overthrew Castaneda in the Majors' Coup. He was replaced by the Revolutionary Council of Government that ruled El Salvador until 1950.

Castaneda was imprisoned after the coup. He and his wife were tried in 1950 for illegally enriching themselves while Castaneda was President.

== Personal life ==
Castaneda married Josefina Bulnes. The couple had four daughters: Aracely, Marta, Concepción, and Elena. Castaneda died in San Salvador on 5 March 1965.

== Dates of ranks ==
The following is a list of Castaneda's military ranks during his career.

Insignia	Rank	Service branch	Date of promotion
Sub-lieutenant	Sub-lieutenant	Army	11 July 1906
Lieutenant	Lieutenant	Army	30 November 1906
Captain	Captain	Army	12 April 1911
Major captain	Major captain	Army	5 February 1912
Lieutenant colonel	Lieutenant colonel	Army	27 June 1916
Colonel	Colonel	Army	3 June 1920
General	General	Army	21 May 1929

== See also ==
- List of heads of state and government with a military background

Political offices
Preceded by Joaquín Novoa	Minister of Government, Promotion, Agriculture, Labor, Sanitation, and Charity of El Salvador; 1931–1934	Succeeded by José Tomás Calderón (provisional)
Preceded by Osmín Aguirre y Salinas (provisional)	President of El Salvador; 1945–1948	Succeeded by Revolutionary Council of Government
Preceded by Col. Salvador Peña Trejo (provisional)	Minister of National Defense of El Salvador; 1945	Succeeded by Gen. Mauro Espínola Castro
