= 1944 Salvadoran presidential election =

- January 1944
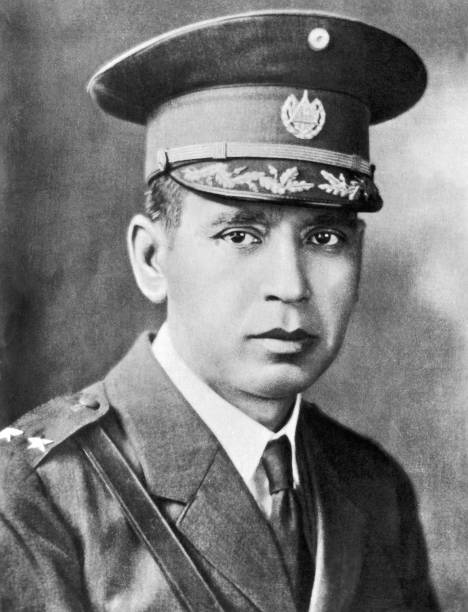
Candidate	Maximiliano Hernández Martínez
Party	Pro Patria
Legislative vote	42
Percentage	100%
President before election
Maximiliano Hernández Martínez
Pro Patria
Elected President
Maximiliano Hernández Martínez
Pro Patria

Presidential elections were held in El Salvador in January 1944. Maximiliano Hernández Martínez was the only candidate and won the election, but no results were posted. This was the last election until 2024 in which an incumbent president was re-elected.

== Bibliography ==
- Anderson, Thomas P (1971) Matanza: El Salvador's communist revolt of 1932 Lincoln: University of Nebraska Press
- Political Handbook of the world, 1944 New York, 1945
- Williams, Philip J. and Knut Walter (1997) Militarization and demilitarization in El Salvador's transition to democracy Pittsburgh: University of Pittsburgh Press
