= National Pro Patria Party =

Defunct political party of El Salvador

National Party of the Fatherland Partido Nacional "Pro-Patria"
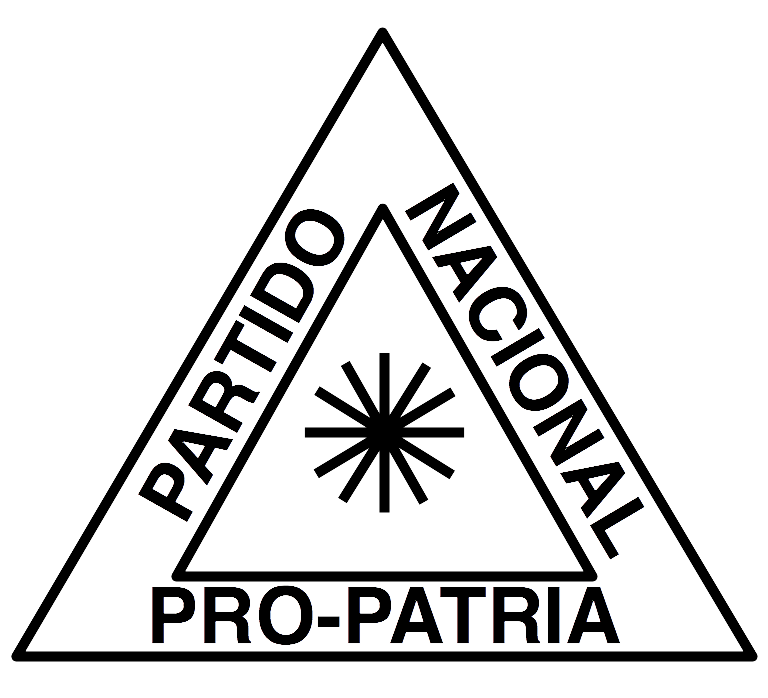
- Abbreviation: PNPP
- Leader: Maximiliano Hernández Martínez
- Founded: July 1933
- Dissolved: 1945
- Preceded by: National Republican Party
- Headquarters: San Salvador
- Ideology: Fascism; Anti-communism; Conservatism; Agrarian oligarchy
- Political position: Far-right
- Religion: Catholicism
- Colors: Blue
- Slogan: "Paz, Orden, Justicia, y Probidad"; (English: "Peace, Order, Justice, and Probity")

Party flag

The National Party of the Fatherland (Spanish: Partido Nacional "Pro-Patria"), usually translated as the National Pro Patria Party or simply the Pro Patria Party, was a far-right political party which was the sole-legal political party in El Salvador from its establishment in 1933 until its dissolution in 1945. The party was founded by President General Maximiliano Hernández Martínez to support his government.

== History ==
The National Pro Patria Party was founded in July 1933 by General Maximiliano Hernández Martínez, the acting president of El Salvador, to support his presidential campaign for the upcoming 1935 presidential election. The National Pro Patria Party was the country's sole-legal political party. The party was governed by the supreme council, which was composed of Hernández Martínez, members of his cabinet, and other high ranking government officials. It had its first meeting in July 1933.

In the 1935 election, Hernández Martínez was the only candidate, winning all 329,555 votes. He again ran unopposed in the 1939 presidential election, where he again won all 210,810 votes, and again in 1944, however, no results were published.

After an attempted coup and widespread student protests against his government, Hernández Martínez resigned and fled the country in May 1944. He was succeeded by Andrés Ignacio Menéndez, but he was deposed by Osmín Aguirre y Salinas in October 1944, ending the rule of the National Pro Patria Party. The party was declared to be dissolved by the Salvadoran government in 1945.

== Electoral history ==
=== Presidential elections ===
Election	Party candidate	Votes	%	Pos.	Result	Ref
1935	Maximiliano Hernández Martínez	329,555	100.00	▲1st	Elected ✓	
1939	Maximiliano Hernández Martínez	42	100.00	1st	Elected ✓	
1944	Maximiliano Hernández Martínez	No results published		1st	Elected ✓	
1945	Did not participate					

=== Legislative Assembly elections ===
Election	Party leader	Votes	%	Position	Seats	+/–	Status in legislature	Ref
1936	Maximiliano Hernández Martínez	No results published		▲1st	42 / 42	▲42	Sole legal party	
1939	Maximiliano Hernández Martínez	210,810	100.00	1st	42 / 42	0	Sole legal party	
1944	Maximiliano Hernández Martínez	No results published		1st	42 / 42	0	Sole legal party	
