= Maximiliano Hernández Martínez =

President of El Salvador from 1931 to 1934 and 1935 to 1944

Brigadier General Maximiliano Hernández Martínez
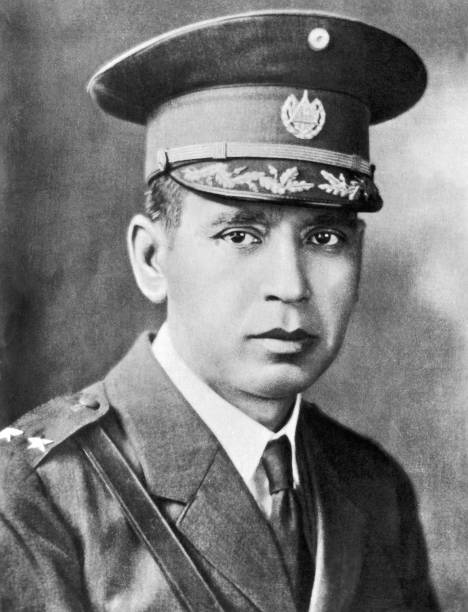

27th President of El Salvador
- In office 1 March 1935 – 9 May 1944
- Preceded by: Andrés Ignacio Menéndez
- Succeeded by: Andrés Ignacio Menéndez
- In office 4 December 1931 – 28 August 1934; Provisional President
- Preceded by: Arturo Araujo
- Succeeded by: Andrés Ignacio Menéndez

31st Vice President of El Salvador
- In office 1 March 1931 – 28 August 1934
- President: Arturo Araujo; Himself (provisional)
- Preceded by: Gustavo Vides
- Succeeded by: Manuel Adriano Vilanova

28th Minister of War, the Navy, and Aviation of El Salvador
- In office 29 August 1934 – 1 March 1935
- President: Andrés Ignacio Menéndez (provisional)
- Preceded by: Andrés Ignacio Menéndez (acting)
- Succeeded by: Andrés Ignacio Menéndez
- In office 1 March 1931 – 1 December 1931
- President: Arturo Araujo
- Preceded by: Pío Romero Bosque Molina
- Succeeded by: Salvador López Rochac

Personal details
- Born: 21 October 1882 San Matías, El Salvador
- Died: 15 May 1966 (aged 83) Jamastrán, Honduras
- Cause of death: Assassination (stab wounds)
- Party: National Pro Patria Party (1933–1944)
- Other political affiliations: National Republican Party (1930–1931)
- Spouse: Concepción Monteagudo
- Children: 8
- Education: University of El Salvador
- Occupation: Military officer, politician

Military service
- Allegiance: El Salvador
- Branch/service: Salvadoran Army
- Rank: Brigadier general
- Battles/wars: Third Totoposte War; 1931 Salvadoran coup d'état; La Matanza; Palm Sunday Coup; Strike of Fallen Arms

Maximiliano Hernández Martínez (21 October 1882 – 15 May 1966) was a Salvadoran military officer and politician who served as the 27th president of El Salvador from 4 December 1931 to 28 August 1934 in a provisional capacity and again in an official capacity from 1 March 1935 until his resignation on 9 May 1944. Martínez was the leader of El Salvador during most of World War II.

Martínez began his military career in the Salvadoran Army, attended the Polytechnic School of Guatemala, and attained the rank of brigadier general by 1919. He ran for president during the 1931 presidential election but withdrew his candidacy and instead endorsed Labor Party candidate Arturo Araujo, who selected Martínez to serve as his vice president and later minister of war. After the Salvadoran military overthrew Araujo in December 1931, the military junta established by the coup plotters, known as the Civic Directory, named Martínez as the country's provisional president. His presidency was not recognized by the United States or other Central American countries until January 1934. The 1931 coup and Martínez's succession to the presidency allowed for the rise of a series of military dictatorships that held onto power in El Salvador until 1979.

Martinez served as president of El Salvador for more than 12 years, making him the longest-serving president in Salvadoran history, and his presidency is sometimes referred to as the Martinato. In January 1932, shortly after assuming the presidency, Martínez crushed a communist and indigenous rebellion. The mass killings committed by the Salvadoran military police following the rebellion's suppression have since been referred to as La Matanza ("The Massacre") and resulted in the deaths of between 10,000 and 40,000 peasants. Martínez ruled El Salvador as a totalitarian one-party state led by the National Pro Patria Party, a political party he established in 1933 to support his 1935 presidential election campaign. The 1935, 1939 and 1944 presidential elections were uncontested, and Martínez received every vote cast. Martínez established the Central Reserve Bank and engaged in infrastructure projects such as building the Pan-American Highway in El Salvador, building the Cuscatlán Bridge in central El Salvador, and inaugurating the Nacional Flor Blanca stadium, which held the 1935 Central American and Caribbean Games. The Salvadoran economy almost exclusively relied on coffee production and exports during Martínez's presidency, particularly to Germany and the United States. El Salvador joined the Allied powers of World War II and declared war on Germany, Italy, and Japan in December 1941. Following an attempted coup in April 1944 and massive civil unrest following the execution of the coup's leaders, Martínez resigned as president in May 1944, and he and his family fled the country. In 1966, Martínez was killed in exile at his home in Honduras by his taxi driver following a labor dispute.

Martínez remains a controversial figure in El Salvador. Martínez was described as a fascist and admired the European fascist movements such as those in Germany and Italy. During the lead-up to World War II, he and many of his government officials held sympathies for the Nazis and Axis powers; however, sympathizers were later purged from the government after El Salvador joined the war on the side of the Allies. Martínez was a theosophist, believed in the occult, and had a number of religious and personal beliefs his contemporaries considered unorthodox. During the Salvadoran Civil War (1979–1992), a death squad named after him claimed responsibility for the assassinations of several left-wing politicians.

== Early life ==
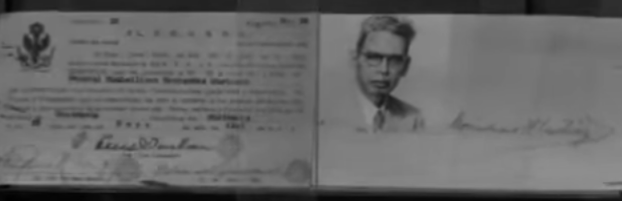
Martínez's military identification card at the Military Museum of El Salvador

Maximiliano Hernández Martínez was born on 21 October 1882 in San Matías, El Salvador. His parents were Raymundo Hernández and Petronila Martínez. Martínez (Note: Maximiliano Hernández Martínez is commonly referred to in El Salvador as General "Martínez" (using his maternal surname) rather than General "Hernández" (using his paternal surname), but he is sometimes referred to as General "Hernández Martínez" (using both of his surnames).) earned his bachelor's degree in San Salvador, El Salvador's capital city, after which he enrolled in the Polytechnic School of Guatemala, a military academy where he earned the rank of sub-lieutenant. He returned to El Salvador and attended the Jurisprudence and Social Sciences Faculty at the University of El Salvador; however, he abandoned his studies in favor of pursuing a military career.

Martínez was promoted to the rank of lieutenant on 17 November 1903 and to captain on 23 August 1906. He was promoted to major captain that same year during the Third Totoposte War against Guatemala, where he fought under former Salvadoran president and General Tomás Regalado. He was promoted to lieutenant colonel on 6 May 1909 and to colonel on 15 June 1914. The Legislative Assembly promoted Martínez to the rank of brigadier general on 14 July 1919, and President Jorge Meléndez officially sanctioned his promotion on 17 September. Martínez was later employed as a professor at the Captain General Gerardo Barrios Military School, and held various positions within the army. He became the military school's director in 1930.

== 1931 election and vice presidency ==
El Salvador had a presidential election in 1931. Every election prior to that date had been held with a pre-designated winner; however, President Pío Romero Bosque decided in spring 1930 to hold free and fair elections for 1931. This led to numerous candidates registering presidential campaigns. Romero did not endorse any specific candidate. Martínez was among the candidates, resigning his position as second inspector general of the army on 28 May 1930 in order to run for president. Martínez attempted to rally popular support by taking socialist political positions. His campaign was supported by the National Republican Party, a minor political party.

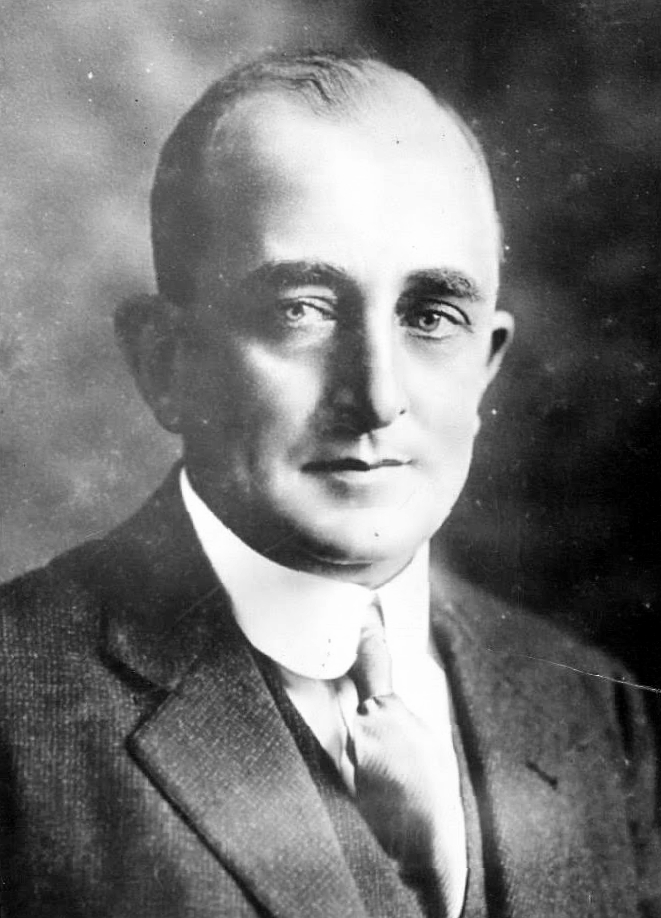
Arturo Araujo, under whom Martínez served as vice president and minister of war

Ultimately, after receiving little support, Martínez withdrew his presidential candidacy and supported Arturo Araujo of the Labor Party, expecting that Araujo would award him the vice presidency. The National Republican Party withdrew its support for Martínez after his withdrawal and endorsement of Araujo. During the election, Araujo won 106,777 votes (46.7 percent), (Note: According to Kenneth Grieb, Araujo won around 101,000 votes.) but did not win an outright majority of the votes cast. Martínez's endorsement probably did not sway many voters. As set out in the constitution of El Salvador, the Legislative Assembly convened on 12 February 1931 to select a president. The legislature unanimously voted in favor of declaring Araujo the election's winner after he promised to reimburse the campaign costs for two other presidential candidates – Alberto Gómez Zárate and Enrique Córdova – in order to satisfy them and their supporters in the legislature.

Araujo then selected Martínez to be his vice president, partly because he believed Martínez would support his policies, and partly to ensure the army's loyalty. Additionally, Araujo selected Martínez on the condition he would marry Araujo's mistress, Concepción "Concha" Monteagudo. Araujo and Martínez both assumed office on 1 March. In addition to the vice presidency, Araujo also appointed Martínez to serve as Minister of War, the Navy, and Aviation and appointed General Andrés Ignacio Menéndez to serve as Martínez's deputy. Upon assuming office, Martínez purged military leadership and promoted officers loyal to both himself and the government. Ongoing economic problems caused by the Great Depression and the ensuing unrest persisted through Araujo's presidency, leading to Martínez using his position as minister of war to quell protests. While suppressing anti-government protests, Martínez led a group of military officers in June 1931 demanding Araujo repeal the "red code" law, that allowed the president to try and execute military officers for attempting a coup. They also demanded Araujo reinstate the military's "right to insurrection". Araujo rejected their demands.

== Rise to power ==
=== 1931 coup and appointment as president ===
In late 1931, Araujo attempted to reduce the military's budget in order to improve the government's financial situation, but the army's officers refused to comply with Araujo's proposed budget cut. Araujo's government had failed to pay the military's officers and enlisted men for several months. On 1 December 1931, Araujo removed Martínez as minister of war, after questioning his loyalty, and replaced him with Salvador López Rochac, Araujo's brother-in-law. On 2 December, due to the government's failure to pay the military's wages and Martínez's removal, a group of junior officers overthrew Araujo, forced him to flee the country to Guatemala, and arrested many of the army's senior officers.

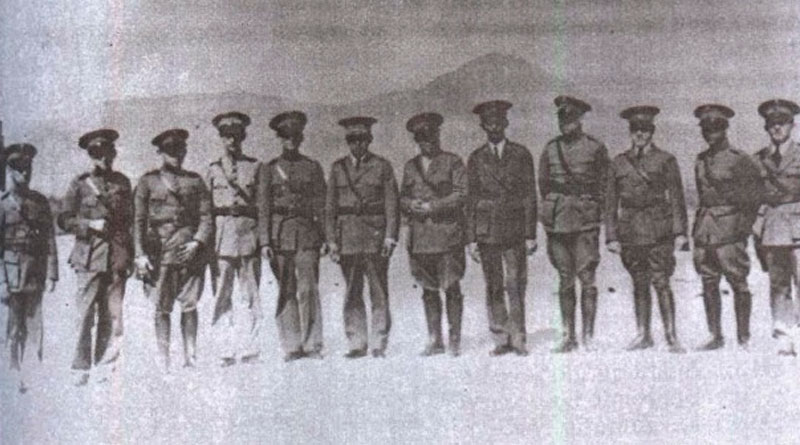
The Civic Directory of December 1931; Martínez is the 6th from the left.

The coup leaders established the Civic Directory, and two of its officers—Colonel Osmín Aguirre y Salinas (who replaced López Rochac as minister of war) and Colonel Joaquín Valdés—assumed the role of co-chairmen of the Civic Directory. The entire Civic Directory itself consisted of twelve military officers from the army, the air force, and the National Guard. The Civic Directory approached Martínez and offered to install him as president of El Salvador, and Martínez accepted. On 4 December, the Civic Directory dissolved itself, declared Araujo had abandoned the presidency, and officially appointed Martínez to serve as the country's provisional president, while he was still serving as vice president. Although Martínez consolidated his power as provisional president, he did not restore himself as minister of war, instead appointing Valdés to the office. Martínez also appointed General Salvador Castaneda Castro as minister of government, promotion, agriculture, labor, sanitation, and charity; Colonel José Asencio Menéndez as sub-secretary of war, the navy, and aviation; Doctor Arturo Ramón Ávila as sub-secretary of foreign relations and justice; Pedro Salvador Fonseca as sub-secretary of finance, public credit, industry, and commerce; and Doctor Benjamín Orozco as sub-secretary of public instruction.

Martínez's role in the coup remains unclear. His supporters claimed the Civic Directory simply appointed him as provisional president in accordance with the constitution's provisions for replacing an incumbent in the event they left the country, while his opponents claimed Martínez organized the coup himself. The United States ambassador to El Salvador, Charles B. Curtis, believed the organizers of the coup installed Martínez as a figurehead in order to legitimize the coup and continue exerting power. Joaquín Castro Canizales, a Salvadoran poet and journalist, told American historian Thomas P. Anderson that Martínez had no advanced knowledge of the coup, but that he did know many military officers were dissatisfied with Araujo's government. General Salvador Peña Trejo stated Martínez knew the military was plotting something but he did not know any exact details. He further added that Martínez took advantage of the coup in order to assume the presidency. Meanwhile, in a 1968 interview, Araujo himself stated "it was General Martínez who secretly directed the move that brought him to power [...] I do not believe that other members of the my government, honorable men, were involved". Contemporary Salvadoran leftists also believed Martínez organized the coup. The Estrella Roja newspaper of the Communist Party of El Salvador praised the coup as "heroic and necessary" but also voiced concern that Martínez would not be able to solve the country's economic crisis.

=== International recognition ===
The Legislative Assembly confirmed Martínez as president of El Salvador in 1932, and designated him to serve the remainder of Araujo's term ending in 1935. On 8 June 1932, Martínez confirmed he would stay in office until 1935, after reportedly receiving 2,600 petitions containing thousands of signatures that requested he do so in April 1932. Although Martínez's government was recognized by the Legislative Assembly, his government did not receive recognition from Costa Rica, Guatemala, Honduras, Nicaragua, or the United States due to the terms of the 1923 Central American Treaty of Peace and Amity. Article 2 of the treaty stipulated that all its signatories (Note: The signatories of the 1923 Central American Treaty of Peace and Amity included Costa Rica, El Salvador, Guatemala, Honduras, and Nicaragua.) would not recognize governments that assumed power through undemocratic means, such as a coup d'état.

In September 1932, Martínez's government received formal recognition from France, Italy, and the United Kingdom. Martínez denounced the 1923 treaty on 26 December 1932, three days after Costa Rica did. Costa Rica recognized Martínez's government on 3 January 1934, as did Guatemala, Honduras, and Nicaragua on 24 January. The United States recognized Martínez's government on 26 January after Martínez's victory in the 1935 presidential election and after all the signatories to the 1923 treaty had recognized his government.

== Presidency ==
=== La Matanza ===
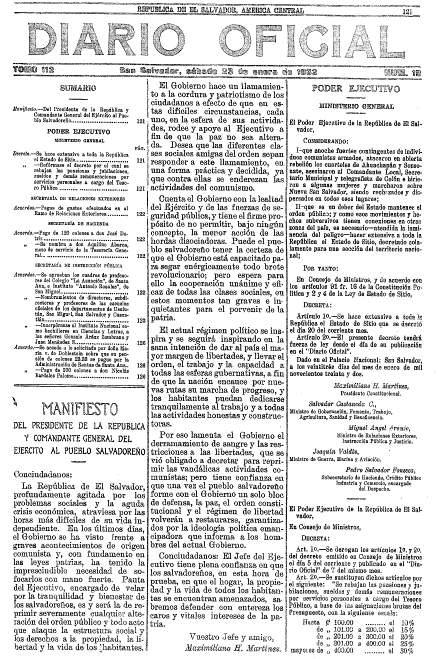
Martínez's manifesto regarding the rebellion, published in the Diario Oficial government newspaper

Araujo's government had scheduled municipal and legislative elections for 15 December 1931. After his overthrow, the military postponed the municipal elections to 3 to 5 January and the legislative elections to 10 to 12 January 1932. They promised the elections would be free and fair, and allowed all political parties to participate, including the Communist Party. When the municipal elections took place, municipalities where the Communist Party won had their results suspended by the government. In the subsequent legislative election the following week, after early results indicated a Communist Party victory in the department of San Salvador, the official results published on 21 January announced three non-communists had won the department's three legislative seats. Violence between the National Guard, communists, and civilians persisted throughout both the municipal and legislative election processes. The government ultimately canceled the results of both elections.

The results of the municipal elections led to the Communist Party believing it could no longer come to power through democratic means. According to communist Abel Cuenca, the party began plotting a rebellion against Martínez's government on 9 January. Communist Ismael Hernández believed the United States would support the rebellion, confusing it for a pro-Araujo counterrevolution. A delegation of Communist Party leaders met Valdés and threatened to launch a rebellion unless the government made "substantial contributions to the welfare of the peasants", but the government rejected the communists' demands. On 15 January, the Guatemalan government arrested communist leader Juan Pablo Wainwright for supposedly planning to launch a revolution in Central America. The Salvadoran government arrested communist leaders Farabundo Martí, Mario Zapata, and Alfonso Luna in San Salvador on 19 January, and the arrests may have been prompted by Wainwright's arrest four days prior. The arrests of Martí, Zapata, and Luna were made public the following day.

On 22 January 1932, thousands of peasants led by Francisco Sánchez in western El Salvador—armed with sticks, machetes, and "poor quality" firearms—launched a rebellion against Martínez's government. A group of indigenous Salvadorans known as the Pipils, led by Feliciano Ama, joined the communist rebels because they were sympathetic to their ideology and believed victory was assured. Communist and Pipil rebels attacked and captured the towns and cities of Colón, Jayaque, Juayúa, Izalco, Nahuizalco, Salcoatitán, Sonzacate, Tacuba, and Teotepeque. In the process, the rebels killed various politicians, military officers, and landowners; looted and destroyed various buildings; and attempted to sever military communications between the captured towns and the cities of Ahuachapán, Santa Ana, and Sonsonate. The initial rebellion resulted in the deaths of around fifty to seventy rebels, five soldiers, and ten police officers. General José Tomás Calderón estimated there were around 70–80,000 rebels overall.

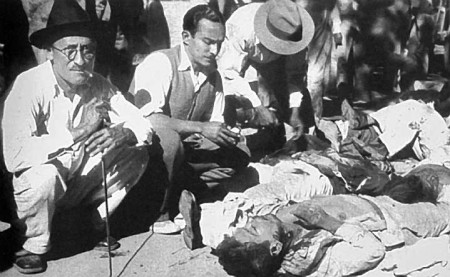
Dead bodies of people killed by the army during La Matanza

On 23 January 1932, Martínez published a manifesto regarding the rebellion in the Diario Oficial, the government's official newspaper. In the manifesto, he stated it was necessary to "suffocate [the rebels] with a strong hand" ("sofocarlos con mano fuerte") and promised to restore peace and constitutional order. The following day, the government declared martial law, and the army was mobilized to crush the rebellion. By 25 January, the rebellion had been suppressed, and the army had regained control of all the towns captured by the rebels. After the rebellion had been completely suppressed, the army began reprisals against peasants in western El Salvador, especially targeting the Pipil. The indiscriminate killing of civilians continued until mid-February 1932, once the government determined the region had been sufficiently pacified. As the killings disproportionately affected the Pipil population, some scholars have referred to the event as an ethnocide or a genocide.

Many of the rebellion's leaders were executed during the government's mass killings: Sánchez was executed by firing squad on 25 January 1932; Ama was lynched on 28 January; and Martí, Zapata, and Luna were executed by firing squad on 1 February, following a show trial. In total, 10–40,000 people were killed by the military, and the event has since become known as La Matanza ("The Massacre"). To provide clarity in the aftermath of the conflict, the Legislative Assembly issued Legislative Decree No. 121 on 11 July. The decree granted unconditional amnesty to anyone who committed crimes of any nature in order to "restore order, repress, persecute, punish and capture those accused of the crime of rebellion of this year" ("restablecimiento del orden, represión, persecución, castigo y captura de los sindicados en el delito derebelión").

Martínez's government had knowledge that the rebellion was going to occur, as plans regarding it were discovered on 18 January, and on 21 January, the government had instructed newspapers to report a rebellion would occur the following day. Cuenca believed Martínez intentionally allowed the rebellion to happen; he theorized that by preventing social and political change from occurring, Martínez provoked the rebellion, believing it was doomed to fail. Mauricio de la Selva, a Salvadoran poet and communist, expanded on the theory, believing Martínez wanted to forcefully crush the communist rebellion in order to win over the United States' recognition of his government and to portray himself as the "champion of anti-communism". Doctor Alejandro D. Marroquín, a professor at the University of El Salvador, argued Martínez actually feared the Labor Party launching a pro-Araujo rebellion and an invasion from Guatemala more than the communist rebellion. Marroquín believed Martínez, by crushing the communist rebellion, hoped to deprive Araujo of rebels who could have supported his own counterrevolution.

=== Economic policies ===
Upon assuming office, Martínez's government assumed control over the country's economy in an attempt to mitigate the economic situation that ultimately resulted in Araujo's overthrow. In January 1932, Martínez appointed Miguel Tomás Molina as his minister of finance in an effort to establish confidence in the country's financial stability and integrity. Martínez's government then proceeded to make large budget reductions in anticipation of reduced government revenue. The government also reduced interest rates by 40 percent, granted extensions to individuals who were unable to repay their loans, and cut the wages of civil servants—with the exception of military personnel—by 30 percent.

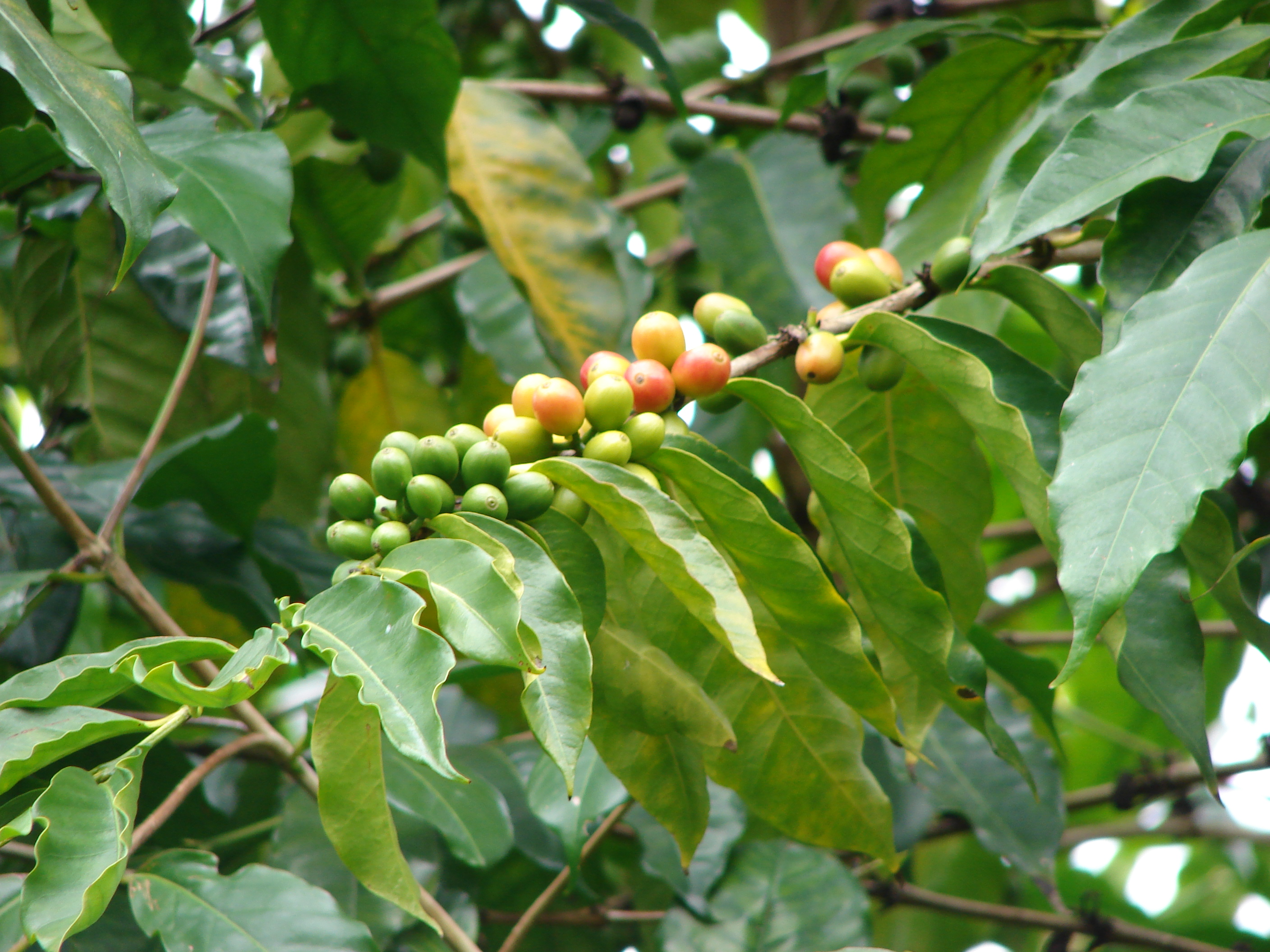
Arabica coffee, of which production and exports composed most of the Salvadoran economy throughout Martínez's presidency

On 23 February 1932, the Salvadoran government suspended repayments of a 1922 loan from American and British lenders, partly because of Martínez's frustration with failing to receive recognition from the United States shortly after he assumed power. After renegotiations in 1932 and 1936, the government resumed repayment of its 1922 loan. However, the government suspended repayments again in 1933 for political reasons and from 1937 to 1946 due to a fall in coffee prices. The loan was fully paid off in 1960. In June 1937, Martínez announced the implementation of the "Martínez Doctrine" to the Legislative Assembly, which held "the government [will] never again contract new loans", and his quote was commemorated on a bronze plaque inside the Legislative Assembly building.

On 12 March 1932, Martínez implemented the Moratory Law that suspended the government's payments of all public and private domestic debts. He passed the law in order to support coffee companies, such as the Salvadoran Coffee Company, that were struggling after the collapse in coffee prices. Throughout Martínez's presidency, the Salvadoran economy almost entirely relied on coffee production and exports, specifically Arabica coffee. From 1929 to 1936, Germany was the largest importer of Salvadoran coffee. After the implementation of the "Foreigners' Special Accounts for Inland Payments" policy in Germany, designed to collect debts owed to it by foreign countries, the United States became the largest importer of Salvadoran coffee as the Salvadoran government sought a more financially beneficial trading partner. El Salvador also benefited from free-trade agreements implemented by Cordell Hull, the United States Secretary of State. In 1937, El Salvador and the United States signed the Commercial Agreement of 1937 that granted El Salvador tariff exemptions on coffee exports. From 1940 to 1944, coffee comprised 98 percent of all Salvadoran exports to the United States. Although El Salvador's exports to Germany decreased in 1936, its imports from Germany significantly increased from 1935 to 1937.

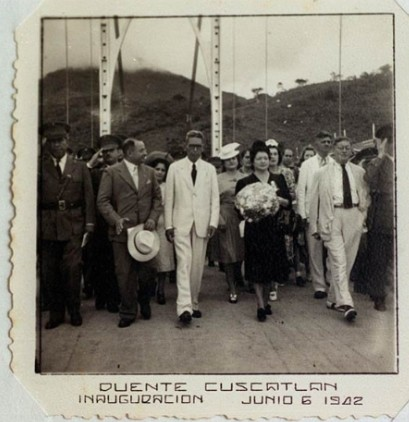
Martínez (center) at the inauguration of the Cuscatlán Bridge in 1942

On 30 June 1932, Martínez's government began constructing the 300 kilometers (190 mi) of the Pan-American Highway, that would span the country from east to west. He inaugurated the Estadio Nacional Flor Blanca (now known as the Estadio Jorge "El Mágico" González) in San Salvador on 1 March 1935; the stadium hosted the 3rd Central American and Caribbean Games, that began on 16 March. In 1942, Martínez inaugurated the Cuscatlán Bridge, that crossed the Lempa River in central El Salvador.

Martínez established the Central Reserve Bank on 19 June 1934 in order to monopolize the right to issue currency, taking away this right from El Salvador's three largest private banks: the Salvadoran Bank, the Commercial Agricultural Bank, and the Western Bank. Martínez's government consulted the Bank of England for advice when establishing the Central Reserve Bank. The bank had the exclusive right to print money, import and export gold, and control foreign exchange rates; it pegged the Salvadoran colón at 2.5 colones to the United States dollar. The bank began issuing currency on 31 August. On 8 January 1935, Martínez established the Mortgage Bank to completely replace the country's three largest private banks' ability to offer loans to coffee companies. He also established the Rural Credit Box to give credits to rural peasants.

=== Elections and constitutional changes ===
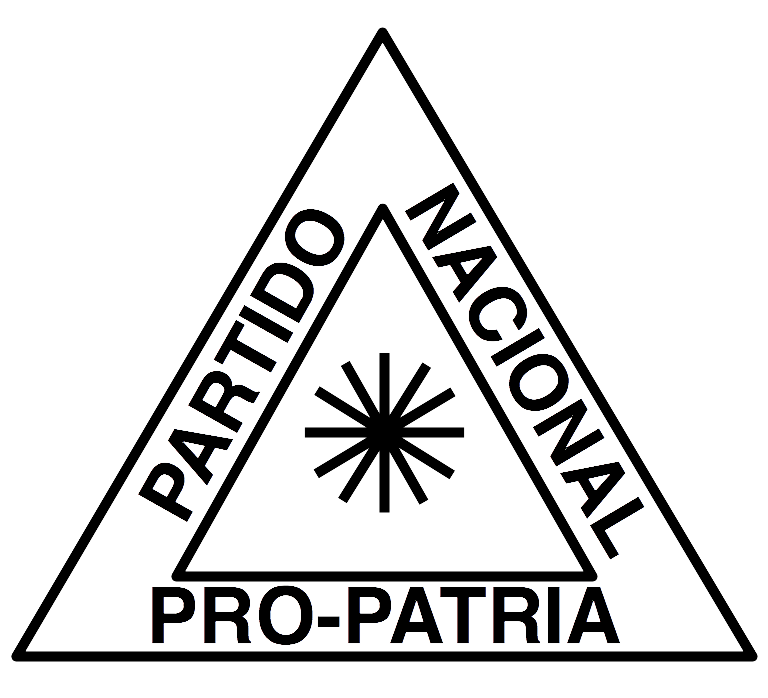
Emblem of the National Pro Patria Party

In June 1933, Martínez announced his intention to be elected as president of El Salvador in the upcoming 1935 presidential election. He established the National Pro Patria Party (officially the "National Party of the Fatherland") to promote his presidential campaign. In February 1932, he had established a network of informants known as the National Pro Patria Legion within the military, police, and intelligence agencies, with the informants themselves known as orejas ("ears"). The informants spied on and monitored individuals for potential political dissidence, including members of his own government. In 1937, the National Pro Patria Legion was renamed the Civic Guards. In 1941, Martínez later promoted the formation of militias within the National Pro Patria Party. The National Pro Patria Party was the only legal political party in El Salvador, and all politicians in elected or appointed offices had to be members of the party.

Martínez resigned as president and vice president on 28 August 1934, after seeking permission from the Legislative Assembly to focus on his presidential campaign, and was succeeded by Menéndez in a provisional capacity. Menéndez had been appointed by Martínez as his minister of war, and was one of Martínez's closest allies. After this, Martínez became Menéndez's minister of war. During the election, Martínez won all 329,555 votes cast, as he ran unopposed. Martínez was inaugurated for his second term on 1 March 1935.

In August 1938, Martínez announced his intention to seek re-election to a third term as president. Several government officials, such as Molina, General Manuel Castaneda, Doctor Maximiliano Brannon (sub-secretary of finance), and Augustín Alfaro (chief audit officer), resigned their positions in protest at Martínez's announcement, accusing him of continuismo. (Note: Continuismo is the practice of incumbent democratically-elected leaders attempting to extend their term in office beyond legal limitations and restrictions through means such as introducing constitutional amendments or abolishing term limits.) They eventually joined the political opposition. Some military officers—led by Colonel Ascencio Menéndez, Colonel Felipe Calderón, and Lieutenant René Glower Valdivieso—began plotting to overthrow Martínez, but the government discovered the plot in January 1939 and arrested its leaders. They were later exiled to Mexico, together with other opposition leaders.

Martínez repealed the Salvadoran constitution of 1886, and the Legislative Assembly ratified a new constitution on 1 March 1939. Although Martínez's 1939 constitution prohibited re-election just as the 1886 constitution had done, it explicitly granted Martínez an exemption to seek re-election. It also prevented his immediate and extended family from running for office and succeeding him. The same day that the new constitution was ratified, rather than being re-elected through a popular vote, the Legislative Assembly voted to re-elect Martínez to serve a five-year term. Another new constitution was ratified on 1 March 1944 to allow him to be re-elected for a fourth term. That same day, as in 1939, the Legislative Assembly re-elected him to a fourth term rather than compelling him to be re-elected through the popular vote. His fourth term would have lasted until 1950. Martínez was the last president in Salvadoran history to be re-elected until President Nayib Bukele won re-election in the 2024 presidential election.

=== Social policies ===
In 1932, Martínez revoked the autonomy previously granted to the University of El Salvador, putting it under direct government control. His action led to students and professors protesting against the decision, and the government restored the university's autonomy in 1934. Martínez revoked the university's autonomy again in 1938, resulting in students going on strike and refusing to attend classes. These protests were suppressed by 1939 without major resistance, and students eventually returned to the university.

In 1934, Martínez implemented laws that discriminated against Arabic, Chinese, and indigenous minorities in the country. More discriminatory laws were implemented in 1939, restricting the activities Arabic, Chinese, and Lebanese minorities could participate in and where they could work. Further laws discriminating against Arabs and Chinese minorities were implemented in 1943. Blacks were also forbidden from entering the country.

The Salvadoran constitution of 1939 implemented several new laws and restrictions on civil liberties. The constitution prohibited the possession of firearms, explosives, and bullets; the consumption of alcoholic beverages and tobacco; and the usage of matches and all types of fossil fuel. The constitution also allowed the government to expropriate private property without prior notice to build new highways or for military purposes. It also mandated a government monopoly over all radio broadcasting in the country. Other laws not in the constitution also prohibited several civil liberties. Games involving playing cards, dice, ribbons, and thimbles were banned, as were wheel of fortune, roulette, and all games involving luck or random chance. Playing billiards was permitted, but children, students, and servants were forbidden from playing, and laborers were not allowed to play during the weekdays unless it was after 6 p.m. The use of machines in the manufacture of shoes and other types of clothing was banned in an effort to promote the learning of trades.

=== Ideology and foreign affairs ===
In May 1937, Frank P. Corrigan, the United States ambassador to El Salvador, wrote a letter to Hull stating Martínez had "gained the approval of the greater part of the people", allowed for "free expression of opinion if he considers it well intentioned and not subversive", and believed Martínez had not become a dictator in an "opprobrious sense". His opinion of Martínez changed after he openly began praising the works of totalitarian governments in Europe and told Hull to work to discourage the "beginning of a Dictatorship" in El Salvador. In mid-1938, Fay Allen Des Portes, the United States ambassador to Guatemala, told Hull he had received reports that Martínez had "turned Fascist in the letter and the spirit". After Manuel Castaneda left Martínez's government in 1939, he accused Martínez of being the most "anti-democratic" leader in the Americas and that he had shifted the economy in favor of "Nazi-Fascist Imperialism".

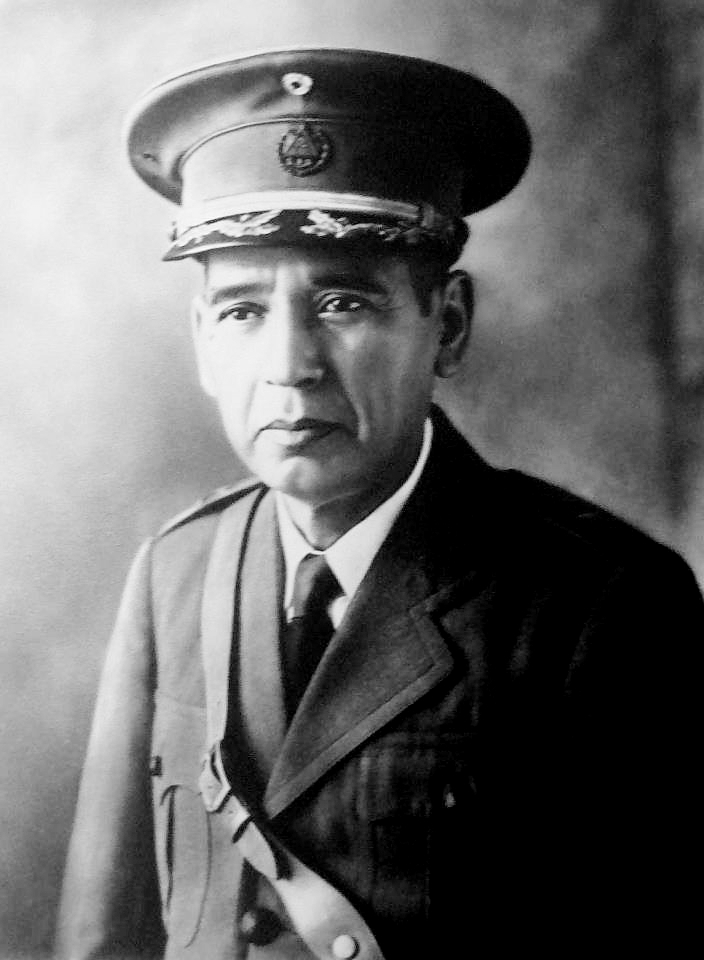
Martínez in 1940

Martínez personally admired fascist movements in Germany and Italy. He also believed corporatism was the ideal system of government and it should be implemented in El Salvador. Martínez sought to emulate the economic success of European dictators such as Adolf Hitler in Germany and Benito Mussolini in Italy. He compared himself to Hitler and Mussolini, believing the three of them all saved their countries from communism. Martínez permitted Spanish priests with fascist sympathies to instruct schoolchildren and teach them how to perform the Roman salute. In 1936, Martínez's government was among the first to recognize Francisco Franco as the legitimate ruler of Spain during the Spanish Civil War, even before Germany and Italy had done so. Martínez also recognized the independence of Manchukuo, a Japanese puppet state controlling territory in northeastern China. Martínez was personally sympathetic to the Axis powers.

In 1938, the Salvadoran Air Force attempted to purchase bombers from North American Aviation but the company refused to accept coffee as payment. Instead, the air force purchased four Caproni AP.1 bombers from Italy and partially paid for them with coffee. Italy sent El Salvador a flight instructor to train new pilots, and additionally, El Salvador sent four pilots to Italy to receive training at the Turin Academy of War. Martínez also purchased thirty-two 75 mm guns from Italy.

Martínez appointed several Nazi sympathizers to some prominent government and military positions. When he established the Mortgage Bank, Martínez appointed German banker Baron Wilhelm von Hundelshausen as the bank's manager and Héctor Herrera, one of Hundelshausen's acquaintances, as the bank's president. Commander W. R. Phillips, a United States military attaché in the Panama Canal Zone, believed Hundelshausen was promoting Nazi Party meetings in El Salvador; and was supporting the Salvadoran government hoping it would overthrow the Honduran government, annex the country, and eventually unify Central America under Martínez. Phillips also accused Hundelshausen of being responsible for the spread of pro-German propaganda pamphlets and newspaper advertisements in El Salvador. On 24 April 1938, Martínez appointed German Major General Eberhardt Bohnstedt to serve as the director of the Captain General Gerardo Barrios Military School, as an instructor, and as a military advisor. Colonel Juan Merino, the director of the National Guard, and various other Salvadoran military officers also held Nazi sympathies. Newspapers such as Diario Co Latino, El Diario de Hoy, and La Prensa Gráfica were censored, not only for publishing messages critical of Martínez's government but also for publishing anti-Axis messages. Many journalists were also exiled from the country.

=== World War II ===
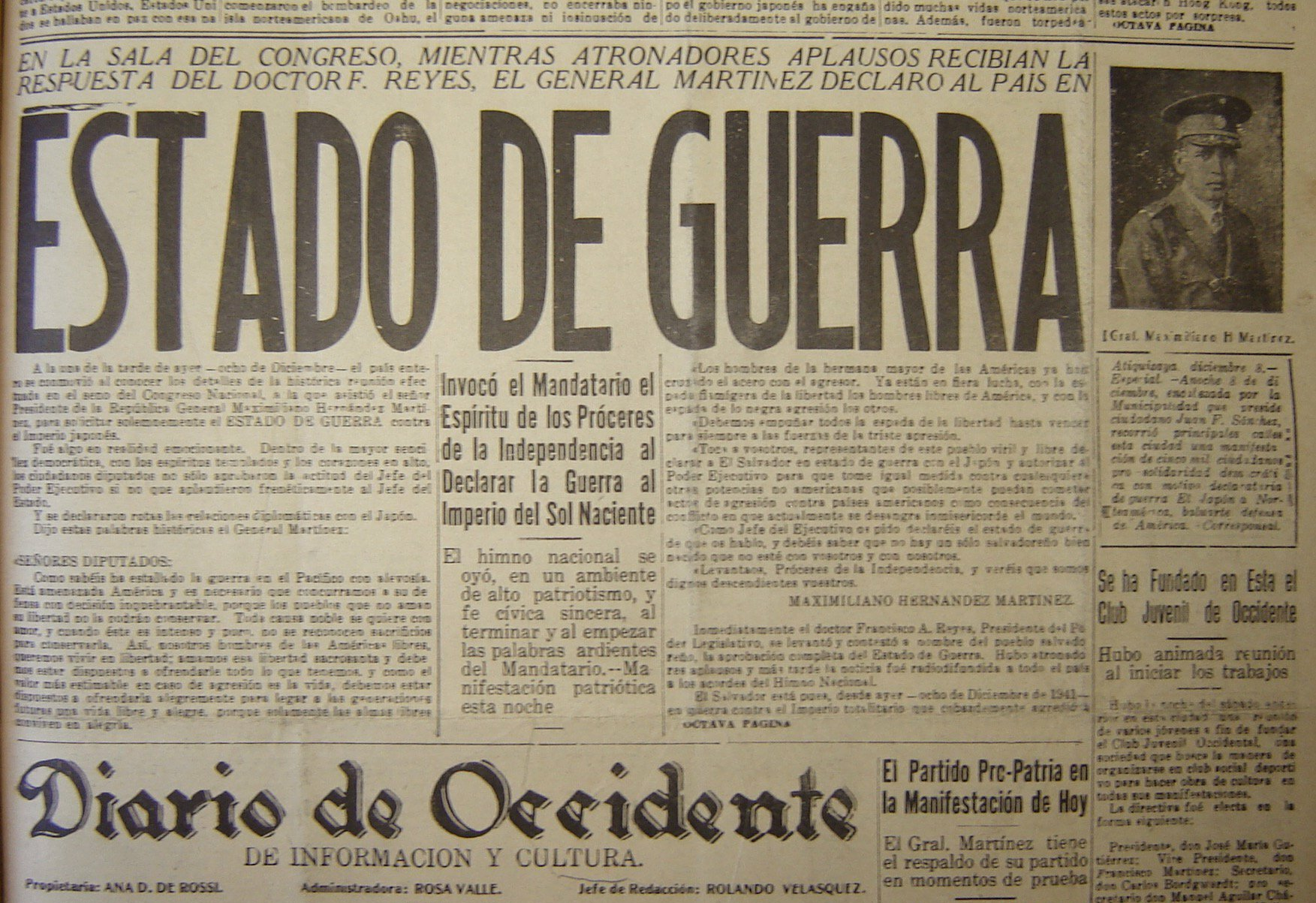
Diario de Occidente reporting on El Salvador's declaration of war on Japan

Despite Martínez's personal sympathies with fascism, he continued to reiterate his commitment to democracy, his opposition to totalitarianism, and his support for the United States. Beginning in 1940, he began to crackdown on Nazi activity in El Salvador, and even suppressed a fascist demonstration based on the Italian Blackshirts on 10 June 1940, the day Italy joined World War II on the side of the Axis powers. Although Martínez and many of his government officials supported fascist ideals, the majority of the Salvadoran population did not. In September 1939, both Hundelshausen and Bohnstedt resigned from their positions due to open public opposition to their appointments.

After the outbreak of World War II, Salvadoran exports to Germany diminished significantly, pushing El Salvador to form closer economic ties with the United States. In 1940, the United States sent military advisors to El Salvador to inspect the state of the armed forces. On 27 March 1941, Martínez appointed American Lieutenant Colonel Robert L. Christian to serve as director of the Captain General Gerardo Barrios Military School. Christian was succeeded by American Lieutenant Colonel Rufus E. Byers on 21 May 1943. On 8 December 1941, after the Japanese attack on Pearl Harbor, El Salvador declared war on Japan. This was followed by declarations of war on both Germany and Italy on 12 December.

In 1942, Martínez dismissed all ministers who held Nazi sympathies. He also ordered the arrests of several German, Japanese, and Italian nationals in El Salvador and interned them at the National Police headquarters. The "Martínez Doctrine" was temporarily suspended in December 1941 during World War II in order for El Salvador to benefit from the Lend-Lease Act promoted by the United States. While El Salvador sent laborers to the Panama Canal Zone to maintain the Panama Canal, it did not send any soldiers to fight directly against the Axis powers.

== Fall from power ==
From 1935 to 1939, there were five coup attempts to overthrow Martínez. Three were discovered before they could be executed, and the other two were crushed during the attempt. In August 1943, some opposition politicians, military officers, and anti-fascist activists began plotting to overthrow Martínez, but several of the plotters were arrested in late 1943. Shortly afterwards, Ernesto Interiano was killed by the police during an attempted assassination of Martínez in a lone wolf attack.

=== Palm Sunday Coup ===
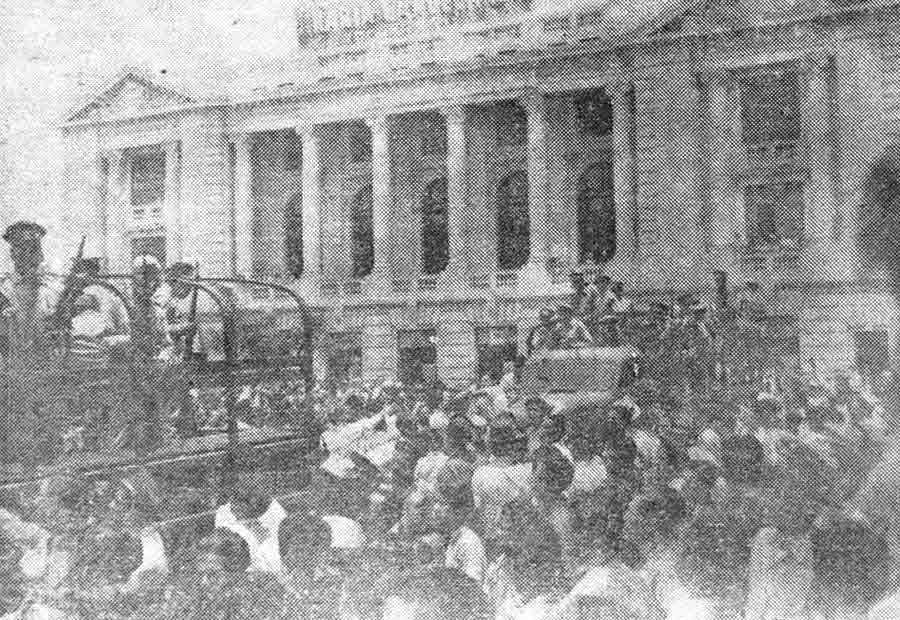
The Palm Sunday Coup attempt

On Palm Sunday, 2 April 1944, the 1st and 5th Infantry Divisions and the 2nd Artillery Regiment launched an attempted coup against Martínez's government. The coup was led by some military officers and politicians who had plotted the foiled 1943 coup attempt. The rebel military factions occupied strategic locations in San Salvador and in other major cities and took control of the air force and the YSP radio station. The National Police, the National Guard, and the remainder of the armed forces remained loyal to Martínez. The coup eventually failed due to a lack of leadership and the rebels' failure to capture Martínez. Throughout April 1944, many of the coup's leaders were given several criminal charges for their roles in the attempted coup. Twenty of the leadership were executed. Other leaders who evaded capture fled the country or took refuge in foreign embassies.

=== Strike of Fallen Arms ===
The various military officers and politicians executed following the attempted Palm Sunday Coup soon became seen as martyrs by students and other opponents of Martínez. On 28 April 1944, students at the University of El Salvador and doctors from hospitals in San Salvador declared they would go on strike to protest against the executions until Martínez's government resigned. They were later joined by postgraduate, high school, and primary school students. In the ensuing protests, soldiers killed over 100 students, leading to workers, bankers, business owners, and professors joining their protest and declaring a general strike to cripple the country's economy.

On 7 May 1944, the police killed José Wright, a United States citizen. After the United States ambassador to El Salvador demanded to know the circumstances surrounding Wright's death, Rodolfo Morales, the minister of governance, resigned. The ambassador later called for Martínez's resignation. On 8 May, Martínez announced his intention to resign as president, which he did on 9 May. Menéndez succeeded Martínez as provisional president, as he was the first presidential designate — the individual named as a presidential successor in the event the office became vacant.

== Death ==
On 11 May 1944, two days after issuing his resignation, Martínez and his family fled to Guatemala, with the assistance of Martínez's brother Guadeloupe. Afterwards, Martínez and his family moved to Honduras. He returned from exile on 9 July 1955, meeting President Óscar Osorio when his plane landed in San Salvador, but was greeted by protests. When the Legislative Assembly opened discussions on 23 July concerning whether to charge him with crimes committed during his time in office, he fled the country. On 15 May 1966, Martínez was stabbed seventeen times by his taxi driver, Cipriano Morales, at his kitchen in Hacienda Jamastrán, Honduras. Morales killed Martínez over a labor dispute, although police initially suspected robbery had been the primary motive.

== Personal life ==
=== Family ===
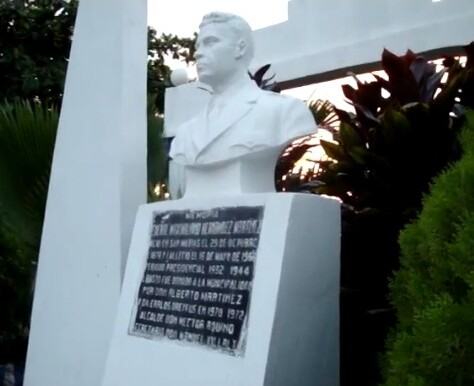
A bust of Martínez in San Matías, Martínez's hometown

Martínez married Araujo's former mistress, Concepción Monteagudo, as one of the conditions he had agreed to with Araujo to become his vice president. The couple had eight children: Alberto, Carmen, Esperanza, Marina, Eduardo, Rosa, Gloria, and Maximiliano. Martínez's uncle, Guadalupe Martínez, had helped him enroll in college.

=== Religious and personal beliefs ===
Martínez was a theosophist and a freemason. He believed in spiritualism and the occult, and he regularly performed séances at his home. In April 1944, when Luis Chávez y González, the archbishop of San Salvador, asked Martínez to stop the executions of revolutionaries "in the name of God", Martínez responded by telling Chávez, "I am God in El Salvador". Martínez converted to Catholicism later in life at the insistence of his wife.

Martínez became a vegetarian at the age of 40 and only drank water. He believed sunlight cast through colored bottles could cure illnesses. When a smallpox epidemic broke out in San Salvador, Martínez ordered the hanging of colored lights in the city in an effort to cure the epidemic. When his youngest son became ill with appendicitis, he refused to allow a surgeon to operate on him. Martínez believed water in blue bottles hit by sunlight would cure his son's condition, and his son died without receiving proper medical treatment. Martínez earned a reputation as a witch doctor for selling remedies that supposedly cured various conditions and circumstances. When a group of Americans offered to donate rubber sandals to barefoot Salvadoran schoolchildren, Martínez told them "It is good for children to go barefoot. That way they better receive the beneficial effluvia of the planet, the vibrations of the Earth. Plants and animals do not wear shoes." Martínez believed in reincarnation. During a publicly broadcast lecture at the University of El Salvador on his theosophist beliefs, he stated "It is a greater crime to kill an ant than a man because when the man dies he becomes reincarnated, while the ant dies definitively". He persisted with many of his beliefs and their associated practices for the rest of his life. Martínez's detractors nicknamed him "El Brujo" (Spanish for "The Witch" or "The Sorcerer") for his beliefs.

== Legacy ==
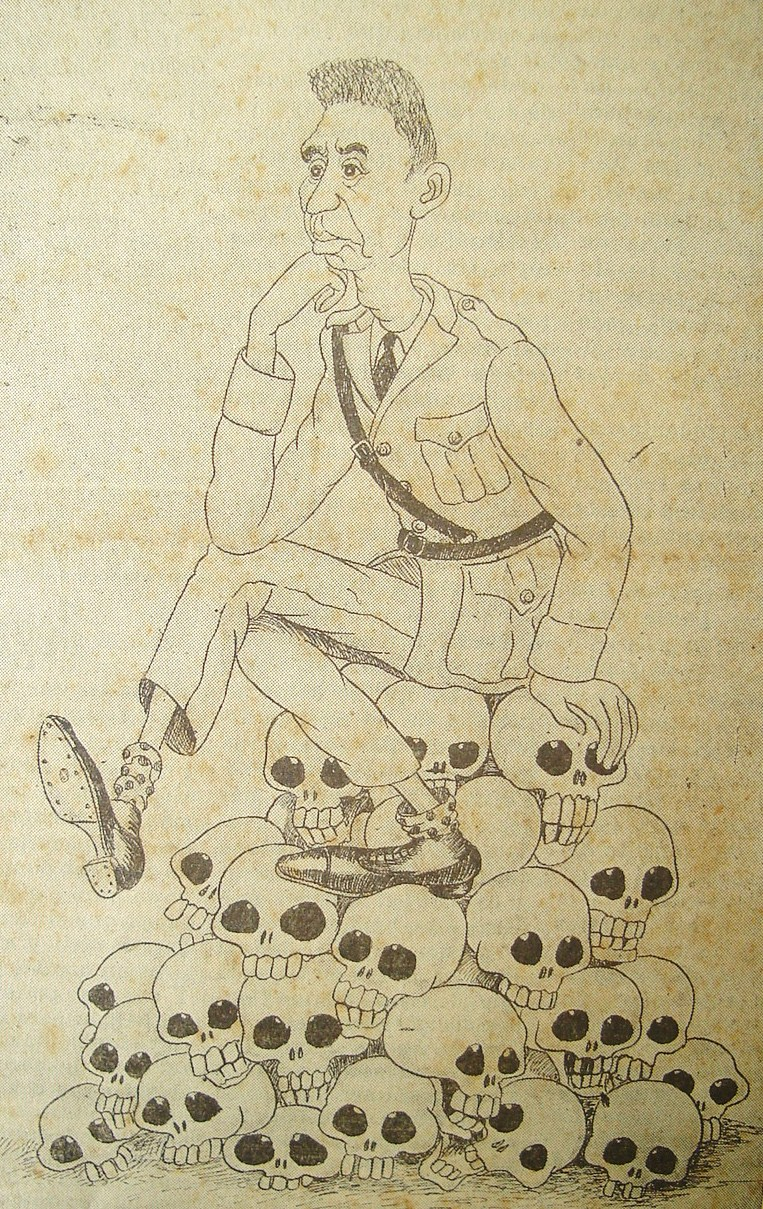
A 1940s caricature of Martínez sitting on a pile of skulls

Martínez was the longest-serving president in Salvadoran history, staying in office for over 12 years. His presidency is sometimes referred to as the Martinato. Martínez was the first in a series of military dictators who held power in El Salvador until the 1979 coup d'état.

Spanish:

Dicen que fue buen Presidente
porque repartió casas baratas
a los salvadoreños que quedaron...

English:

They say he was a good President
because he distributed cheap houses
to the Salvadorans who remained...

— The short poem: El general Martínez
by Roque Dalton

Martínez remains a controversial figure in El Salvador. Salvadoran poet Roque Dalton wrote a short poem attacking Martínez titled El general Martínez and named him again in a longer poem following his death titled La segura mano de Dios (The Sure Hand of God). As early as 1948, some history textbooks used in Salvadoran high schools described Martínez's government as a "Nazilike [sic] dictatorship". Jorge Lardé y Larín, a Salvadoran historian and professor at the Captain General Gerardo Barrios Military School, criticized Martínez and his government in his published works, emphasizing that he was not a hero. Many Salvadoran conservatives criticized Martínez's use of force against protestors in April and May 1944.

More recently, historians Héctor Lindo Fuentes, Erik Ching, and Rafael Lara Martínez wrote those same conservatives "might have cared little" about the mass killings during the anti-communist Matanza. During the 1950s, the Salvadoran military dictatorship that succeeded Martínez often ignored the events of La Matanza as a whole, up until the Cuban Revolution brought Fidel Castro to power in Cuba. Thereafter the government and pro-government newspapers began to promote La Matanza in anti-communist propaganda throughout the 1960s and 1970s. In 2004, the website for the Salvadoran military listed Martínez as one of El Salvador's most important military heroes.

During the Salvadoran Civil War of 1979 to 1992, a far-right death squad operating as the "Anti-Communist Alliance of El Salvador of the Glorious Maximiliano Hernández Martínez Brigade" took their name from Martínez. The group claimed responsibility for the assassinations of various Christian Democrat and Marxist politicians, the assassinations of six Revolutionary Democratic Front leaders in 1980, and other similar killings in 1983. Major Roberto D'Aubuisson, who founded and coordinated multiple death squads during the civil war, led the group at one point, and the Central Intelligence Agency alleged the death squad had connections to the Nationalist Republican Alliance political party D'Aubuisson had founded.

== Awards and decorations ==
During his presidency, Martínez was given the title "Benefactor of the Fatherland" ("Benefactor de la Patria"). Instead of styling himself as "Mr. President" ("señor Presidente"), he styled himself as "Master and Leader" ("Maestro y Líder"). Martínez was awarded the grand cordon of the Order of the Crown of Italy in 1934, followed by the cross of the Order of Boyacá from Colombia in 1936. He was also awarded the grand cross of the Order of the Quetzal by Guatemala in 1937, the Order of the Illustrious Dragon by the Japanese puppet state of Manchukuo in China in September 1938, the grand cross of the Imperial Order from Japan in October 1938, and the Pan-American Order of Pétion and Bolivar from Haiti in 1940. He was awarded the grand cross and collar of the Order of Isabella the Catholic by Spain in 1940 and 1941, respectively.

== Dates of ranks ==
The following is a list of Martínez's Salvadoran Army ranks during his career.

Insignia	Rank	Date of promotion
Sub-lieutenant	Sub-lieutenant	?
Lieutenant	Lieutenant	17 November 1903
Captain	Captain	23 August 1906
Major captain	Major captain	1906
Lieutenant colonel	Lieutenant colonel	6 May 1909
Colonel	Colonel	15 June 1914
General	General	14 July 1919

== See also ==
- List of heads of state and government with a military background
- List of heads of state and government who have been in exile

== Notes ==
Political offices
Preceded by Pío Romero Bosque	Minister of War, the Navy, and Aviation of El Salvador; 1931	Succeeded by Salvador López Rochac
Preceded by Gustavo Vides	Vice President of El Salvador; 1931–1934	Succeeded by Manuel Adriano Vilanova
Preceded by Arturo Araujo	President of El Salvador; 1931–1934 (provisional)	Succeeded by Andrés Ignacio Menéndez (provisional)
Preceded by Andrés Ignacio Menéndez (acting)	Minister of War, the Navy, and Aviation of El Salvador (acting); 1934–1935	Succeeded by Andrés Ignacio Menéndez
Preceded by Andrés Ignacio Menéndez (provisional)	President of El Salvador; 1935–1944	Succeeded by Andrés Ignacio Menéndez (provisional)
