= Culture of El Salvador =

The culture of El Salvador is a Central American culture nation influenced by the clash of ancient Mesoamerica and medieval Iberian Peninsula. Salvadoran culture is influenced by Native American culture (Lenca people, Cacaopera people, Maya peoples, Pipil people) as well as Latin American culture (Latin America, Hispanic America, Ibero-America). Mestizo culture, Afro-Latin culture and the Catholic Church dominates the country. Although the Romance language, Castilian Spanish, is the official and dominant language spoken in El Salvador, Salvadoran Spanish which is part of Central American Spanish has influences of Native American in the languages of El Salvador such as Lencan languages, Cacaopera language, Mayan languages and Pipil language, which are still spoken in some regions of El Salvador.

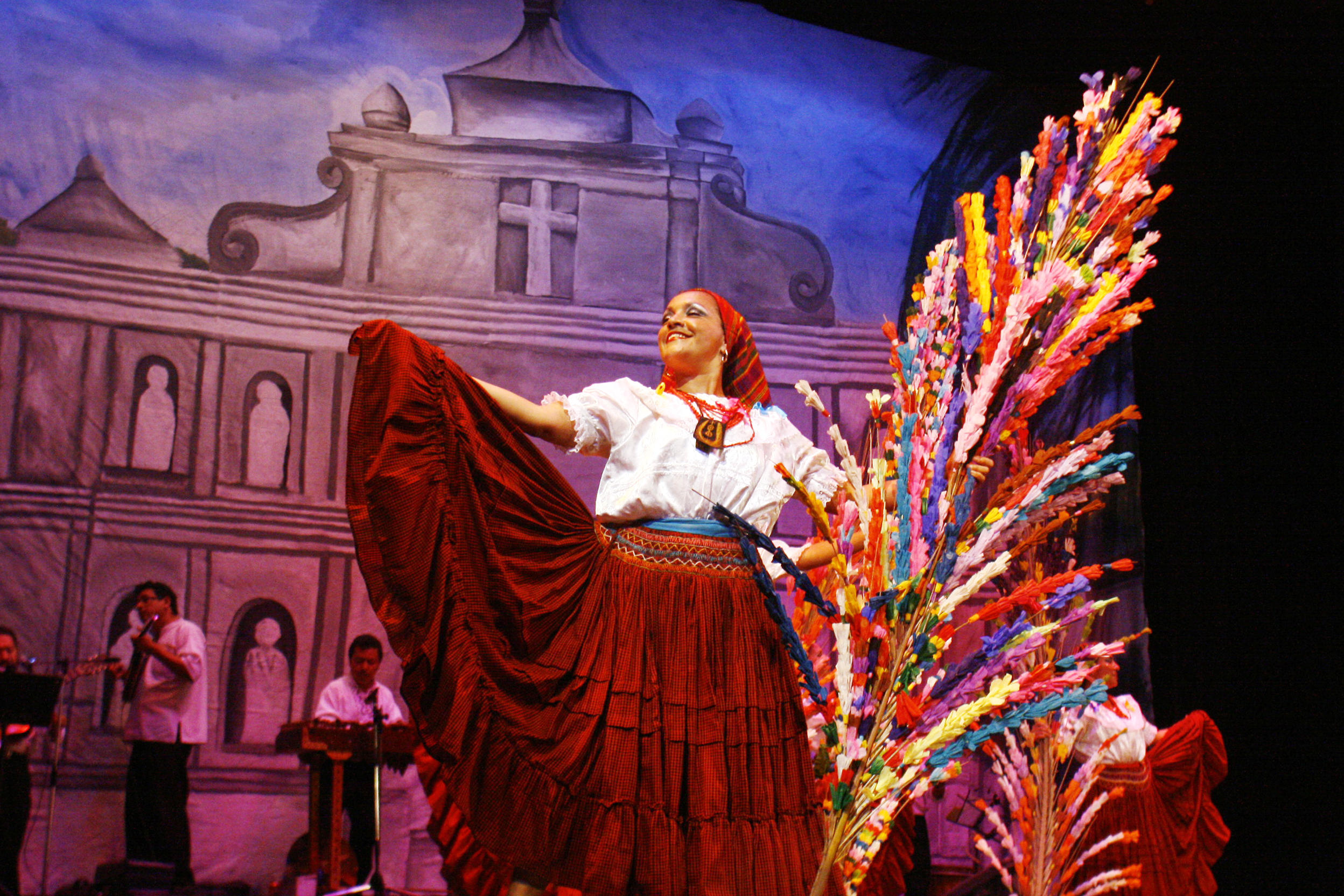
Traditional Salvadoran dress.

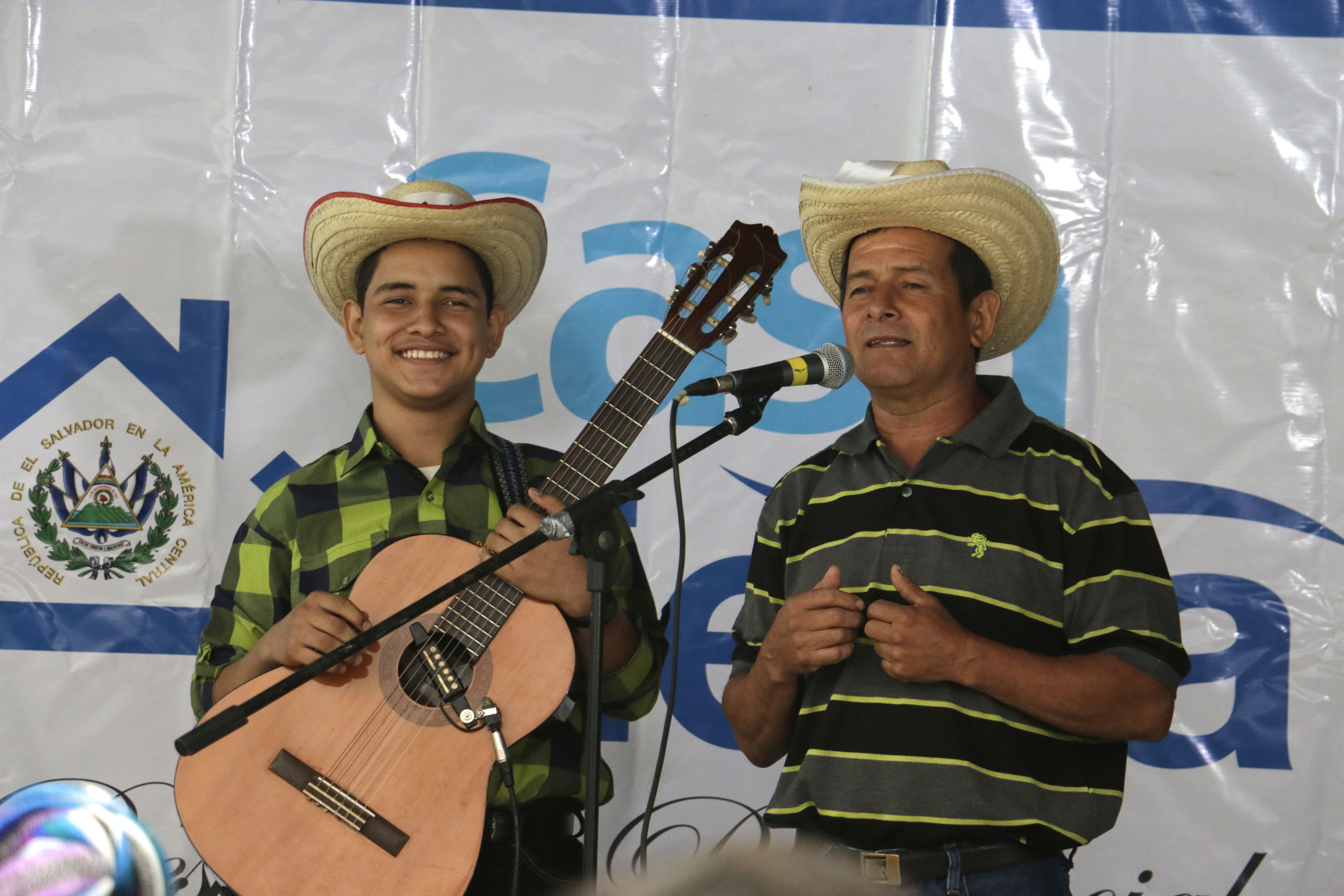
Salvadorans musicians.

Type	Symbol	Year	Image
Anthem	National Anthem of El Salvador	1879	
Motto	DIOS UNIÓN LIBERTAD	1821	
Flag and Coat of arms	Coat of arms of El Salvador and Flag of El Salvador	1912	
Color	Cobalt blue and white Additional appendages are in golden Amber (color)	1912	
Bird	Turquoise-browed motmot	1999	
Reptile	Green iguana		
Fish	Amatitlania Coatepeque, Endemic Species		
Art	Fernando Llort style Art		
Music	Xuc		
Instrument	Xylophone		
Dish	Pupusa		
Flower	Yucca gigantea	2003	
Tree	Tabebuia rosea	1939	
UNESCO World Heritage Site	Joya de Cerén	1993	
Patron and National Personification	Monumento al Divino Salvador del Mundo		

== Native Homeland ==
Modern El Salvador map

Salvadorans inhabit the lush Central American nation of El Salvador. El Salvador is one of seven countries in the giant isthmus of Central America. The surface of El Salvador features tropical forest, jungles, mountains, volcanoes, plains (savanna), rivers, lagoons, lakes, calderas and the Pacific Ocean. The forests of El Salvador contain a wide diversity of flora and fauna. El Salvador is a home to ecosystems, biomes, living, nonliving natural resources and also home to a plethora of diverse species. In terms of nonliving resources, El Salvador contains rich volcanic soil, fertile earth that gives life to lush vegetation. Native vegetation such as Yucca gigantea, Cassava, Echites panduratus, and Crotalaria longirostrata which are used in Salvadoran food. El Salvador also contains gold under its surface, however all type of mining has been abolished in El Salvador. The Native American indigenous ancestors of Salvadorans, have been living in the region for thousands of years. El Salvador is periodically hit with earthquakes and tropical storms, occasionally but rarely by cyclones.

== Demonym ==
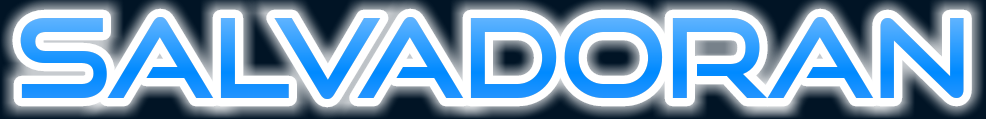
Salvadoran is the demonym for someone who is from El Salvador

Salvadoreño/a in Spanish and in English Salvadoran is the accepted and most commonly used term for referring people of Salvadoran ancestry. However, both Salvadorian and Salvadorean are widely used terms in daily life by English-speaking Salvadoran citizens living in the United States and other English-speaking countries. Both words can be seen in most Salvadoran business signs in the United States and elsewhere in the world. This is because the sounds "ia" and "ea" in Salvadorian and Salvadorean sound more closely to the "ñ" sound in the Spanish term Salvadoreño.

Centroamericano/a in Spanish and in English Central American is an alternative standard and widespread cultural identity term that Salvadorans use to identify themselves, along with their regional isthmian neighbours. It is a secondary demonym and it is widely used as an interchangeable term for El Salvador and Salvadorans. The demonym Central American is an allusion to the strong union that the Central America region has had since its independence. The term Central America is not only a regional cultural identity, but also a political identity, since the region has been united on various occasions as a single country such as the United Provinces of Central America, Federal Republic of Central America, National Representation of Central America, and Greater Republic of Central America. The same can be said for El Salvador's neighbors, specifically the original five states of Central America.

=== Nicknames ===
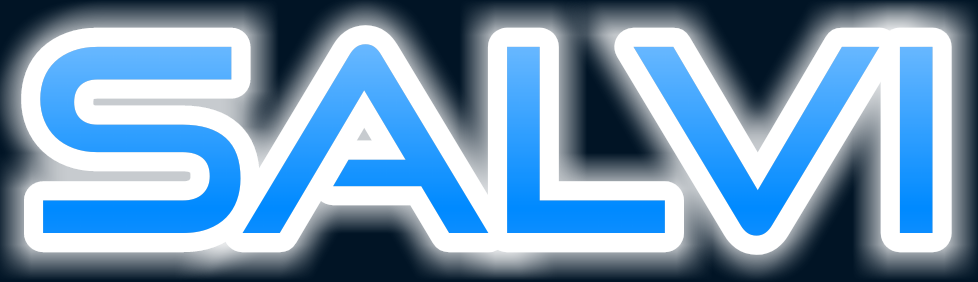
Salvi is the endearing nickname for someone from El Salvador in English speaking countries

Salvi is an informal demonym referring to the Salvadoran people and their culture, specifically to overseas born Salvadorans in the diaspora located in the United States. The word is formed by Anglonization and taking the first five letters of the affectionate diminutive hypocorism form of Salvador (Salvita) to a shorten form "Salvi", with plural being Salvis. The slang term Salvi was coined and used for self-identification by the first generation wave of Salvadoran Americans born in the United States from parents who had escaped the civil war in the 1980s, and has been used as a term of endearment. The term has been widely used and is in mainstream usage particularly among younger members and masses of the Salvadoran American sector. The term Salvi is preserved in a very positive light when compared to its other older counterparts and predecessors such as Guanaco and Salvatrucha which have fallen into disuse among Salvadoran Americans, regarded as derogatory and negative. The term Cuscatleco is reserved for older generations of Salvadorans, specifically those born in El Salvador.

Outside the United States and especially within El Salvador itself the term Guanaco/Guanaca is still commonly used and is not considered offensive. It is used much in the same way Salvi is used among Salvadoran Americans, it is regarded as a term of endearment among Salvadorans especially those within El Salvador itself.

== Languages ==
In El Salvador, the official language is Central American Spanish. Less than one percent of the population speaks the Pipil language, in places such as Izalco and several other towns. However, there is no obligation academically or socially today to learn it, and the language is more commonly spoken by the elderly. Amongst the pre-Columbia languages that still exist common to places such as Izalco and Cacaopera is Nawat Pipil. English is taught as a second language and is commonly spoken by business people, as the country is developing through globalization.

=== Salvadoran Spanish ===
Central American Spanish is spoken by the majority of the country's population. The language and pronunciation vary depending on the region.

== Sports ==
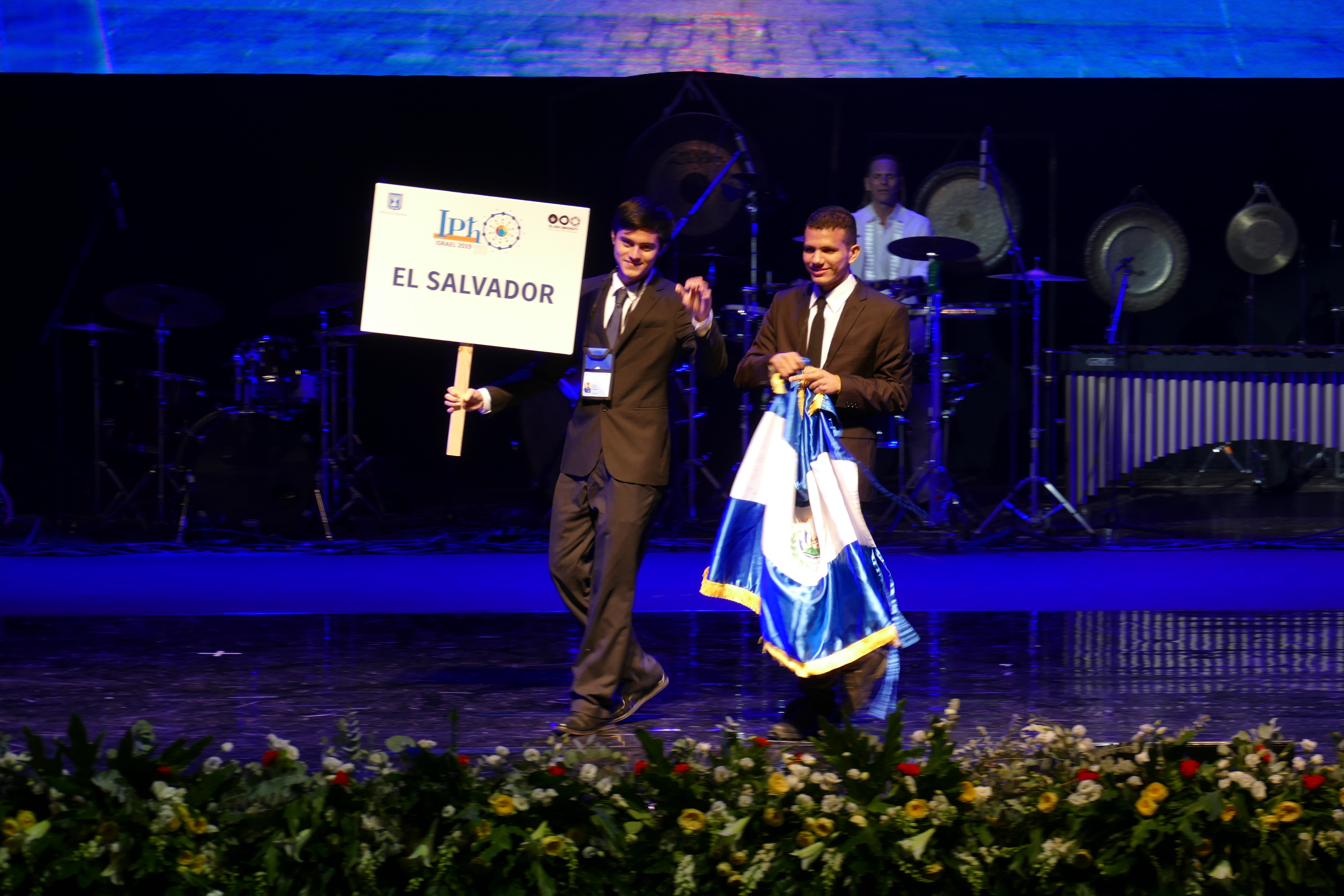
Team El Salvador at the opening ceremony of the 2019 International Physics Olympiad

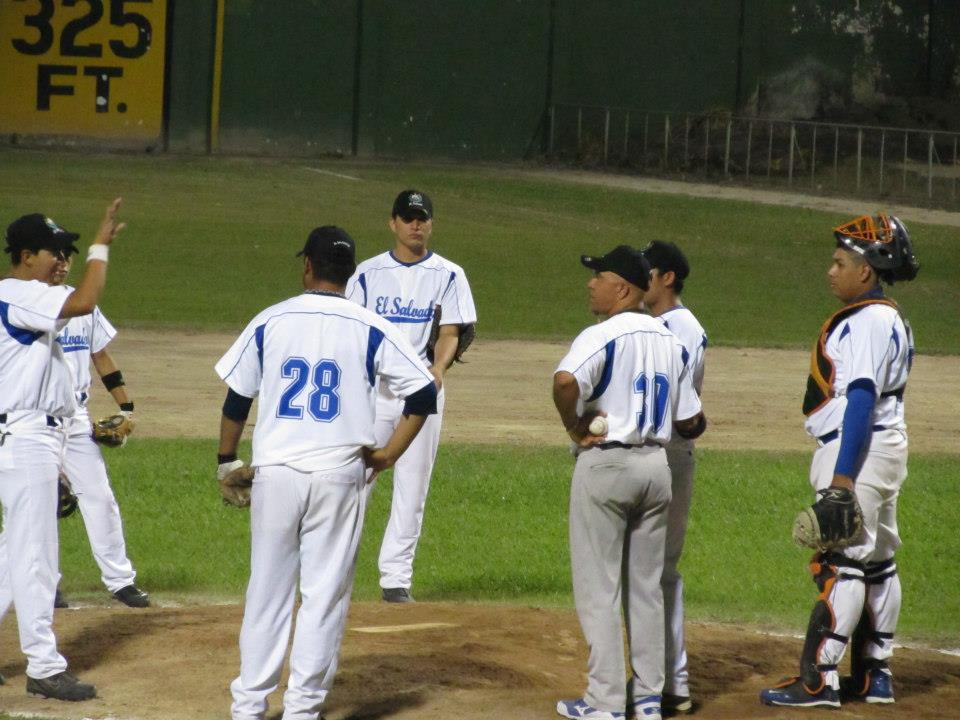
Salvadoran baseball players El Salvador national baseball team

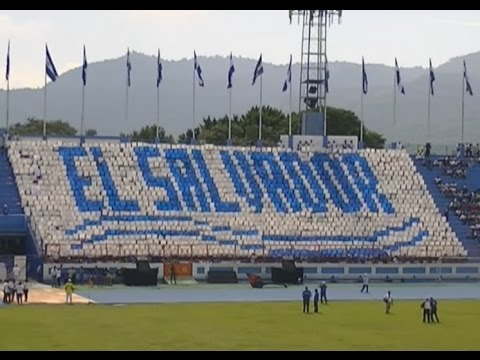
Estadio Jorge "Mágico" González

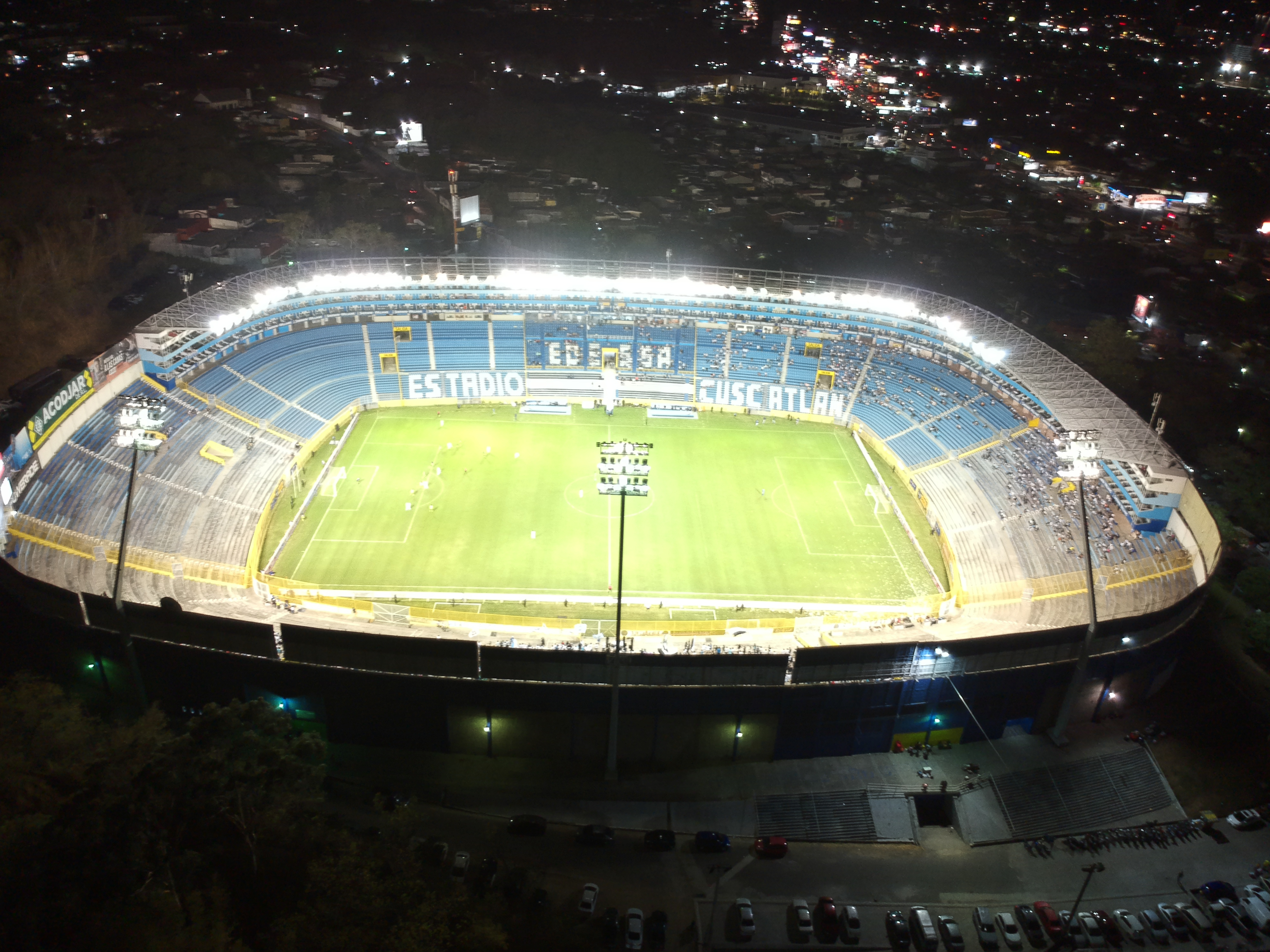
Estadio Cuscatlán

The main sport played by Salvadorans is association football. The Estadio Cuscatlán in the capital San Salvador is the largest stadium in Central America, with a capacity of just over 45,000. The stadium is the home ground of the El Salvador national football team, as well as club teams Alianza FC and Atletico Marte

The main football clubs in El Salvador play in the Primera División de Fútbol de El Salvador, which is made up of the top ten clubs. Below the Primera División exists a second level or Segunda División, made up of 24 teams split into two groups of twelve. There is promotion and relegation between the two divisions at the end of each season.

As of late 2021, El Salvador's women's national volleyball team has been among the top contenders in Central America's AFECAVOL (Asociación de Federaciones CentroAmericanas de Voleibol) zone.

=== Events hosted by El Salvador ===
The nation will host surfing competitions for the 2031 Pan American Games with the rest of the sports taking place in Asunción, Paraguay. El Salvador will also host the 2027 FIBA Women's AmeriCup.

== Traditions and Events ==
El Salvador celebrates many holidays and traditions, including International Women's Day.

Another big tradition that El salvador celebrates is “Las Bolas De Fuego” translated to “The Balls of Fire”. This festival includes 2 teams that light up a ball of cloth on fire and start throwing it towards each other like it is a game of dodgeball. For outsiders, this tradition may seem strange but it is something that brings thousands of Salvadorans together and unites the country for a day. There are many reasons as to why this event is celebrated the way it is but the most well-known reason is because of the Volcanic eruption that occurred in 1658. Balls of fire from the eruption destroyed the town of Nejapa, resulting in everyone fleeing the town. This tragic chain of events is what made the annual event popular. They also celebrate San Miguel. San Miguel takes place every November during the festivities in honor of their patron, Our Lady of Peace. Another holiday they support is Fiesta de San Salvador. Fiesta de San Salvador is celebrated annually on August 6. Founded in the 16th century, the national holiday celebrates Salvadoran identity and marks the Transfiguration of Jesus Christ.

== Architecture ==
El Salvador's colonial structures, especially its colonial cathedrals, have been destroyed over time by historic earthquakes, consequently Modernist and Gothic style cathedrals have taken their place. During the Salvadoran civil war, large building construction projects were halted and eventually cancelled due to the collapse of the economy; the remainder of Streamline Moderne, early Modernist office and hotel buildings collapsed during the 1986 San Salvador earthquake and the January 2001 and February 2001 El Salvador earthquakes, while the few remaining old buildings were left uninhabitable. The seismic nature of El Salvador has until recently hindered the construction of high rise buildings and skyscrapers in the country; however, with new technological advances and the advent of earthquake-resistant structures, high rise buildings have begun blooming. Today the country has monuments, plazas, stadiums, high rise buildings, large malls and cathedrals built in Neo-Gothic, Modernist, Populuxe, Googie, Art Deco and Futurist style architecture.

== Religion ==
Religious background in El Salvador
Religion	Percent
Roman Catholic	47%
Protestant–Evangelical	33%
None	17%
Other	3%

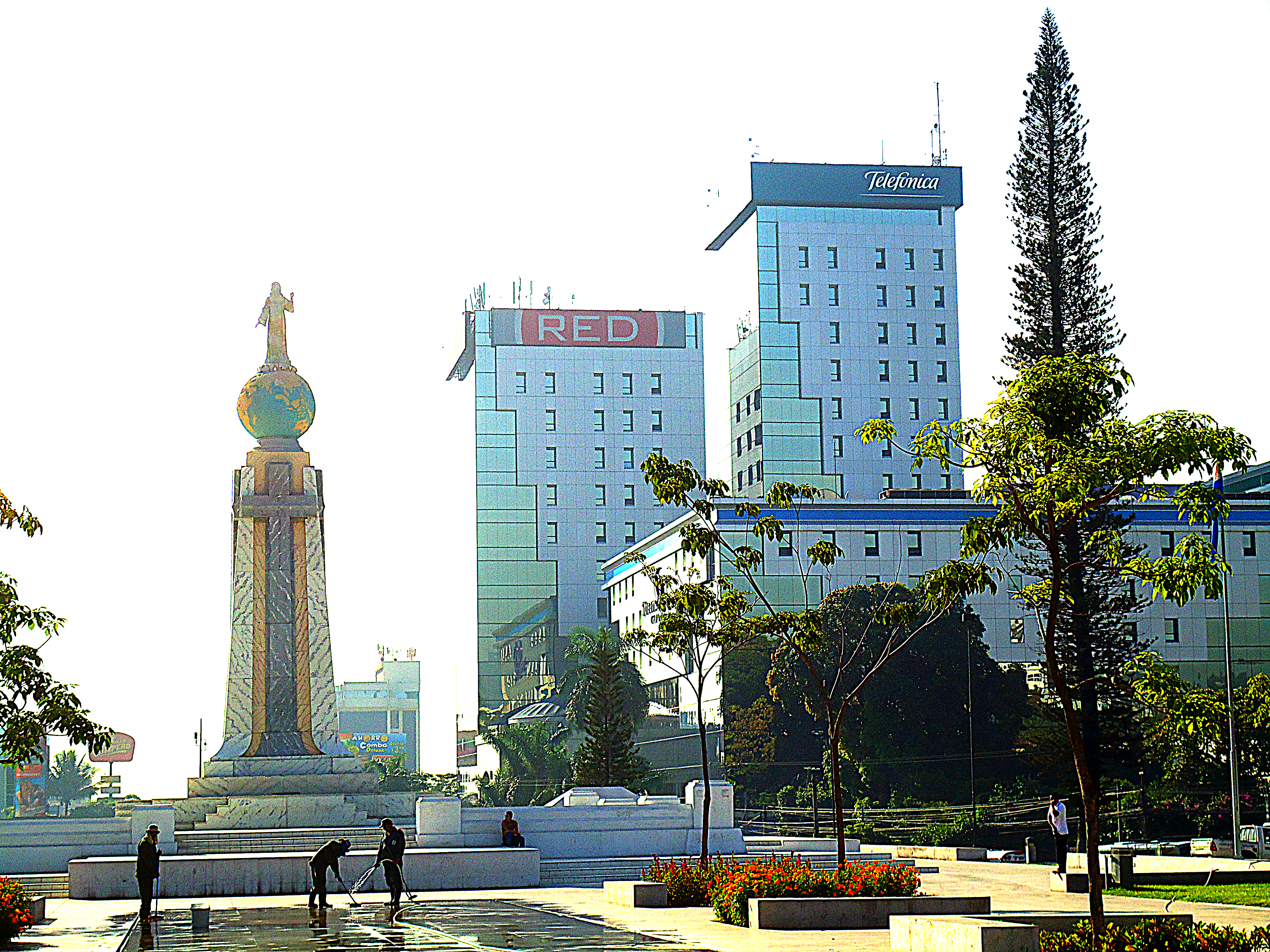
The iconic Jesus statue Monumento al Divino Salvador del Mundo, a landmark located in the country's capital, San Salvador.

The Catholic Church has been the most prominent religious institution in El Salvador since colonial times, with nearly 75% of the population identifying as Roman Catholic. Reformed churches like Anglican, Lutheran, Pentecostal, and Baptists have experienced significant growth since the 1970s. Seventh Day Adventists, Mormons and Jehovah's Witnesses are also experiencing growth in the nation. Today, nearly 20% of the population belongs to one of these churches. Today, over 40% of El Salvador is Evangelical Christian. Small communities of Muslims, Jews, and Buddhists also exist in some parts of the country.

=== Costumes relating to religion ===
In El Salvador, there are different costumes used mostly in religious or other festivals, although in some of the older towns, they are still worn regularly. In female clothing, it is common to see elements like a scapular, a shawl, and a cotton headscarf with different coloured adornments. These can be worn with a skirt and a blouse, or with a dress. The normal footwear is sandals. With male clothing, it is common to see a cotton suit or a cotton shirt, worn with modern jeans, sandals or boots, and a cowboy hat. However, these are rural fashions, and there can be many variations depending on the area. Also, 100% cotton shirts are commonly used (also known as guayaberas).

== Music ==
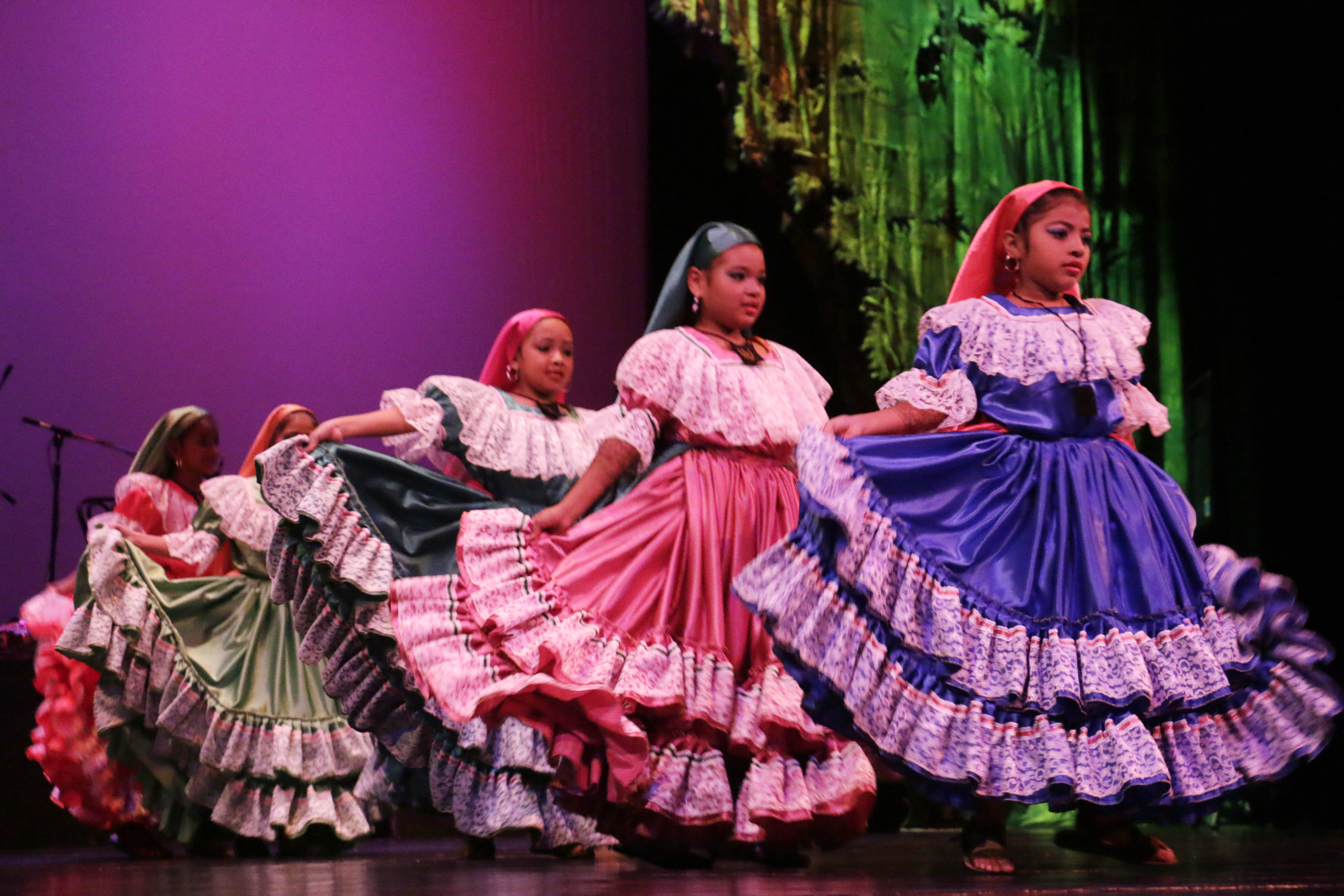
Salvadoran girls in folkloric garb

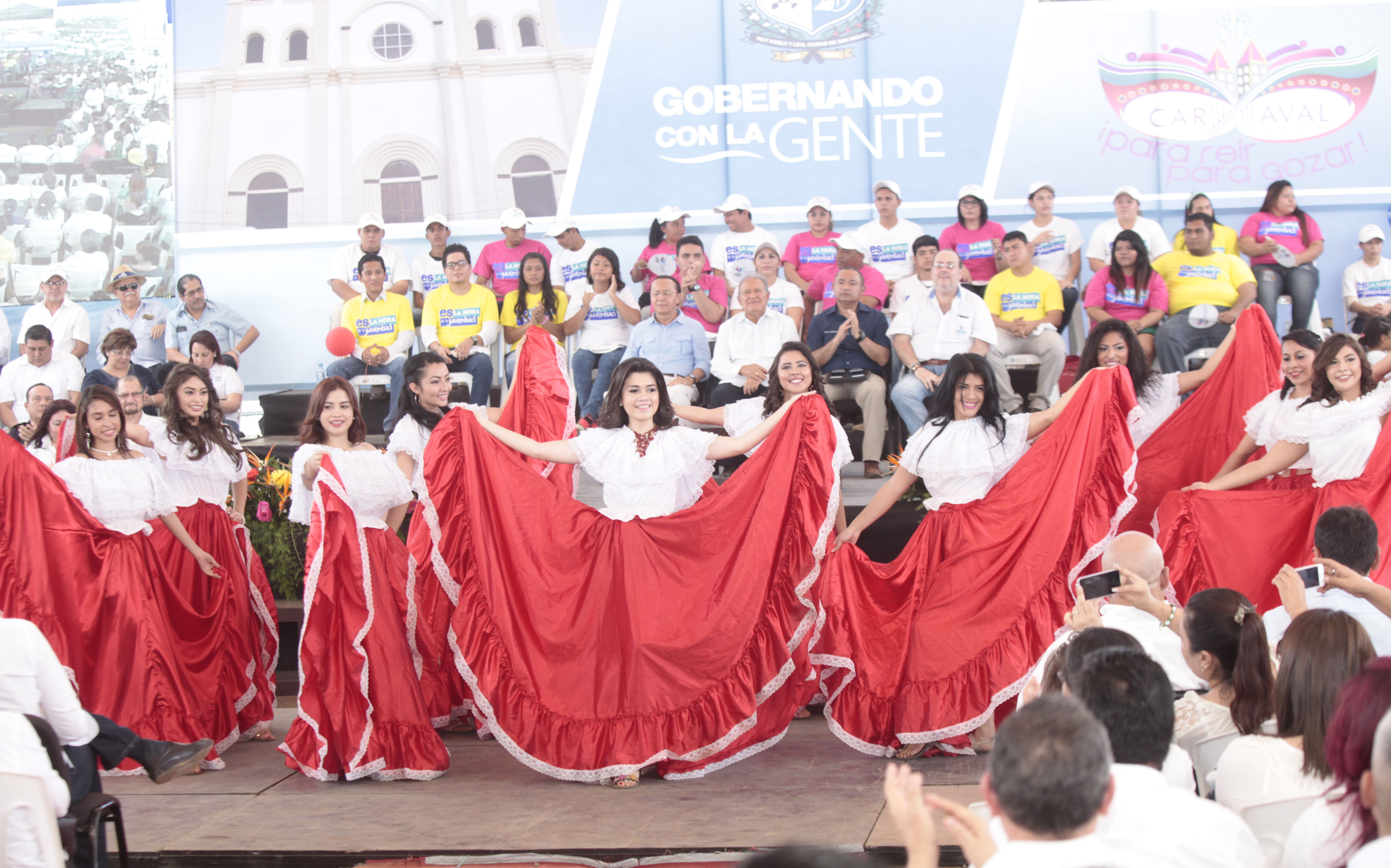
Young Salvadoran girls dancing traditional colonial music San Miguel, El Salvador

The music of El Salvador has a mixture of Lenca, Maya, Cacaopera, Pipil and Spanish influences, as well as Palestinian Salvadoran Arabic music and also African.

Music instruments that are present in El Salvador are Native American Pan-Indianism instruments such as Native American flute and drums, African instruments like xylophone, Güira and Mbira, European instruments like Guitar, pedal steel guitar, Fanfare trumpet and piano, Arab instruments like Oud, Ney, Goblet drum and Qanun (instrument). Religious Contemporary Catholic liturgical music instrument such as Tubular bells, Pipe organ, and Glass harmonica are also present.

This music includes religious songs (mostly used to celebrate Christmas and other holidays, especially feast days of the saints). Satirical and rural lyrical themes are common. Cuban, Colombian, and Mexican music has infiltrated the country, especially salsa and cumbia. Popular music in El Salvador uses Xylophone, tehpe'ch, flutes, drums, scrapers and gourds, as well as more recently imported guitars and other instruments. El Salvador's well known folk dance is known as Xuc which originated in Cojutepeque, Cuscatlan. Other musical repertoire consists of danza, pasillo, marcha and canciones.

== Arts and Crafts ==
=== La Palma-Style Art ===
The traditional style of art in El Salvador comes from the northern town of La Palma, and that is where artists are trained and live today. Originating from an artist named Fernando Llort, the art is simple and colorful, typically making use of animals such as birds, rabbits, and turtles, as well as common objects such as flowers, trees, and houses. Each piece reflects the images of the every-day life of the region: birds, flowers, animals, villagers and adobe houses

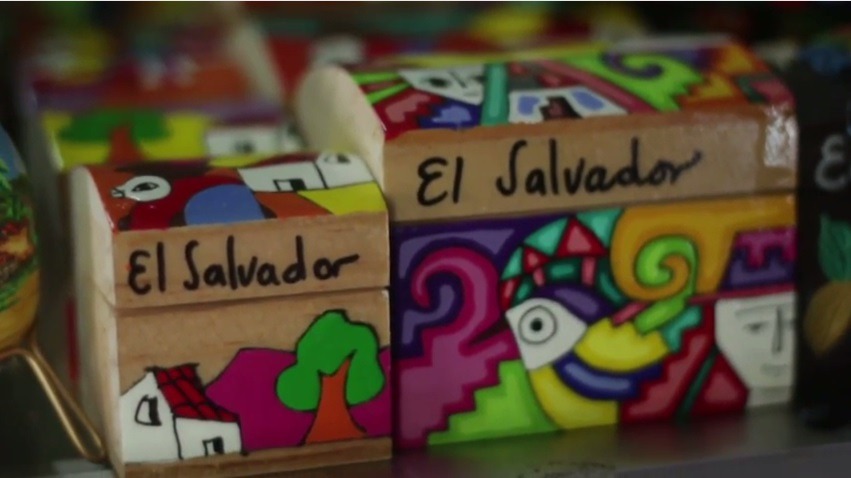
La Palma-type art, from La Palma, Chalatenango

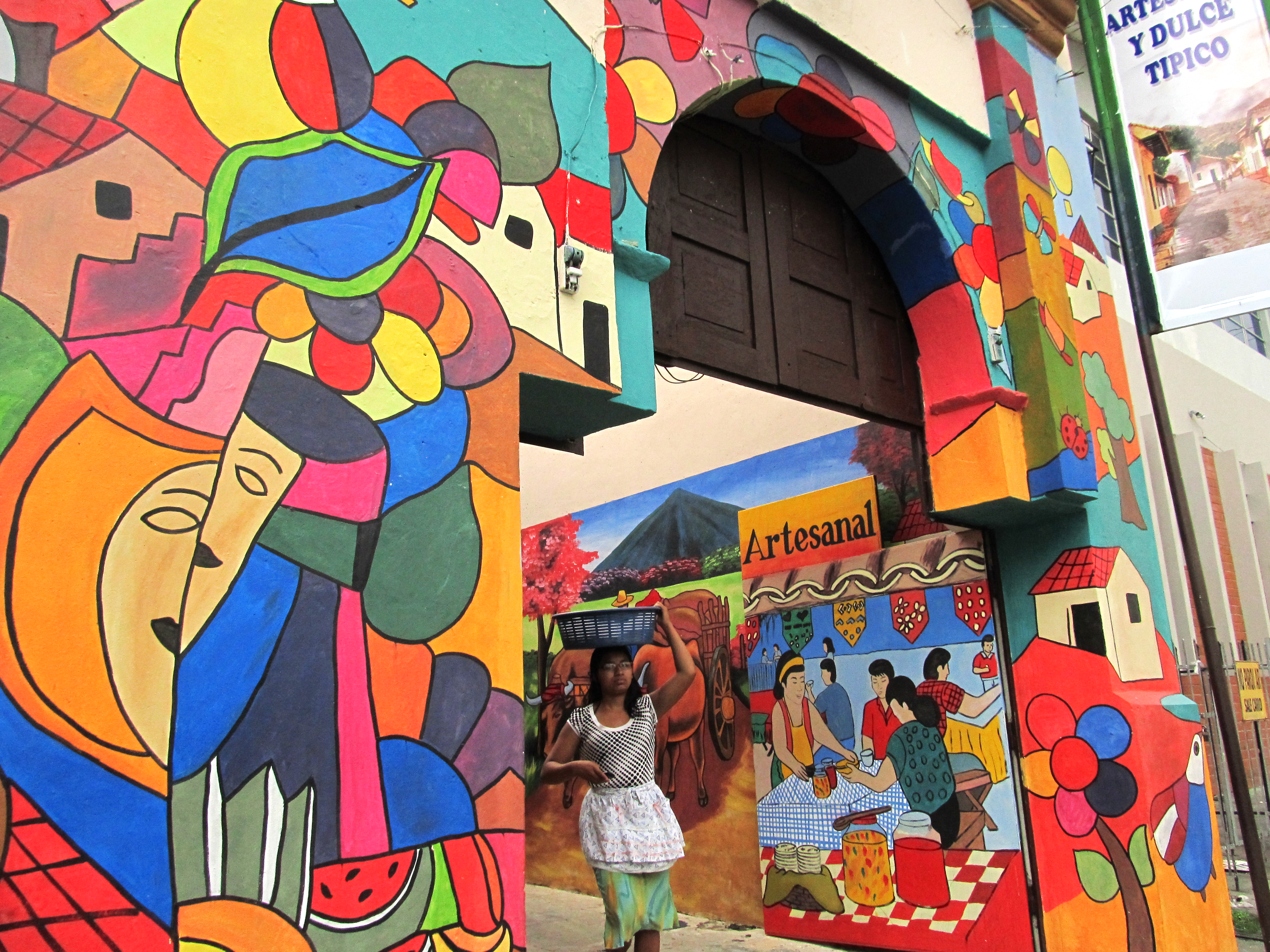
La Palma-type art form from Santa Ana, El Salvador

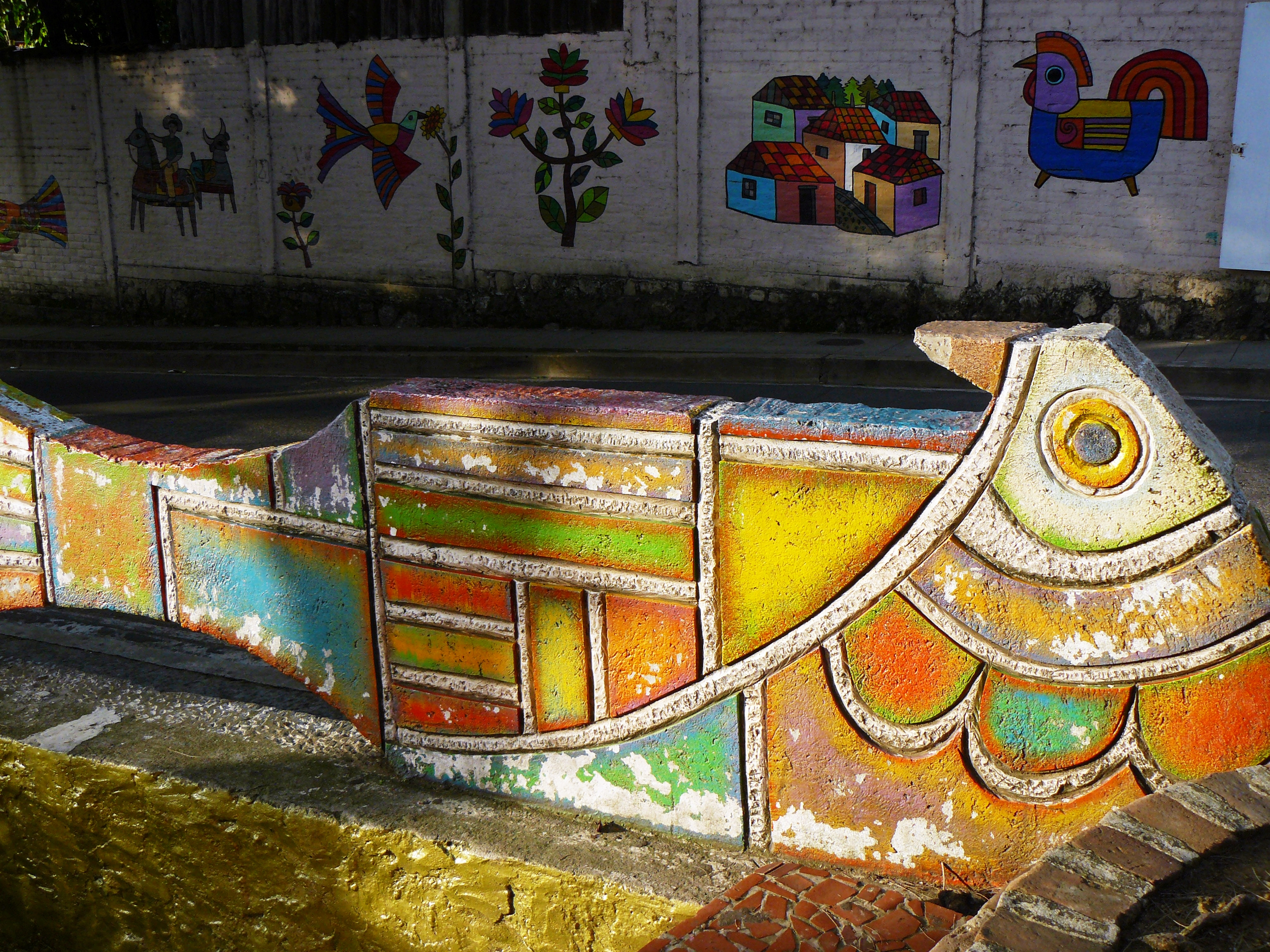
Salvadoran staple art in La Palma, Chalatenango

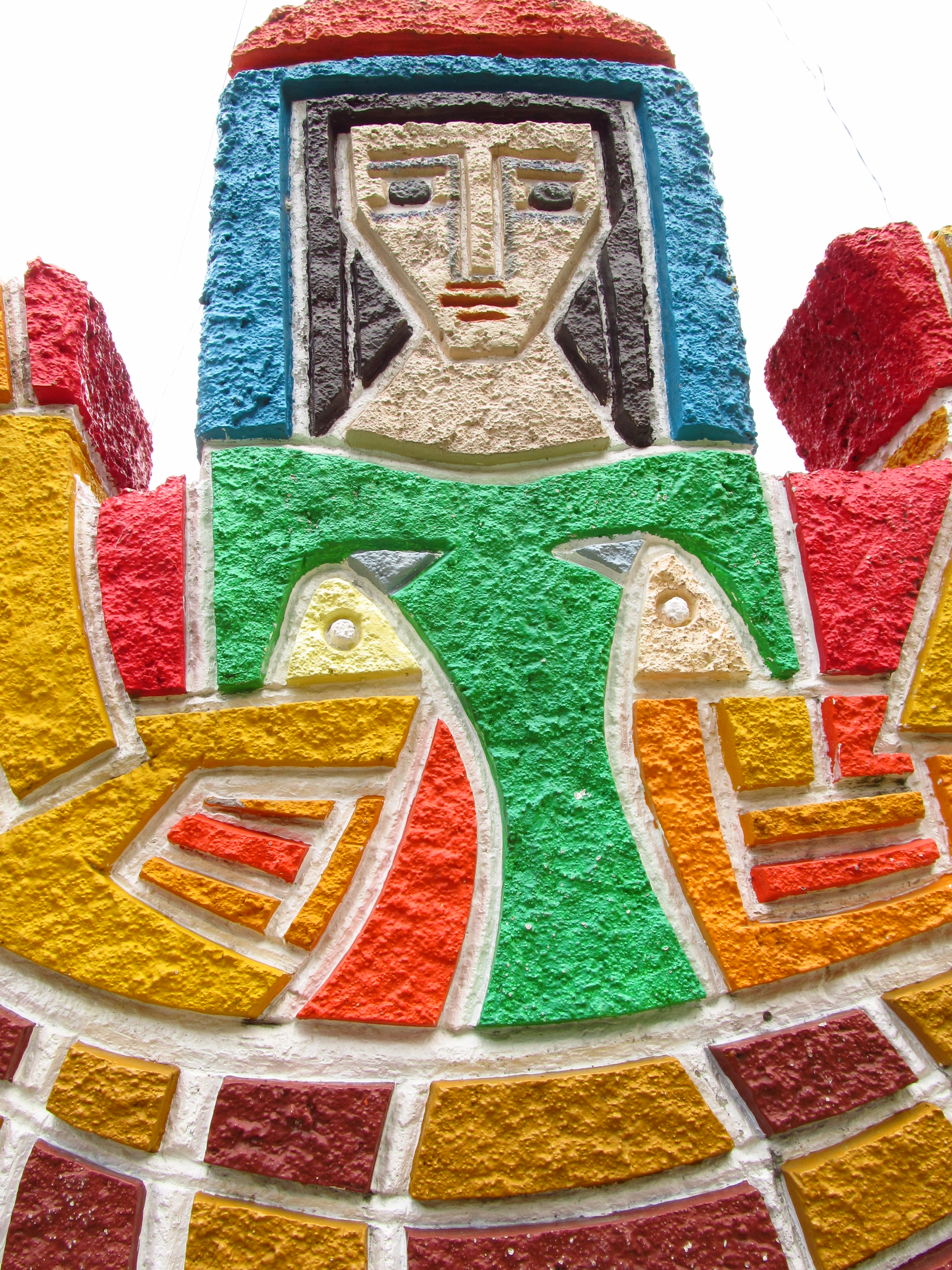
Artistic figure in La Palma park

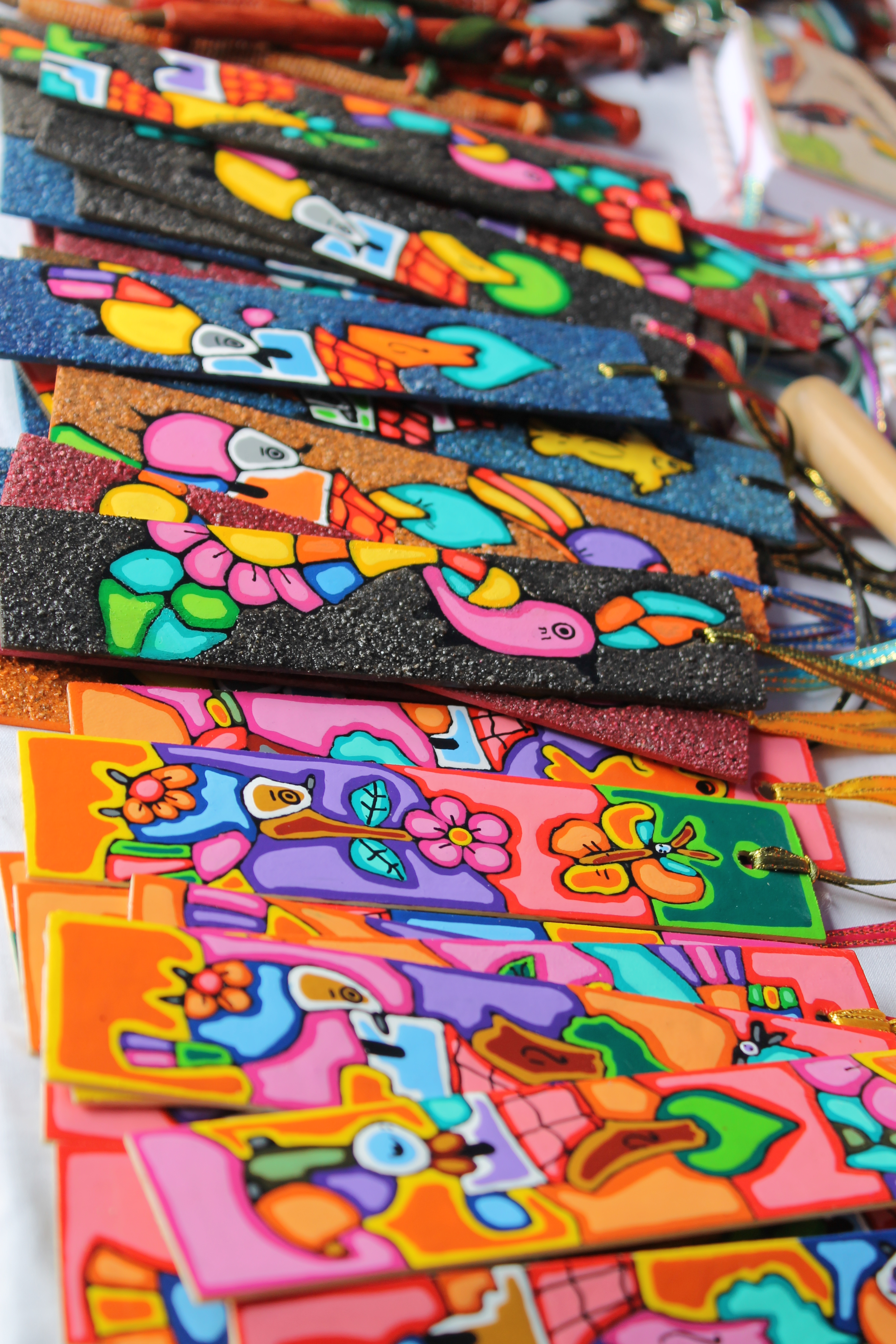
Hand crafted bookmarks from La Palma.

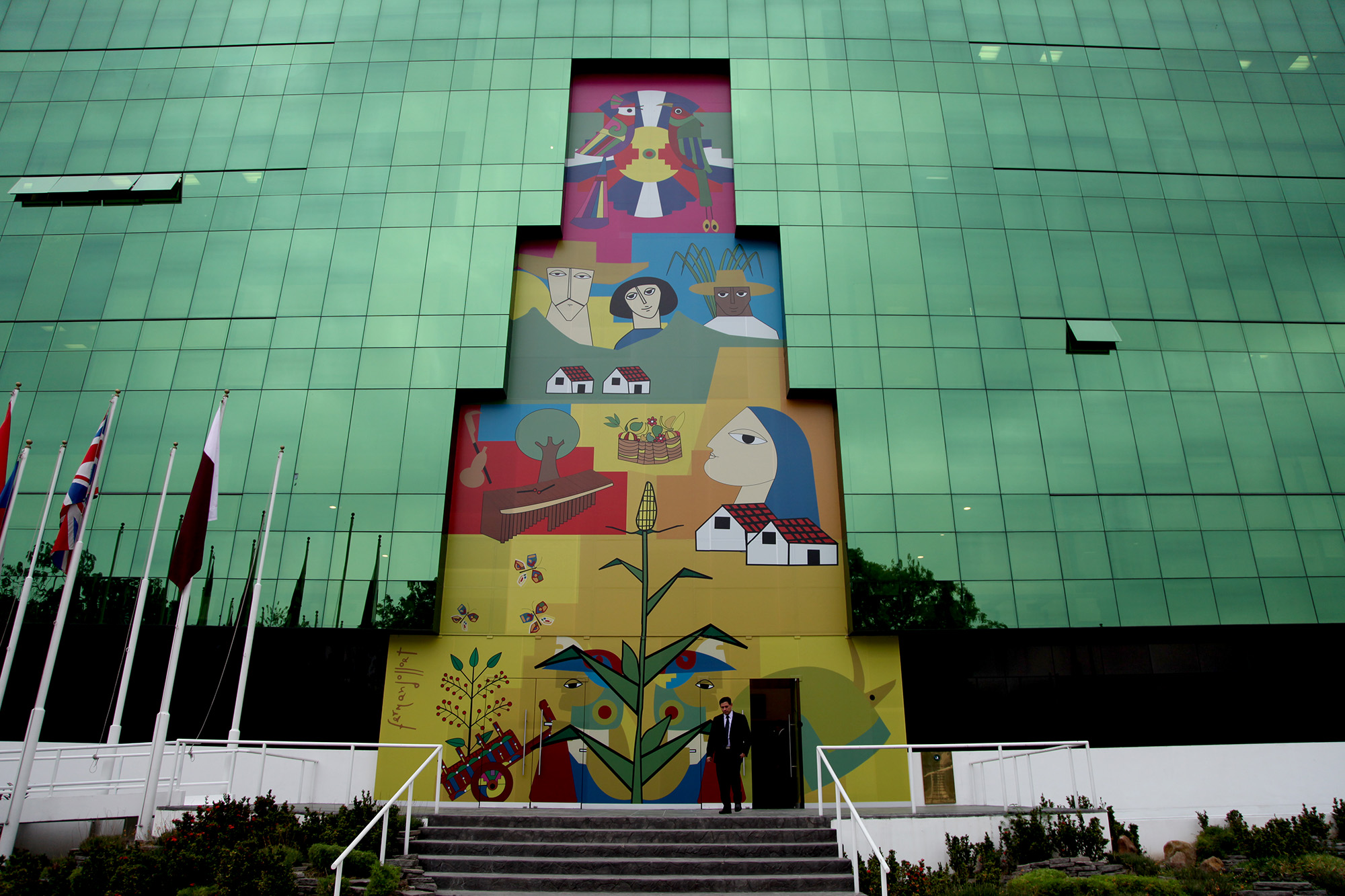
La Palma-Style art on modern building in San Salvador

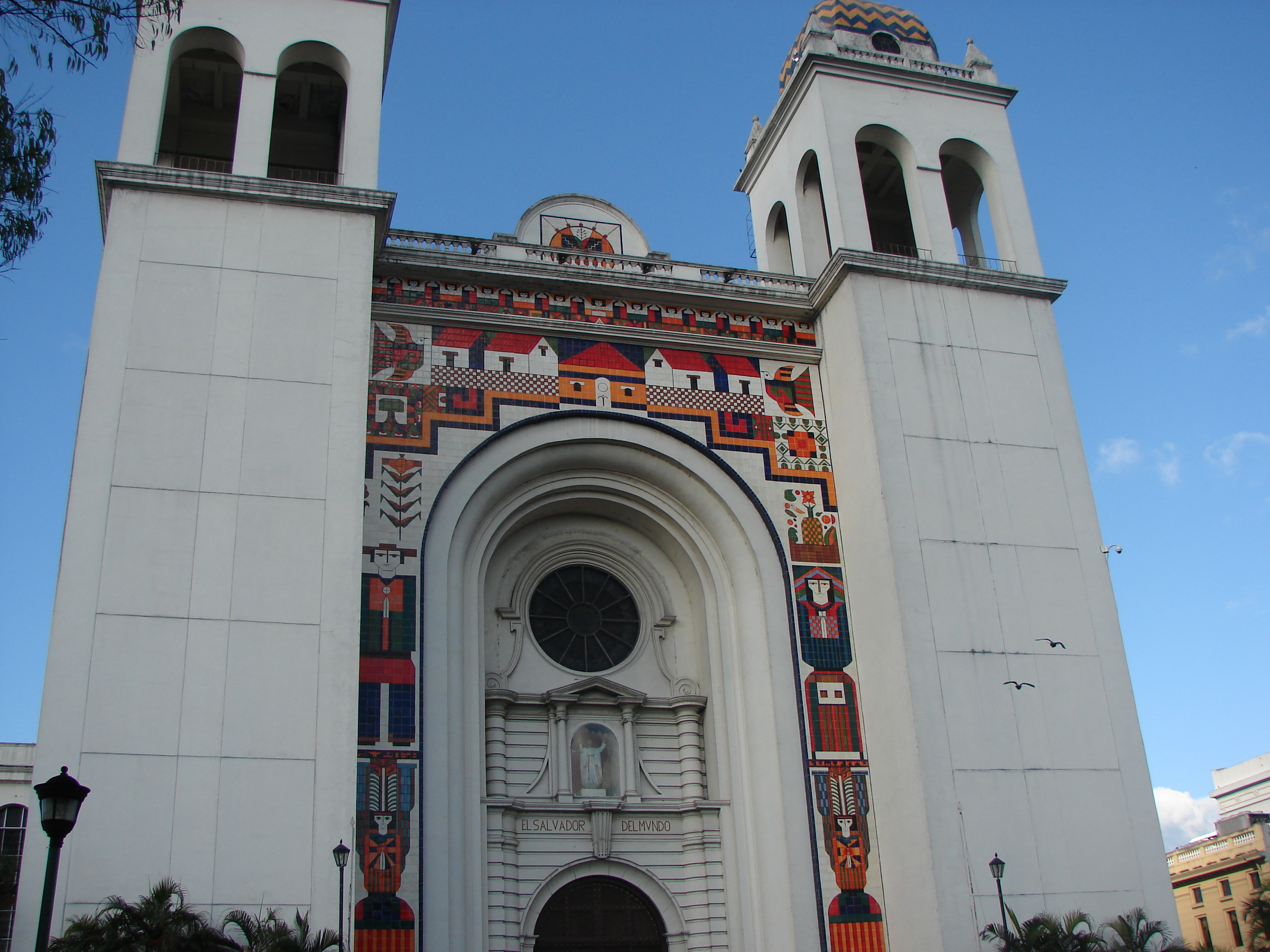
Destroyed mural of San Salvador Cathedral

=== Ataco Murals ===
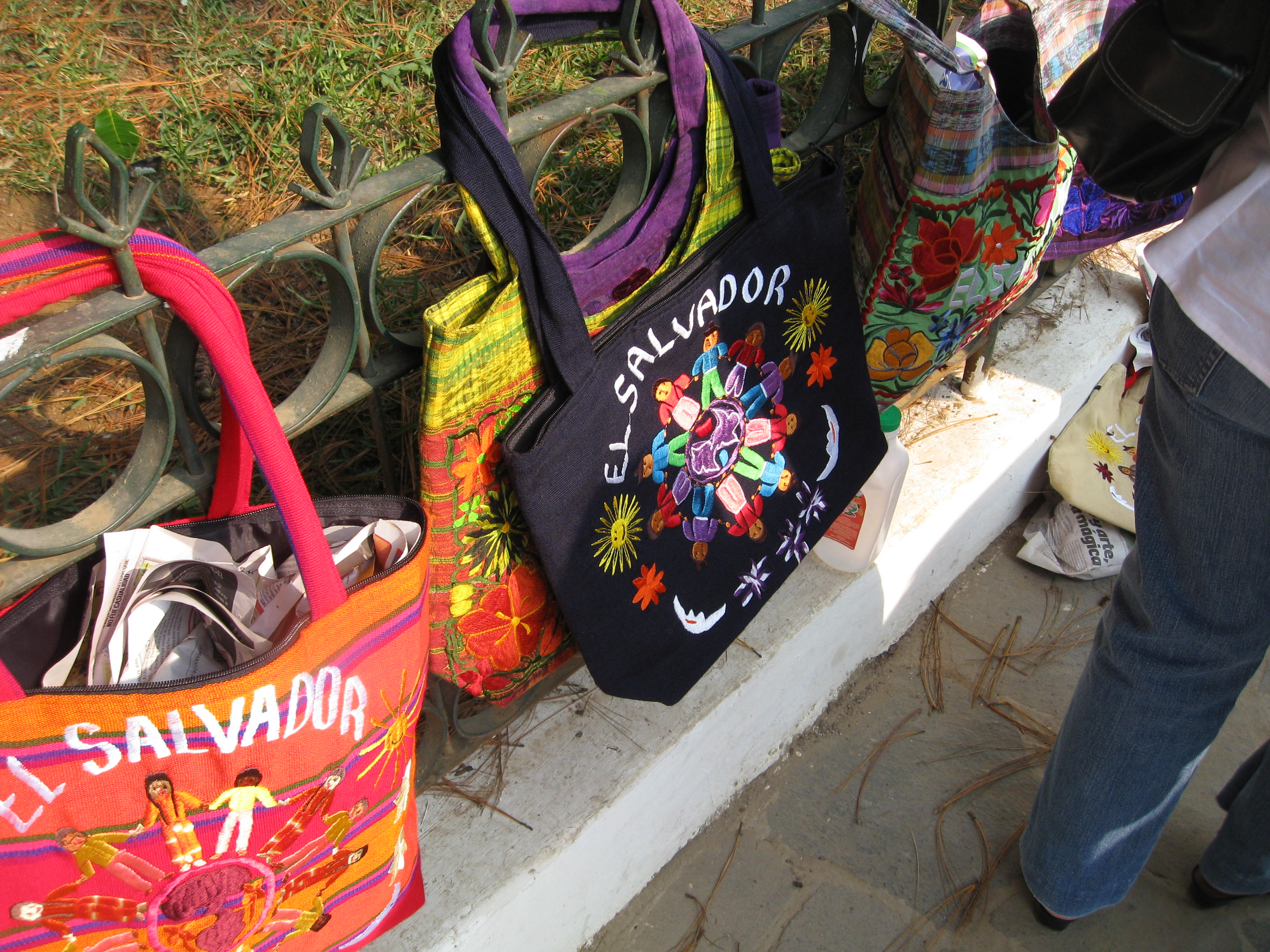
Handcraft Bag from Concepción de Ataco

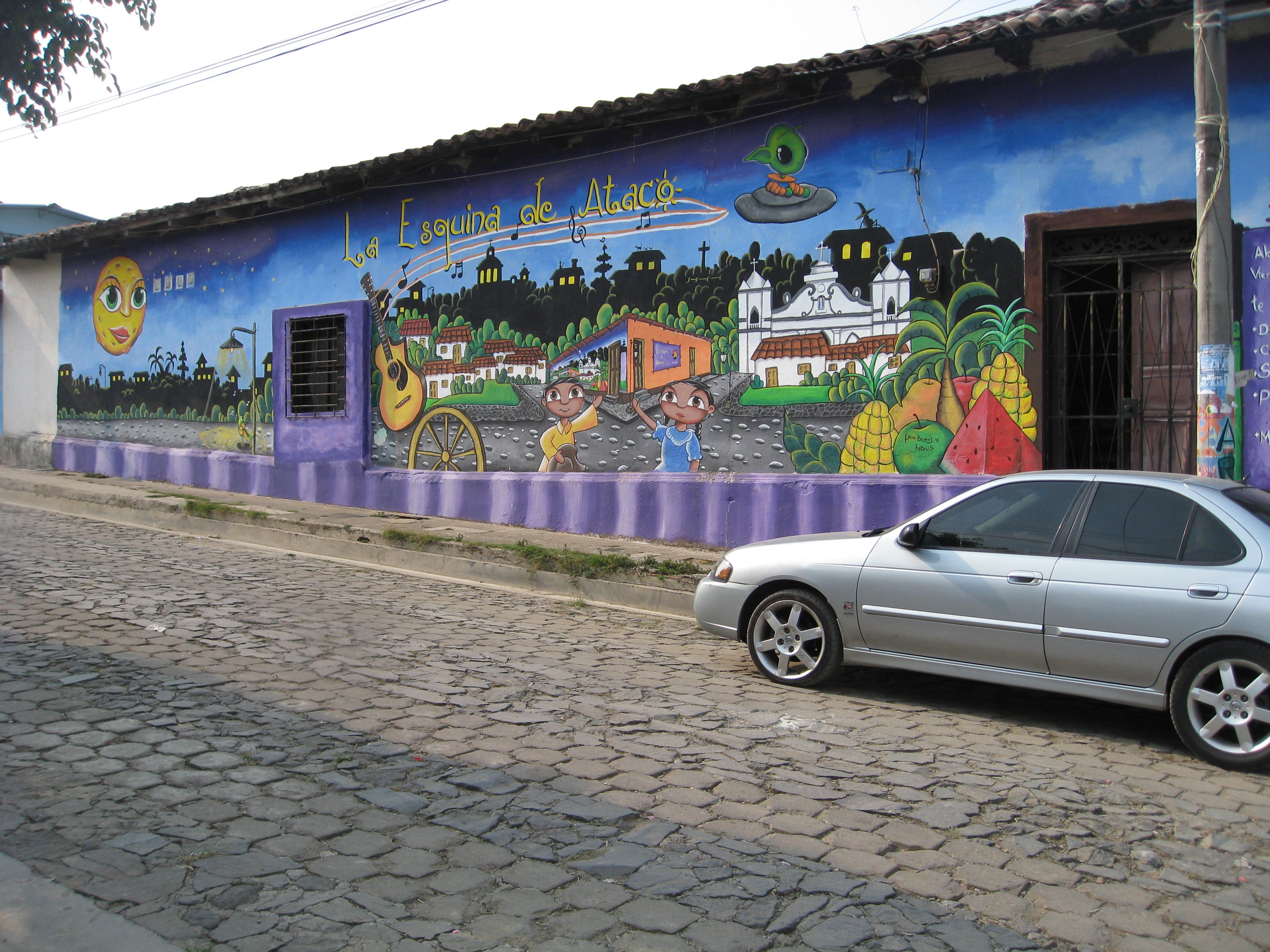
Colonial life themed mural in Ataco

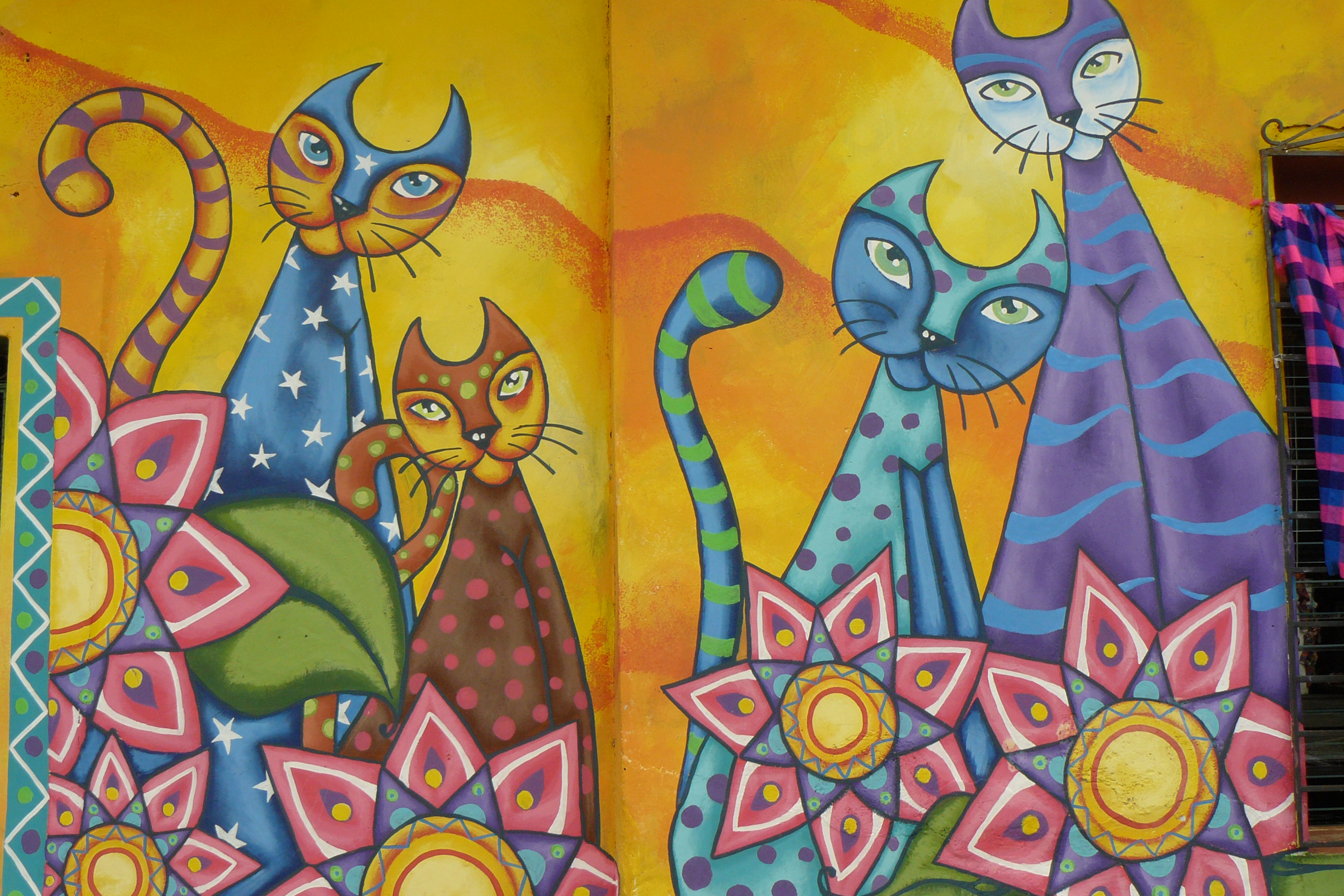
Cat themed mural

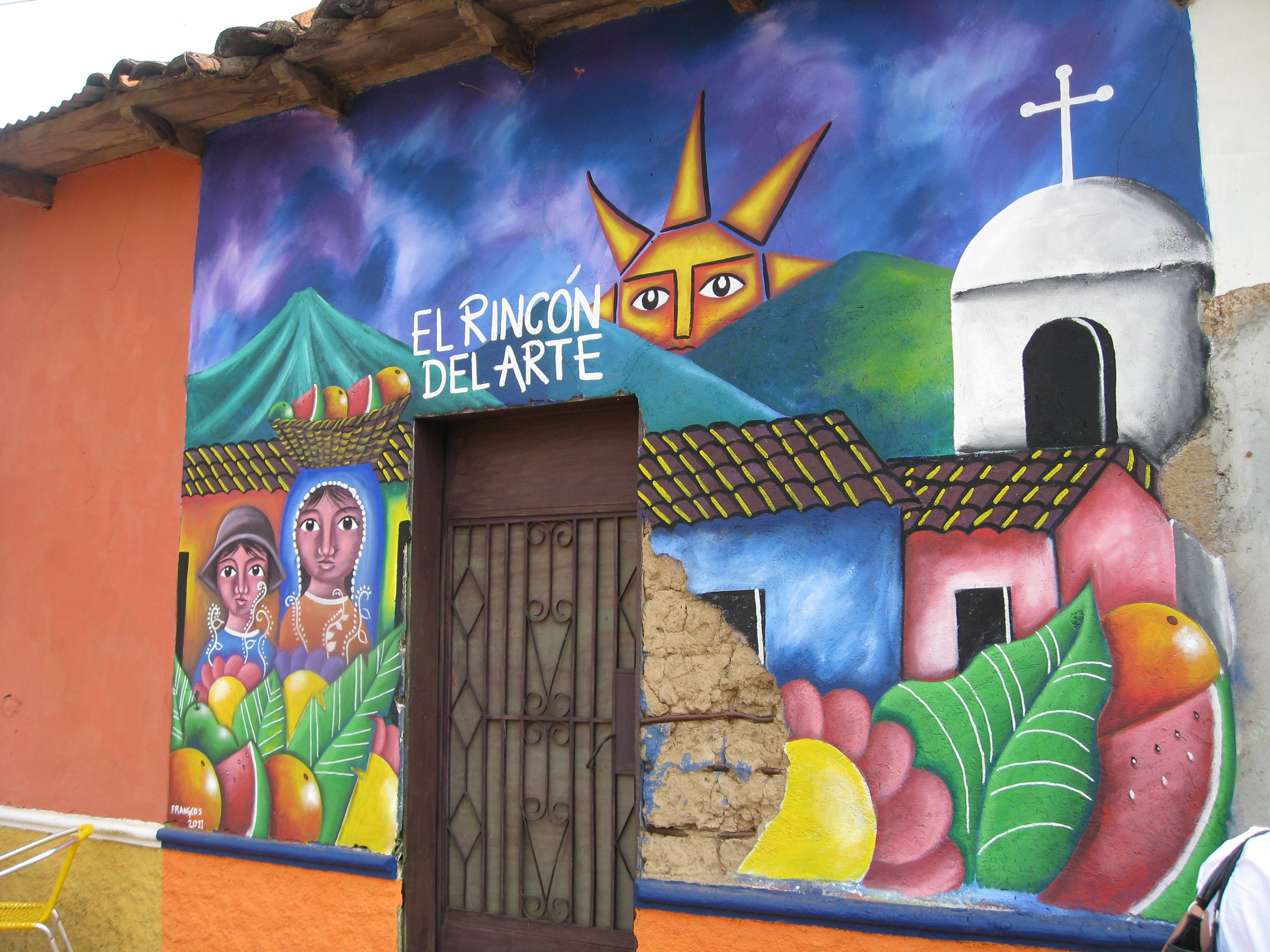
Colonial lofe themed mural

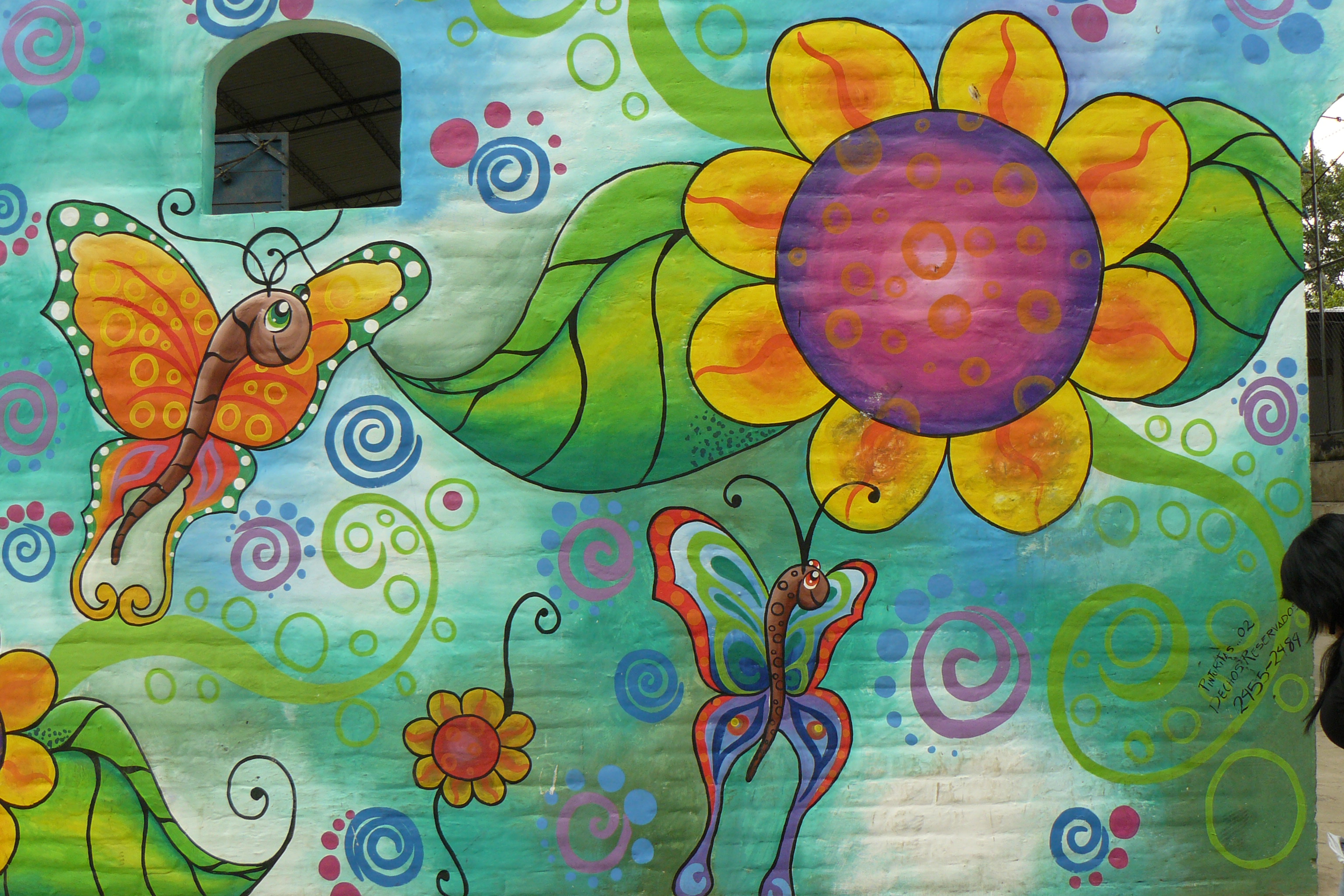
flora and fauna mural

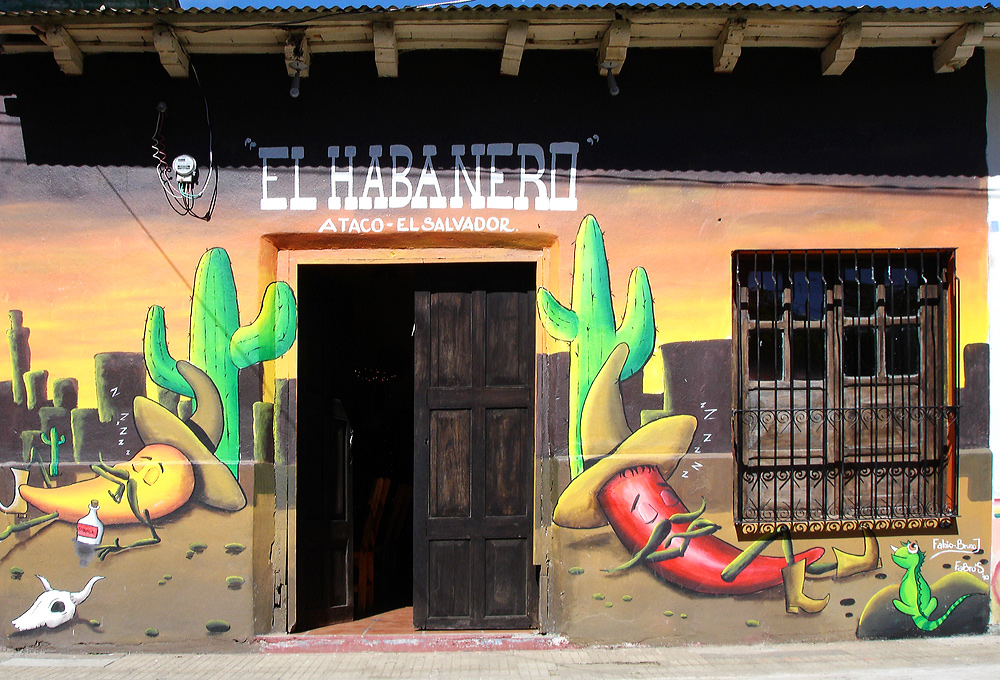
Desert themed mural

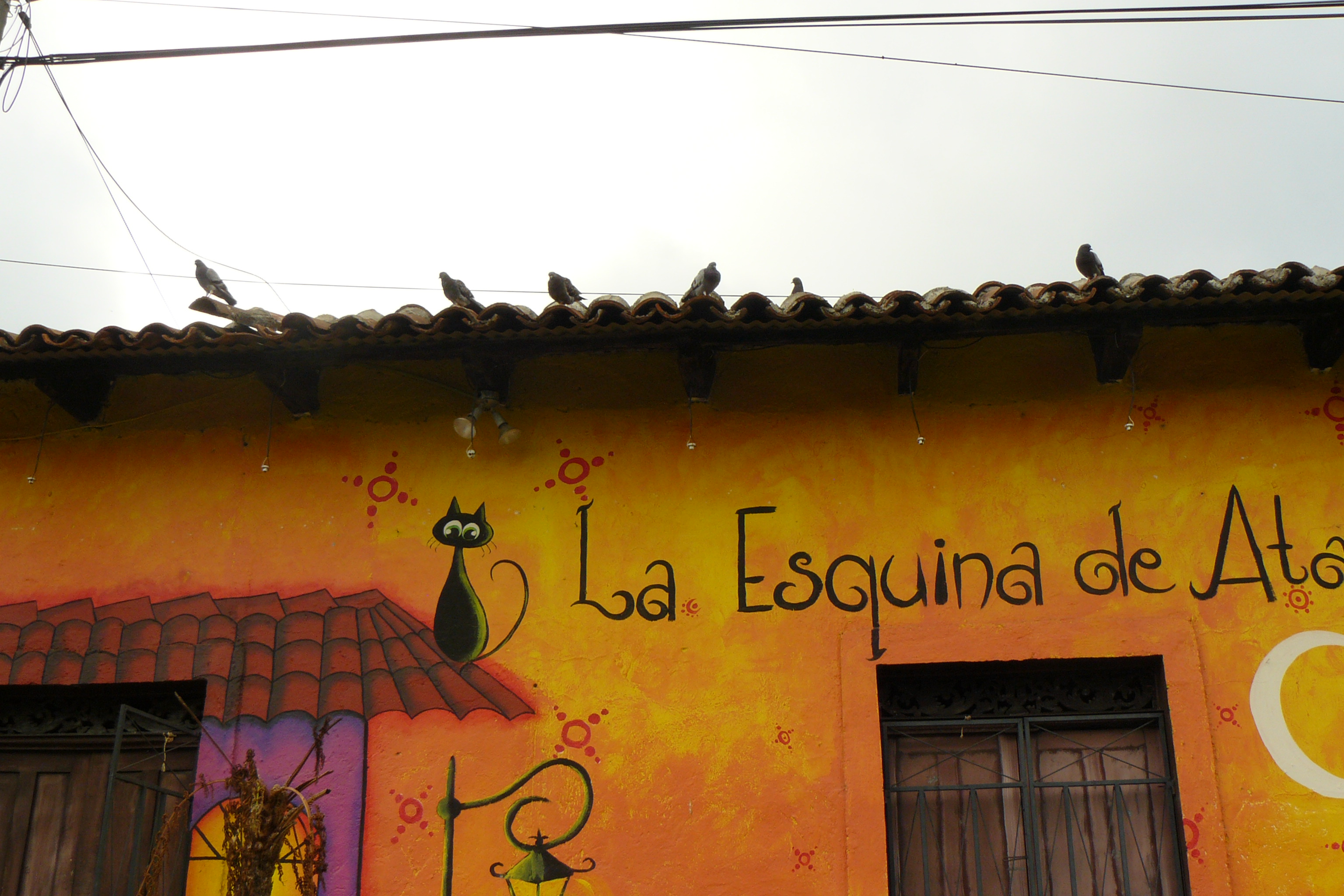
Cat themed mural

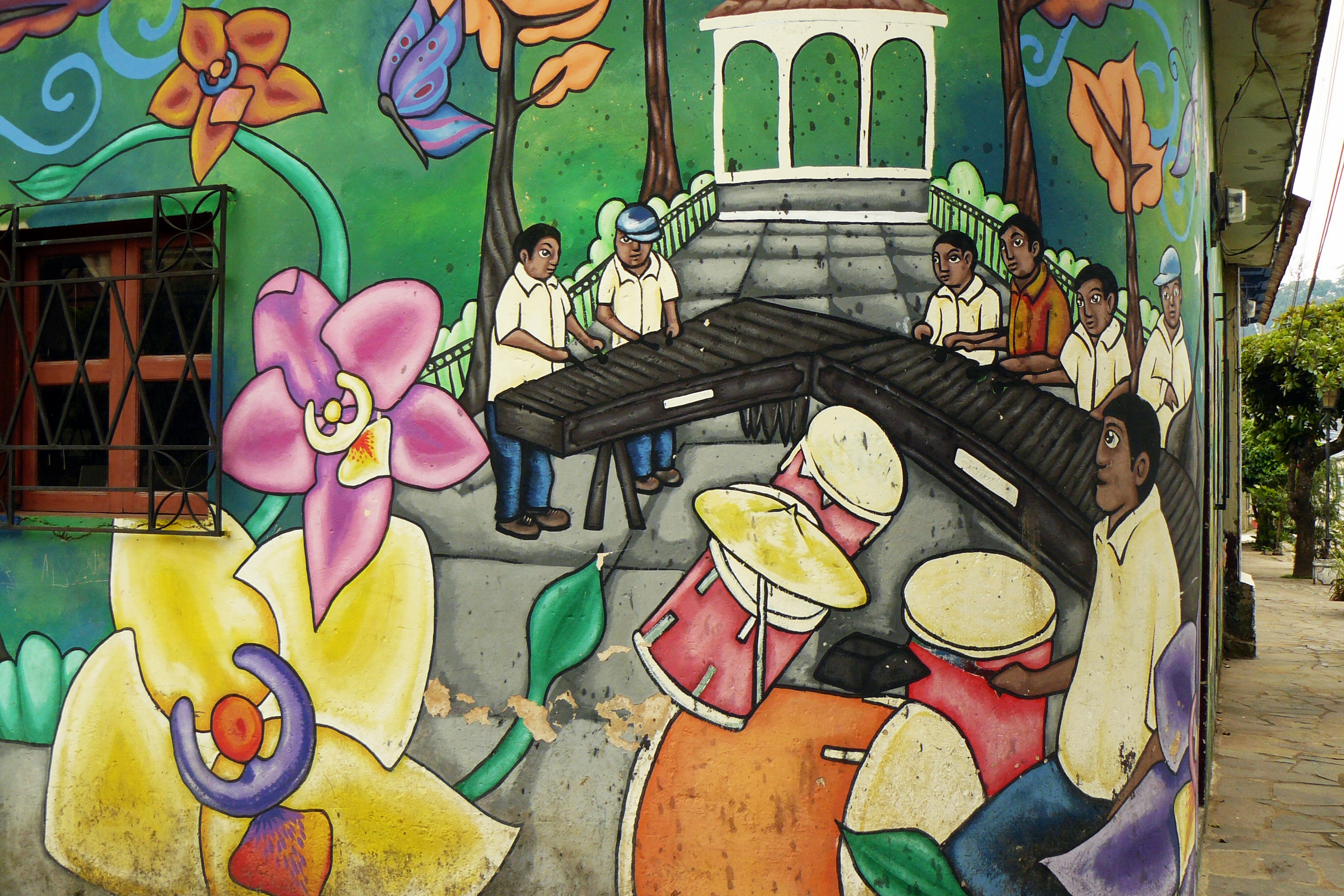
Colonial men themed mural

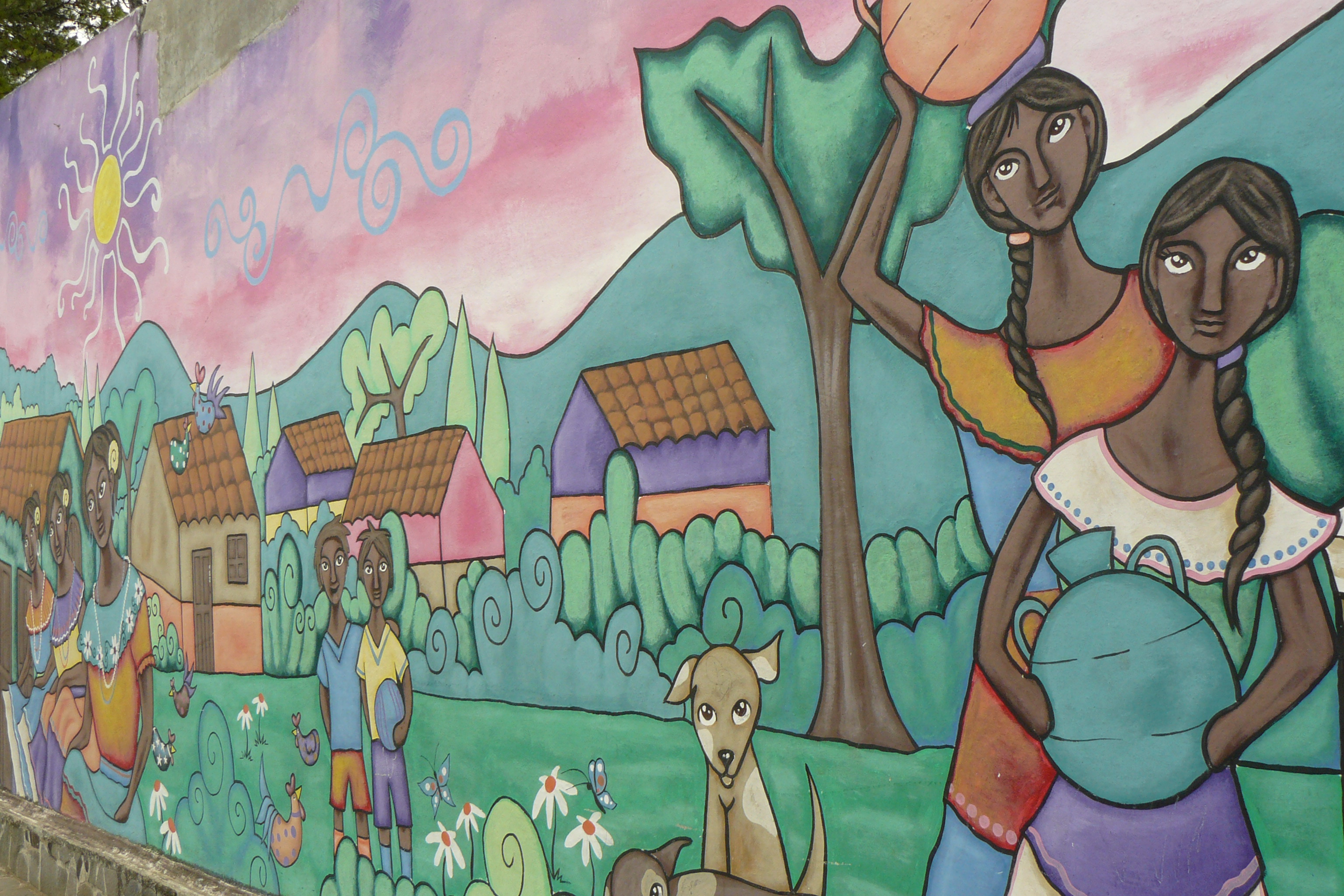
Colonial women themed mural

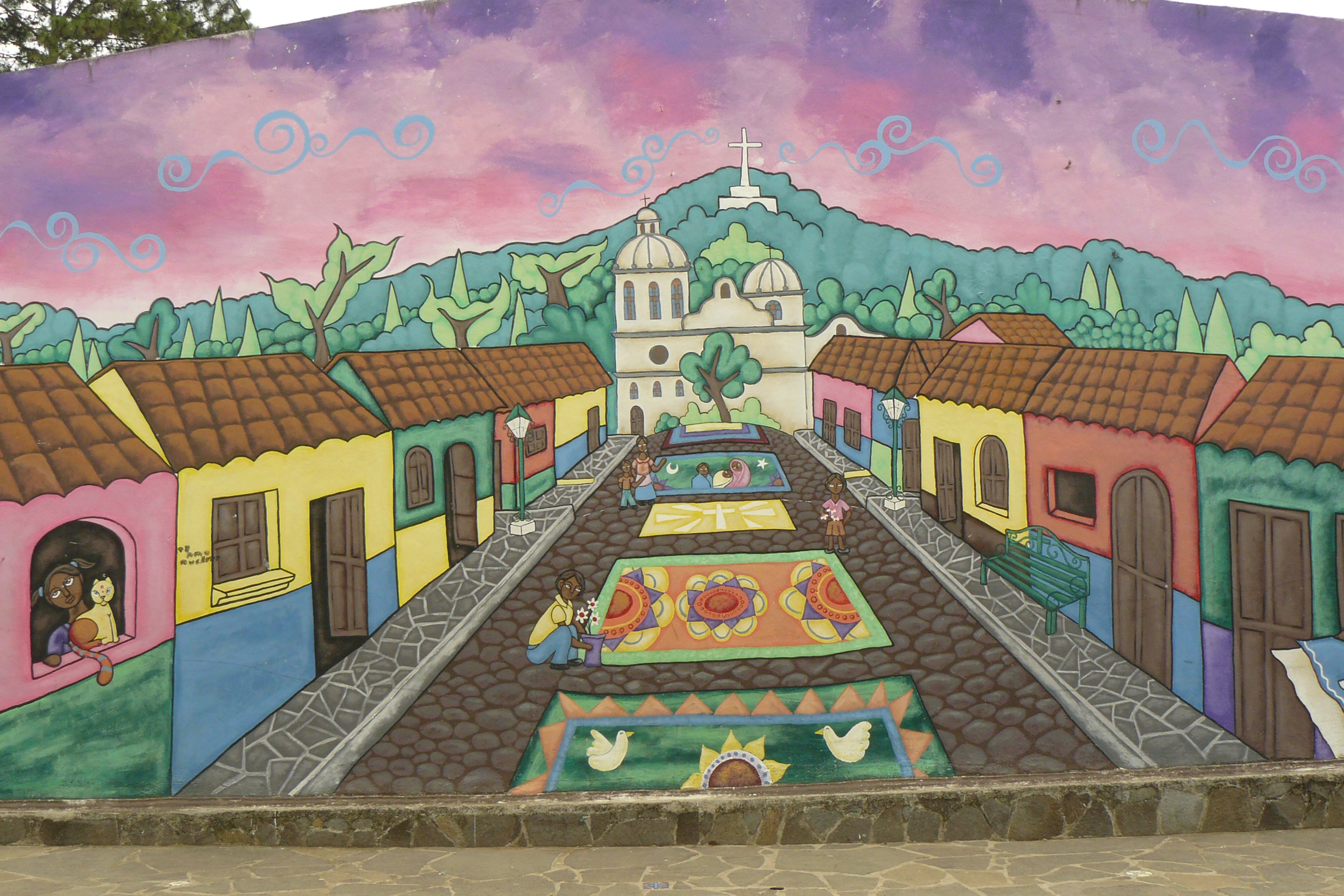
Rug festival themed mural

=== Civil War murals ===
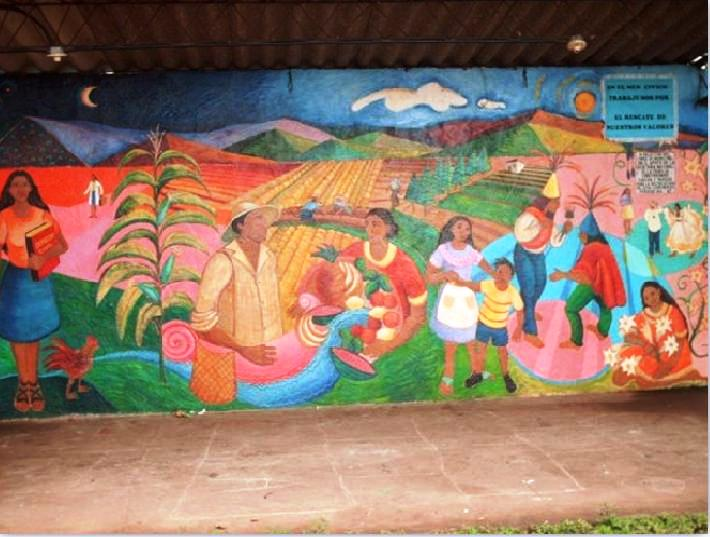
Mural at Perquin

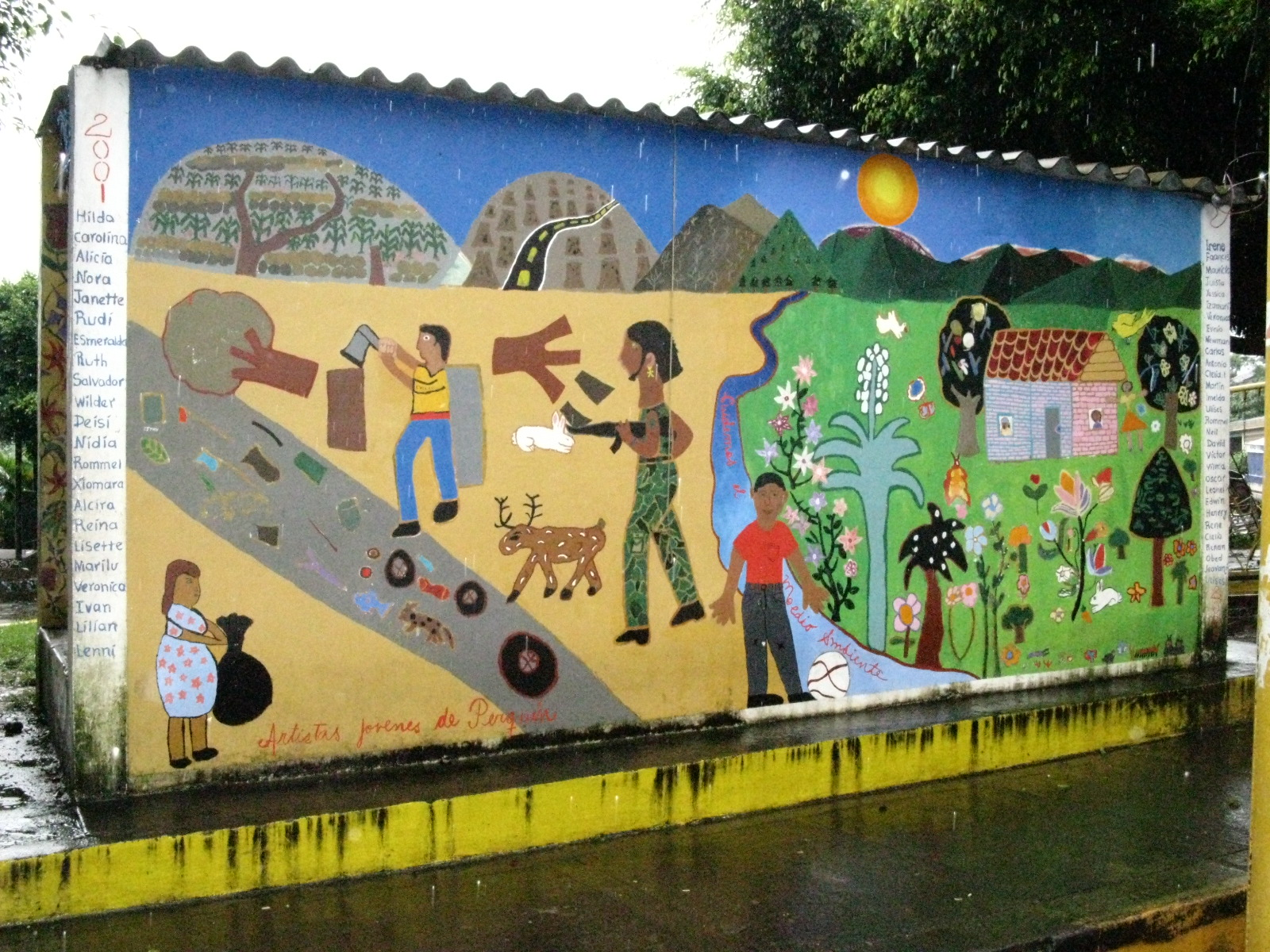
Mural at Perquin

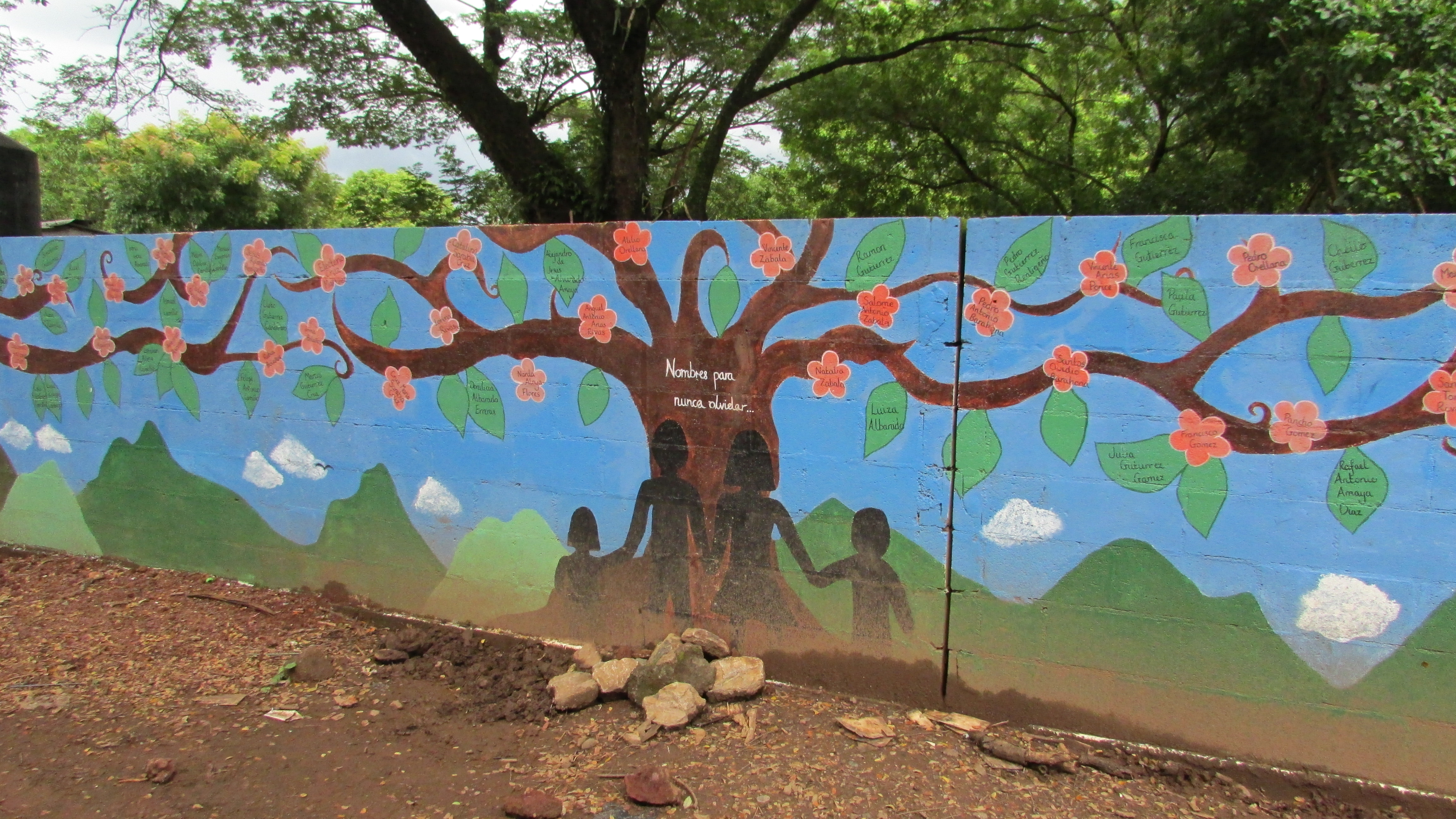
War memorial mural in Nuevo Gualcho

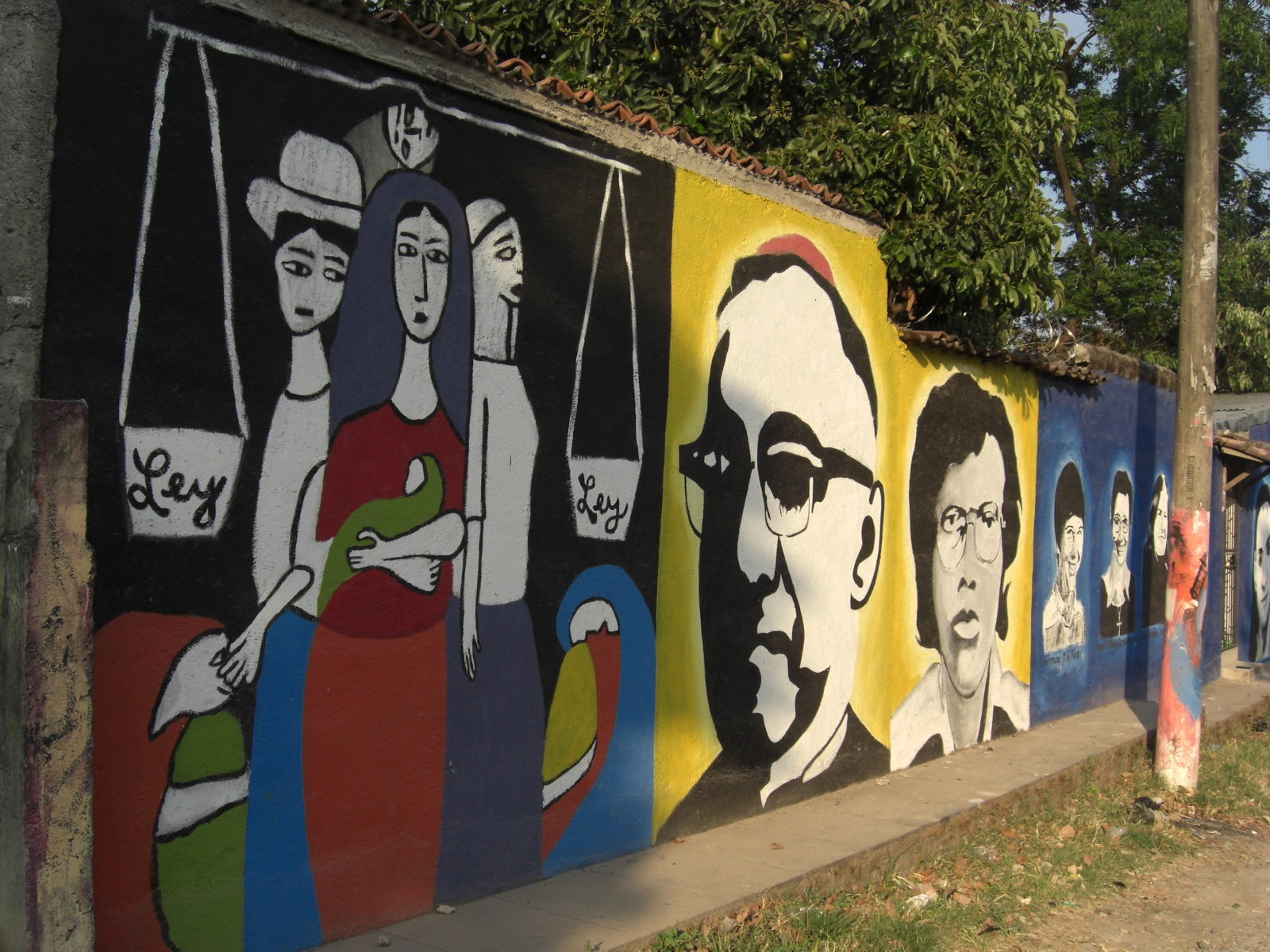
Memorial depicting Oscar Romero and the 1980 murders of U.S. missionaries in El Salvador

=== Ilobasco Crafts ===
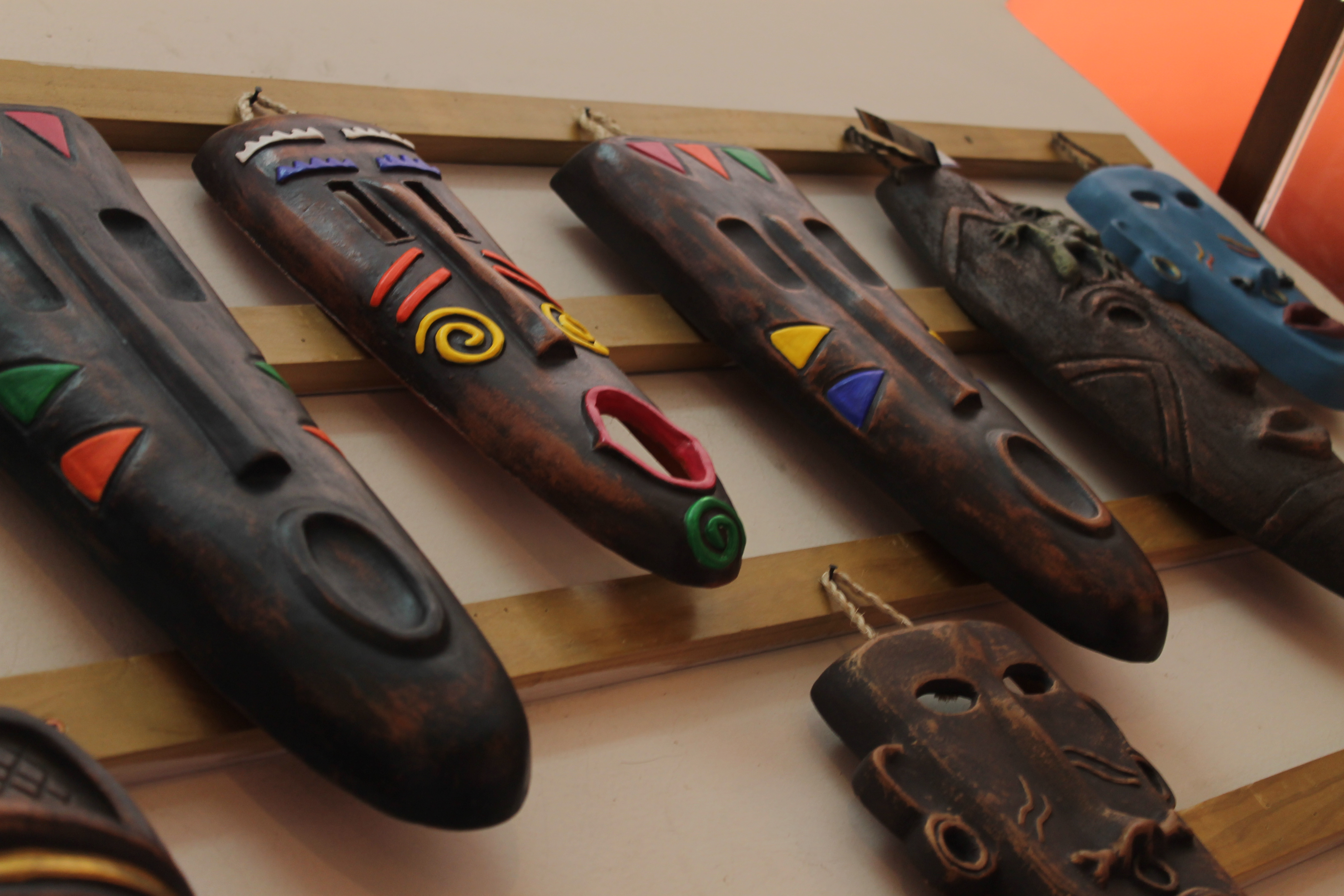
Ceramic masks Ilobasco

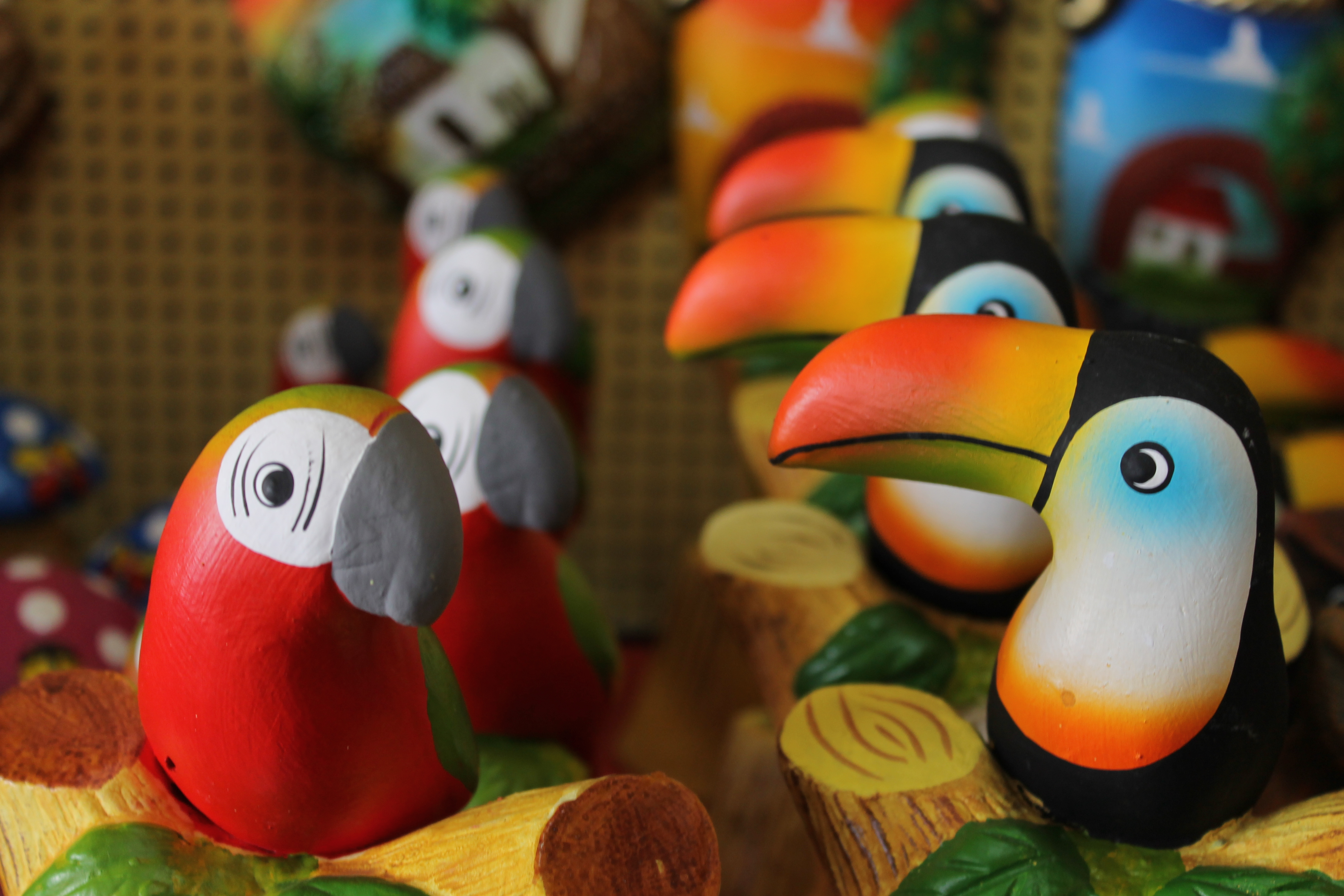
Ceramic toucans Ilobasco

=== Juayua Crafts ===
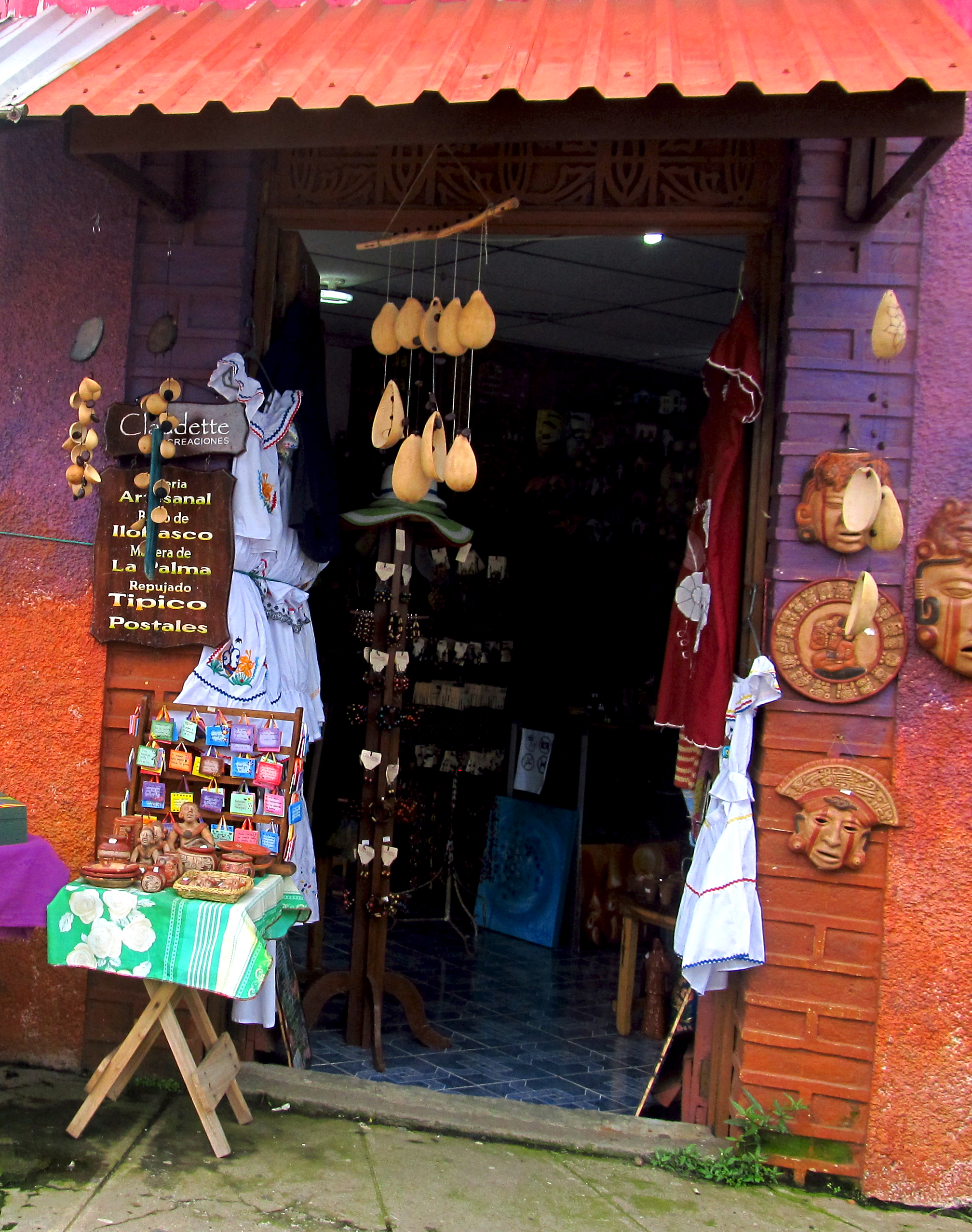
Mesoamerican souvenirs from Juayua

=== Hammocks ===
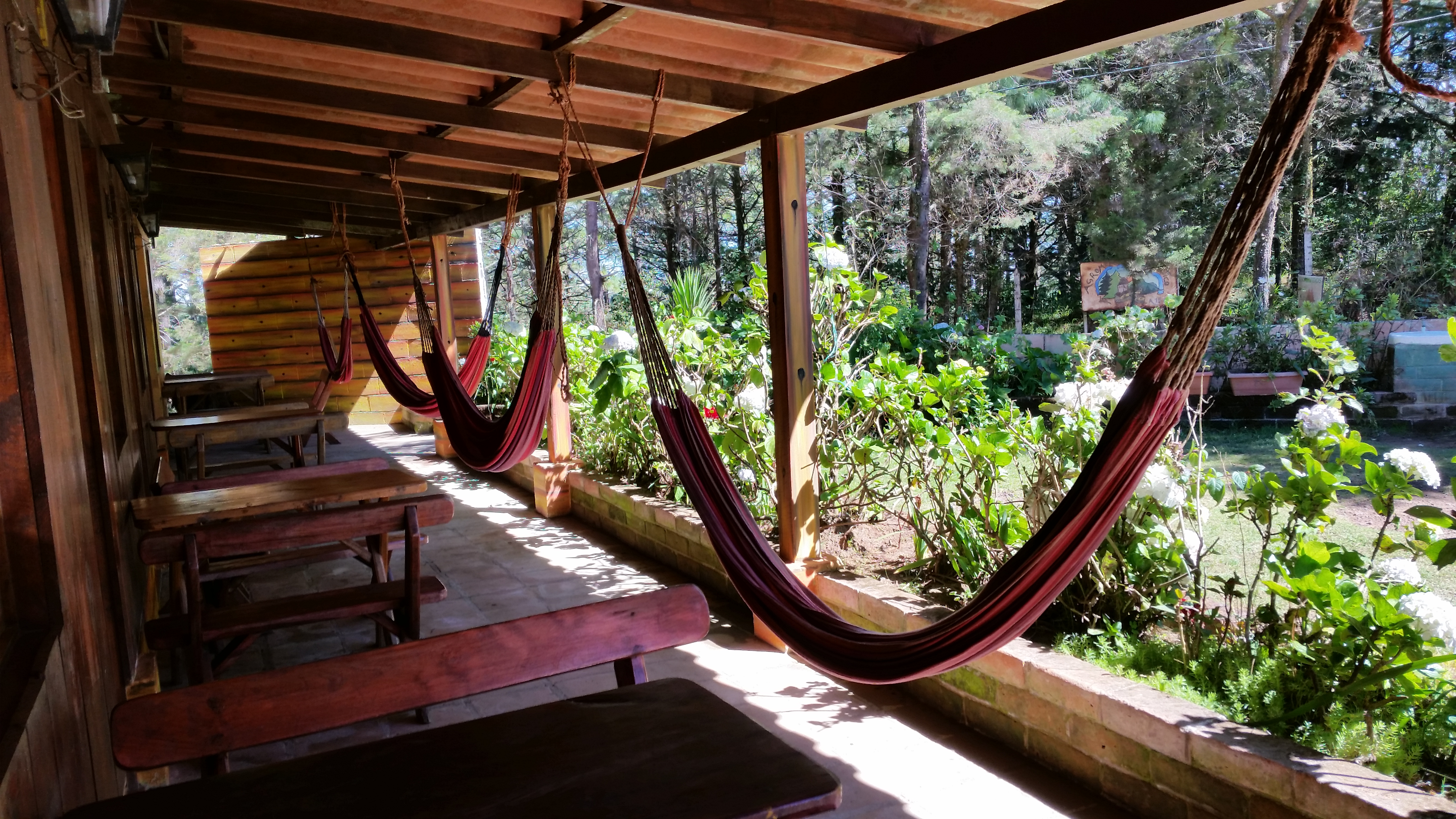
Typical hammocks in El Salvador.

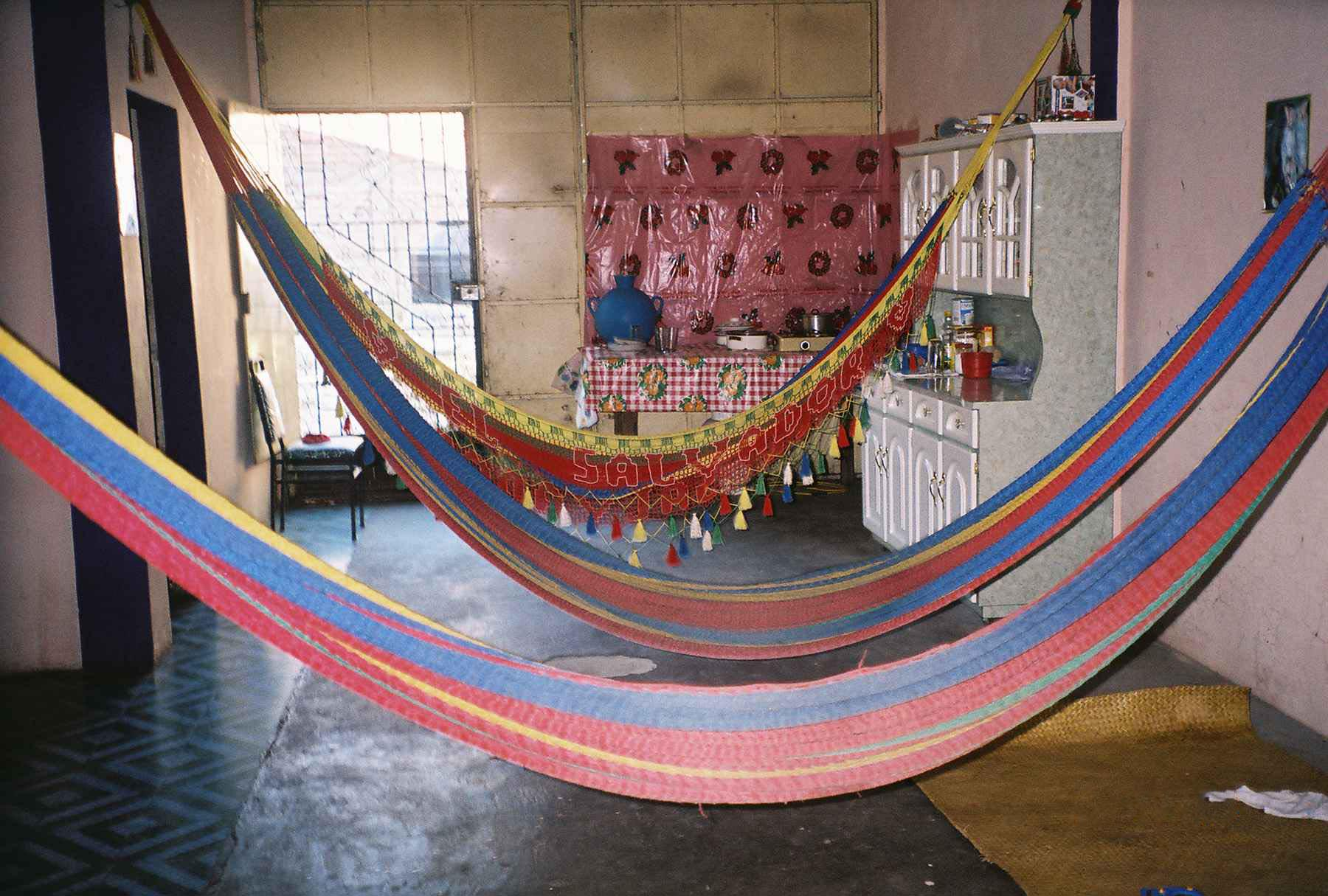
Three Salvadoran synthetic-thread hammocks in Morazán Department

El Salvador is a large producer and exporter of hammocks. The valley in which San Salvador City sits upon is dubbed "The Valley of the Hammocks" because the Native Americans used hammocks to repel constant earthquakes. Later, the colonizing Spaniards used the term as an allusion of earthquakes constantly rocking the valley where San Salvador City is, like a hammock. Hammocks are a big part of Salvadoran culture. Hammocks swing from doorways, inside living rooms, on porches, in outdoor courtyards, and from trees. Just about everywhere a hammock can be seen hung in all social classes of Salvadoran homes.

The municipality of "Concepcion Quezaltepeque" celebrates its traditional Hammocks Festival, where artisans produce and sell hammocks as a tradition that begun in 1989 and has been celebrated every year since then, between the first and second weekend of November, it is “The Festival of the Hammocks”.

== Native American Heritage ==
=== Lithic era ===
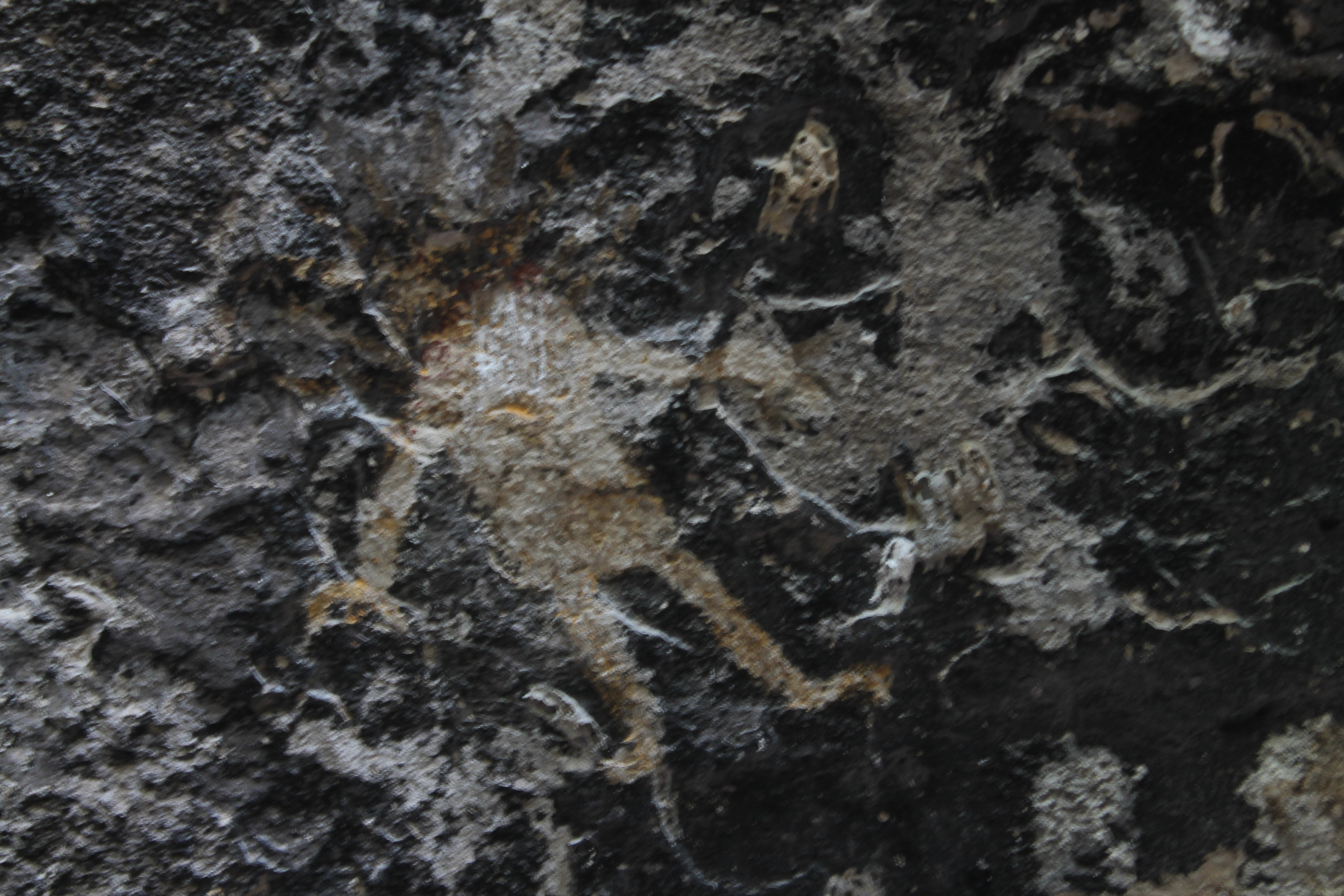
Humanoid petroglyph in Holy Spirit Grotto (corinto cave), Morazan, El Salvador.

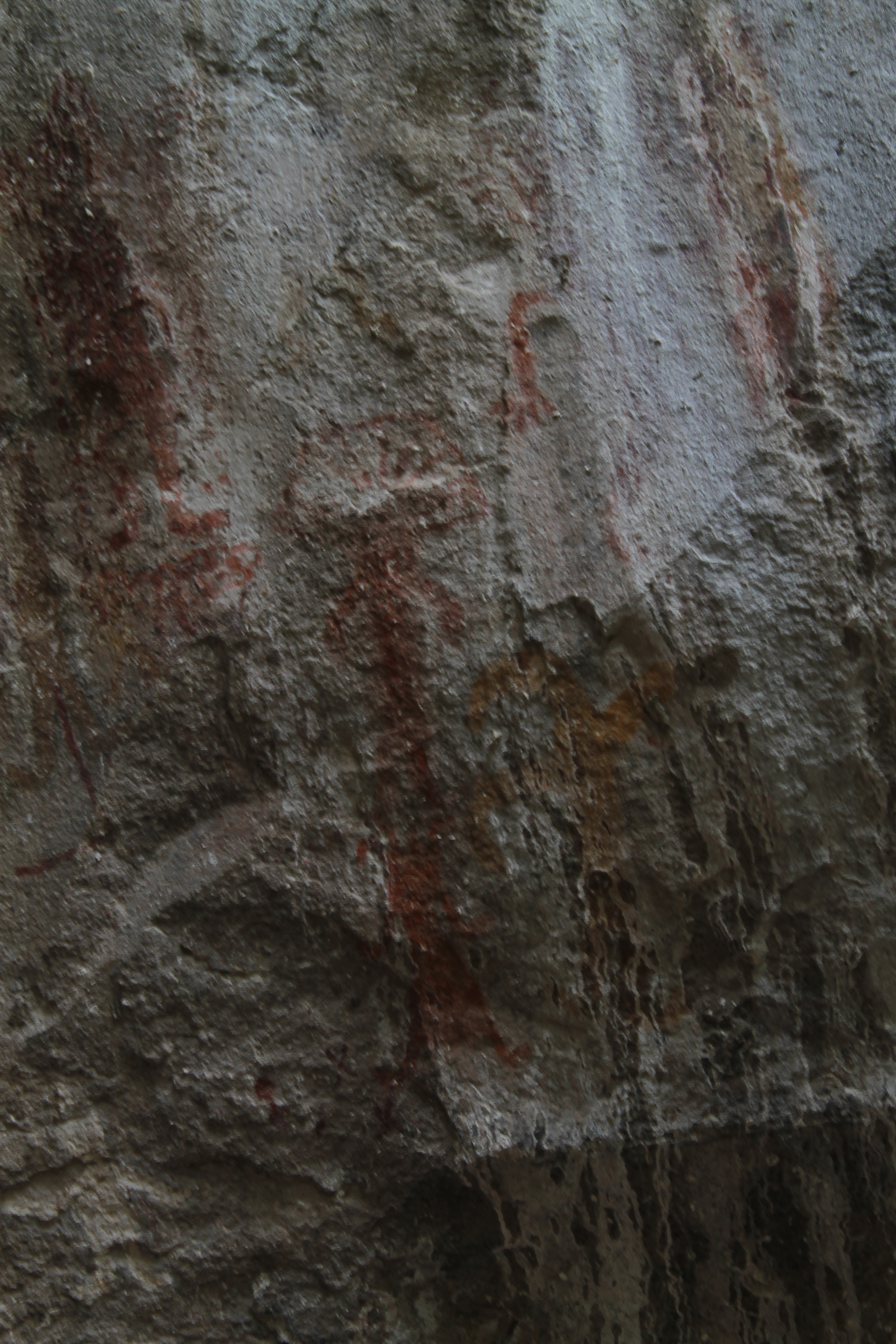
Petroglyphs in Holy Spirit Grotto (corinto cave), Morazan, El Salvador.

El Salvador was inhabited by Paleo-Indians, the first peoples who subsequently inhabited, the Americas during the glacial episodes of the late Pleistocene period. Their intriguing paintings (the earliest of which date from 8000 BC) can still be seen and marveled at in caves outside the towns of Corinto and Cacaopera, both in Morazán. Originating in the Paleolithic period, these cave paintings exhibit the earliest traces of human life in El Salvador; these early Native Americans people used the cave as a refuge, Paleoindian artists created cave and rock paintings that are located in present-day El Salvador.

The Lencas later occupied the cave and utilised it as a spiritual place. Other ancient petroglyphs called piedras pintadas (rock paintings) include la Piedra Pintada in San Jose Villanueva, La Libertad and the piedra pintada in San Isidro, Cabañas. The rock petroglyphs in San Jose Villanueva near a cave in (Walter Thilo Deininger National Park) are similar to other ancient rock petroglyph around the country. Regarding the style of the engravings it has been compared by with the petroglyphs of La Peña Herrada (Cuscatlán), el Letrero del Diablo (La Libertad) and la Peña de los Fierros (San Salvador). We can add to the list the sites in Titihuapa, the Cave of Los Fierros and La Cuevona both in ( Cuscatlán ).

=== Archaic Period ===
Native Americans appeared in the Pleistocene era and became the dominant people in the Lithic stage, developing in the Archaic period in North America to the Formative stage, occupying this position for thousands of years until their demise at the end of the 15th and 16th century, spanning the time of the original arrival in the Upper Paleolithic to European colonization of the Americas during the early modern period.

About 40,000 years ago the ancestors of the indigenous people of the Americas split from the rest of the world following the Pleistocene megafauna and then they flourish mightily, evolving in the Americas, from the Lithic stage to the Post-Classic stage, which was brought into an abrupt end about 525 years ago with the infamous mass genocide and cultural extinction caused by Europeans intrusion into the Americas, bringing diseases and colonizing the Americas with warfare, terrorism, extremists radical Christianity and mass massacres. Only some Native American indigenous groups survived that catastrophe, most of them in Mexico, Central America and South America, with Salvadoran indigenous being one of many who have given rise to all modern Native Americans still alive today.

=== Mesoamerican cultures ===
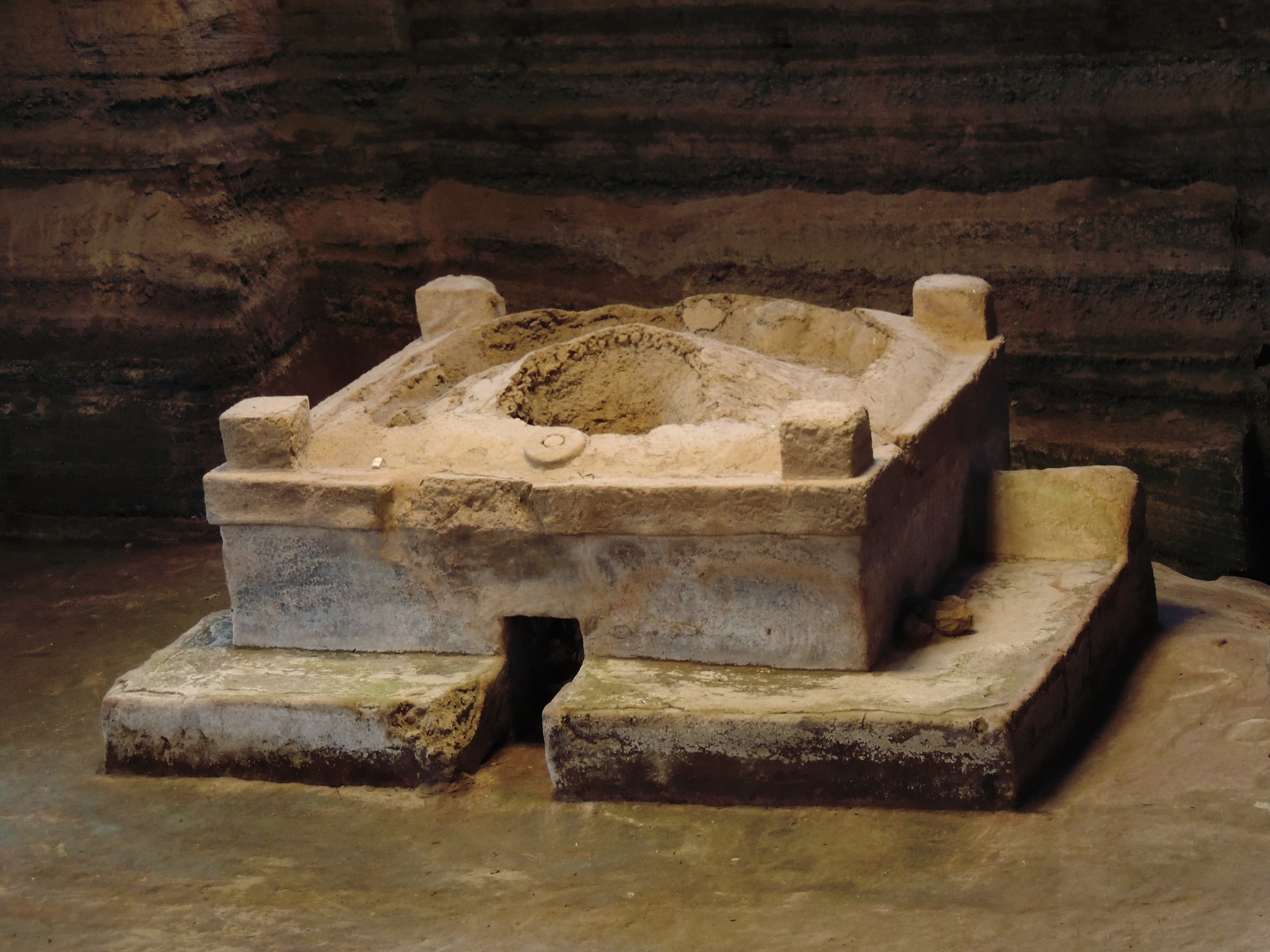
Joya de Cerén

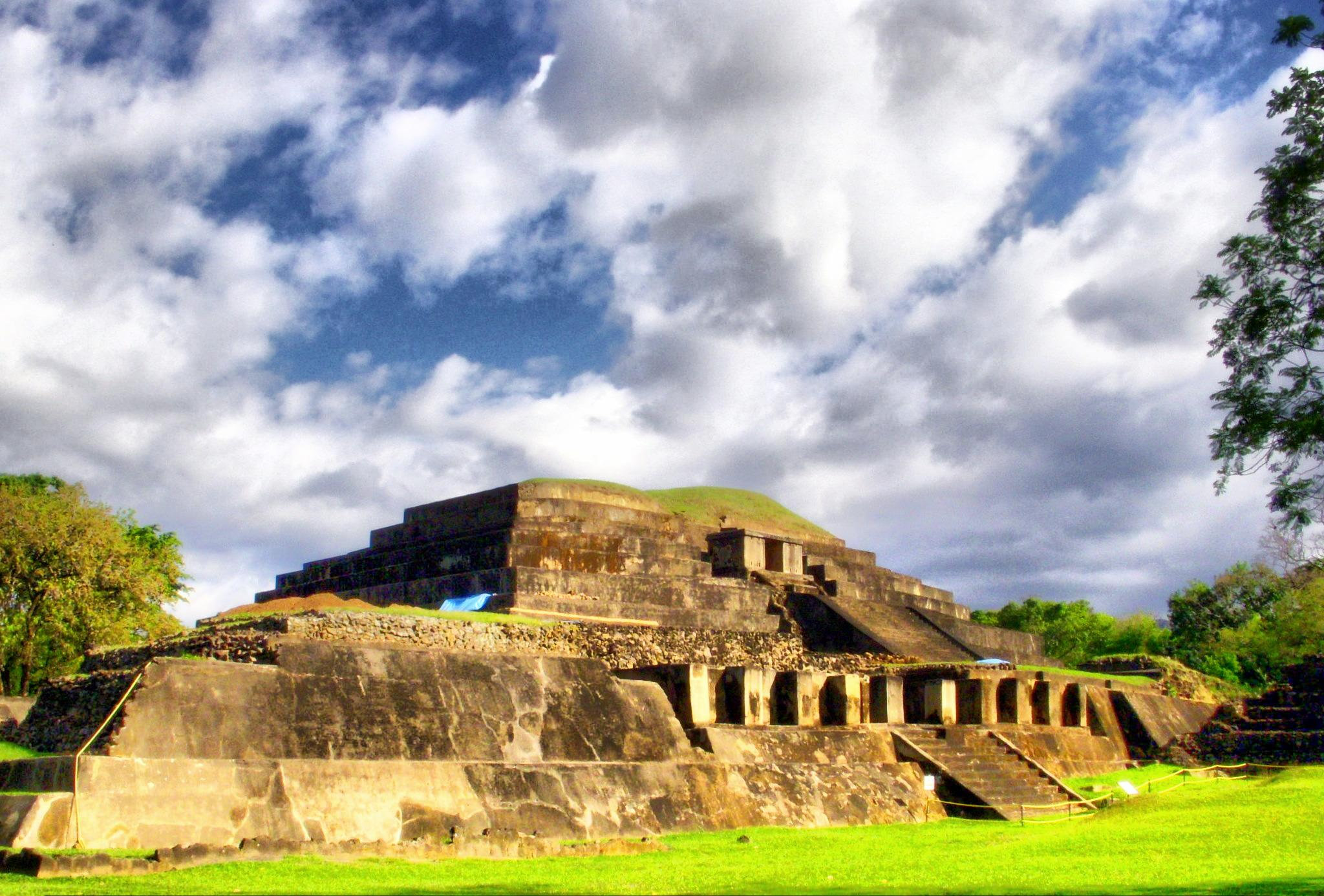
Tazumal

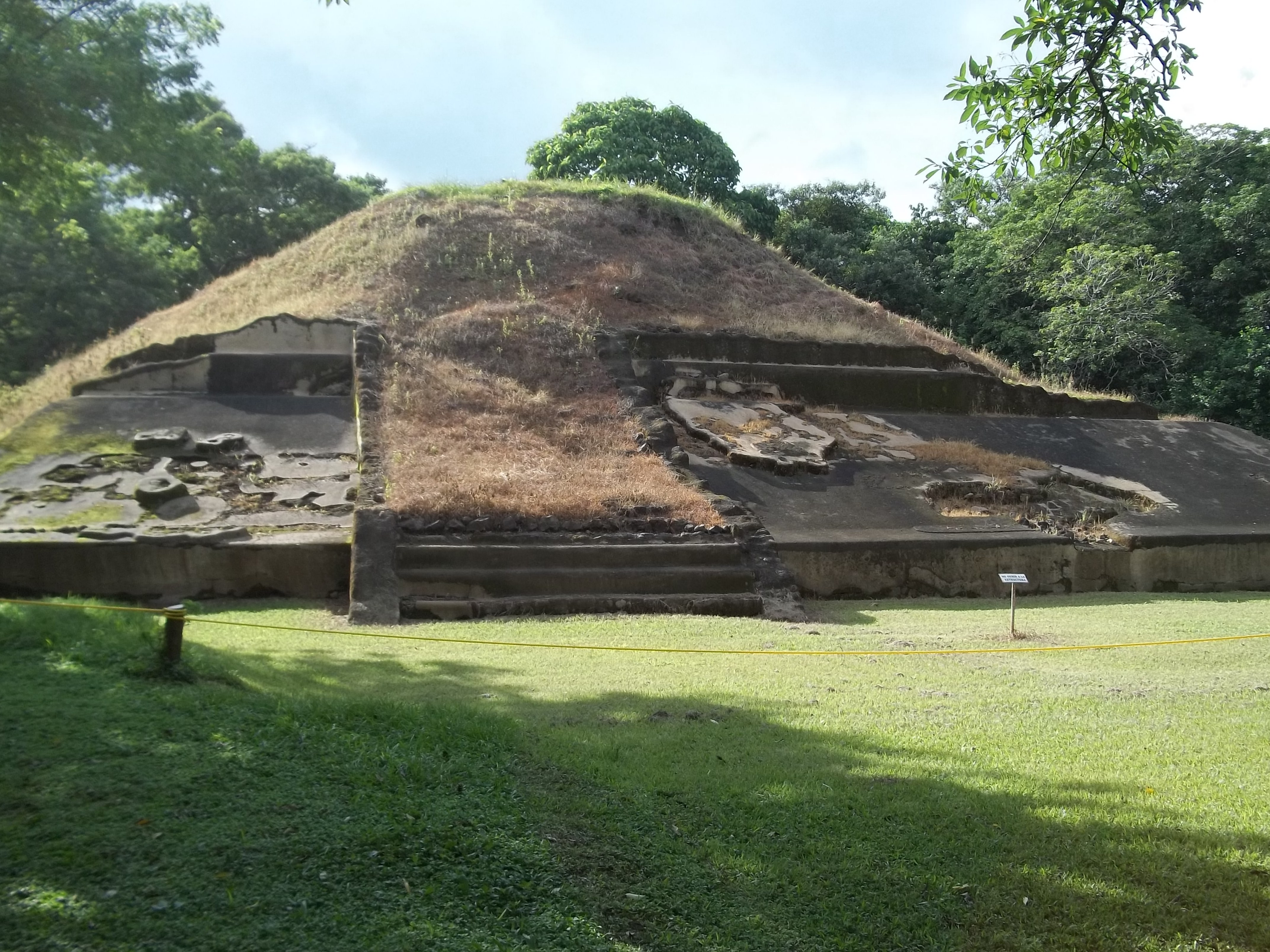
Casa Blanca

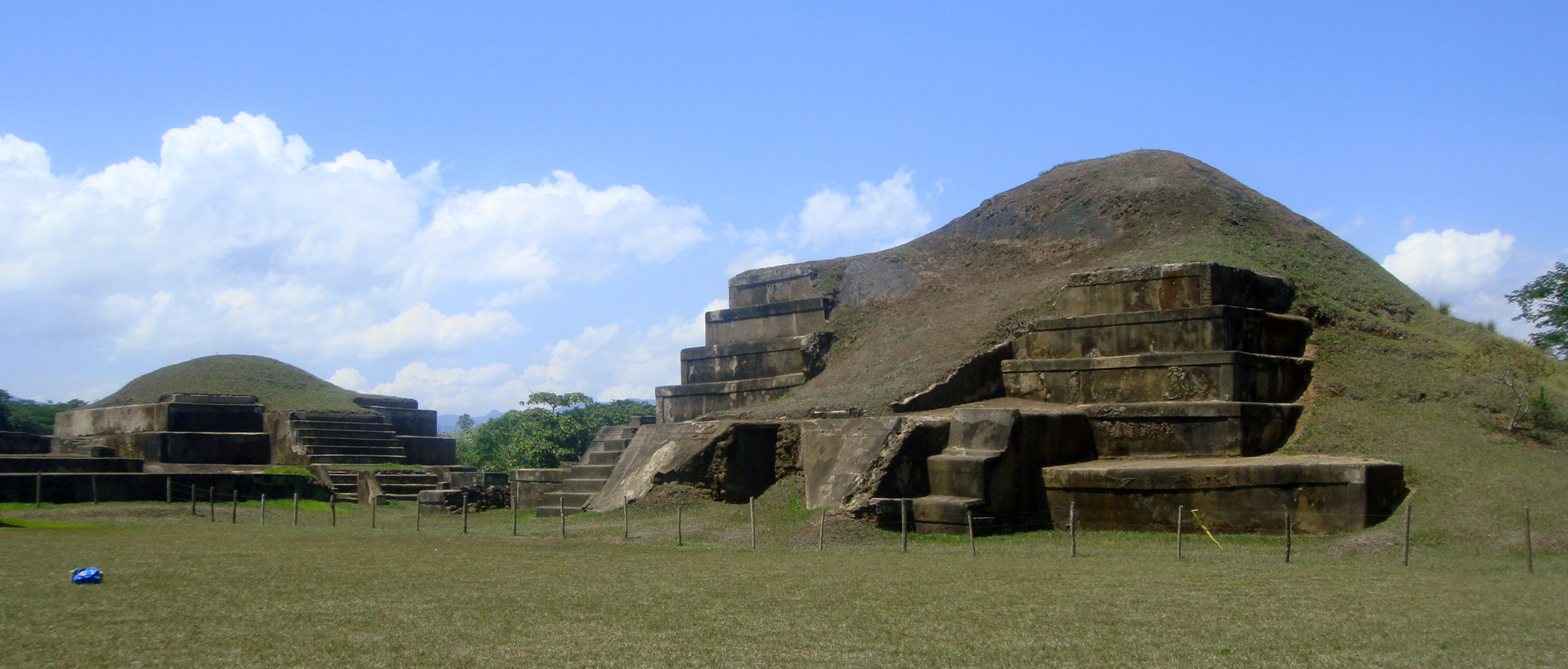
San Andres

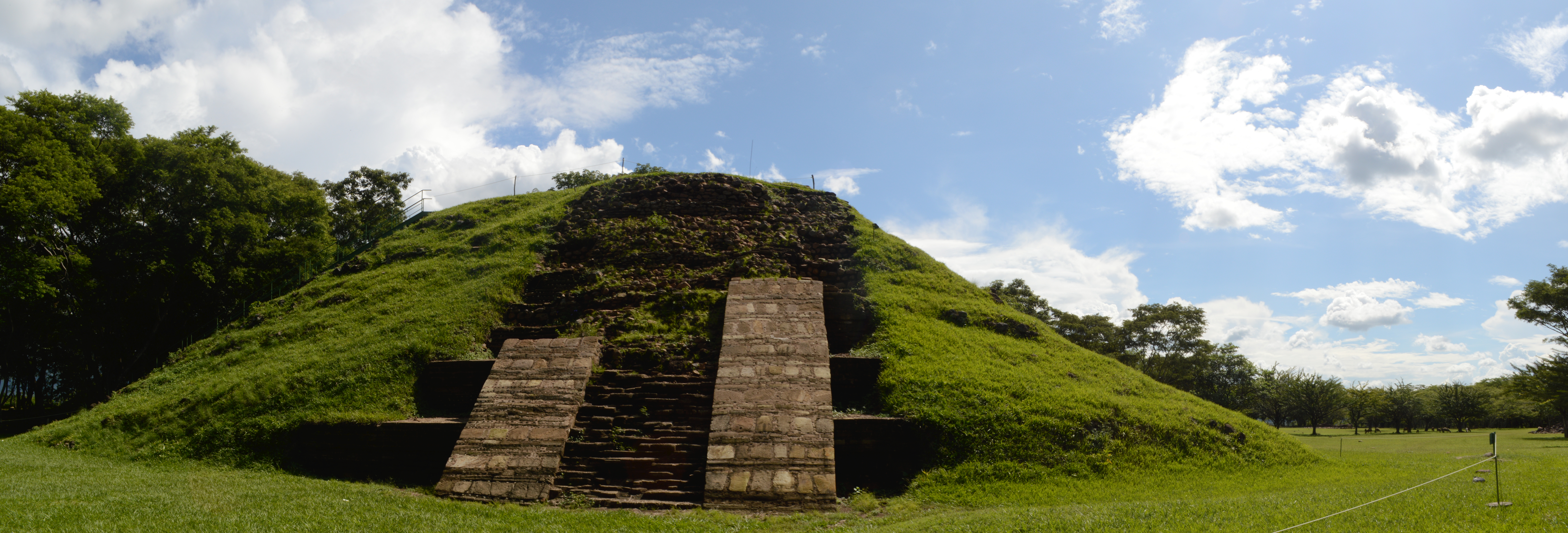
Cihuatán

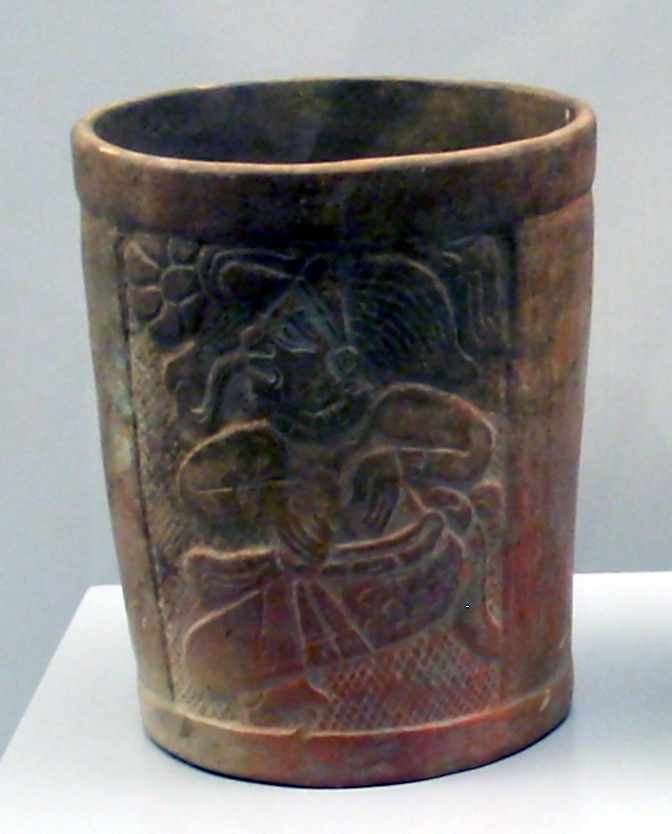
Late Classic Maya cup from El Salvador. 600–900 AD.

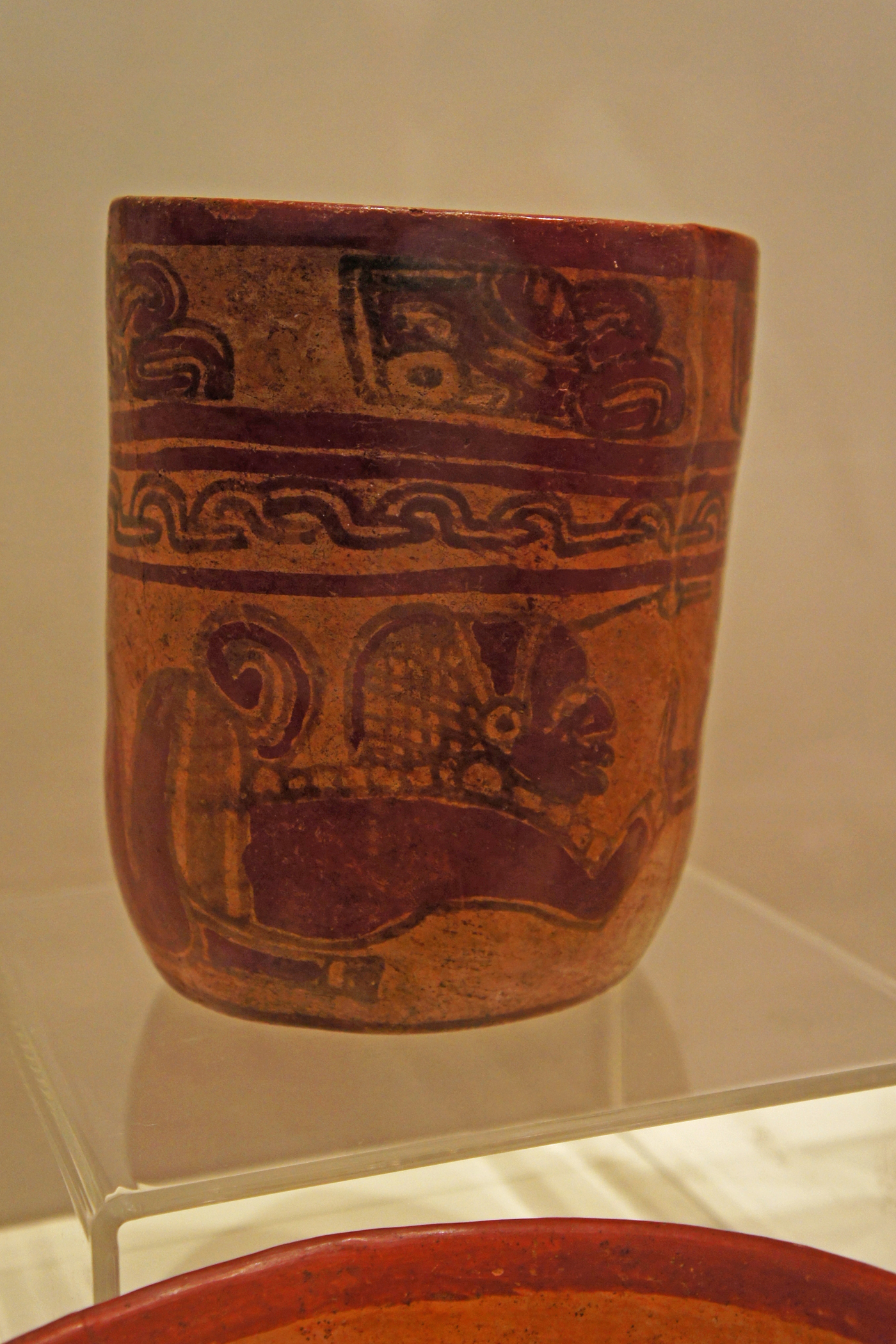
Mayan artifact found at the Joya de Cerén archaeological site

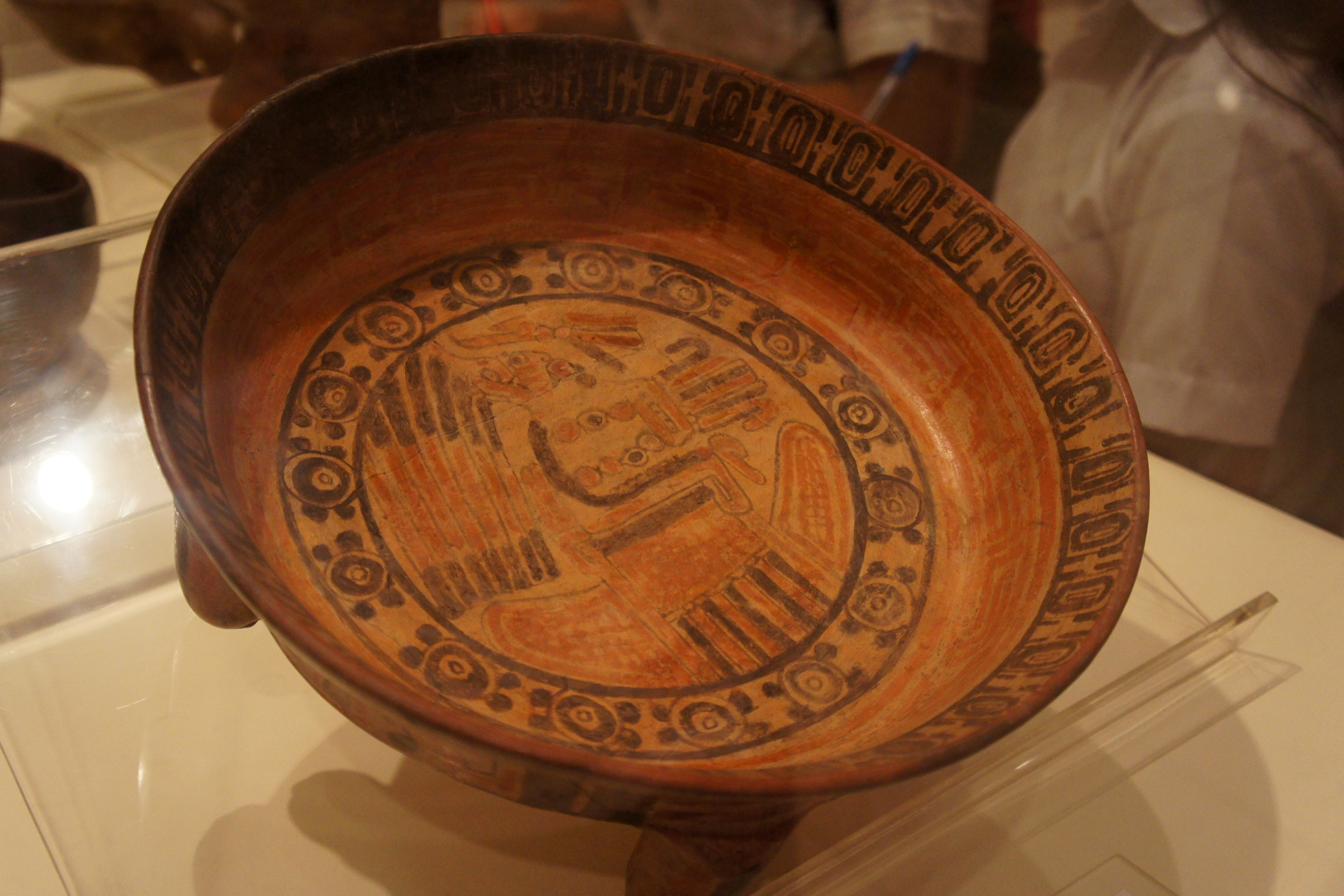
Mayan artifact found at the Joya de Cerén archaeological site

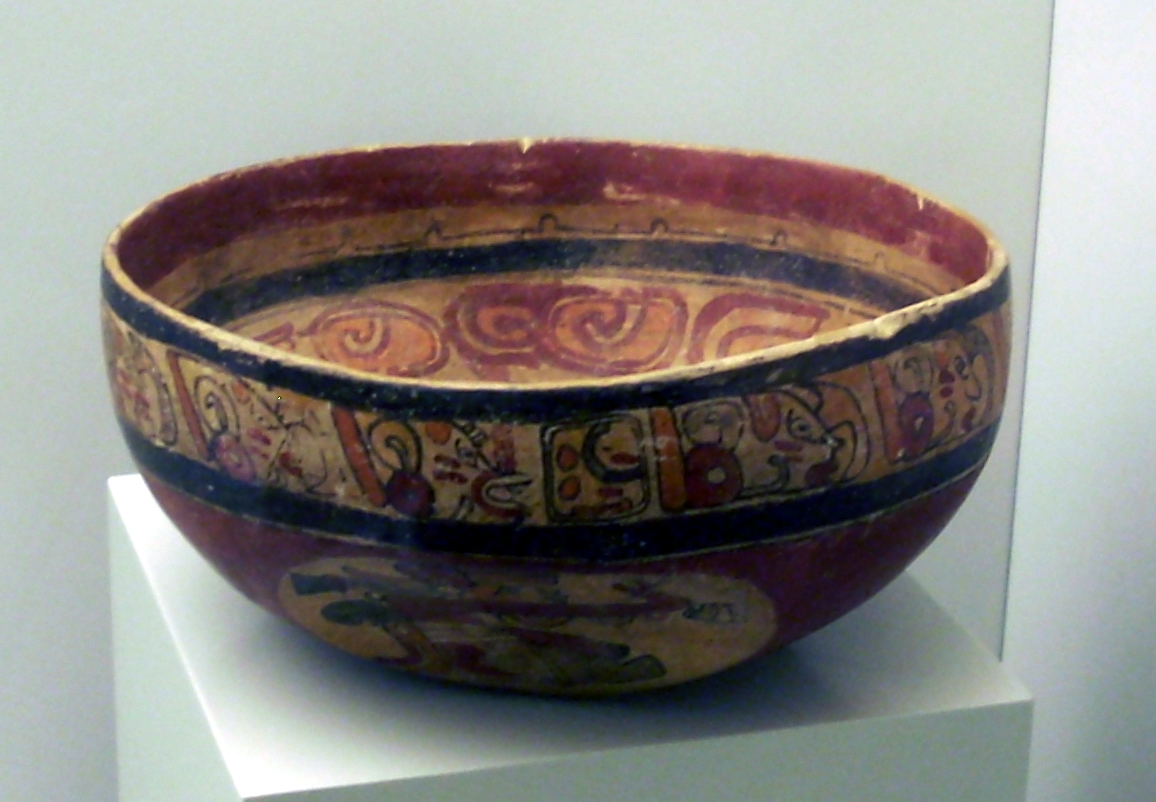
Late Classic Maya bowl, El Copador style, El Salvador.

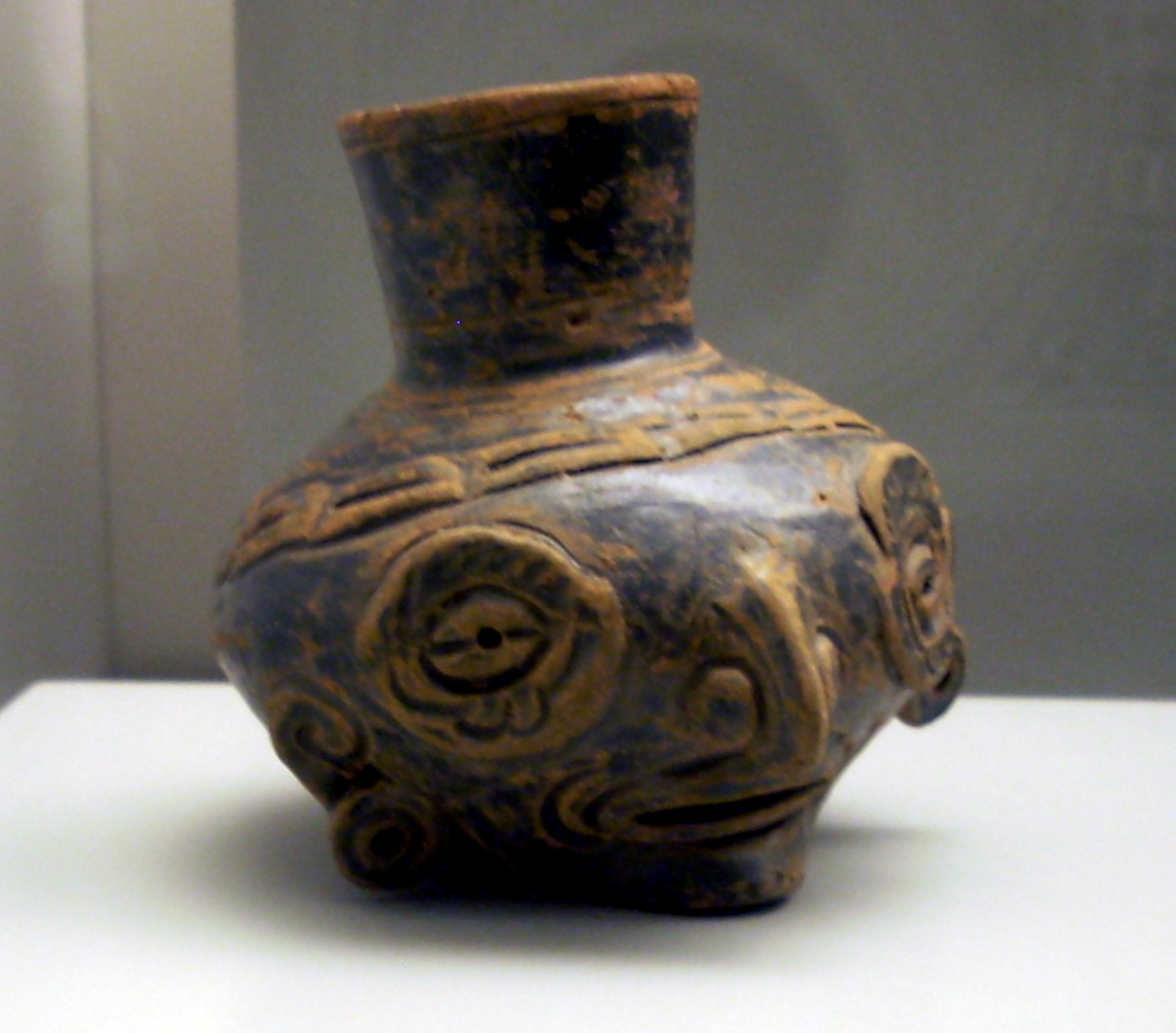
Late Postclassic ceramic vessel from El Salvador, with face decoration. 1200–1520 AD.

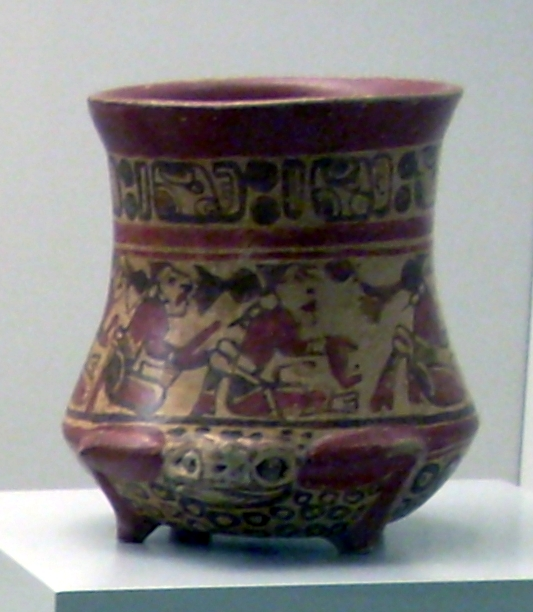
Late Classic Maya vessel from El Salvador, 600–900 AD

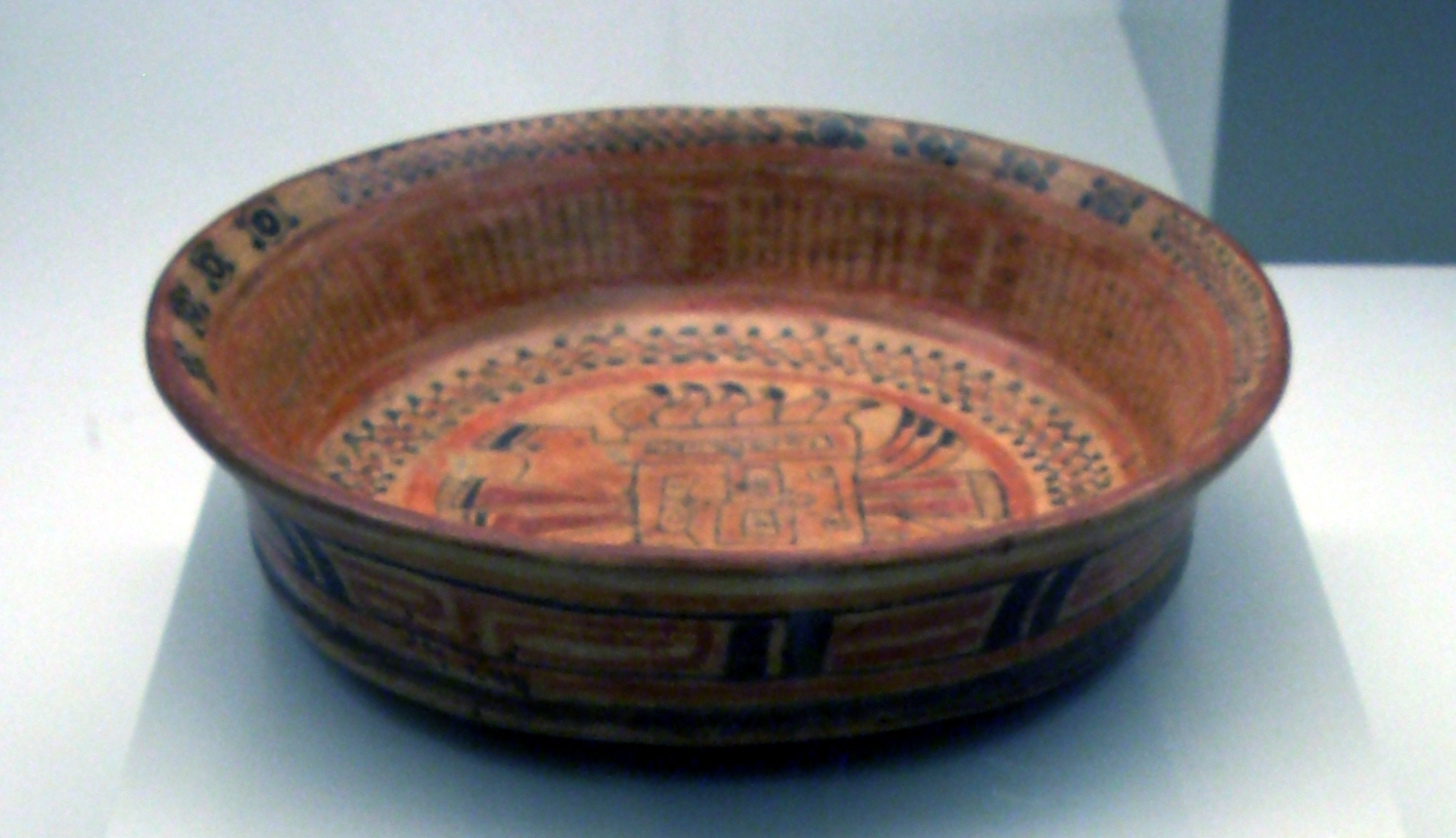
Late Classic Maya plate, El Salvador.

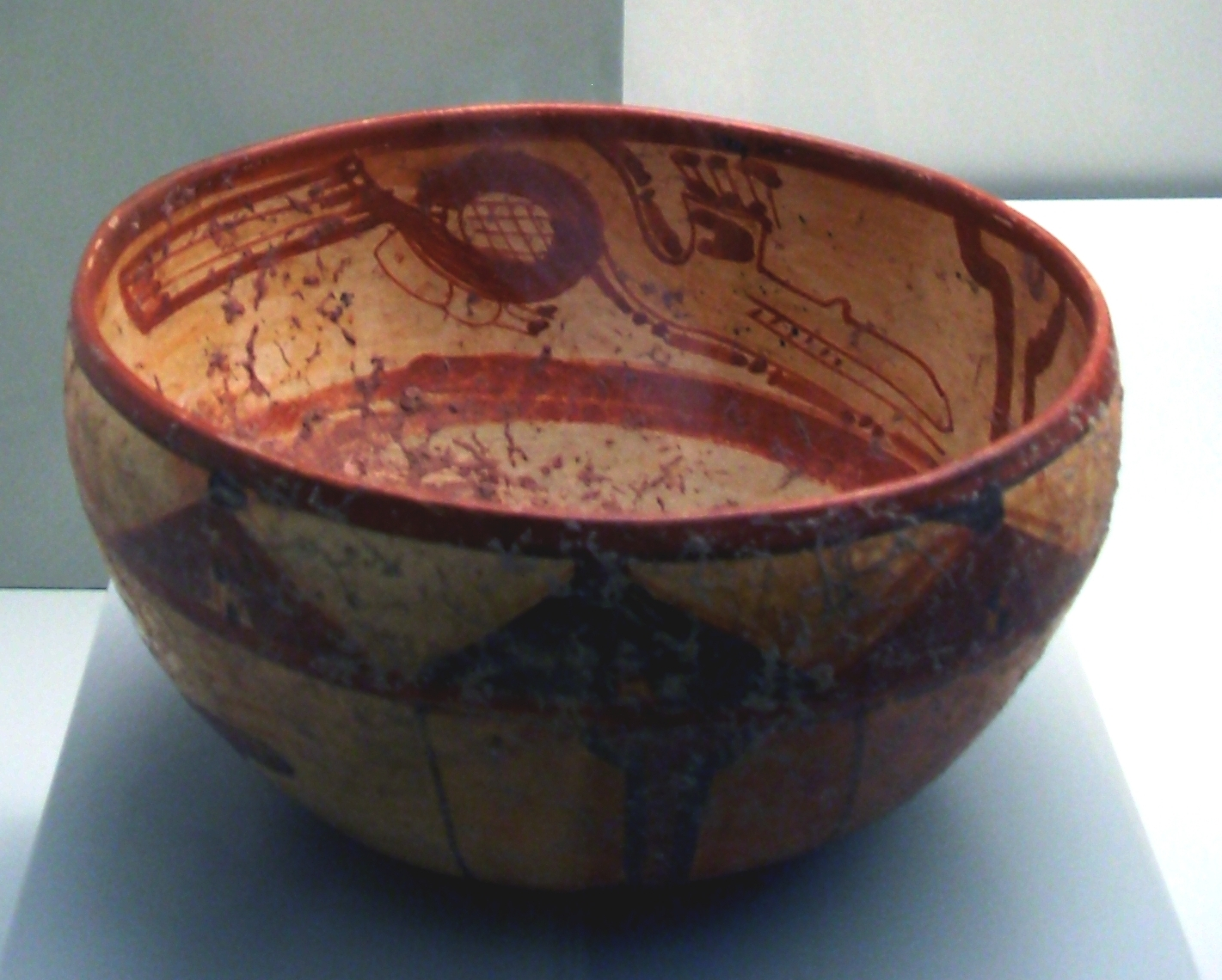
Late Classic Maya bowl from El Salvador.

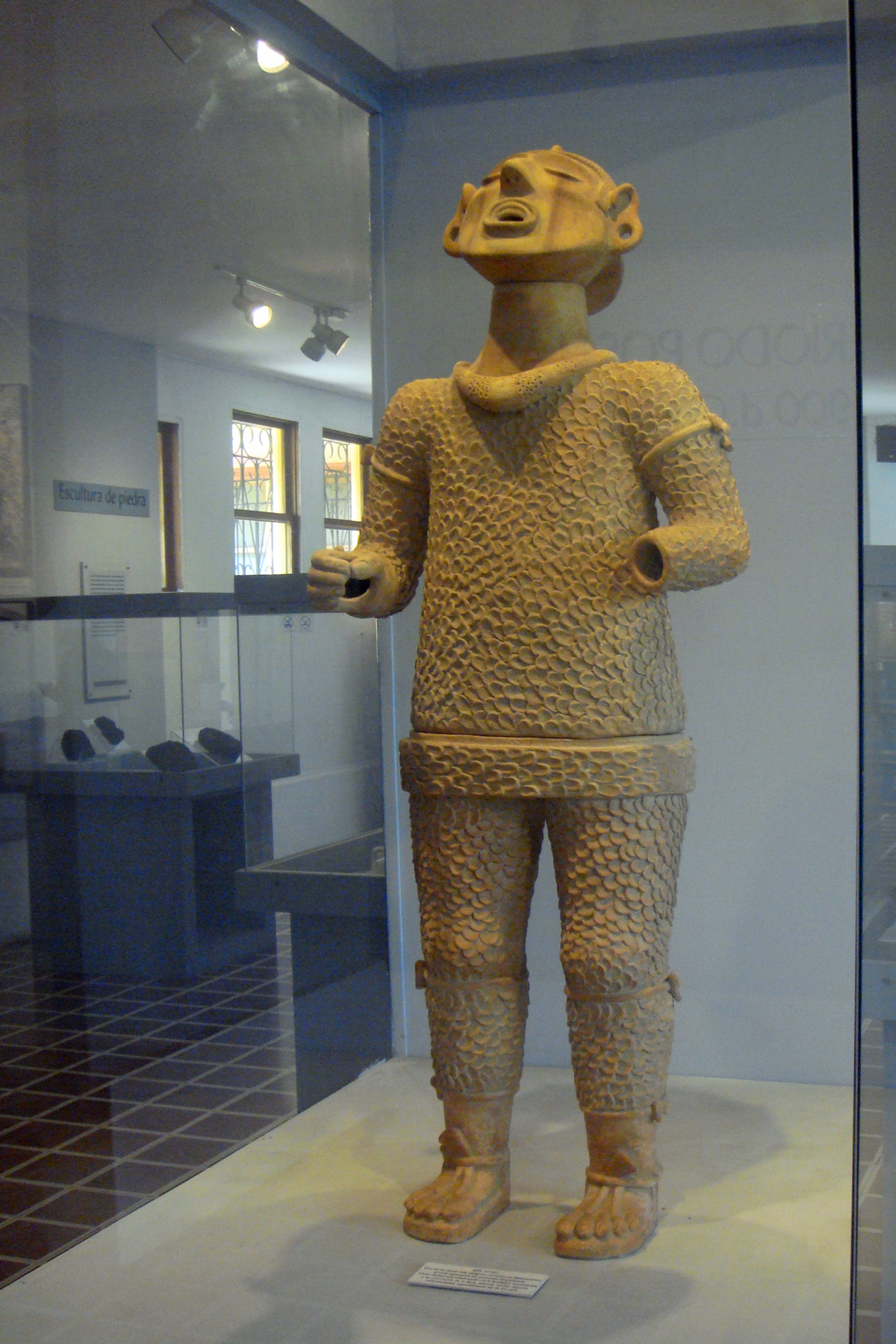
Tazumal's Xipe Totec.

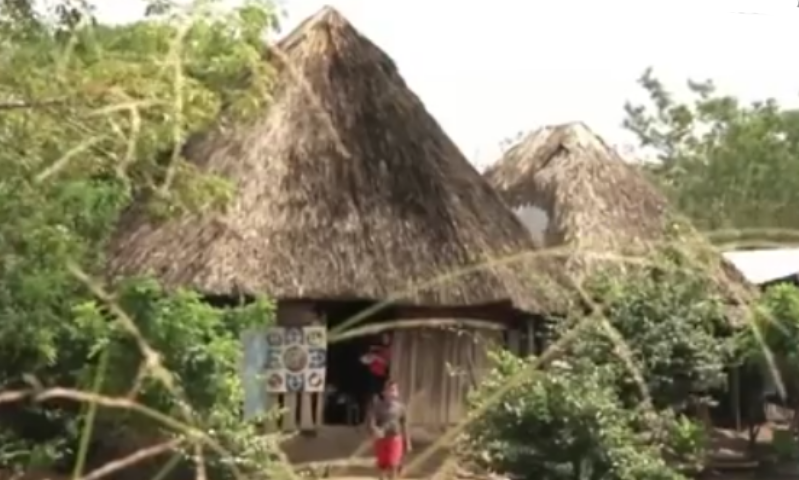
Typical traditional indigenous houses, Ahuachapan

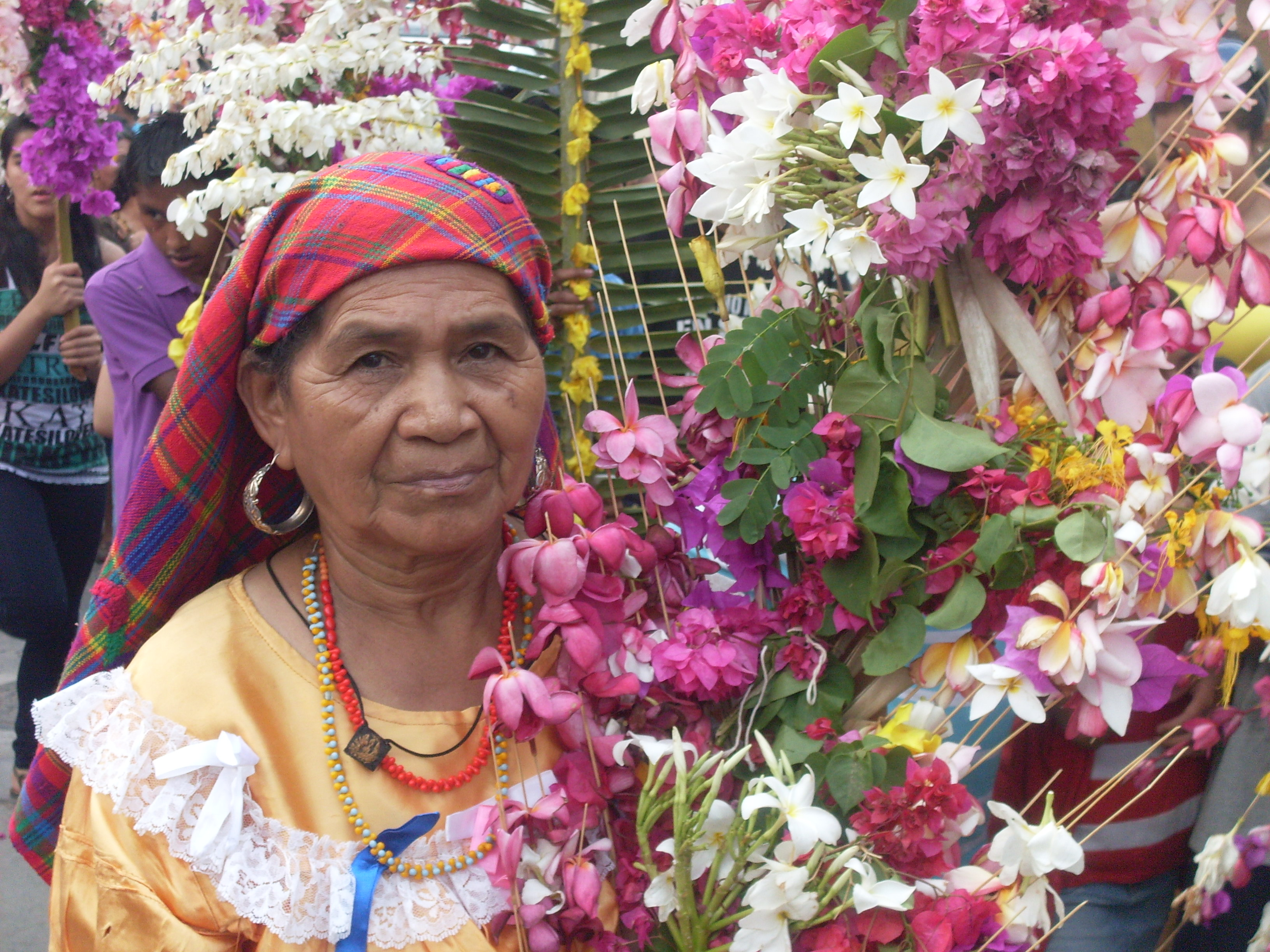
Indigenous Salvadoran woman from Panchimalco.

This was Central America at the time the Native Americans roamed the lush and fertile isthmus. The arrival of the Europeans changed these cultures with colonization, hitting the local population with warfare, oppression and diseases. The indigenous population was powerless to recuperate for centuries.

Map of El Salvador's Indigenous Peoples at the time of the Spanish conquest: 1. Pipil people, 2. Lenca people, 3. Kakawira o Cacaopera, 4. Xinca, 5. Maya Ch'orti' people, 6. Maya Poqomam people, 7. Mangue o Chorotega.

Historically El Salvador has had diverse Native American cultures, coming from the north and south of the continent along with local populations mixed together. El Salvador belongs to the Mesoamerican region, where a myriad of indigenous societies have lived side by side for centuries with their unique cultures and speaking different indigenous languages of the Americas in the beginning of the Classic stage.

Evidence of Olmec civilization presence in western El Salvador can be found in the ruin sites of Chalchuapa in the Ahuachapan Department on boulders in Chalchuapa portraying Omlec warriors with helmets identical to those found on the Olmec colossal heads. This suggest that the area was once an Olmec enclave, before fading away for unknown reasons. The Olmecs are believed to have lived in present-day El Salvador as early as 2000 BC in the beginning of preclassic period. The 'Olmec Boulder, ' is a sculpture of a giant head found near Casa Blanca, El Salvador site in Las Victorias near Chalchuapa. "Olmecoid" figurines, such as the Potbelly sculpture, have been found through this area, in fact most are described as looking primeval proto-Olmeca. In the end of middle preclassic, by 650 BC, this culture would be replaced by the Maya.

The Lenca people are an indigenous people of eastern El Salvador where population today is estimated at 37,000. The Lenca was a matriarchal society and was one of the first civilizations to develop in El Salvador and were the first major civilization in the country. The pre-Conquest Salvadoran Lenca had frequent contact with various Maya groups as well as other indigenous peoples of Central America. The origin of Lenca populations has been a source of ongoing debate amongst anthropologists and historians. Throughout the regions of Lenca occupation, Lenca pottery is a very distinguishable form of Pre-Columbian art. Handcrafted by Lenca women, Lenca pottery is considered an ethnic marking of their culture. Some scholars have suggested that the Lenca migrated to the Central American region from South America around 3,000 years ago, making it the oldest civilization in El Salvador. Guancasco is the annual ceremony by which Lenca communities, usually two, gather to establish reciprocal obligations in order to confirm peace and friendship. Quelepa is a major site in eastern El Salvador. Its pottery shows strong similarities to ceramics found in central western El Salvador and the Maya highlands. The Lenca sites of Yarumela, Los Naranjos in Honduras, and Quelepa in El Salvador, all contain evidence of the Usulután-style ceramics.

The Cacaopera people are an indigenous people in El Salvador who are also known as the Matagalpa or Ulua. Cacaopera people spoke the Cacaopera language, a Misumalpan language. Cacaopera is an extinct language belonging to the Misumalpan family, formerly spoken in the department of Morazán in El Salvador. It was closely related to Matagalpa, and slightly more distantly to Sumo, but was geographically separated from other Misumalpan languages.

The Xinca people, also known as the Xinka, are a non-Mayan indigenous people of Mesoamerica, with communities in the western part of El Salvador near its border. The Xinka may have been among the earliest inhabitants of western El Salvador, predating the arrival of the Maya and the Pipil. The Xinca ethnic group became extinct in the Mestizo process.

El Salvador has two Maya groups, the Poqomam people and the Ch'orti' people. The Poqomam are a Maya people in western El Salvador near its border. Their indigenous language is also called Poqomam. The Ch'orti' people (alternatively, Ch'orti' Maya or Chorti) are one of the indigenous Maya peoples, who primarily reside in communities and towns of northern El Salvador. The Maya once dominated the entire western portion of El Salvador, up until the eruption of the lake ilopango super volcano. Mayan ruins are the most widely conserved in El Salvador and artifacts such as Maya ceramics Mesoamerican writing systems Mesoamerican calendars and Mesoamerican ballgame can be found in all Maya ruins in El Salvador which include Tazumal, San Andrés, El Salvador, Casa Blanca, El Salvador, Cihuatan, and Joya de Cerén.

The Mangue people, also known as Chorotega, are an extinct people indigenous to easternmost El Salvador, near the Gulf of Fonseca.

The Pipils are an indigenous people who live in western El Salvador. Their language is called Nahuat or Pipil and is still spoken today, although it is endangered. The Pipil are considered to be descended from the Toltecs and are relatives of the Aztecs. They were the last indigenous civilization to arrive in El Salvador, arriving from 900 CE onwards. However, in general, their mythology is more closely related to the Maya mythology, who are their near neighbors and by oral tradition they are said to have been adopted by Ch'orti' and Poqomam Mayan people during the Pipil exodus in the 9th century CE. By the time the Spanish arrived, the Pipil were the main indigenous group in western El Salvador and were organized in the polity of Cuzcatlan. They stoutly resisted Spanish efforts to extend their dominion southward.

=== Modern Native American people ===
According to the Salvadoran Government, about 0.23% of the population are of full indigenous origin. The largest most dominant Native American groups in El Salvador are the Lenca people, Cacaopera people, Maya peoples: (Poqomam people/Chorti people) and Pipil people.

The number of indigenous people in El Salvador have been criticized by indigenous organizations and academics as too small and accuse the government of denying the existence of indigenous Salvadorans in the country. According to the National Salvadoran Indigenous Coordination Council (CCNIS) and CONCULTURA (National Council for Art and Culture at the Ministry of Education), approximately 600,000 or 10 per cent of Salvadorian peoples are indigenous. Nonetheless, very few natives have retained their customs and traditions, having over time assimilated into the dominant Mestizo/Spanish culture. The low numbers of indigenous people may be partly explained by historically high rates of old-world diseases, absorption into the mestizo population, as well as mass murder during the 1932 Salvadoran peasant uprising (or La Matanza) which saw (estimates of) up to 30,000 peasants killed in a short period of time. The 1932 Salvadoran peasant massacre occurred on January 22 of that year, in the western departments of El Salvador when a brief peasant-led rebellion was suppressed by the government, then led by Maximiliano Hernández Martínez. The Salvadoran army, being vastly superior in terms of weapons and soldiers, executed those who stood against it. The rebellion was a mixture of protest and insurrection and ended in ethnocide, claiming the lives of anywhere between 10,000 and 40,000 peasants and other civilians, many of them indigenous people. Many authors note that since La Matanza the indigenous in El Salvador have been very reluctant to describe themselves as such (in census declarations for example) or to wear indigenous dress or be seen to be taking part in any cultural activities or customs that might be understood as indigenous. Departments and cities in the country with notable indigenous populations include Sonsonate (especially Izalco, Nahuizalco, and Santo Domingo), Cacaopera, and Panchimalco, in the department of San Salvador

== Arab Heritage ==
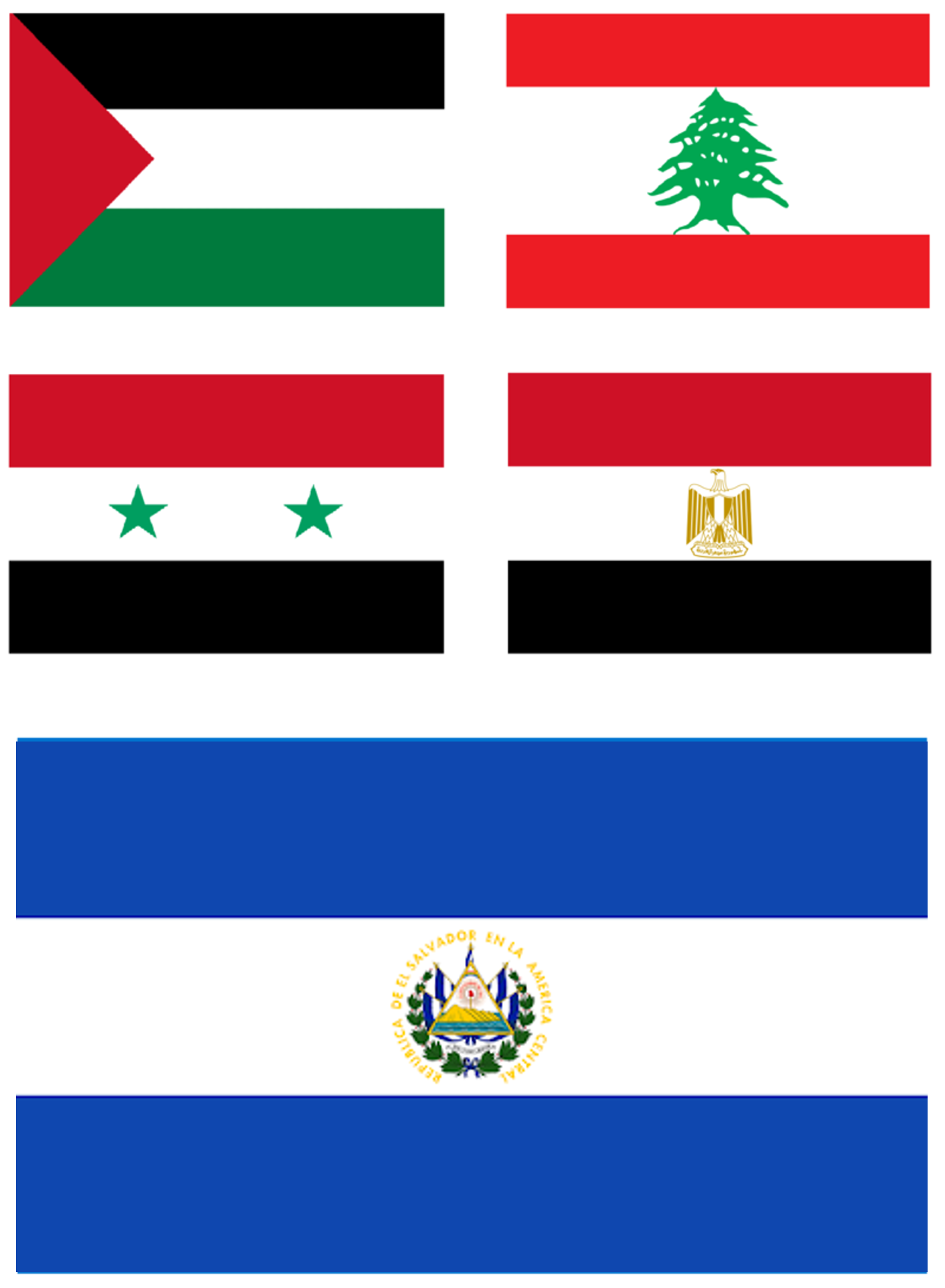
Arab Salvadorans include Palestinian Salvadoran, Lebanese Salvadoran, Syrian Salvadoran and Egyptian Salvadoran.

There is a significant Arab population (of about 100,000); mostly from Palestine (especially from the area of Bethlehem), but also from Lebanon. Salvadorans of Palestinian descent numbered around 70,000 individuals, while Salvadorans of Lebanese descent is around 25,000. There is also a small community of Jews who came to El Salvador from France, Germany, Morocco, Tunisia, and Turkey.

The history of the Arabs in El Salvador dates back to the end of the 19th century, because of religious clashes, which induced many Palestinians, Lebanese, Egyptians and Syrians to leave the land where they were born, in search of countries where they at least lived in an atmosphere of relative peace. There were also other reasons of a subjective nature, based on the hope of success, of achieving success and fortune and obtaining recognition from others.

It was not until the period between 1880s and 1920s, that the Arab migration began, when more than 121,000 people began to arrive in El Salvador, which at the time in 1879, El Salvador had a small local population of 482,400 and by 1920 El Salvador's population had grown to 1,168,000. These Arabs settled in the cities of San Salvador, San Miguel, Santa Ana, Santa Tecla, Usulutan and La Union.

Arab immigration in El Salvador began at the end of the 19th century in the wake of the repressive policies applied by the Ottoman Empire against Maronite Catholics. Several of the destinations that the Lebanese chose at that time were in countries of the Americas, including El Salvador. This resulted in the Arab diaspora residents being characterized by forging in devoutly Christian families and very attached to their beliefs, because in these countries they can exercise their faith without fear of persecution, which resulted in the rise of Lebanese-Salvadoran, Syrian-Salvadoran and Palestinian-Salvadoran communities in El Salvador.

Currently the strongest community is the Palestinian (70,000 descendants), followed by the Lebanese settled in San Salvador with more than 27,000 direct descendants, mostly (95%) Catholic and Orthodox Christians. The slaughter of Lebanese and Palestinian Arab Christians at the hands of Muslims, initiated the first Lebanese migration to El Salvador.

Inter-ethnic marriage in the Lebanese community with Salvadorans, regardless of religious affiliation, is very high; most have only one father with Lebanese nationality and mother of Salvadoran nationality. As a result, some of them speak Arabic fluently. But most, especially among younger generations, speak Spanish as a first language and Arabic as a second.

During the war between Israel and Lebanon in 1948 and during the Six Day War, thousands of Lebanese left their country and went to El Salvador. First they arrived at La Libertad, were they comprised half of the economic activity of immigrants.

Lebanon had been an iqta of the Ottoman Empire. Although the imperial administration, whose official religion was Islam, guaranteed freedom of worship for non-Muslim communities, and Lebanon in particular had a semi-autonomous status, the situation for practitioners of the Maronite Catholic Church was complicated, since they had to cancel exaggerated taxes and suffered limitations for their culture. These tensions were expressed in a rebellion in 1821 and a war against the Druze in 1860. The hostile climate caused many Lebanese to sell their property and take ships in the ports of Sidon, Beirut and Tripoli heading for the Americas.

Statistically in El Salvador, there are about 120,000 Arabs, of Lebanese, Syrian, Egyptian and Palestinian ancestry. In the case of these Arab-Salvadorans, although not all the families arrived together, they were the ones that lead the economy in the country.

In 1939, the Arab community based in San Salvador organized and founded the "Arab Youth Union Society"

== The Salvadoran Cabalgador (Cowboy) ==
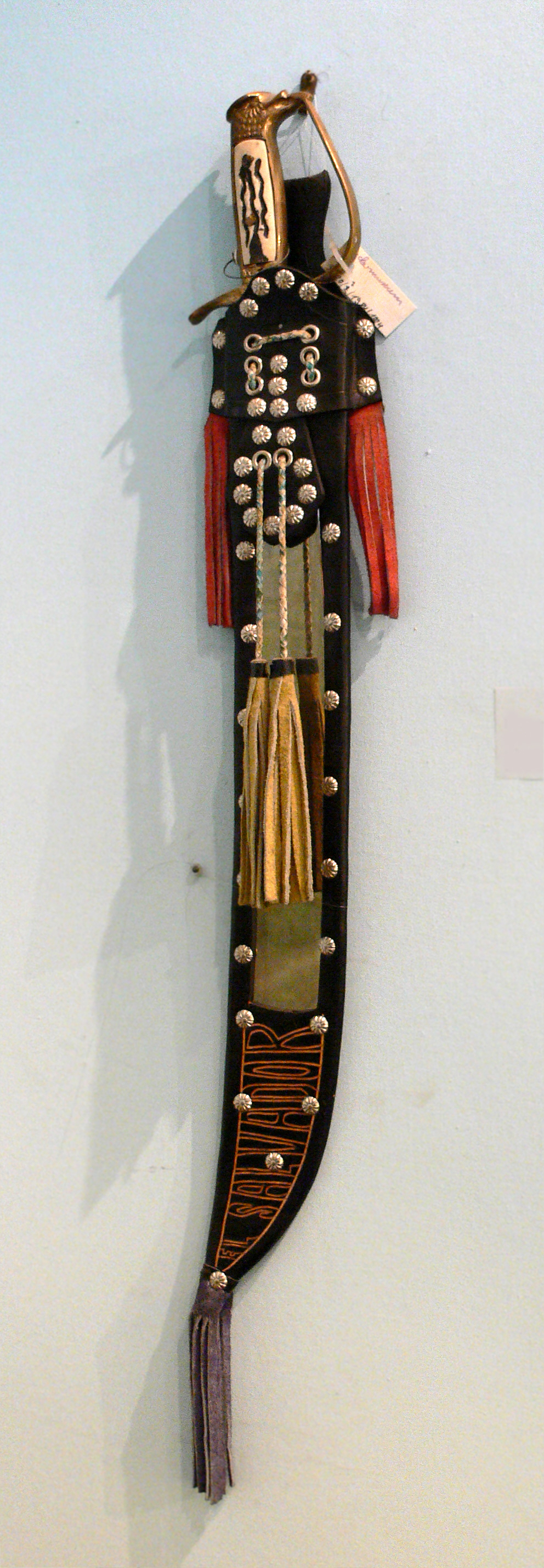
Typical Salvadoran machete

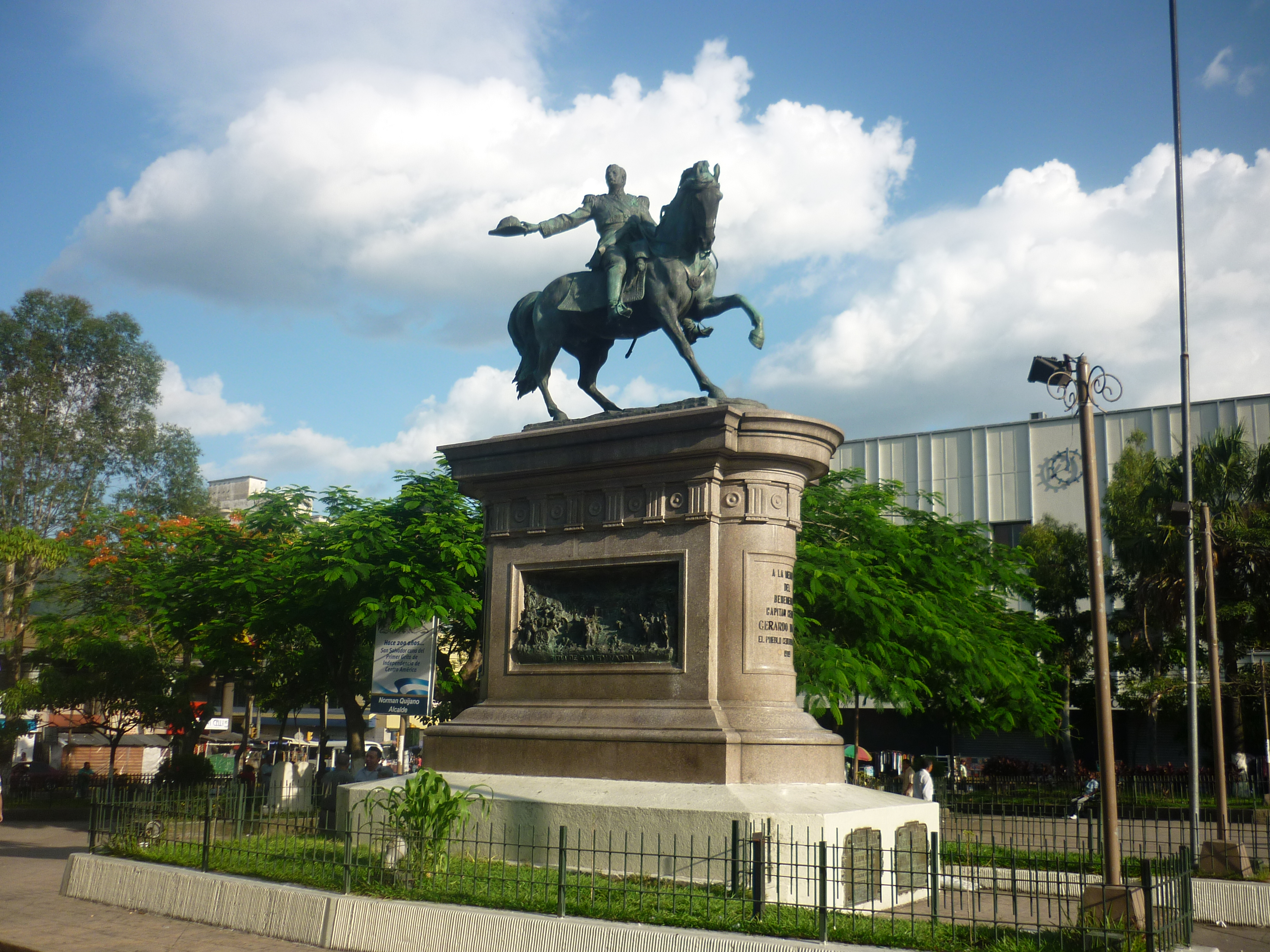
The Salvadoran president and military cavalryman Gerardo Barrios depicted as a Cabalgador. He was a liberal and supported the unity of Central America. From a young age he was part of the army of the last president of the Federation of Central American Estates, Francisco Morazán.

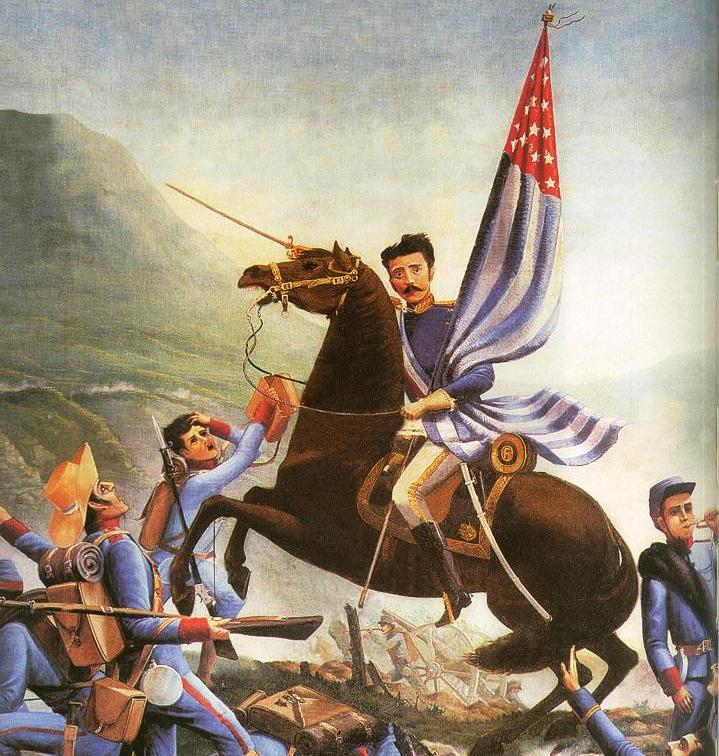
President of El Salvador General Tomás Regalado Romero, on a horse holding an older version of El Salvador flag.

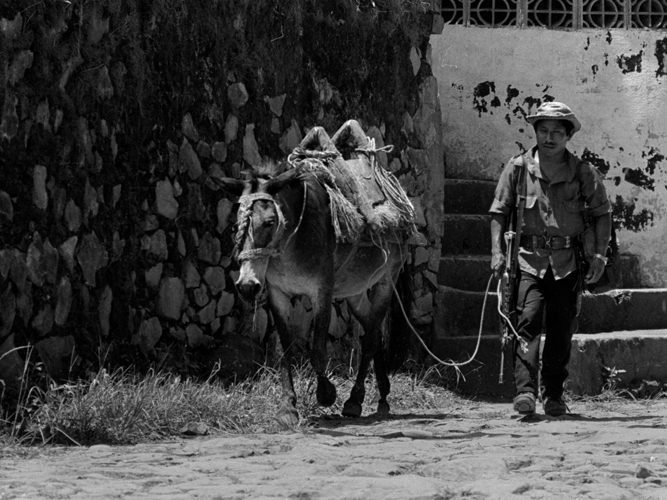
A Salvadoran guerrilla in Perquin 1990

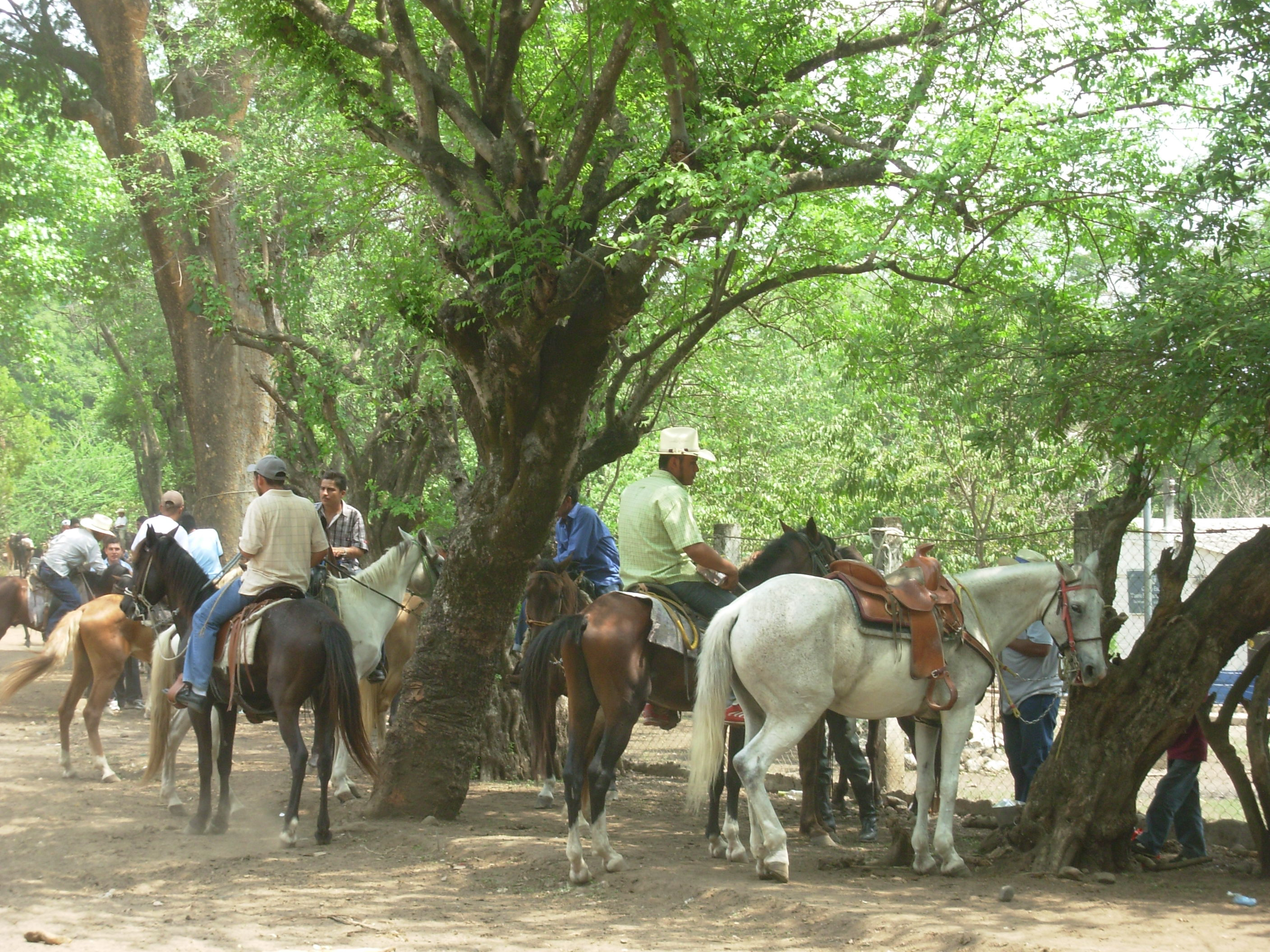
Salvadoran riders in Quezaltepeque, La Libertad

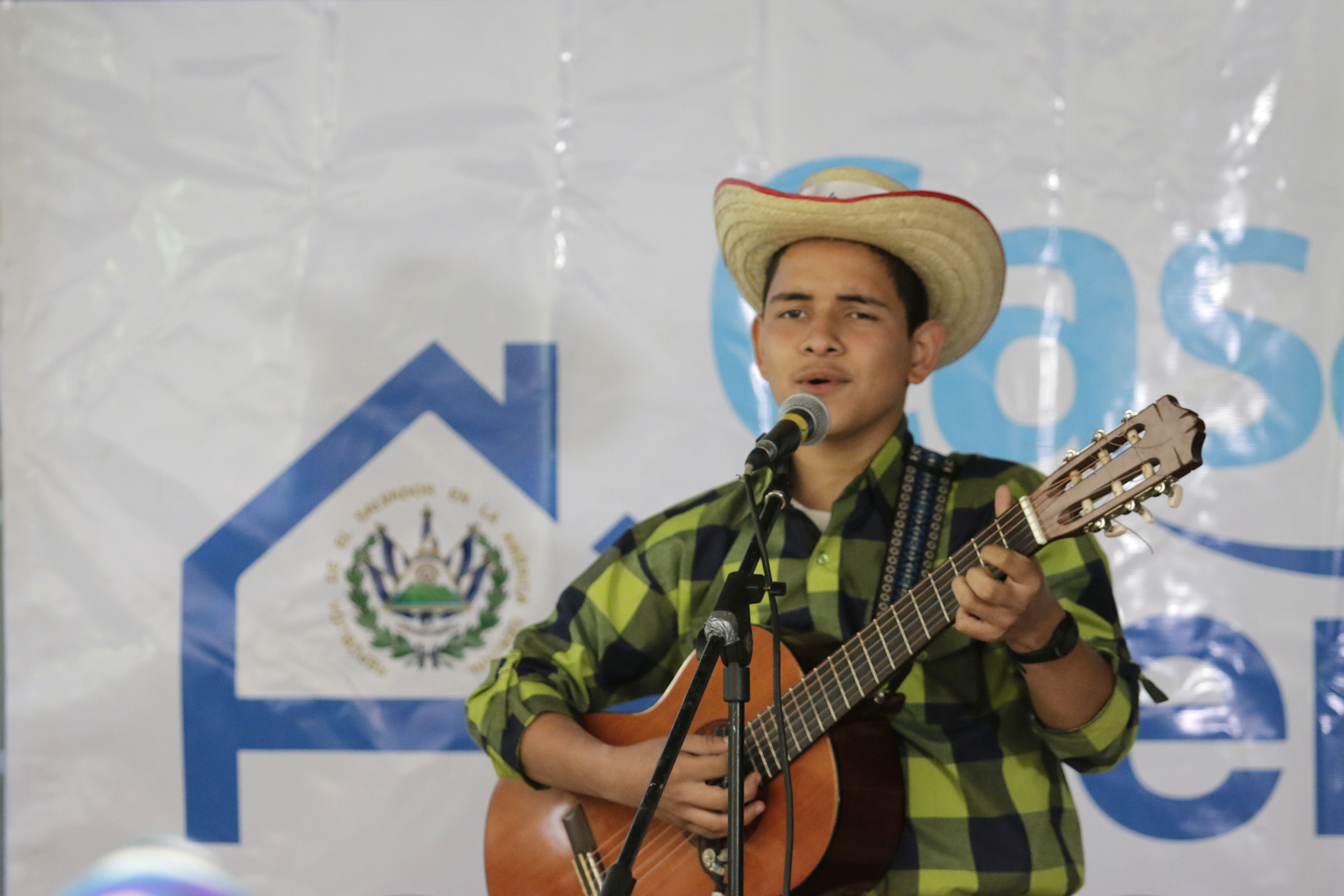
Salvadoran young man from the country side

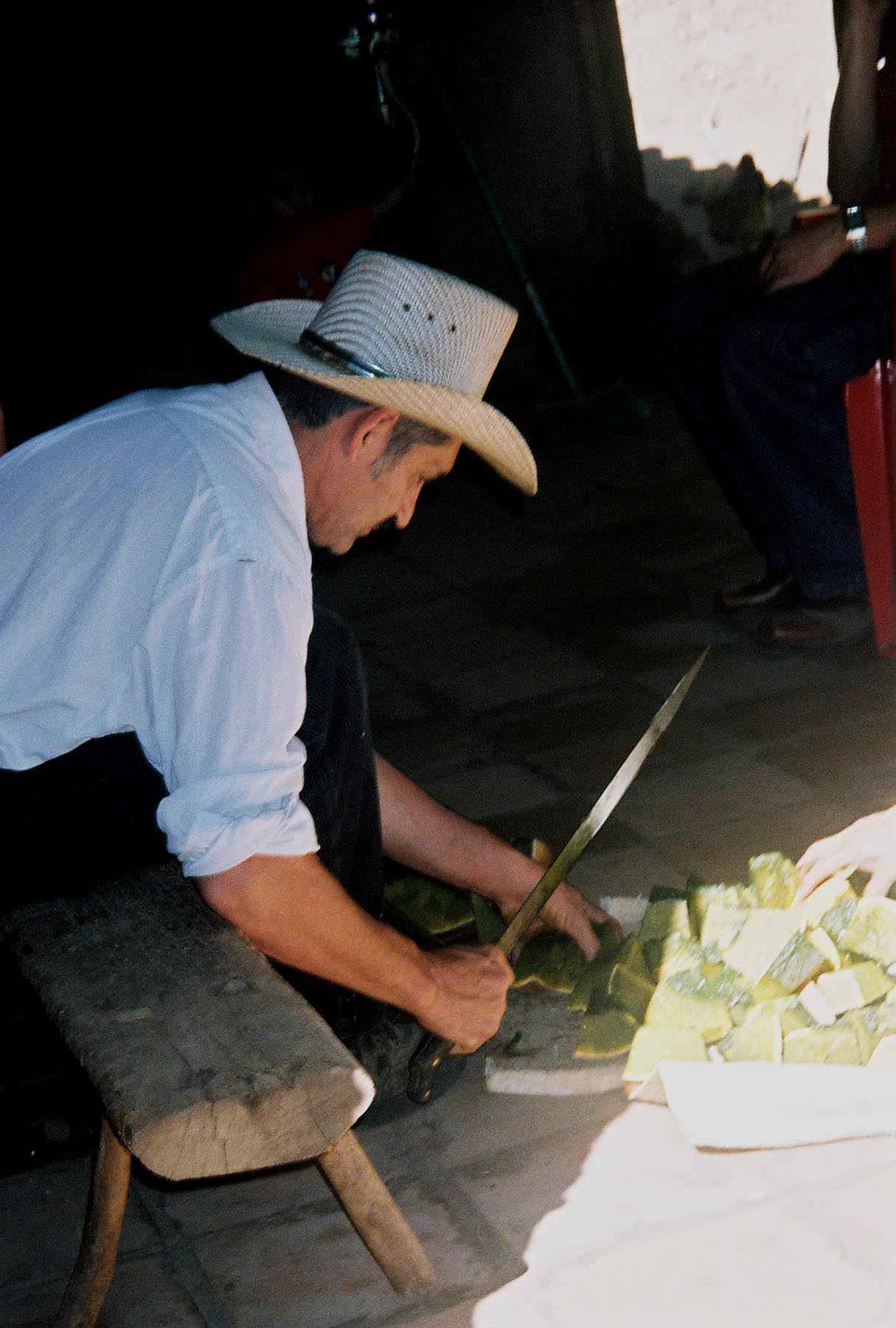
Salvdoran man with machete

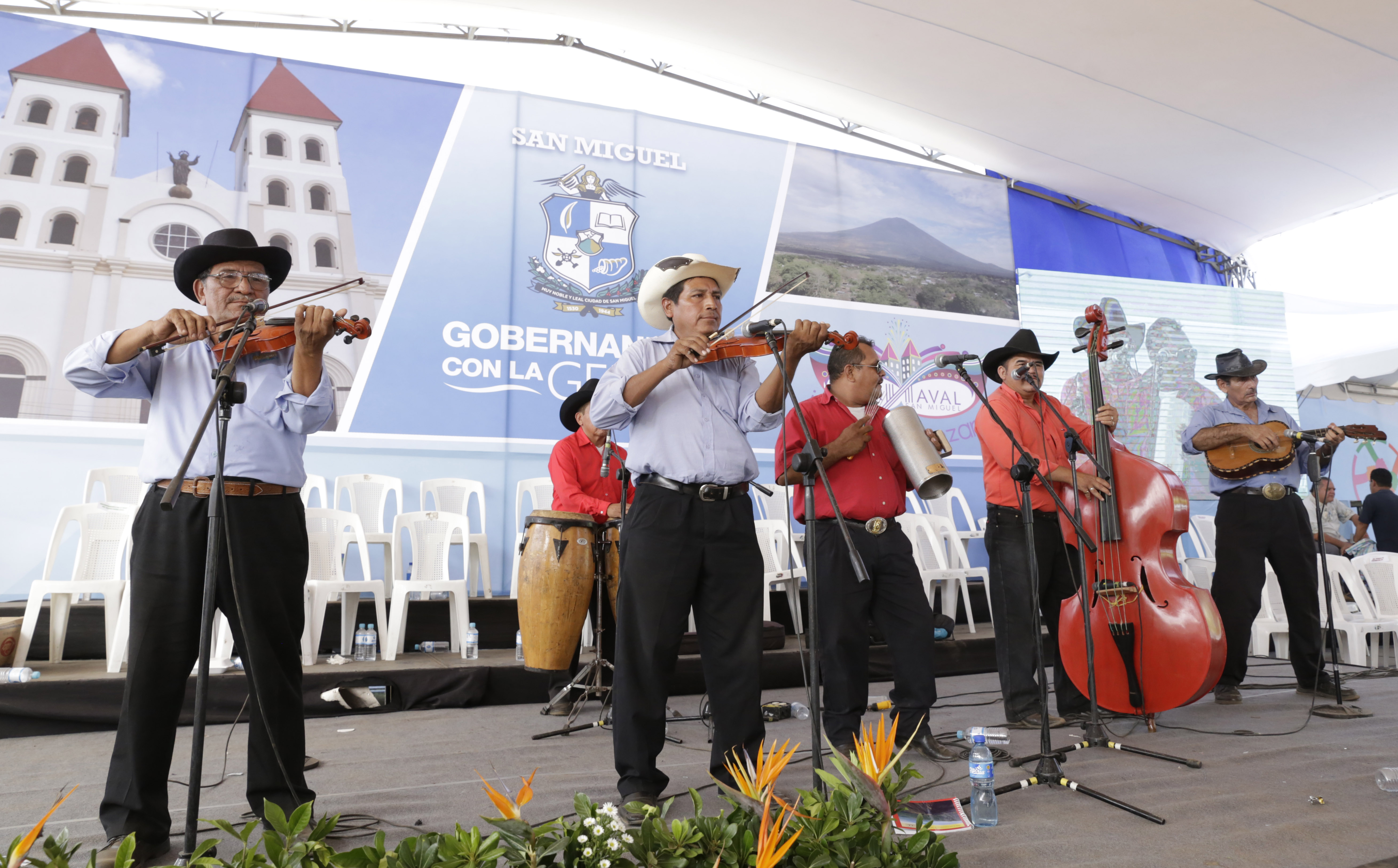
Salvadoran country side musicians with traditional cowboy clothing

A Cabalgador (Spanish: Cavalry, Horseman, Horserider) is a Salvadoran horse-mounted livestock herder (cowboy) of a tradition that originated on the Iberian Peninsula and was brought to Central America by Spanish settlers. It has deep historic roots tracing back to Spain and the earliest European settlers of the Americas. Cabalgador is a Spanish word for a horseman rider and herder. It derives from Cabalgar and Cabalgadura meaning "rider". Early Cabalgadores in El Salvador were originally a mixture of part Spanish and American Indigenous, Mestizo, Indigenous and Pardo men who lived in the countryside and had a strong culture which has shaped El Salvador's over all distinctive rural culture, tradition, folklore, and music, having a strong rural countryside culture. The origins of the Cabagador tradition in El Salvador come from Spain, beginning with the hacienda system of medieval Spain. This style of cattle ranching spread throughout much of the Iberian peninsula and later, was imported to the Americas. During the 16th century, the Conquistadors and other Spanish settlers brought their cattle-raising traditions as well as both horses and domesticated cattle to the Americas.

The traditions of Spain were transformed by the geographic, environmental and cultural circumstances. In turn, the land and people of the Americas also saw dramatic changes due to Spanish influence. In El Salvador's case, a massive, almost complete deforestation to make way for agriculture and animal herding, El Salvador lost virtually all of its primary rain forests. The Spanish haciendas which in El Salvador's case were owned by a military middle class and wealthy military cavalry Spaniards who spoke in voseo, a Spanish speech that originates from medieval Spain, this way of speech is used by all Salvadorans today, Salvadoran Spanish which has shaped and defined Salvadorian-ism dating back to the 16th and 17th centuries.

Among common horse riders, there were also military and police Cavalry troopers called (Guardias) National Guard (El Salvador) who were infamously feared due to their abuse and unlimited use of power over the population, patrolling the rural areas keeping order. The Cabalgadores would prove to be vital up until the mid 20th century, especially for the military and the campesinos who would be influenced by the revolution, most of the guerrillas in El Salvador's civil war, were poor citizens who rode horses in the rural mountains.

Today being a Cabalgador is a symbol and idealized representative of machismo, virility and a display of either chauvinism but also with vestiges of chivalrous attitudes. They also are seen as poor campesinos (peasants), and are seen as people without manners or lacking the sophistication of an urbanite, akin to a redneck. However, being a campesino is also used in a neutral or positive context or self-descriptively with pride because it describes a humble and hard-working person. Cabalgadores in El Salvador dress in cowboy hats and carry machetes also known as Corbos in El Salvador, and they listen to nueva canción guitar type music.

== See also ==
- Catholic Church in El Salvador
- Central America
- Demographics of El Salvador
- Geography of El Salvador
- Monumento al Divino Salvador del Mundo
- Music of El Salvador
- Palestinian Salvadoran
- Religion in El Salvador
- Salvadorans
- Salvadoran Americans
- Salvadoran cuisine
- Salvadoran Spanish
- San Salvador
- Salvadoran literature
- List of museums in El Salvador
- Public holidays in El Salvador
