= Central Ahuachapán =

Municipality in Ahuachapán Department, El Salvador

Central Ahuachapán Ahuachapán Centro (Spanish)
- Municipality
- Location of Central Ahuachapán in El Salvador
- Coordinates: 13°55′17″N 89°50′42″W
- Country: El Salvador
- Department: Ahuachapán Department
- Established: 1 May 2024
- Municipal seat: Ahuachapán
- Districts: 4 districts

Area
  - Total: 453.1 km^{2} (174.9 sq mi)

Population (2024)
  - Total: 155,442
  - Density: 343.1/km^{2} (888.5/sq mi)
- Time zone: UTC−6 (CST)
- Postal code: 02101
- Area code: +503

Central Ahuachapán (Spanish: Ahuachapán Centro) is a municipality in the central region of Ahuachapán Department, El Salvador. Created during El Salvador's 2023–2024 municipal restructuring, it consolidates four former municipalities into a single administrative jurisdiction containing the departmental capital of Ahuachapán and key segments of the Ruta de las Flores.

== History ==
In June 2023, the Legislative Assembly of El Salvador approved the Special Law for Municipal Restructuring (Ley Especial para la Reestructuración Municipal), reducing the nation's 262 municipalities to 44. Under this law, which entered into force on 1 May 2024, four existing municipalities in central Ahuachapán Department—Ahuachapán, Apaneca, Concepción de Ataco, and Tacuba—were merged to form the municipality of Central Ahuachapán, with their former municipal territories reclassified as administrative districts.

== Geography ==
Central Ahuachapán spans an area of 453.1 km^{2} (174.9 sq mi) across the central volcanic highlands and western borderlands of Ahuachapán Department. The terrain rises from the Paz River valley along the Guatemalan border in the west into the Apaneca-Ilamatepec volcanic mountain range in the south and east, reaching elevations exceeding 1,800 m (5,900 ft) near Apaneca.

It is bordered to the north by Guatemala (Jutiapa Department) and Northern Ahuachapán, to the east by Western Santa Ana (Chalchuapa) and Northern Sonsonate (Juayúa and Salcoatitán), to the south by Southern Ahuachapán (Jujutla, Guaymango, and San Pedro Puxtla), and to the west by Guatemala.

== Administrative divisions ==
Central Ahuachapán is divided into four administrative districts:

| District | Population (2024) | Notes |
|---|---|---|
| Ahuachapán | 119,215 | Departmental capital, most populous district, and municipal seat |
| Apaneca | 8,540 | Highland coffee-producing town along the Ruta de las Flores |
| Concepción de Ataco | 12,810 | Highland tourism and artisan hub along the Ruta de las Flores |
| Tacuba | 14,877 | Gateway to El Imposible National Park in the western highlands |

== Economy and tourism ==
The municipality's economy is anchored by commerce, high-altitude coffee production, geothermal energy, and cultural and ecological tourism:

- Tourism (Ruta de las Flores): Apaneca and Concepción de Ataco are major stops along the Ruta de las Flores, known for colonial architecture, murals, coffee estates, and mountain eco-tourism. Tacuba serves as the northern access point to El Imposible National Park.
- Geothermal energy and agriculture: Ahuachapán is home to one of Central America's largest geothermal power plants (Central Geotérmica de Ahuachapán), utilizing volcanic thermal fields (ausoles). High-altitude specialty coffee is cultivated extensively across Apaneca, Concepción de Ataco, and Tacuba.
- Cross-border commerce: The district of Ahuachapán serves as the primary commercial and service center for western El Salvador and connects to Guatemala via the Las Chinamas international border crossing.

== See also ==
- Municipalities of El Salvador
- Departments of El Salvador
- Ahuachapán Department
- Northern Ahuachapán
