= Northern Ahuachapán =

Municipality in Ahuachapán Department, El Salvador

Northern Ahuachapán Ahuachapán Norte (Spanish)
- Municipality
- Location of Northern Ahuachapán in El Salvador
- Coordinates: 13°58′37″N 89°45′09″W
- Country: El Salvador
- Department: Ahuachapán Department
- Established: 1 May 2024
- Municipal seat: Atiquizaya
- Districts: 4 districts

Area
  - Total: 141.6 km^{2} (54.7 sq mi)

Population (2024)
  - Total: 61,605
  - Density: 435.1/km^{2} (1,127/sq mi)
- Time zone: UTC−6 (CST)
- Postal code: 02101
- Area code: +503

Northern Ahuachapán (Spanish: Ahuachapán Norte) is a municipality in the northern region of Ahuachapán Department, El Salvador. Created during El Salvador's 2023–2024 municipal restructuring, it consolidates four former municipalities into a single administrative jurisdiction along the Guatemalan border and the Pan-American Highway.

== History ==
In June 2023, the Legislative Assembly of El Salvador approved the Special Law for Municipal Restructuring (Ley Especial para la Reestructuración Municipal), reducing the nation's 262 municipalities to 44. Under this law, which took effect on 1 May 2024, four existing municipalities in northern Ahuachapán Department—Atiquizaya, El Refugio, San Lorenzo, and Turín—were merged to form the municipality of Northern Ahuachapán, with their former municipal territories becoming administrative districts.

== Geography ==
Northern Ahuachapán spans an area of 141.6 km^{2} (54.7 sq mi) in the northern plains and foothills of Ahuachapán Department. Its northern boundary follows the Paz River (Río Paz), which forms the international border between El Salvador and Guatemala (Jutiapa Department).

It is bordered to the north by Guatemala, to the east by Western Santa Ana (Chalchuapa and El Porvenir), to the south by Central Ahuachapán (Ahuachapán and Apaneca).

== Administrative divisions ==
Northern Ahuachapán is divided into four administrative districts:

| District | Population (2024) | Notes |
|---|---|---|
| Atiquizaya | 35,342 | Most populous district, commercial center, and municipal seat |
| El Refugio | 10,854 | Located along the Pan-American Highway near the Santa Ana departmental border |
| San Lorenzo | 8,912 | Northern agricultural district bordering the Paz River and Guatemala |
| Turín | 6,497 | Commercial and agricultural district along the Pan-American Highway |

== Economy and infrastructure ==
The municipality's economy is driven by commercial trade, agriculture, agro-industry, and cross-border transit:

- Agriculture: Cultivation of coffee in the southern foothills, alongside sugarcane, basic grains (maize and beans), vegetables, and cattle ranching in the northern plains near the Paz River.
- Transportation and trade: The Pan-American Highway (CA-1) passes directly through El Refugio, Turín, and Atiquizaya, linking the municipality with Santa Ana to the east and the Las Chinamas border crossing into Guatemala to the west.
- Tourism: Atiquizaya is noted for its natural freshwater springs and ecological sites, including the Salto de Malacatiupán thermal waterfalls.

== See also ==
- Municipalities of El Salvador
- Departments of El Salvador
- Ahuachapán Department
