= Wendy Caishpal =

Salvadoran disabled rights activist

- Born: Wendy Beatriz Caishpal Jaco; 1990 (age 35–36); Ahuachapán, El Salvador
- Occupations: Attorney; Human rights activist
- Organization: https://www.facebook.com/AhuachapanSinBarrerasOficial/

Wendy Beatriz Caishpal Jaco is a Salvadoran entrepreneur, motivational speaker, and human rights activist for people with disabilities and armed conflict survivors.

== Early life ==
Caishpal was born and raised in Ahuachapán. At the age of 14, she was in a car with her cousin selling bread. As she exited the vehicle to make a sale to a woman, a group of gang members ran up and shot her cousin in the head, killing him. She was shot five times in the leg, back, and arm. After she was taken to the hospital, she remained in a coma for fourteen days. She awoke to learn that she had a spinal cord injury and was permanently paralyzed from the waist down. As a result of the incident, Caishpal started using a wheelchair.

She has said that it was a long rehabilitation process, and at first, she refused to believe that she would never walk again. She had been very sporty; she grew up skating and ran often. It took several years for her to arrive at the point she is at now. The disability organization Red de Sobrevivientes gave her opportunities for rehabilitation and personal development, as well as educating her on her rights as a disabled person. According to Wendy, "It has strengthened me and helped me accept my situation. Now I love my wheelchair!"

== Education ==
She initially studied international relations at the University of El Salvador, but a lack of facilities for disabled students forced her to drop out; she subsequently trained as an attorney.

== Advocacy ==
Caishpal served as El Salvador's representative at the Women's Institute on Leadership and Disability, organised by International Mobility USA.

Caishpal is the founder and director of Ahuachapán Sin Barreras (Ahuachapán Without Barriers), a municipal project that promotes and protects the rights of people in Ahuachapán. This included taking an active role in the design and planning of two local parks to ensure they were accessible to the disabled, and planning swimming pool events with disabled children in mind. Caishpal also provides free legal advice through Ahuachapán Sin Barreras to educate disabled people about their rights, particularly with regards to their health. In her eyes, Ahuachapán Sin Barreras isn't just about physical barriers. She wants the disabled population to overcome the architectural, environmental and attitudinal barriers they face as well.

== Recognition ==
In 2020, Caishpal was named as one of the BBC's 100 Inspiring and Influential Women, among 11 Latina women recognised.

Also in 2020, Caishpal was recognised by the Ahuachapán Department as part of the International Day for the Elimination of Violence Against Women for her work in defending the rights of women.

== Personal life ==
Caishpal is a single mother of two children. She is currently employed as a lawyer.
