= List of flags with Spanish-language text =

This is a list of flags inscribed with Spanish-language text.

Flag	Dates used	Spanish text	English translation
Ahuachapán Department	1962–present	1. AHUACHAPAN; 2. FEBRERO 22; 3. PRIMER CENTENARIO; 4. 1862; 5. 1962; 6. CIUDAD DE LOS AUSOLES	1. AHUACHAPAN; 2. FEBRUARY 22; 3. FIRST CENTENARY; 4. 1862; 5. 1962; 6. CITY OF LOS AUSOLES
Alajuela Province	–present	ALAJUELA	ALAJUELA
Álava	–present	1. CONTRA MALHECHORES EN AUMENTO DE LA JUSTICIA; 2. JUSTICIA	1. AGAINST WRONGDOERS IN INCREASED JUSTICE; 2. JUSTICE
Alicante	–present	1. A L; [abbreviation of "Akra Leuke"]: 2. L A; [abbreviation of "Lucentum Alacant"]	1. A L; [abbreviation of "Akra Leuke"]: 2. L A; [abbreviation of "Lucentum Alacant"]
Alta Verapaz Department	–present	YO PONDRÉ MI ARCO	I WILL PLACE MY BOW
Alto Hospicio	–present	MUNICIPALIDAD ALTO HOSPICIO	ALTO HOSPICIO MUNICIPALITY
Alto Paraguay Department	–present	FUERZA VIDA PROSPERIDAD	STRENGTH LIFE PROSPERITY
Amambay Department	–present	1. XIII DEPARTAMENTO DE AMAMBAY; 2. REPUBLICA DEL PARAGUAY	1. XIII DEPARTMENT OF AMAMBAY; 2. REPUBLIC OF PARAGUAY
Andalusia	1918–present	ANDALVCÍA POR SÍ, PARA ESPAÑA Y LA HVMANIDAD	ANDALUCIA FOR HERSELF FOR SPAIN AND FOR HUMANKIND
Ancud	–present	1. ALTIVA FUERTE Y LEAL; 2. ANCUD	1. LORDLY STRONG AND LOYAL; 2. ANCUD
Antofagasta Region	–present	1. INTENDENCIA II REGIÓN; 2. ANTOFAGASTA; 3. POR LA RAZÓN O LA FUERZA	1. ADMINISTRATION II REGION; 2. ANTOFAGASTA; 3. BY RIGHT OR MIGHT
Aragua	–present	1. ARAGUA; 2. FEBRERO de 1814; 3. MARZO DE 1874	1. ARAGUA; 2. FEBRUARY 1814; 3. MARCH 1874
Arequipa Region and Arequipa	–present	KARLOS	Charles
Arica	–present	1. Mayor es mi lealtad 2. San Marcos de Arica	1. Greater is my loyalty 2. San Marcos de Arica
Arica y Parinacota Region	–present	ARICA Y PARINACOTA GOBIERNO REGIONAL	ARICA Y PARINACOTA REGIONAL GOVERNMENT
Ávila Province	–present	ÁVILA DEL REY	ÁVILA KING
Badajoz	–present	Muy Noble y Muy Leal Ciudad	Most Noble and Loyal City
Baja California	–present	TRABAJO Y JUSTICIA SOCIAL	WORK AND SOCIAL JUSTICE
Biobío Region	–present	REGIÓN DEL BIO~BIO	BIO~BIO REGION
Bocas del Toro Province	–present	B [abbreviation of "Bocas del Toro"]	B [abbreviation of "Bocas del Toro"]
Bolívar State	–present	1. 5 DE JULIO DE 1811; 2. 15 de FEBRERO de 1819; 3. 16 de DICIEMBRE de 1863	1. 5 JULY 1811; 2. 15 FEBRUARY 1819; 3. 16 DECEMBER 1863
Bolivia	1851–present	BOLIVIA	BOLIVIA
Bolivia (state flag)	1826–51	BOLIVIA	BOLIVIA
Cádiz Province	–present	1. 1820 UNIÓN Y FUERZA 1810; 2. DE MI SALE LA PAZ	1. 1820 UNION AND STRENGTH 1810; 2. MY PEACE EMANATES
Cajamarca Province and Cajamarca	–present	C L [abbreviation of "Carlos" and "Luisa"]	C L [abbreviation of "Charles" and "Luisa"]
Canary Islands	1961–present	OCEANO	OCEAN
Caracas	–present	1. Santiago de León de Caracas 1567; 2. AVE MARIA SANTISIMA SIN PECADO CONCEBIDA EN EL PRIMER INSTANTE DE SU SER NATURAL	1. Santiago de León de Caracas 1567; 2. BLESSED MOST HOLY MARY CONCEIVED WITHOUT GUILT IN THE FIRST INSTANT OF HER NATURAL BEING
United Provinces of Central America	1823–24	PROVINCIAS UNIDAS DEL CENTRO DE AMERICA	UNITED PROVINCES OF THE CENTRE OF AMERICA
Federal Republic of Central America	1824–38	REPUBLICA FEDERAL DE CENTRO AMERICA	FEDERAL REPUBLIC OF CENTRAL AMERICA
Cerro Largo Department	–present	1. CERRO LARGO; 2. 1795	1. CERRO LARGO; 2. 1795
Chalatenango Department	–present	CHALATENANGO	CHALATENANGO
Chihuahua	–present	1. ESTADº D CH^{IH}; 2. VALENTIA LEALTAD HºSPITALIDAD	1. STATE OF CH^{IH}; 2. BRAVERY LOYALTY HºSPITALITY
Chile (President)	–present	POR LA RAZÓN O LA FUERZA	BY RIGHT OR MIGHT
Chillán Viejo	–present	CHILLÁN VIEJO	CHILLÁN VIEJO
Chimaltenango Department	–present	DEPARTAMENTO DE CHIMALTENANGO	DEPARTMENT OF CHIMALTENANGO
Chimborazo Province	–present	PROVINCIA DE CHIMBORAZO	PROVINCE OF CHIMBORAZO
Chimbote	–present	CHIMBOTE	CHIMBOTE
Chiquimula Department	–present	1. 29 DE JULIO 1876; 2. 25 SEPT DE 1612	1. 29 JULY 1876; 2. 25 SEPT 1612
Chocontá	–present	1. LEAL Y NOBLE VILLA DE SANTIAGO DE CHOCONTÁ; 2. N R; [abbreviation of "Nuevo Reino"]	1. LOYAL AND NOBLE TOWN OF SANTIAGO DE CHOCONTÁ; 2. N K; [abbreviation of "New Kingdom"]
Ciudad Real Province	–present	1. M; [abbreviation of "Manzanares"]: 2. MUY HEROICA CIUDAD DE VALDEPEÑAS	1. M; [abbreviation of "Manzanares"]: 2. MOST HEROIC CITY OF VALDEPEÑAS
Coahuila	–present	COAHVILA DE ZARAGOZA	COAHUILA DE ZARAGOZA
Cochrane, Chile	–present	COCHRANE	COCHRANE
Coclé Province	–present	COCLÉ	COCLÉ
Colima	–present	EL TEMPLE DEL BRAZO ES VIGOR EN LA TIERRA	THE SPIRIT OF THE ARM IS FORCE ON EARTH
Coquimbo	–present	COQUIMBO	COQUIMBO
Corral, Chile	–present	ILUSTRE MUNICIPALIDAD DE C⨁RRAL	ILLUSTRIOUS MUNICIPALITY OF C⨁RRAL
Corrientes Province	–present	PATRIA – LIBERTAD – CONSTITUCION	HOMELAND – LIBERTY – CONSTITUTION
Costa Rica	1824–40	1. PROVINCIAS UNIDAS DEL CENTRO DE AMERICA; 2. ESTADO LIBRE DE COSTA RICA	1. UNITED PROVINCES OF THE CENTRE OF AMERICA; 2. FREE STATE OF COSTA RICA
Costa Rica	1840–48	ESTADO LIBRE DE COSTA RICA	FREE STATE OF COSTA RICA
Costa Rica	1848–1906	1. AMERICA CENTRAL; 2. REPUBLICA DE COSTA RICA	1. CENTRAL AMERICA; 2. REPUBLIC OF COSTA RICA
Costa Rica (state flag)	1906–present	1. AMERICA CENTRAL; 2. REPUBLICA DE COSTA RICA	1. CENTRAL AMERICA; 2. REPUBLIC OF COSTA RICA
Cúcuta	1988–present	MUY NOBLE VALEROSA Y LEAL VILLA DE SAN JOSE DE CUTUCA	MOST NOBLE COURAGEOUS AND LOYAL TOWN OF SAN JOSE DE CUTUCA
Cundinamarca Department	–present	GOB^{O} LIBRE E INDEP^{TE} DE CUNDIN^{C}	FREE AND INDEP^{T} GOV^{T} OF CUNDIN^{C}
Cuscatlán Department	–present	1. CUSCATLAN; 2. 22 DE MAYO 1835	1. CUSCATLAN; 2. 22 MAY 1835
Dominican Republic	–present	1. DIOS PATRIA LIBERTAD; 2. REPÚBLICA DOMINICANA	1. GOD FATHERLAND LIBERTY; 2. DOMINICAN REPUBLIC
El Salvador	1912–present	1. REPUBLICA DE EL SALVADOR EN LA AMÉRICA CENTRAL; 2. DIOS UNIÓN LIBERTAD	1. REPUBLIC OF EL SALVADOR IN CENTRAL AMERICA; 2. GOD UNION LIBERTY
El Salvador (state flag, civil ensign)	1912–present	DIOS UNIÓN LIBERTAD	GOD UNION LIBERTY
Equatorial Guinea	1979–present	UNIDAD PAZ JUSITICIA	UNITY PEACE JUSTICE
Equatorial Guinea	1973–79	1. TRABAJO; 2. UNIDAD PAZ JUSITICIA	1. WORK; 2. UNITY PEACE JUSTICE
Escuintla Department	–present	IZCUINTLAN	IZCUINTLAN
Falcón	–present	MUERA LA TIRANIA Y VIVA LA LIBERTAD	DEATH TO TYRANNY AND LONG LIVE LIBERTY
Flores Department	–present	FLORES	FLORES
Florida Department	–present	1. Florida; 2. Libertad y Progreso	1. Florida; 2. Liberty and Progress
Futrono	1824–38	1. FUTRONO; 2. CHILE	1. FUTRONO; 2. CHILE
Gran Colombia	1821–22	REPUBLICA DE COLOMBIA	REPUBLIC OF COLOMBIA
Gran Colombia	1822–30	SER LIBRE O MORIR	BE FREE OR DIE
Granada Department	–present	GRANADA	GRANADA
Guadalajara Province	–present	P [abbreviation of "Pastrana"]	P [abbreviation of "Pastrana"]
Guatemala	1871–present	1. LIBERTAD; 2. 15 DE SEPTIEMBRE DE 1821	1. LIBERTY; 2. 15 SEPTEMBER 1821
Guatemala (President)	1871–present	1. LIBERTAD; 2. 15 DE SEPTIEMBRE DE 1821	1. LIBERTY; 2. 15 SEPTEMBER 1821
Guatemala (Vice President)	1871–present	1. LIBERTAD; 2. 15 DE SEPTIEMBRE DE 1821	1. LIBERTY; 2. 15 SEPTEMBER 1821
Guatemala	1838–43	ESTADO DE GUATEM. EN LA FEDERACION DEL CENTRO	STATE OF GUATEM. IN THE FEDERATION OF THE CENTRE
Guatemala (state flag)	1843–51	1. GUATEMALA EN CENTRO AMERICA; 2. 15 DE SEPT DE 1821	1. GUATEMALA IN CENTRAL AMERICA; 2. 15 SEPT 1821
Guatemala (state flag)	1851–58	15 DE SEPT DE 1821	15 SEPT 1821
Guaviare Department	–present	1. GUAVIARE; 2. SEMILLAS DE PROGRESO	1. GAUVIARE; 2. SEEDS OF PROGRESS
Heredia Province	–present	1. HEREDIA; 2. LIBERTAD, PAZ Y PROGRESO	1. HEREDIA; 2. LIBERTY, PEACE AND PROGRESS
Hualqui	–present	HUALQUI	HUALQUI
Independencia, Chile	–2023	1. I. MUNICIPALIDAD; [abbreviation of "INDEPENDENCIA MUNICIPALIDAD"]: 2. LIBERTAD PROGRESO; 3. INDEPENDENCIA	1. I. MUNICIPALITY; [abbreviation of "INDEPENDENCIA MUNICIPALITY"]: 2. LIBERTY PROGRESS; 3. INDEPENDENCIA [or, INDEPENDENCE, the meaning of the city name]
Iquique	–present	IQUIQUE	IQUIQUE
Iquitos	–present	1. PERU; 2. IQUITOS; 3. MUNICIPALIDAD DE MAYNAS	1. PERU; 2. IQUITOS; 3. MUNICIPALITY OF MAYNAS
Itapúa Department	–present	1. ITAPUA; 2. PARAGUAY	1. ITAPUA; 2. PARAGUAY
Izabal Department	–present	IZABAL	IZABAL
La Florida, Chile	–present	1. MUNICIPALIDAD LA FLORIDA; 2. 1899	1. LA FLORIDA MUNICIPALITY; 2. 1899
La Paz Department (El Salvador)	–present	1. 31 DE DICEMBRE 1823; 2. ZACATECOLUCA; 3. 11 DE MAYO DE 1844	1. 31 DECEMBER 1823; 2. ZACATECOLUCA; 3. 11 MAY 1844
La Unión Department	–present	1. DPTO. DE LA UNION; 2. 22-JUNIO; 3. 1865–1965	1. DEPT. OF LA UNION; 2. 22 JUNE; 3. 1865–1965
Lavalleja	–present	LAVALLEJA	LAVALLEJA
Máfil	–present	1. MAFIL; 2. 1903; 3. LEY 15.610 – 17-VII-1964; 4. UNIDAD TRABAJO PROGRESO	1. MAFIL; 2. 1903; 3. LAW 15.610 – 17-VII-1964 [17 July 1964]; 4. UNITY WORK PROGRESS
Maipú, Chile	–present	1. CUNA DE LA PATRIA; 2. 5 DE ABRIL DE 1818; 3. MAIPÚ	1. CRADLE OF THE FATHERLAND; 2. 5 APRIL 1818; 3. MAIPÚ
Málaga Province	–present	1. SIEMPRE DENODADA, LA PRIMERA EN EL PELIGRO DE LA LIBERTAD, MUY HOSPITALARIA, MUY BENÉFICA, MUY NOBLE Y MUY LEAL CIUDAD DE MÁLAGA; 2. TANTO MONTA	1. ALWAYS DAUNTLESS, THE FIRST IN DANGER TO FREEDOM, THE MOST HOSPITABLE, MOST CHARITABLE, MOST NOBLE AND MOST LOYAL CITY OF MÁLAGA; 2. IT MAKES NO DIFFERENCE
Málaga	–present	1. SIEMPRE DENODADA, LA PRIMERA EN EL PELIGRO DE LA LIBERTAD, MUY HOSPITALARIA, MUY BENÉFICA, MUY NOBLE Y MUY LEAL CIUDAD DE MÁLAGA; 2. TANTO MONTA	1. ALWAYS DAUNTLESS, THE FIRST IN DANGER TO FREEDOM, THE MOST HOSPITABLE, MOST CHARITABLE, MOST NOBLE AND MOST LOYAL CITY OF MÁLAGA; 2. IT MAKES NO DIFFERENCE
Managua	–present	1. CUIDAD DE MANAGUA; 2. LEAL VILLA DE SANTIAGO DE MANAGUA; 3. JULIO 24, 1846	1. CITY OF MANAGUA; 2. LOYAL TOWN OF SANTIAGO DE MANAGUA; 3. JULY 24, 1846
Maracaibo	–present	1. MUY NOBLE Y LEAL; 2. 1864; 3. 1965	1. MOST NOBLE AND LOYAL; 2. 1864; 3. 1965
Maracay	–present	1. MARACAY; 2. 1 MARZO 1701; 3. 22 ENERO 1814; 4. 12 MARZO 1917	1. MARACAY; 2. 1 MARCH 1701; 3. 22 JANUARY 1814; 4. 12 MARCH 1917
Matagalpa Department	1871–present	1. MATAGALPA; 2. La Perla del Septentrion	1. MATAGALPA; 2. The Pearl of Septentrion [the North]
Maule Region	–present	MAULE	MAULE
Mejillones	–present	ILLUSTRE MUNICIPALIDAD DE MEJILLONES	ILLUSTRIOUS MUNICIPALITY OF MEJILLONES
Mexico (President)	–present	ESTADOS UNIDOS MEXICANOS	UNITED MEXICAN STATES
Mexican Empire	1864–67	EQUIDAD EN LA JUSTICIA	EQUALITY IN JUSTICE
State of Mexico	–present	LIBERTAD TRABAJO CVLTVRA	FREEDOM WORK CULTURE
Michoacán	–present	HEREDAMOS LIBERTAD – LEGAREMOS JUSTICIA SOCIAL	WE INHERITED FREEDOM – WE WILL BEQUEATH SOCIAL JUSTICE
Miranda State	–present	Libertad o Muerte	Liberty or Death
Misiones Department	–present	1. MISIONES; 2. LA BIBLIA GENESIS 12:3; 3. VIII DEPARTAMENTO – MISIONES; 4. REPÚBLICA DEL PARAGUAY	1. MISIONES; 2. THE BIBLE GENESIS 12:3; 3. VIII DEPARTMENT – MISIONES; 4. REPUBLIC OF PARAGUAY
Montana	1981–present	ORO-Y-PLATA	GOLD-AND-SILVER
Moquegua	–present	1. 1541; 2. NOBLE CIUDAD BENEMÉRITA A LA PATRIA; 3. MOQUEGUA	1. 1541; 2. NOBLE CITY MERITORIOUS TO THE HOMELAND; 3. MOQUEGUA
Morazán Department	–present	DIOS UNION PROGRESO	GOD UNION PROGRESS
Morelos	–present	1. TIERRA Y LIBERTAD; 2. LA TIERRA V^{O}LVERA A QUIENES LA TRABAJAN C^{O}N SUS MAN^{O}S	1. LAND AND LIBERTY; 2. THE EARTH WILL RETURN TO THOSE WHO WORK WITH THEIR HANDS
Nicaragua	1971–present	1. REPUBLICA DE NICARAGUA; 2. AMERICA CENTRAL	1. REPUBLIC OF NICARAGUA; 2. CENTRAL AMERICA
Nuevo León	–present	ESTADO DE NUEVO LEON	STATE OF NEUVO LEON
Oaxaca	–present	1. EL RESPETO AL DERECHO AJENO ES LA PAZ; 2. ESTADO LIBRE Y SOBERANO DE OAXACA	1. RESPECT FOR THE RIGHTS OF OTHERS IS PEACE; 2. FREE AND SOVEREIGN STATE OF OAXACA
O'Higgins Region	–present	REGIÓN DEL LIBERTADOR BERNARDO O'HIGGINS	LIBERTADOR BERNARDO O'HIGGINS REGION
Paillaco	–present	PAILLACO MUNICIPALIDAD	PAILLACO MUNICIPALITY
Palencia Province	–present	ARMAS Y CIENCIA	ARMS AND SCIENCE
Panama City	–present	MUNICIPIO DE PANAMÁ	MUNICIPALITY OF PANAMÁ
Papudo	–present	PAPUDO	PAPUDO
Paraguarí Department	–present	1. Cuna de la Independencía del Paraguay; 2. TAVAPY 14-III-1735; 3. PARAGUARI 19-I-1811; 4. IX Departamento – Paraguarí	1. Cradle of the Independence of Paraguay; 2. TAVAPY 14-III-1735 [4 March 1735]; 3. PARAGUARI 19-I-1811 [19 January 1811]; 4. IX Department – Paraguarí
Paraguay	1842–present	1. REPUBLICA DEL PARAGUAY (obverse); 2. PAZ Y JUSTICIA (reverse)	1. REPUBLIC OF PARAGUAY; 2. PEACE AND JUSTICE
Paraguay (President)	–present	REPUBLICA DEL PARAGUAY	REPUBLIC OF PARAGUAY
Philippines (obverse)	1898–1901	FUERZAS EXPEDICIONARIAS DEL NORTE DE LUZON	EXPEDITIONARY FORCES OF NORTHERN LUZON
Philippines (reverse)	1898–1901	LIBERTAD JUSTICIA E IGUALDAD	LIBERTY JUSTICE AND EQUALITY
Pichilemu	–present	1. PICHILEMU; 2. 22-XII 1891	1. PICHILEMU; 2. 22-XII 1891 [22 December 1891]
Pirque	–present	PIRQUE	PIRQUE
Pontevedra Province	–present	EXCMA. DIPUTACIÓN PROVINCIAL DE PONTEVEDRA	HON. PROVINCIAL GOVERNMENT OF PONTEVEDRA
Puebla	–present	1. UNIDOS EN EL TIEMPO EN EL ESFUERZO EN LA JUSTICIA Y EN LA ESPERANZA; 2. 5 MAYO 1862; 3. ESTADO LIBRE Y SOBERANO DE PUEBLA	1. UNITED IN TIME IN EFFORT IN JUSTICE AND IN HOPE; 2. 8 MAY 1862; 3. FREE AND SOVEREIGN STATE OF PUEBLA
Puntarenas Province	–present	1848	1848
Putre	–present	MUNICIPALIDAD DE PUTRE	MUNICIPALITY OF PUTRE
Región Autónoma del Atlántico Norte	–present	1. REGION AUTONOMA DEL ATLANTICO NORTE; 2. REPUBLICA DE NICARAGUA	1. NORTH ATLANTIC AUTONOMOUS REGION; 2. REPUBLIC OF NICARAGUA
Retalhuleu Department	–present	1. RETALHULEU; 2. DIOS UNION LIBERTAD	1. RETALHULEU; 2. GOD UNION LIBERTY
Rivera Department	–present	RIVERA	RIVERA
Rocha Department	–present	ROCHA	ROCHA
Salto Department	–present	1. SALTO; 2. TRABAJO SABIOURIA PRUDENCIA	1. SALTO; 2. WORK WISDOM PRUDENCE
San Felipe, Chile	–present	F F	F F
San Francisco	1940–present	ORO EN PAZ. FIERRO EN GUERRA.	GOLD IN PEACE. IRON IN WAR.
San Juan Province	–present	EN UNION Y LIBERTAD	IN UNION AND LIBERTY
San Juan, Puerto Rico	–present	Por su constancia amor y fidelidad es muy noble y muy leal esta ciudad	For its perseverance love and fidelity this city is most noble and most loyal
San Miguel Department and San Miguel, El Salvador	–present	1. MUY NOBLE Y LEAL CIUDAD DE SAN MIGUEL; 2. 1530; 3. 1944	1. MOST NOBLE AND LOYAL CITY OF SAN MIGUEL; 2. 1530; 3. 1944
San Pedro Department, Paraguay	–present	1. REPUBLICA DEL PARAGUAY; 2. GOBERNACION DE SAN PEDRO	1. REPUBLIC OF PARAGUAY; 2. GOVERNORSHIP OF SAN PEDRO
San Salvador Department and San Salvador	–present	1. SAN SALVADOR; 2. 1525; 3. 1811; 4. 1821	1. SAN SALVADOR; 2. 1525; 3. 1811; 4. 1821
Santa Ana Department and Santa Ana, El Salvador	–present	1. SANTA ANA; 2. EL SALVADOR C.A.	1. SANTA ANA; 2. EL SALVADOR C.A.
Santa Elena Province	2007–present	1. Provincia de Santa Elena; 2. 7-Nov 2007; 3. 1839-1937-1993	1. Province of Santa Elena; 2. 7-Nov 2007; 3. 1839-1937-1993
Santa Fe Province	–present	PROVINCIA INVENCIBLE DE SANTA FE	INVINCIBLE PROVINCE OF SANTA FE
Santa Rosa Department, Guatemala	–present	1. Cuilapa; 2. Sta. Rosa	1. Cuilapa; 2. Sta. Rosa
Santiago Metropolitan Region	–present	1. CHILE; 2. GOBIERNO REGIONAL METROPOLITANO	1. CHILE; 2. GOVERNMENT OF THE METROPOLITAN REGION
San Vicente Department and San Vicente, El Salvador	–present	1. 26 de septembre de 1536; 2. CIUDAD DE SAN VICENTE DE AUSTRIA Y LORENZANA	1. 26 September 1536; 2. CITY OF SAN VICENTE OF AUSTRIA AND LORENZANA
Seville Province	–present	NO8DO [visual representation of "NO MADEJA DO", a homophone of "NO ME HA DEJADO"]	visual representation of SHE HAS NOT ABANDONED ME
Seville	–present	NO8DO [visual representation of "NO MADEJA DO", a homophone of "NO ME HA DEJADO"]	visual representation of SHE HAS NOT ABANDONED ME
Sinaloa	–present	1. SINALOA; 2. 1831	1. SINALOA; 2. 1831
Soacha	–present	SUACHA	SOACHA
Sololá Department	–present	1. SOLOLA; 2. TIERRA DEL PAISAJE	1. SOLOLA; 2. LAND OF SCENERY
Sonora	–present	ESTADO DE SONORA	STATE OF SENORA
Sonsonate Department and Sonsonate, El Salvador	–present	N [abbreviation of "Norte"]	N [abbreviation of "North"]
Soria Province	–present	SORIA PURA CABEZA DE ESTREMADURA	SORIA PURE HEAD OF EXTREMADURA
Soriano Department	–present	AQUI NACIO LA PATRIA	HERE WAS BORN THE HOMELAND
Spain	1939–81	UNA GRANDE LIBRE	ONE GREAT FREE
Spain (President)	1931–36	N A [abbreviation of "Niceto Alcala Zamora"]	
Spain (President)	1936–39	M A [abbreviation of "Manuel Azaña"]	
Suesca	–present	SUESCA	SUESCA
Tacna	–present	HEROICA CIUDAD DE SAN PEDRO DE TACNA	HEROIC CITY OF SAN PEDRO DE TACNA
Tarapacá Region	–present	1. I REGIÓN; 2. TARAPACÁ; 3. PAMPA; 4. PRESENTE FUTURO DE CHILE	1. REGION I 2. TARAPACÁ; 3. PAMPAS; 4. PRESENT FUTURE OF CHILE
Tarragona Province	–present	1. T; [abbreviation of "Tarragona"]: 2. DIPUTACIÓN PROVINCIAL DE TARRAGONA	1. T; [abbreviation of "Tarragona"]: 2. PROVINCIAL GOVERNMENT OF TARRAGONA
Tenjo	–present	DIGNIDAD, TRABAJO, LIBERTAD	DIGNITY, WORK, LIBERTY
Tlaxcala	–present	1. I; [abbreviation of "Isabel"]: 2. F; [abbreviation of "Fernando"]	1. I; [abbreviation of "Isabella"]: 2. F; [abbreviation of "Ferdinand"]
Tocaima	–present	1. HIDALGA Y NOBLE CIUDAD SALUD DE COLOMBIA; 2. TOCAIMA	1. HIGH AND NOBLE CITY HEALTH OF COLOMBIA; 2. TOCAIMA
Totonicapán Department	–present	1. LIBERTAD IGUALDAD; 2. 23 DE OCTUBRE 1825	1. LIBERTY EQUALITY; 2. 23 OCTOBER 1825
Tumbes, Peru	–present	TUMBES	
Uruguay (Treinta y Tres)	–present	LIBERTAD O MUERTE	LIBERTY OR DEATH
Valladolid Province	–present	EXCMA DIPUTACIÓN PROVINCIAL VALLADOLID	HON PROVINCIAL GOVERNMENT OF VALLADOLID
Valparaíso	–present	CUIDAD DE VALPARAÍSO	CITY OF VALPARAÍSO
Valparaíso Region	–present	REGIÓN VALPARAÍSO	VALPARAÍSO REGION
Venezuela	1836–59	1. 19 DE ABRIL DE 1810; 2. INDEPENDENCIA; 3. 20 DE FEBRERO DE 1859; 4. FEDERACIÓN; 5. REPÚBLICA DE VENEZUELA	1. 19 APRIL 1810; 2. INDEPENDENCE; 3. 20 FEBRUARY 1859; 4. FEDERATION; 5. REPUBLIC OF VENEZUELA
Venezuela (state flag)	1954–present	1. 19 DE ABRIL DE 1810; 2. INDEPENDENCIA; 3. 20 DE FEBRERO DE 1859; 4. FEDERACIÓN; 5. REPÚBLICA BOLIVARIANA DE VENEZUELA	1. 19 APRIL 1810; 2. INDEPENDENCE; 3. 20 FEBRUARY 1859; 4. FEDERATION; 5. BOLIVARIAN REPUBLIC OF VENEZUELA
Venezuela (President)	–present was added in 2006.	1. 19 DE ABRIL DE 1810; 2. INDEPENDENCIA; 3. 20 DE FEBRERO DE 1859; 4. FEDERACIÓN; 5. REPÚBLICA BOLIVARIANA DE VENEZUELA	1. 19 APRIL 1810; 2. INDEPENDENCE; 3. 20 FEBRUARY 1859; 4. FEDERATION; 5. BOLIVARIAN REPUBLIC OF VENEZUELA
Yerbas Buenas	–present	Y B [abbreviation of "Yerbas Buenas"]	
Yucatán	–present	YUCATAN	
Yungay, Chile	–present	YUNGAY	
Zacapa Department	–present	ZACAPA	

== See also ==
- List of inscribed flags
