= Ahuachapán =

- District
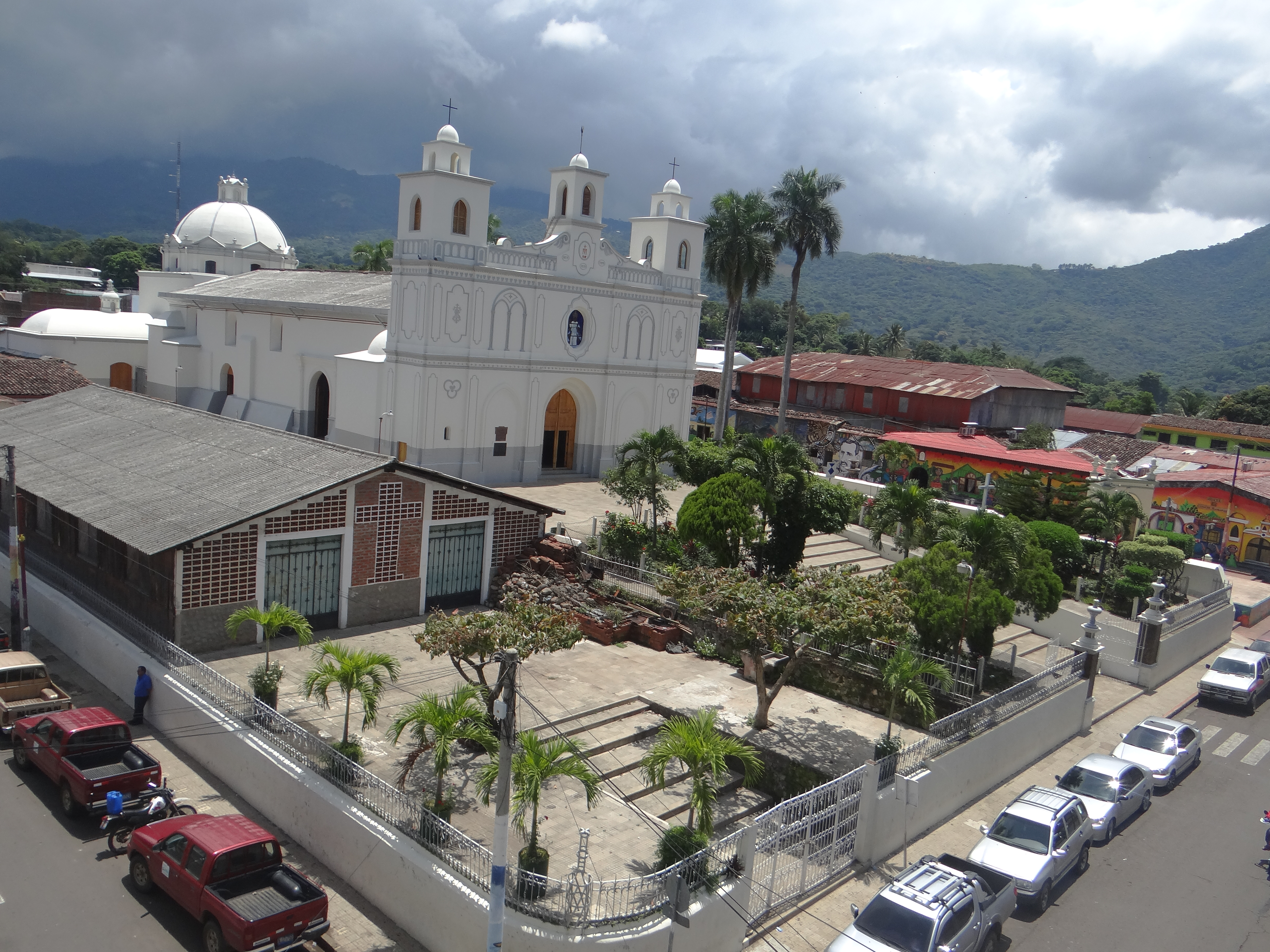
- Our Lady of the Assumption Parish

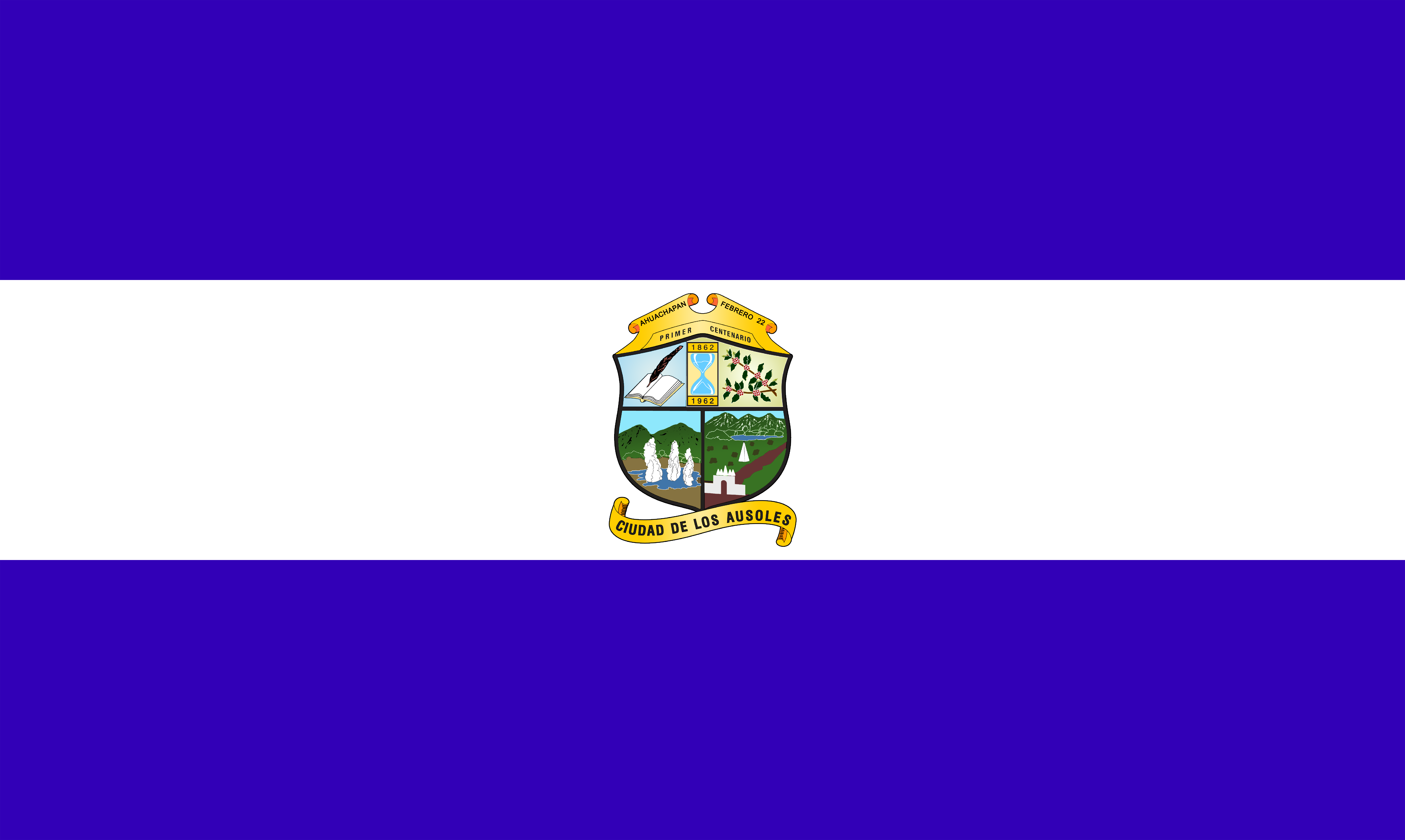
- Flag

- Location in El Salvador
- Coordinates: 13°55′01″N 89°51′00″W
- Country: El Salvador
- Department: Ahuachapán
- Municipality: Ahuachapán Centro
- Founded: 1862

Area
  - District: 244.84 km^{2} (94.53 sq mi)
  - Metro: 244.84 km^{2} (94.53 sq mi)
- Elevation: 799 m (2,621 ft)

Population (2024)
  - District: 127,301
  - Estimate (2026): 130,348
  - Rank: 8th in El Salvador; 6th (Urban Area)
  - Density: 519.94/km^{2} (1,346.6/sq mi)
  - Urban: 84,825
  - Urban (District): 100,223
- Time zone: UTC-06:00 (CST)
- Postal code: AH-01
- Website: www.alcaldiadeahuachapan.org.sv

Ahuachapán (Spanish pronunciation: [awatʃaˈpan]) is a city, district, and the capital of the Ahuachapán Department in western El Salvador. The district, including the city, covers an area of 244.84 km^{2} and as of 2007 has a population of 110,511 people. Situated near the Guatemalan border, it is the westernmost city in the country and is the center of an agricultural region producing primarily coffee.

Ahuachapán is the site of a geothermal power plant and a hydroelectric station. The local geothermal activity produces many steam vents, visible throughout the surrounding mountains.

Among other things, Ahuachapan is also the birthplace of notable Salvadoran poet Alfredo Espino and is about an hour's drive from the national wildlife park El Imposible.

== History ==
Ahuachapán was founded by Mayan people of the Poqomam tribe in the 5th century, and was invaded in the 15th century by the Izalcos people. It officially gained city status in El Salvador on 11 February 1862 and became the departmental capital on 9 February 1899.

== Geography ==
The district of Ahuachapán is located 100 km from the capital city San Salvador. To the north it borders San Lorenzo and the Republic of Guatemala. It is surrounded by San Lorenzo, Atiquizaya and Turín; by Juayúa, Apaneca, and Tacuba to the south. The climate of the district is very warm with the temperatures oscillating between 22 °C and 27 °C.

The principal river is the Río Paz. There are other tributaries but the Río Paz forms a natural border between El Salvador and Guatemala.

=== Local attractions ===
==== Monuments/main attractions ====
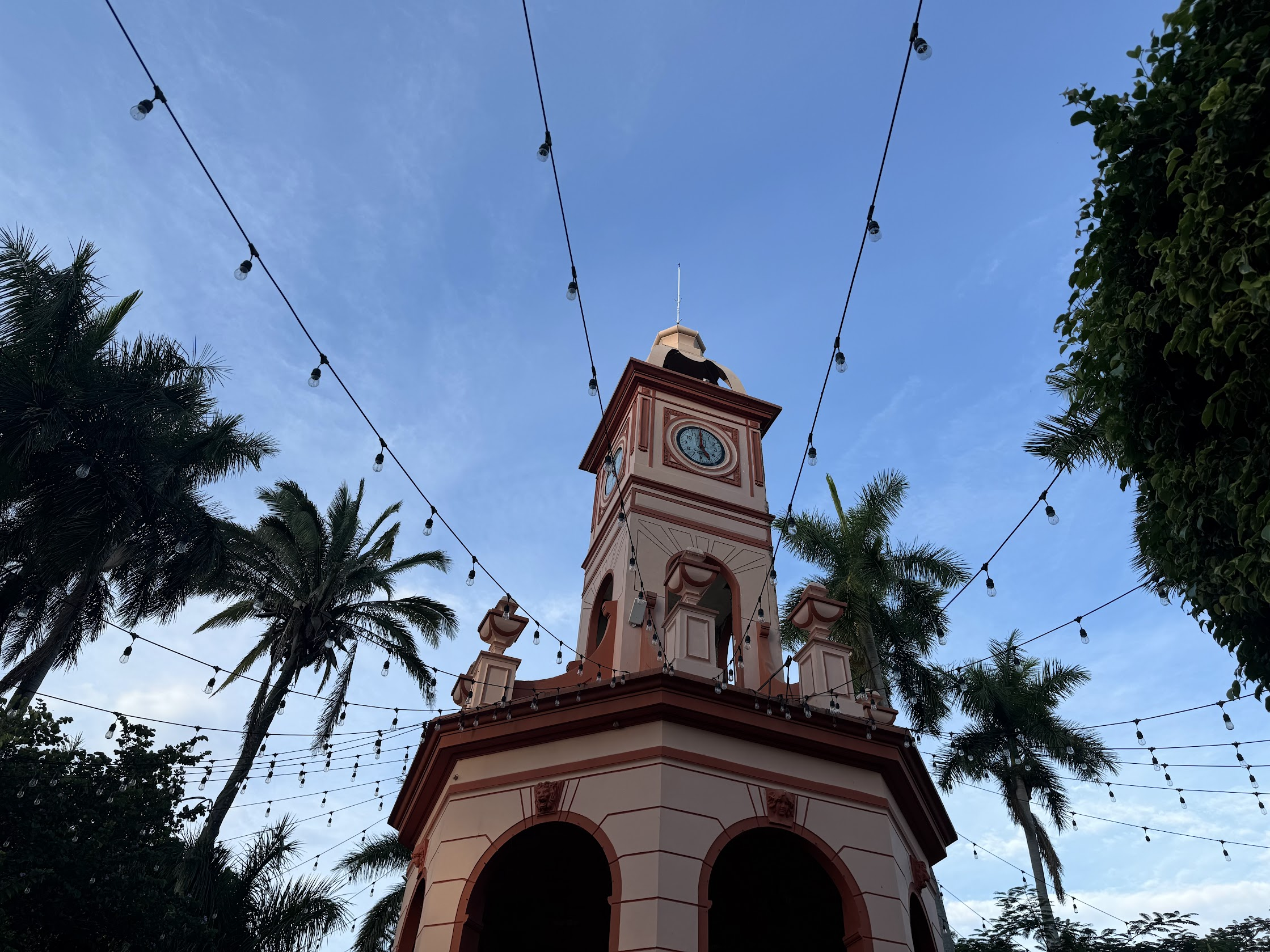
Parque La Concordia

Near the Iglesia La Asunción, the Francisco Menéndez Park has a monument to honor General Francisco Menéndez who was president of the republic. There is a bronze plate indicating the house where he lived. One of the main attractions is the Central Plaza, which contains: the Central Park, known as Parque Concordia, surrounded by City Hall (a modern style building with a little resemblance of art deco, rebuilt after a fire in the 1950s), the town's main church, Iglesia de La Asunción, which is over 100 years old, and the Pasaje Concordia, also known as "the new place in town," that was restored in the early twenty first century and is a pedestrian-only street.

==== Lagoon of El Espino ====
It was formerly called Huitziapan or "Laguna de la Espina" and is four kilometers to the north-west of the city of Ahuachapan, along the international highway to Guatemala. Between this body of water and the city of Ahuachapán, the first battle in the history of independent Central America took place; the battle of Espino, on 12 March 1822..

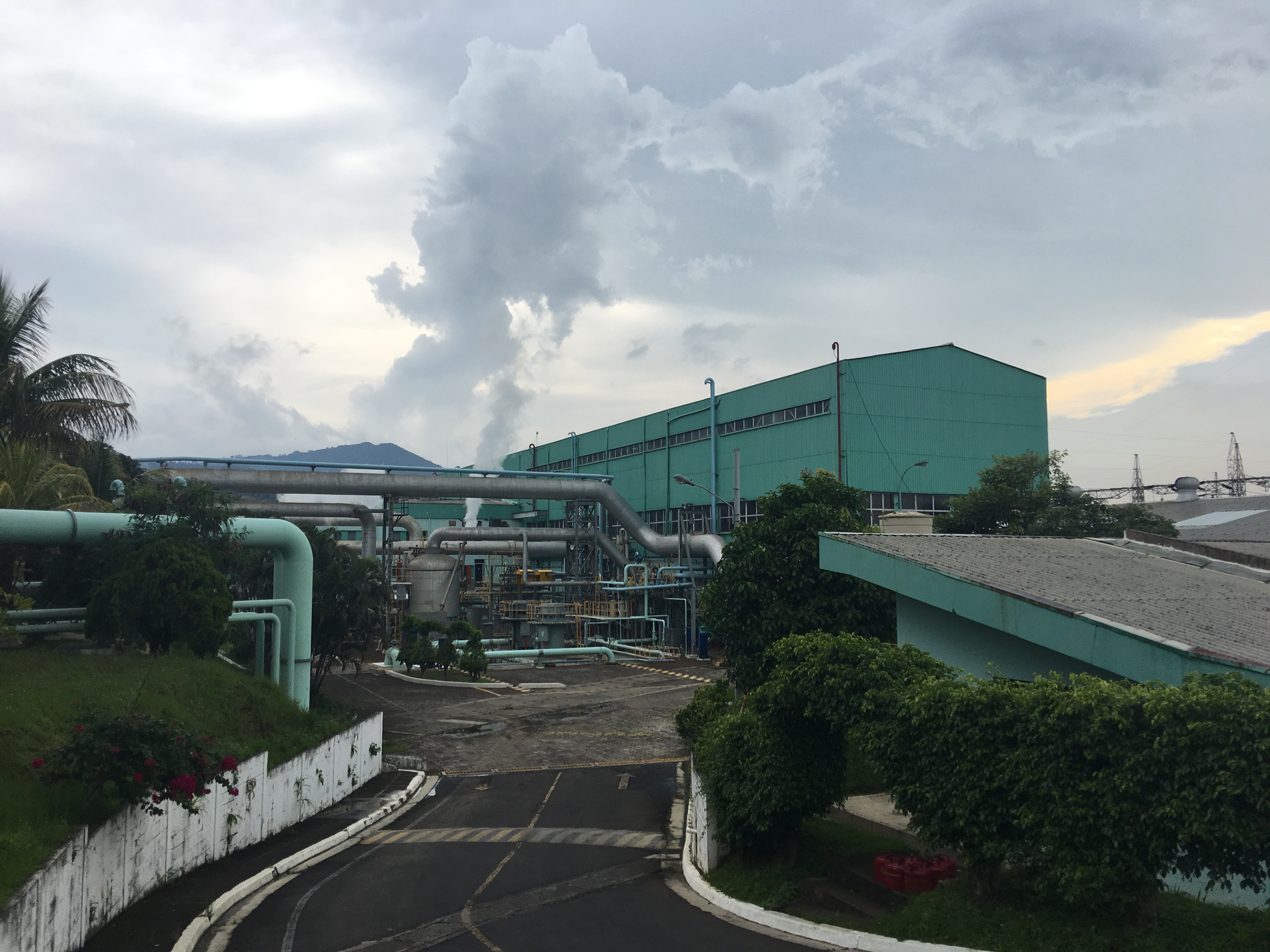
Ahuachapán geothermal power plant

Other attractions include Los Ausoles (an area of geysers, small and large steam vents and bubbling hot fountains), the Lagoon Morán, Atehuecillas and Malacatiupán. Close to Las Chinamas is "Los Encuentros" where the "Rio Paz" river and the "El Pulula" river (Guatemalan river) merge. "La Poza de la Yerba Buena" of the Pueblo Viejo river in the Cantón Santa Cruz is nearby. El Arco Durán, situated in the perimeter of the city of Ahuachapán, is a replica of a famous French arch, with all kinds of delicious and typical Salvadorean "Pupusas" nearby.

=== Administrative divisions ===
==== Communities ====
The district is divided into 29 communities.

These are: Ashapuco, Chancuyo, Chipilapa, Cuyanausul, El Anonal, Cantón Platanares, El Roble, El Tigre, El Barro, Guayaltepec, La Coyotera, La Danta, La Montañita, Las Chinamas (Puesto Fronterizo), Llano de Doña María, Llano de La Laguna o El Espino, Loma de La Gloria, Los Huatales, Los Magueyes, Los Toles, Nejapa, Palo Pique, Río Frío, San Lázaro, San Ramón, Santa Cruz, Santa Rosa Acacalco, Suntecumat y Tacubita.

==== Towns and villages in the district ====
- Agua Shuca
- Ahuachapán
- Ashapuco
- Ataco
- Calapa
- cara sucia
- Chancuyo
- Chipilapa
- Cuyanausul
- El Anonal
- El Barro
- El Espino
- El Jobo
- El Junquillo
- El Mojón
- El Roble
- El Saitillal
- El Tigre
- Guayaltepec
- Hacienda San Isidro
- Hacienda San Luis
- La Angostura
- La Coyotera
- La Danta
- La Guascota
- La Montañita
- Las Chinamas
- Las Delicias
- Llano de Doña Maria
- Llano de La Laguna
- Loma de La Gloria
- Los Horcones
- Los Huatales
- Los Magueyes
- Los Toles
- Palo Pique
- Río Frío
- San José
- San Lázaro
- San Luis
- San Ramón
- San Raymundo
- San Venancio
- Santa Cruz
- Santa Rita
- Santa Rosa Acacalco
- Suntecumat
- Tacuba

=== Climate ===
Climate data for Ahuachapán (1991–2020)
Month	Jan	Feb	Mar	Apr	May	Jun	Jul	Aug	Sep	Oct	Nov	Dec	Year
Mean daily maximum °C (°F)	30.7 (87.3)	32.0 (89.6)	33.2 (91.8)	33.6 (92.5)	32.0 (89.6)	30.1 (86.2)	30.4 (86.7)	30.5 (86.9)	29.7 (85.5)	29.6 (85.3)	30.0 (86.0)	30.3 (86.5)	31.0 (87.8)
Daily mean °C (°F)	22.4 (72.3)	23.1 (73.6)	24.0 (75.2)	24.9 (76.8)	24.6 (76.3)	23.7 (74.7)	23.9 (75.0)	23.8 (74.8)	23.2 (73.8)	23.1 (73.6)	22.8 (73.0)	22.5 (72.5)	23.5 (74.3)
Mean daily minimum °C (°F)	17.1 (62.8)	17.6 (63.7)	18.4 (65.1)	19.6 (67.3)	20.2 (68.4)	19.8 (67.6)	19.8 (67.6)	19.6 (67.3)	19.6 (67.3)	19.4 (66.9)	18.4 (65.1)	17.5 (63.5)	18.9 (66.0)
Average precipitation mm (inches)	1.1 (0.04)	4.2 (0.17)	5.7 (0.22)	30.3 (1.19)	151.2 (5.95)	275.7 (10.85)	278.1 (10.95)	286.1 (11.26)	295.3 (11.63)	177.4 (6.98)	38.9 (1.53)	5.9 (0.23)	1,549.7 (61.01)
Average relative humidity (%)	68	68	67	70	77	82	79	81	85	82	74	72	75.4
Source: Ministerio de Medio Ambiente y Recursos Naturales

== Economy ==
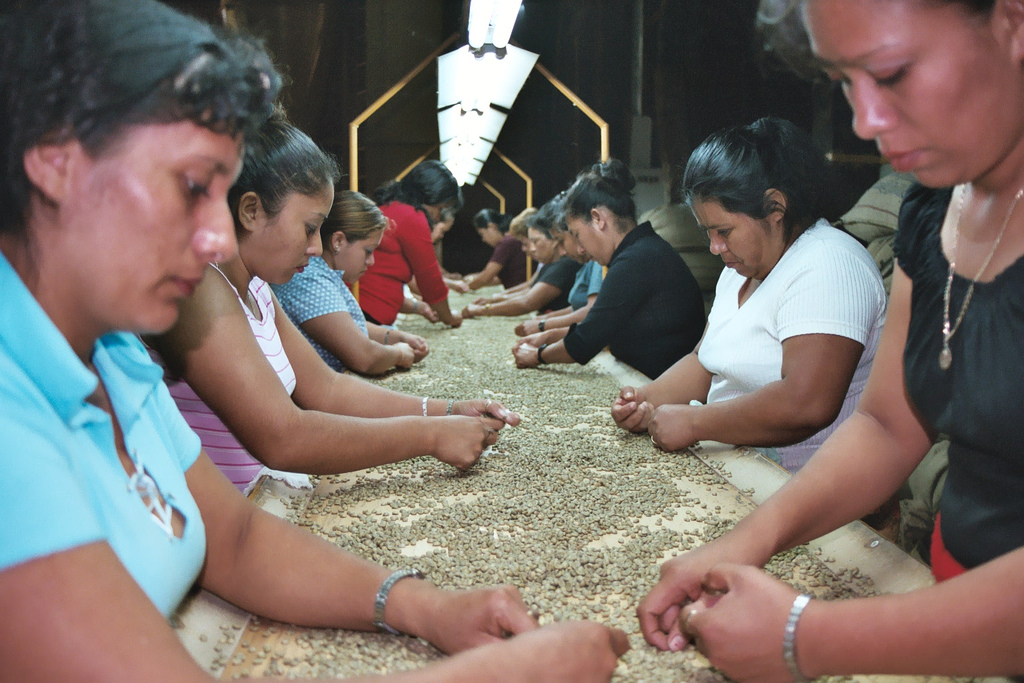
Green Coffee processing in Ahuachapan

The most important industries are geothermal energy, coffee, textiles and construction materials.

== Traditions ==
The most important tradition is the Día de los Farolitos (Day of the Little Lantern Lights), held every year on 7 September, where a parade and celebration is conducted to honor the birth of the Virgin Mary.

== Notable people ==
- Alfredo Espino
- Ricardo Trigueros Deleón
- Humberto Escapini
- Roberto Galicia
- Miguel Ángel Espino
- Santiago José Celis
- Mauricio Linares Aguilar
- Francisco Menéndez
- Alvaro Magaña Borja
- Timoteo Menéndez
- Mario Benjamín Castro
- Francisco Javier Roman-Bardales

== Sports ==
The Once Municipal (Municipal Eleven) is the local professional association football club of the Department of Ahuachapán. The home stadium of Once Municipal is Estadio Simeón Magaña.

== See also ==
- Concepción de Ataco
- Apaneca
- Sonsonate
- San Salvador
