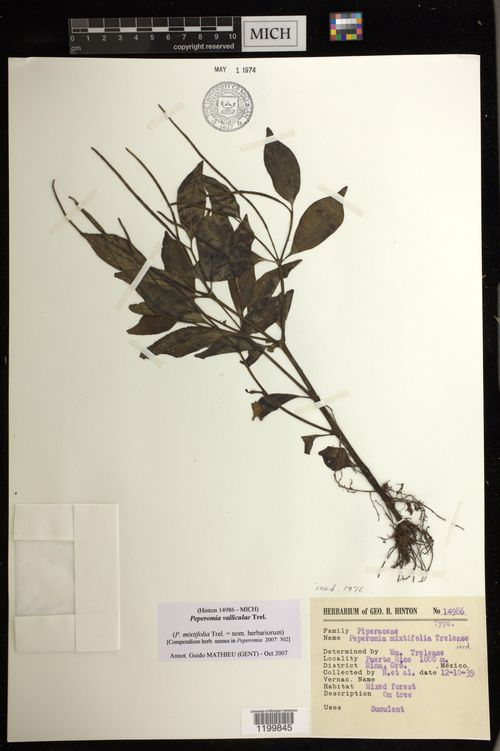

Scientific classification
- Kingdom: Plantae
- Clade: Embryophytes
- Clade: Tracheophytes
- Clade: Angiosperms
- Clade: Magnoliids
- Order: Piperales
- Family: Piperaceae
- Genus: Peperomia
- Species: P. valliculae

Binomial name
- Peperomia valliculae Trel.

= Peperomia valliculae =

Species of epiphyte

Peperomia valliculae is a species of epiphyte and herb from the genus 'Peperomia'. Peperomia valliculae can mostly be found in Central America. It primarily grows in wet tropical biomes.

== Etymology ==
In Latin, Vallicula means valley. This refers to the type locality, Cerro Valle Chiquito, Panama.

== Distribution ==
Peperomia valliculae can be found in Panama, El Salvador, Guatemala, and Mexico. Specimens can be found at an altitude of 700–1100 meters.

- Panama
  - Coclé Province
    - Cerro Valle Chiquito
    - Anton Valley
  - Colón
- El Salvador
  - Ahuachapán
  - Santa Ana
- Guatemala
  - San Marcos
- Mexico
  - Guerrero

== Description ==
Its a rather large, assurgent herb; with stems 3-5 millimeters thick below, when dry, it ascends to 30 cm. leaves alternate or sometimes 2 or 3 at a node. The leaves that alternate are diamond-shaped and wide near the tip, has a blunt growing point, slightly indented, and have a triangular leaf base, which is 1–2 cm. It is glabrous; round bract stem, having dotted teeth with glands; fruit ovoid, about 0.5 millimeters. long, rather obscurely palmately 3-nerved, are glabrous on both side, cilio-late toward the apex, dark-glandular-dotted, it has a drying firm and it is opaque, Its petioles are 5-10 millimeters long, grooved above. Spikes that are terminal and axillary are 1 millimeter thick and 10-18 centimeters long. Its peduncles are 1-2 centimeters long.
