= Los Ausoles =

Group of Hot Springs in El Salvador

Coordinates: 13.9154°N 89.8171°W

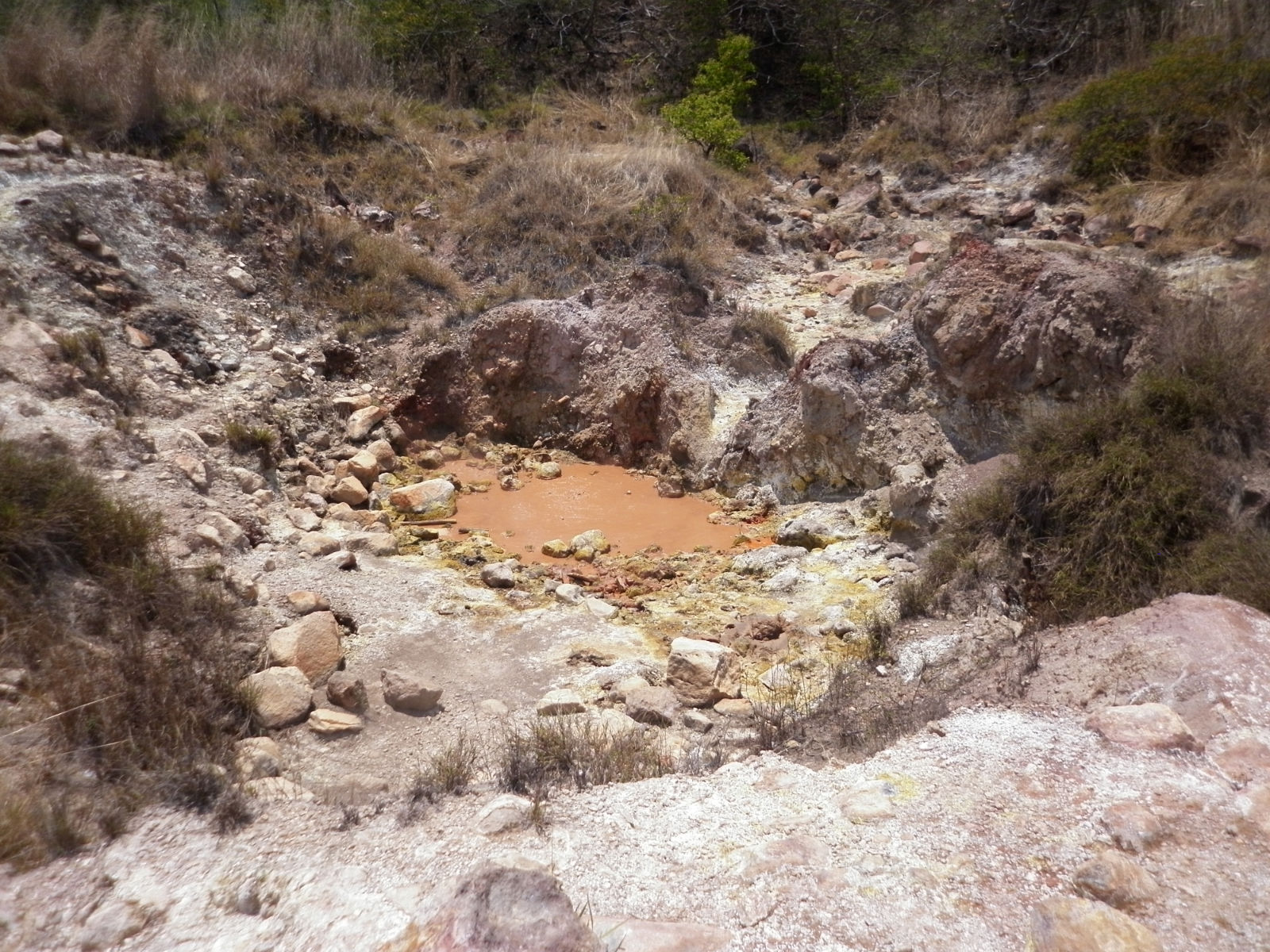
Los Ausoles

Los Ausoles are a group of hot springs located 20 km (12 mi) north of Ahuachapán in El Salvador. The area has been described as "the capital of Central American geothermal." Many of the springs in the area produce heavy steam, and as of 1850, were described as "semi-fluid mass of mud and water in a state of ebullition, continually throwing large heavy bubbles to the surfaces; this heated mass is in some black, in others red, or of the ochry colour."

There are many hot springs in the area, however, there are five main springs:

- El Zapote is a crater approximately 20 m (66 ft) in diameter
- Valdivieso is approximately 20 m (66 ft) in diameter and comprises 4 different openings. It is known for its blue colored sulfur.
- El Barreal comprises mud ponds.
- La Labor is approximately 200 m (660 ft) in diameter. It has seven openings with strong smells and noise, and clay and mud geysers.
- El Salitre is a hot water lagoon.
