= Concepción de Ataco =

- District
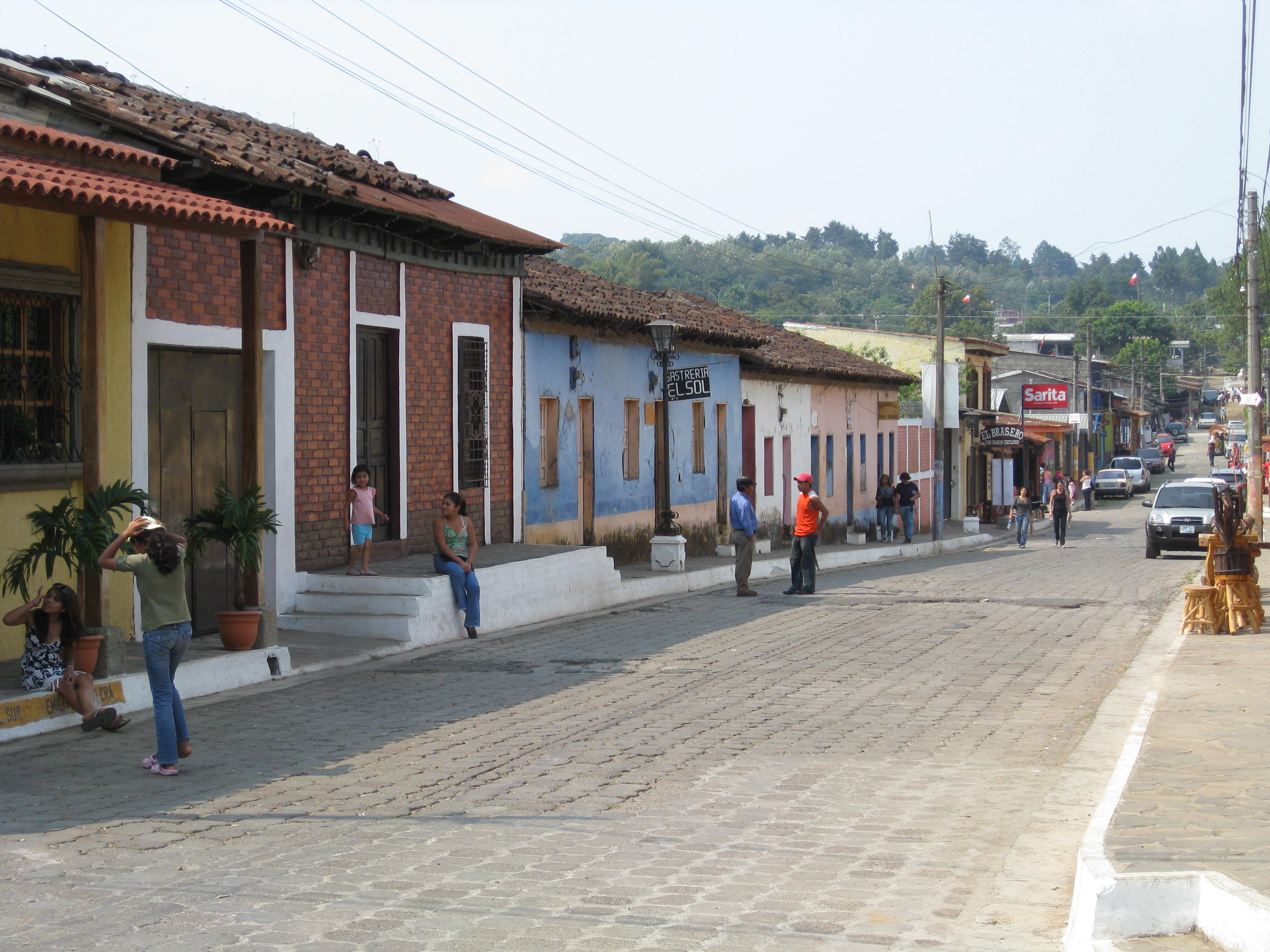
- 1 Avenida. Concepcion de Ataco

- Location in El Salvador
- Coordinates: 13°52′N 89°51′W
- Country: El Salvador
- Department: Ahuachapán
- Municipality: Ahuachapán Centro
- Established: 1770

Government
  - Type: Democratic

Area
  - District: 23.57 sq mi (61.04 km^{2})
- Elevation: 4,070 ft (1,240 m)

Population (2024)
  - District: 12,968
  - Rank: 104th in El Salvador
  - Urban: 7,849
  - Rural: 5,119
- Time zone: UTC-6 (Central America)
- Area code: (503)
- HDI 2010: 0.695 – high

Concepción de Ataco is a district and city within the Ahuachapán Department, El Salvador. It has an area of 61.03 km^{2} and a population of 18,101 inhabitants (est. 2006).

The district is divided into 11 communities, which are: El Arco, El Limo, El Naranjito, El Tronconal, La Ceiba, La Joya de los Apante, La Planxa, San Jose, Shucutitán and Texusín Chirizo. Atacos's population has pre-Columbian origins and was founded by Pipiles in the central Cordillera de Apaneca.

In Nawat, Ataco means "high place of springs.”

Concepción de Ataco's "sister city" is Elk Grove, California. Ataco also shares a sister city relationship with Fountain Hills, Arizona.

== History ==
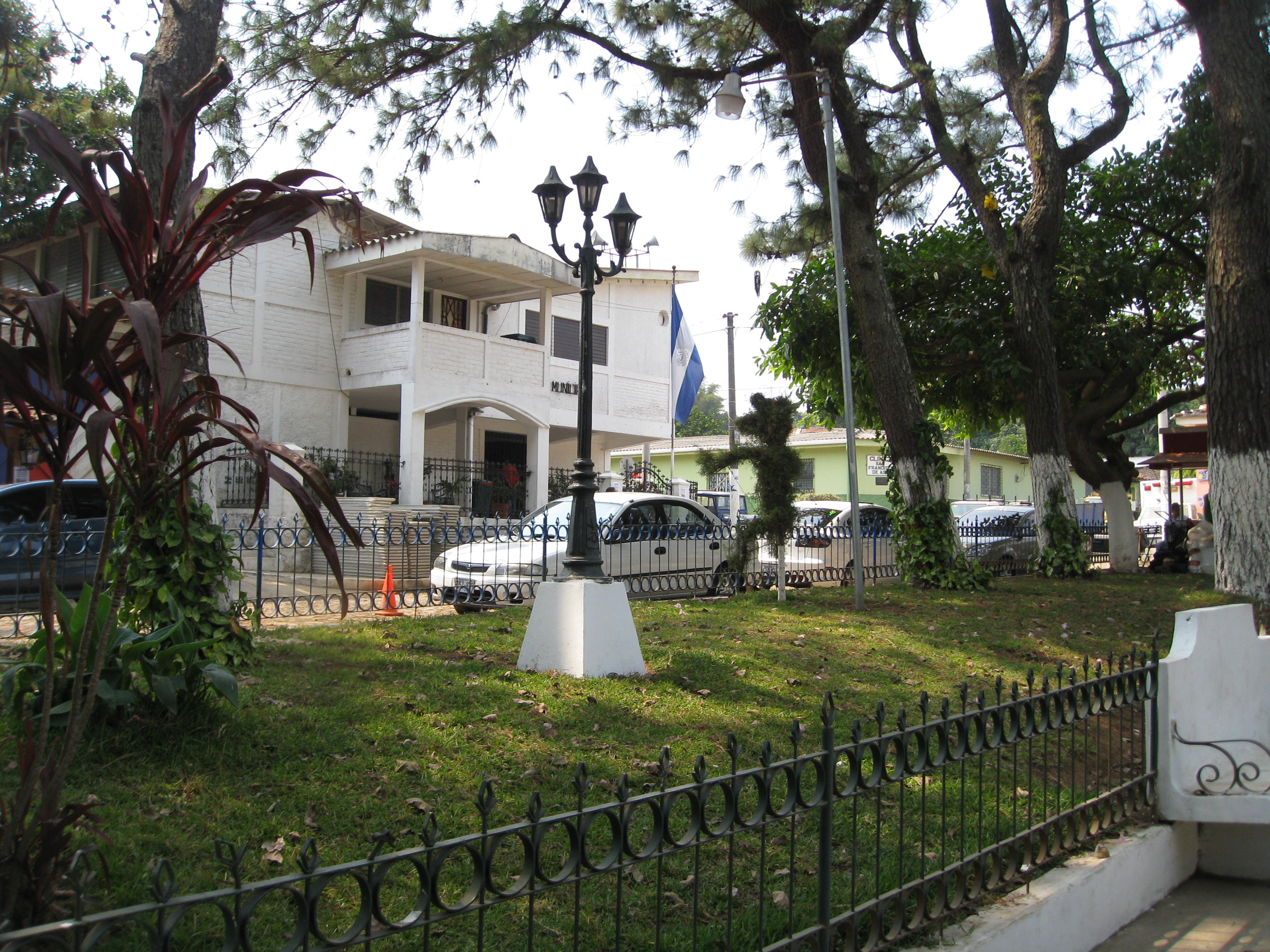
City Hall

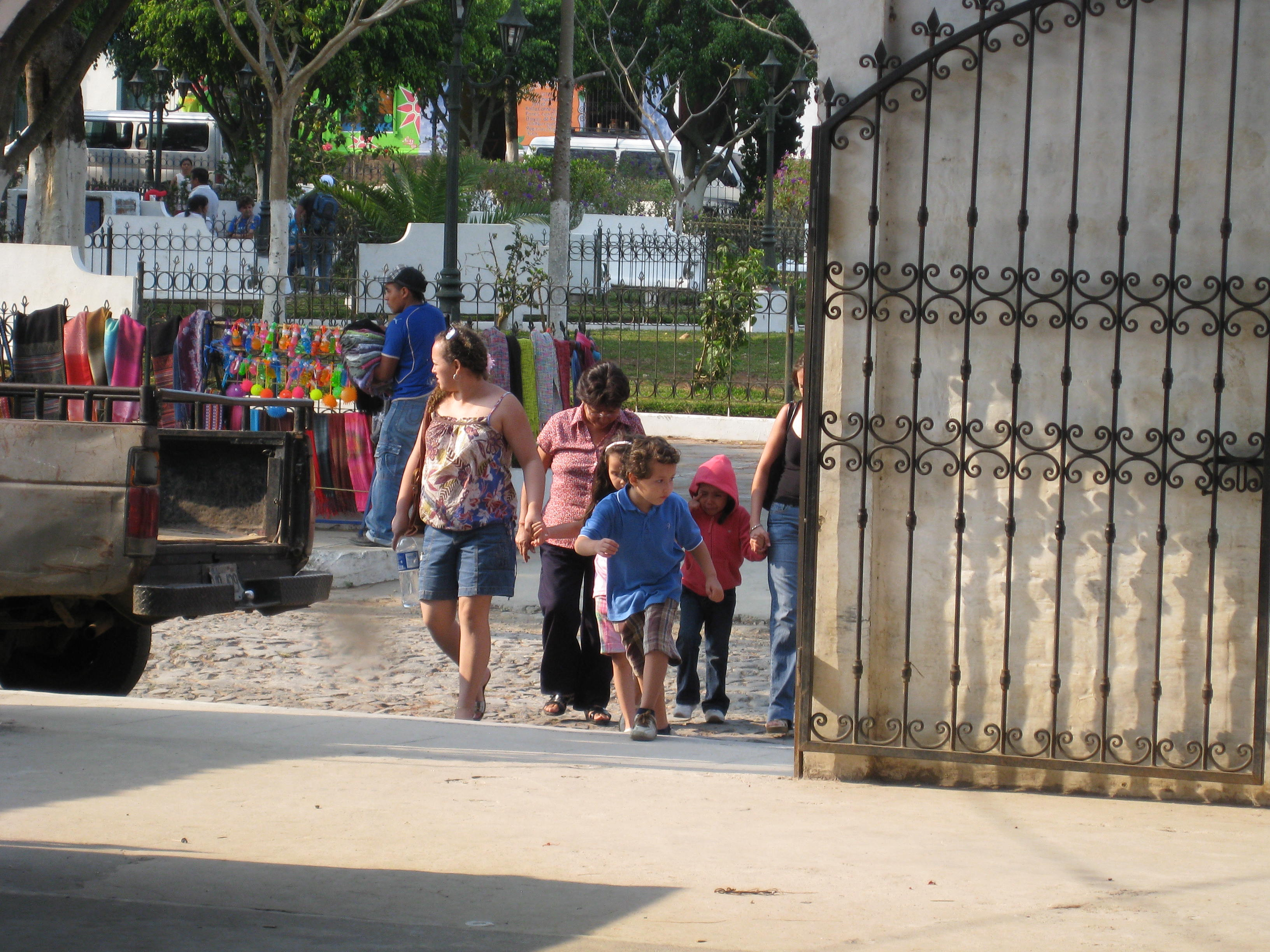
Artesian Market

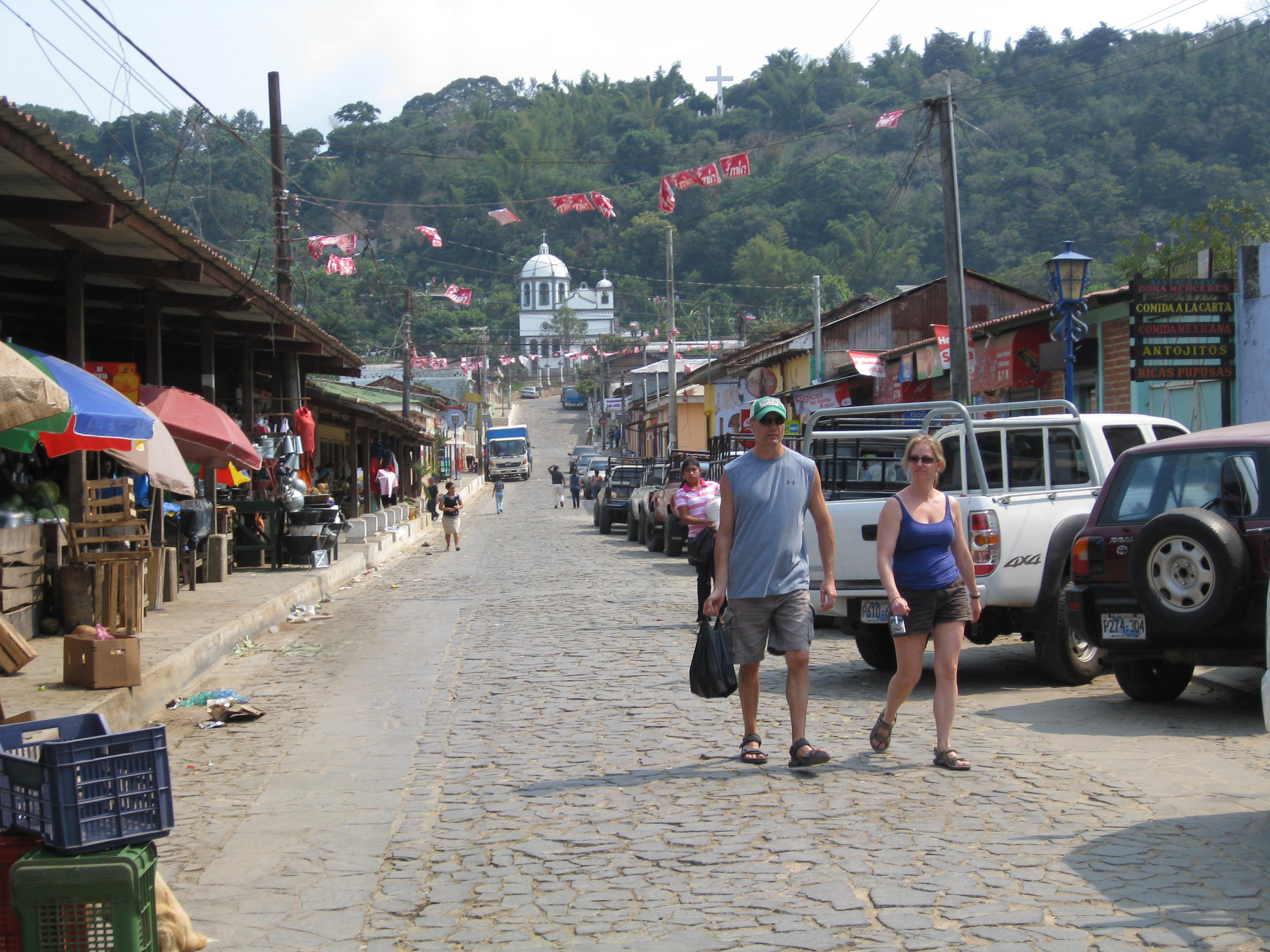
Central Market

According to Archbishop Pedro Cortes y Larraz, Ataco in 1770 belonged to the parish of Ahuachapán. Its population consisted of 303 families with 784 indigenous people who spoke the Nahuat language of the Pipil people, they also spoke and understood Spanish.

In the colonial period Ataco belonged to the administration of the Izalco province or the Sonsonate municipality. As of June 12, 1824 belonged to the municipality of primitive and great department of Sonsonate. Due to the law of July 4, 1832 this town was made part of the jurisdiction of the judicial district of Ahuachapán. By legislative decree of February 8, 1855 the town was incorporated into the department of Santa Ana. According to a municipal report dated 20 April 1858, Ataco had a population of 972 inhabitants.

In 1866 the municipalities of Ataco asked the authorities, that the town be moved from the Santa Ana department to the Sonsonate department for the convenience of local interests. This application did not succeed.

By Legislative Decree dated 26 February 1869 Ataco joined the district and department of Ahuachapán.

In the year 1890 the city had 2,860 inhabitants.

Concepcion de Ataco has stores that sell a variety of crafts including sculptures, ornaments, weavings, embroidery, candles, key chains, and coffee. Ataco's Indigenous population still retains many of the customs and traditions of their ancestors—these pass from generation to generation through oral tradition, preserving the culture and language (Nahuatl).

== Municipal Government ==
The small town, has the basic services (water, electricity, sewage, train toilet, telephone, Internet, post office, police and magistrates' court). The town has 4 branches of the agricultural sector, all benefiting from coffee, so it follows that the municipality is mainly agricultural. There are 4 foundations or organizations concerned with agriculture and community development: FUNDATACO Foundation (ATAC), ADECOA (Association for Community Development Ataco) FUNADIC (Ataqueña Foundation for the Integral Development Community) and Romero Association. The city’s economy has also been influenced by tourism starting in 2004 and that is the reason why the city has grown prosperous. Many investors—both local and international—are opening businesses like hotels, restaurants, bars, etc.

== Tourism ==
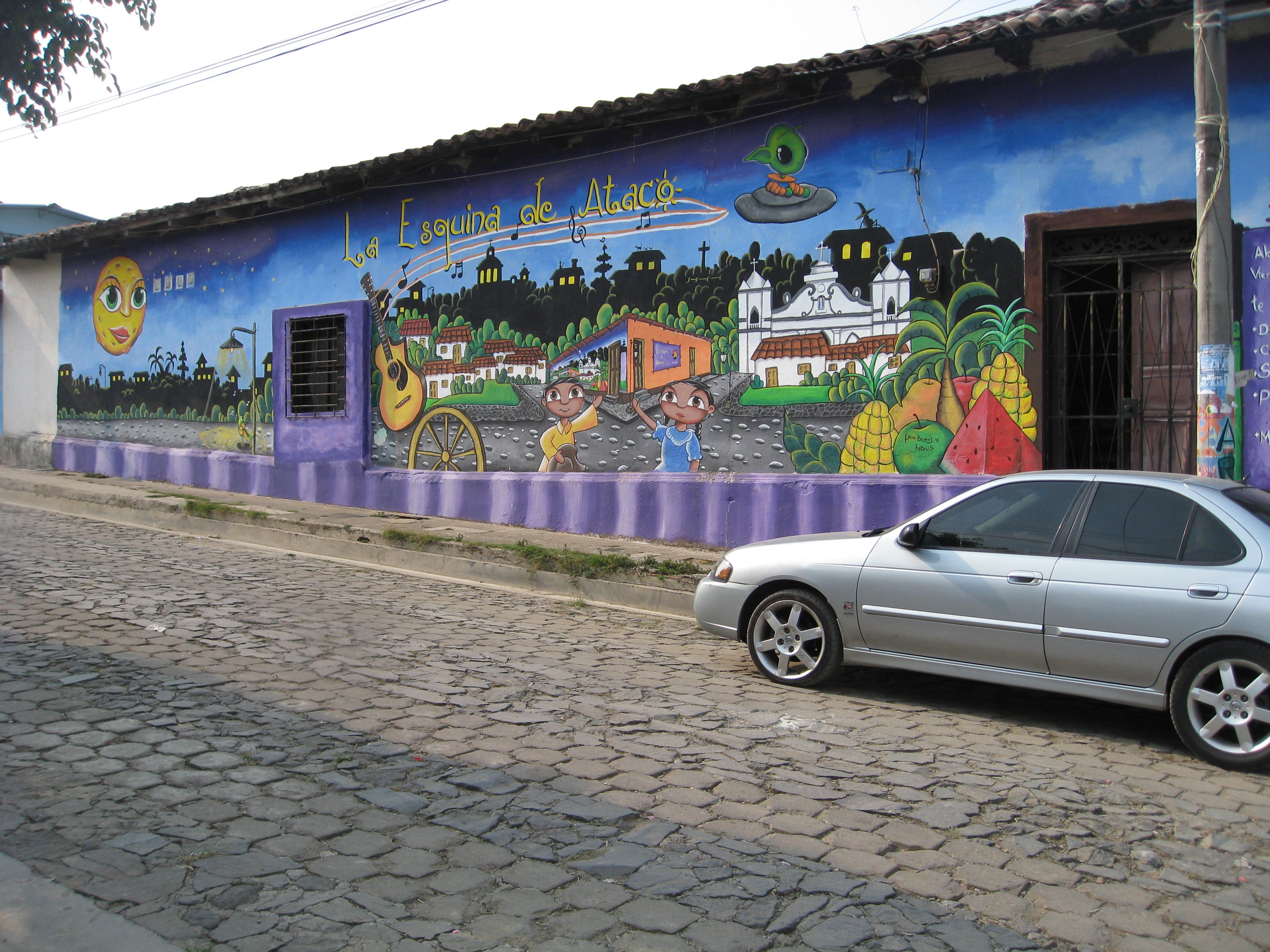
La Esquina de Ataco

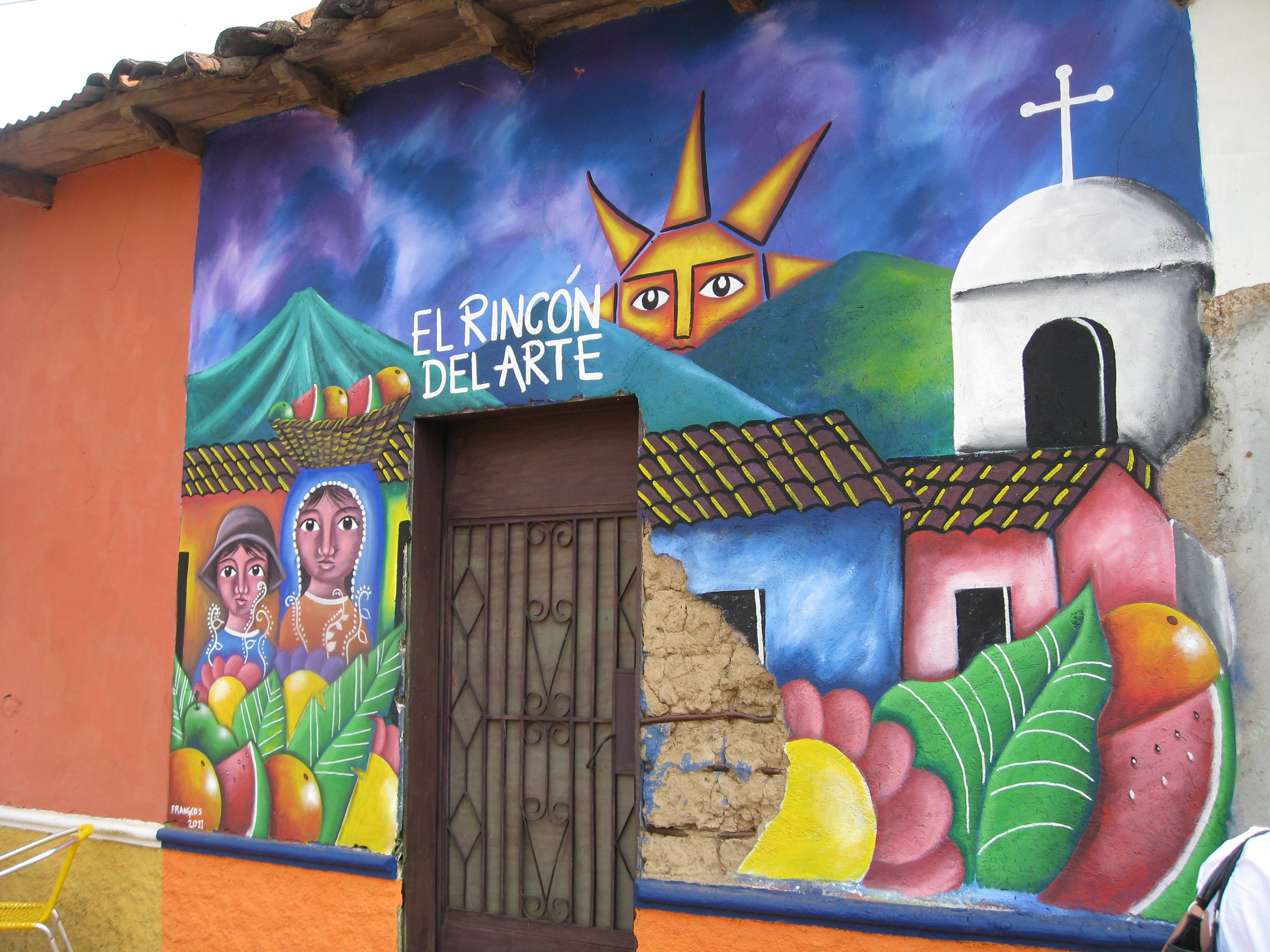
Rincon del Arte

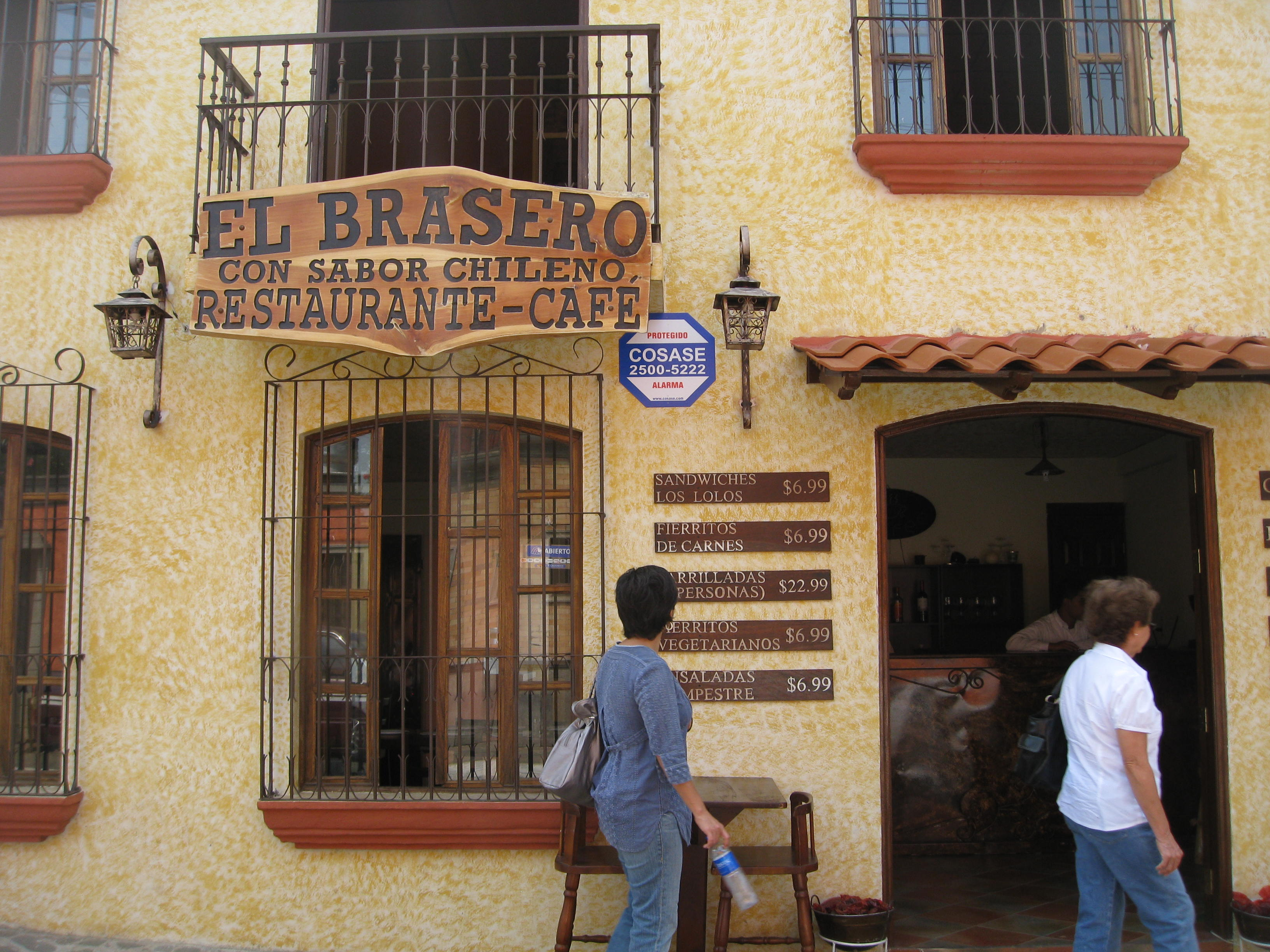
Chilean Restaurant

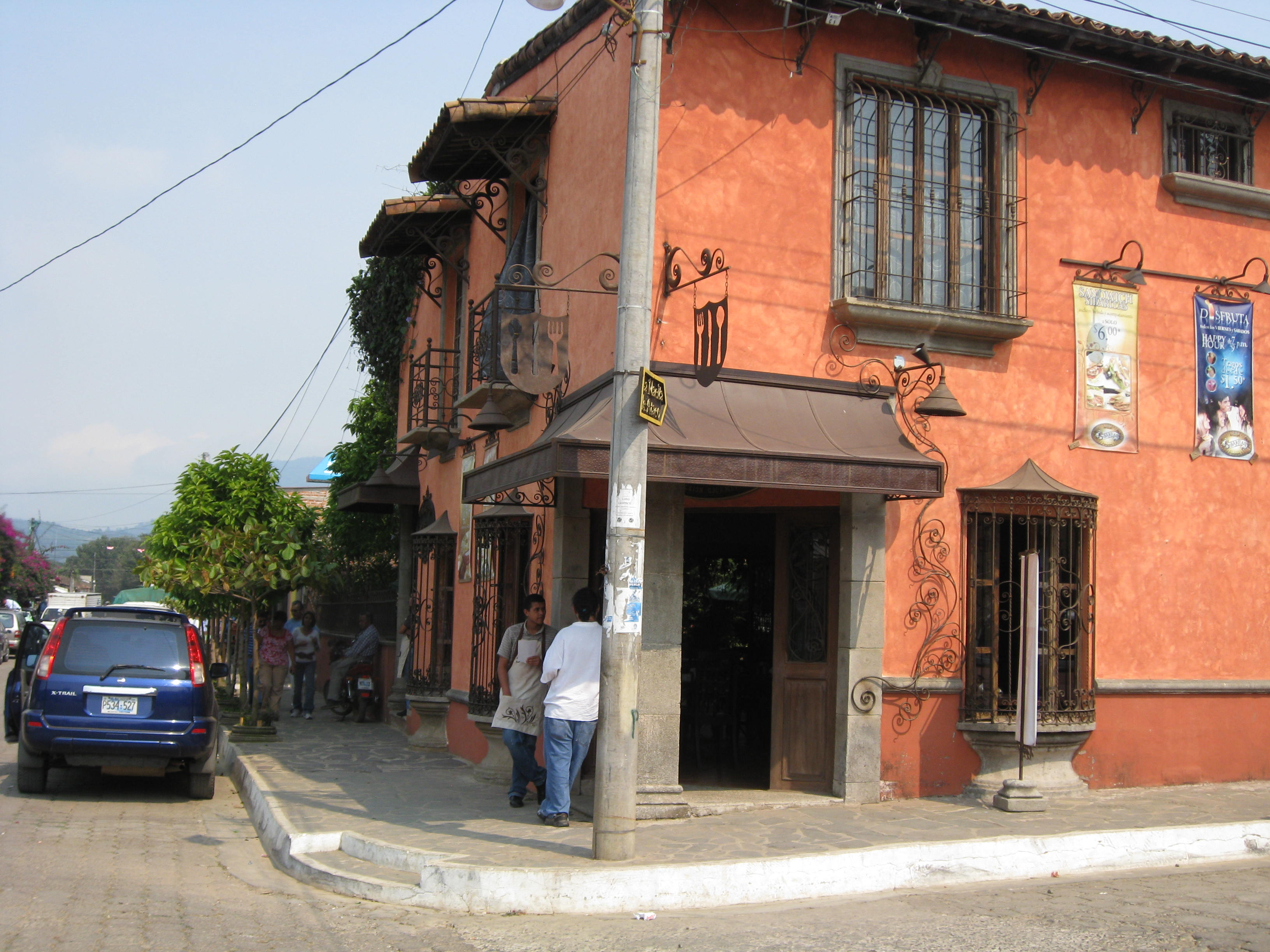

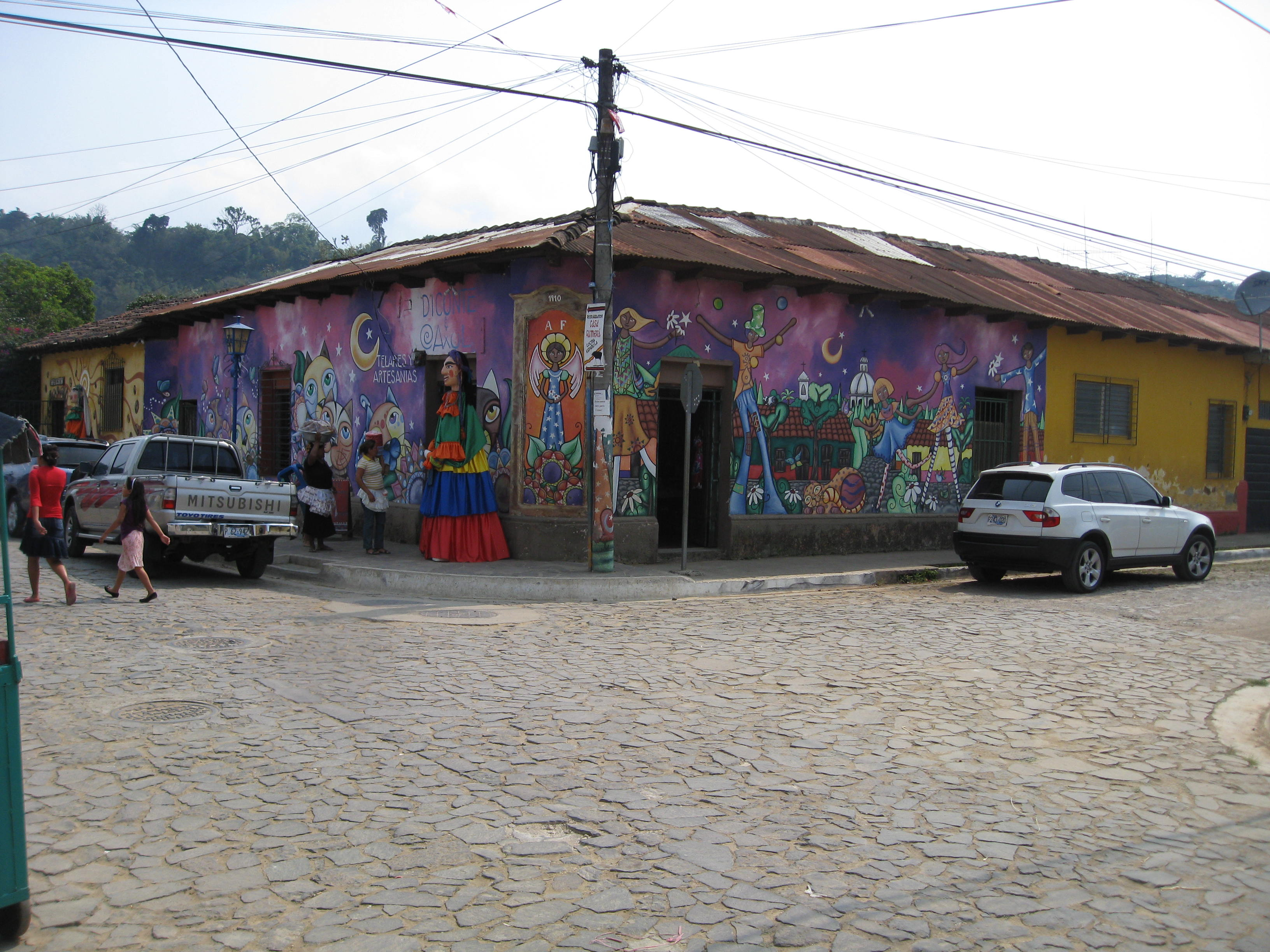
Diconte y Axul

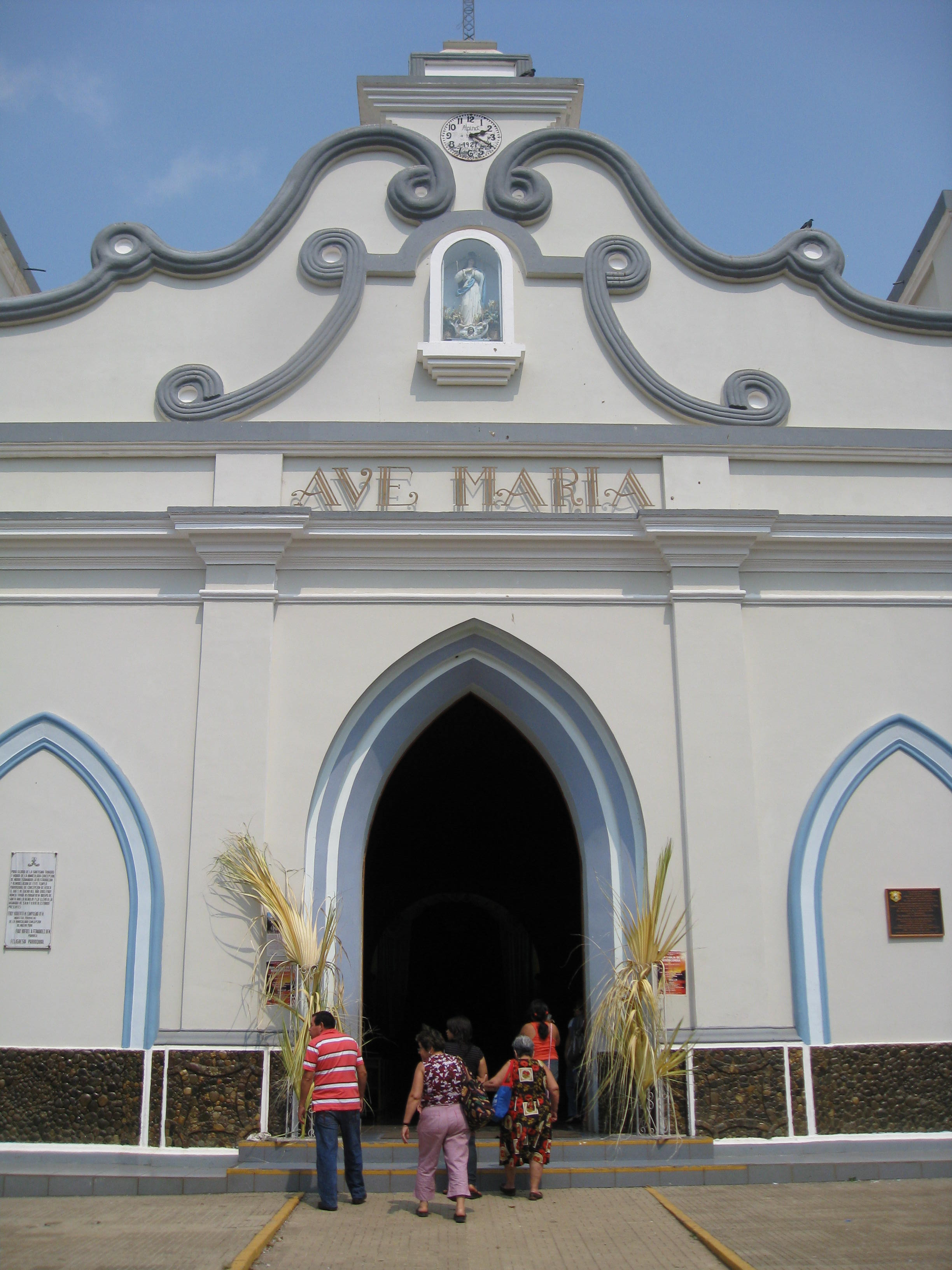
Ave Maria Cathedral

Ataco has started its tourism business in the late 2004. Prior to that the most visited colonial village was Apaneca, a village 20 minutes away from Ataco. After people realized Ataco has more opportunities and that it's a very cheerful village, people starting investing in Ataco. Even though Ataco did not win first place in the Pueblos Vivos contest it is still preferred by many local and international tourists.

=== Lever looms ===
Leaver looms were reintroduced to the area and can see and appreciate the art of fabric making in some local craft shops.

== Climate ==
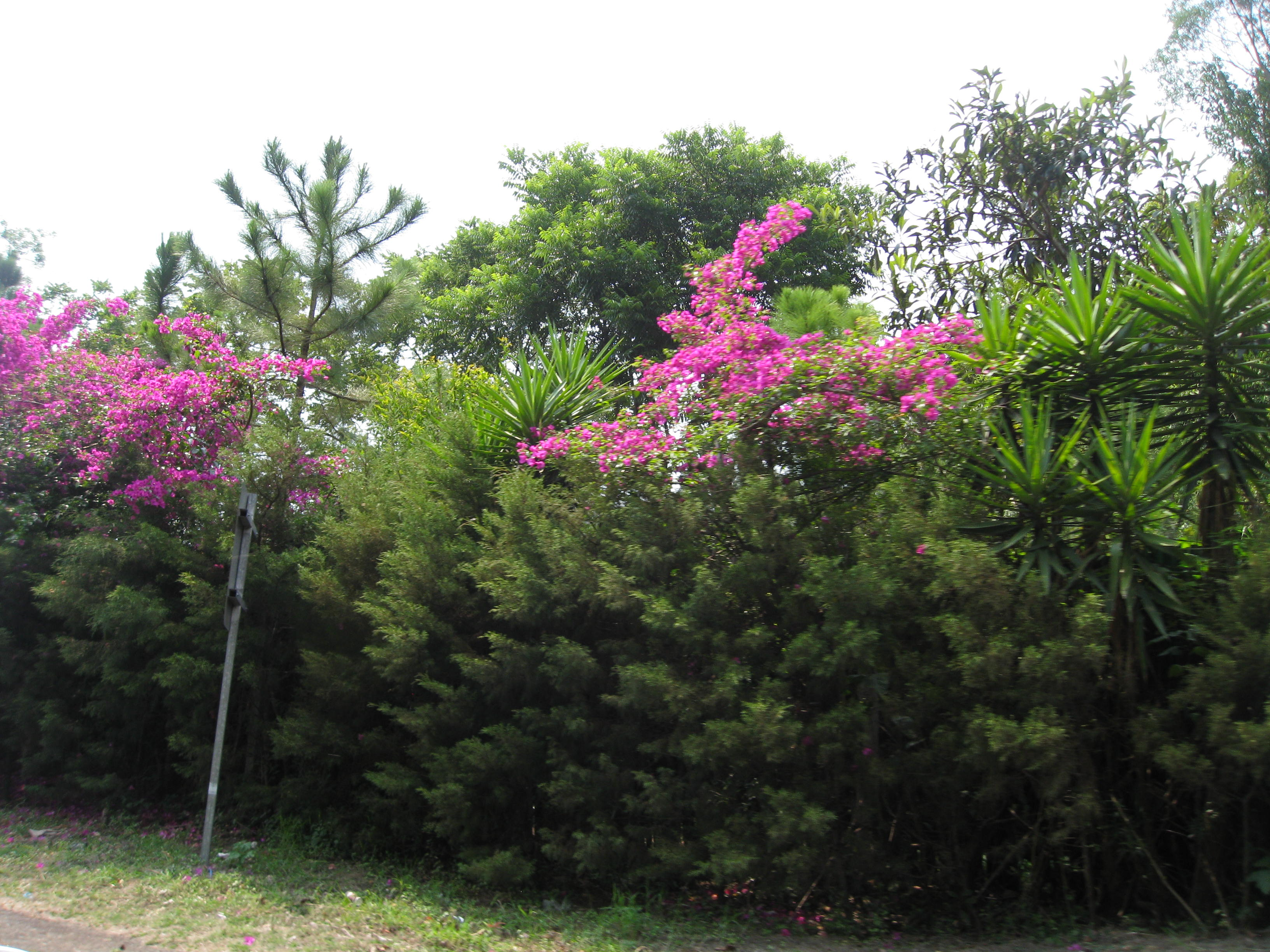
The Cool Climate allows many plants to develop and reproduce fast

Ataco experiences a subtropical highland climate. Ataco's high elevation gives the area one of the nicest climate ranges in El Salvador. Temperatures never go above 23 °C (73 °F) and always stay cool during the night. Sometimes it can be very chilly. The lowest temperature recorded was 4 °C (40 °F) which occurred during a cold front in November 2010. The fact that the city receives a lot of precipitation, and that the temperature is relatively cool but not cold, makes the place ideal for plants of many types to grow; it is usual to see a low of flowers, pine trees, and "veraneras" in Concepcion de Ataco and in the surrounding areas. Because the town is located on a mountain the sidewalks are designed to be really high from the street, because when there is heavy rain all the runoff from the mountain could flood the road with a couple of inches. The month with the highest rainfall is July with 316 millimeters of rain (13 inches). The average coolest months of the year are October and November with temperatures as low as 10 °C (50 °F) (due to a high presence of wind during this period of year).

Climate data for Concepcion de Ataco
Month	Jan	Feb	Mar	Apr	May	Jun	Jul	Aug	Sep	Oct	Nov	Dec	Year
Mean daily maximum °C (°F)	19.3 (66.7)	20.6 (69.1)	23.3 (73.9)	23.2 (73.8)	22.7 (72.9)	21.6 (70.9)	21.6 (70.9)	21.6 (70.9)	20.9 (69.6)	20.0 (68.0)	19.2 (66.6)	18.9 (66.0)	20.5 (68.9)
Daily mean °C (°F)	14.7 (58.5)	15.3 (59.5)	17.0 (62.6)	17.7 (63.9)	17.9 (64.2)	17.2 (63.0)	17.1 (62.8)	17.1 (62.8)	16.9 (62.4)	16.2 (61.2)	15.2 (59.4)	14.7 (58.5)	16.0 (60.8)
Mean daily minimum °C (°F)	10.8 (51.4)	11.6 (52.9)	12.8 (55.0)	13.9 (57.0)	14.6 (58.3)	14.3 (57.7)	14.0 (57.2)	14.0 (57.2)	14.2 (57.6)	13.6 (56.5)	11.7 (53.1)	10.9 (51.6)	12.5 (54.5)
Record low °C (°F)	6.0 (42.8)	5.6 (42.1)	8.0 (46.4)	10.0 (50.0)	10.0 (50.0)	10.0 (50.0)	10.0 (50.0)	10.0 (50.0)	9.4 (48.9)	5.3 (41.5)	4.9 (40.8)	7.1 (44.8)	7.3 (45.1)
Average precipitation mm (inches)	5.0 (0.20)	2.0 (0.08)	9.0 (0.35)	36.0 (1.42)	152.0 (5.98)	292.0 (11.50)	316.0 (12.44)	311.0 (12.24)	348.0 (13.70)	217.0 (8.54)	36.0 (1.42)	10.0 (0.39)	1,734 (68.3)
Source: http://www.yr.no/;

== Transportation ==
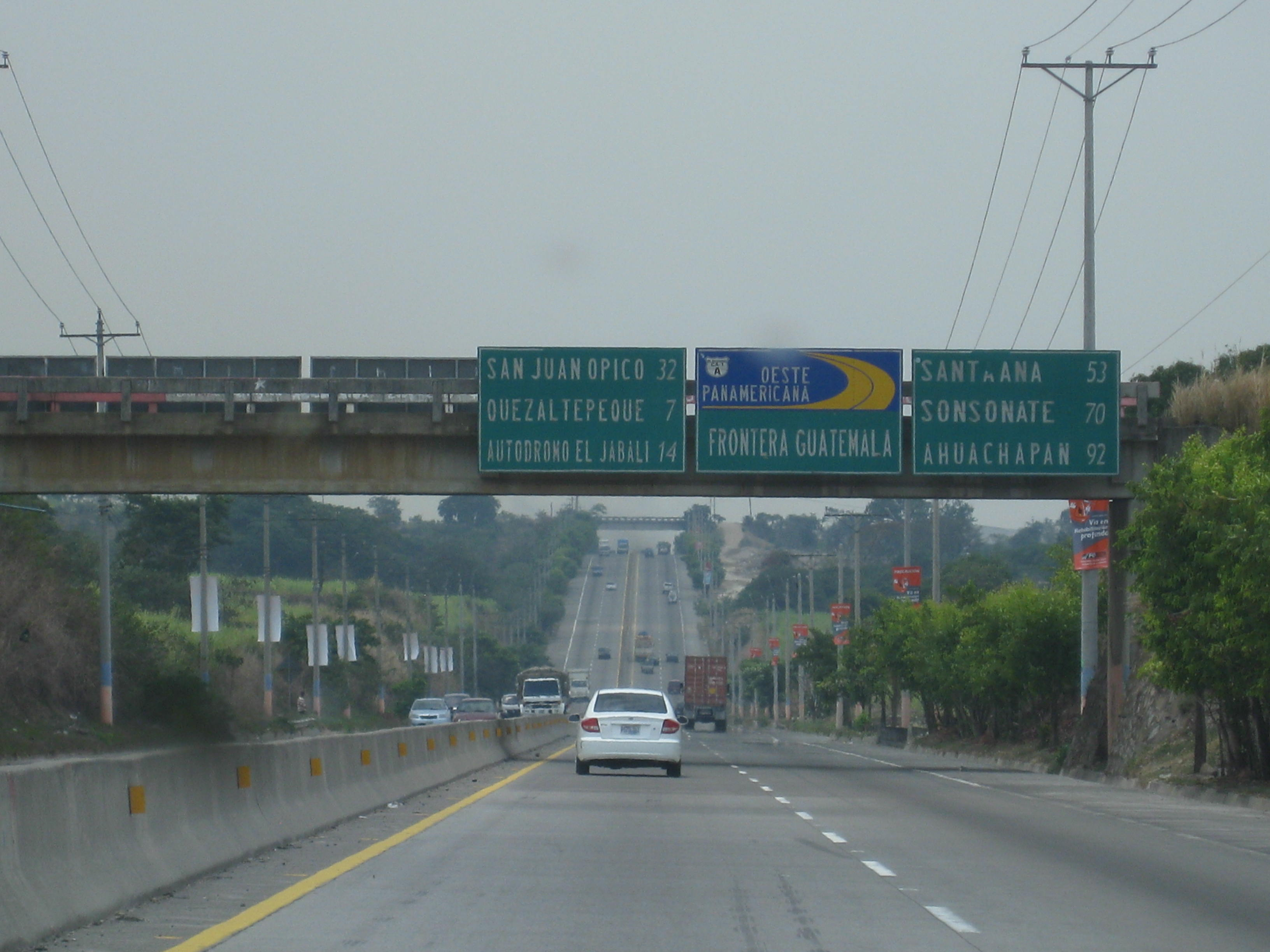
PanAmerican CA-1 West

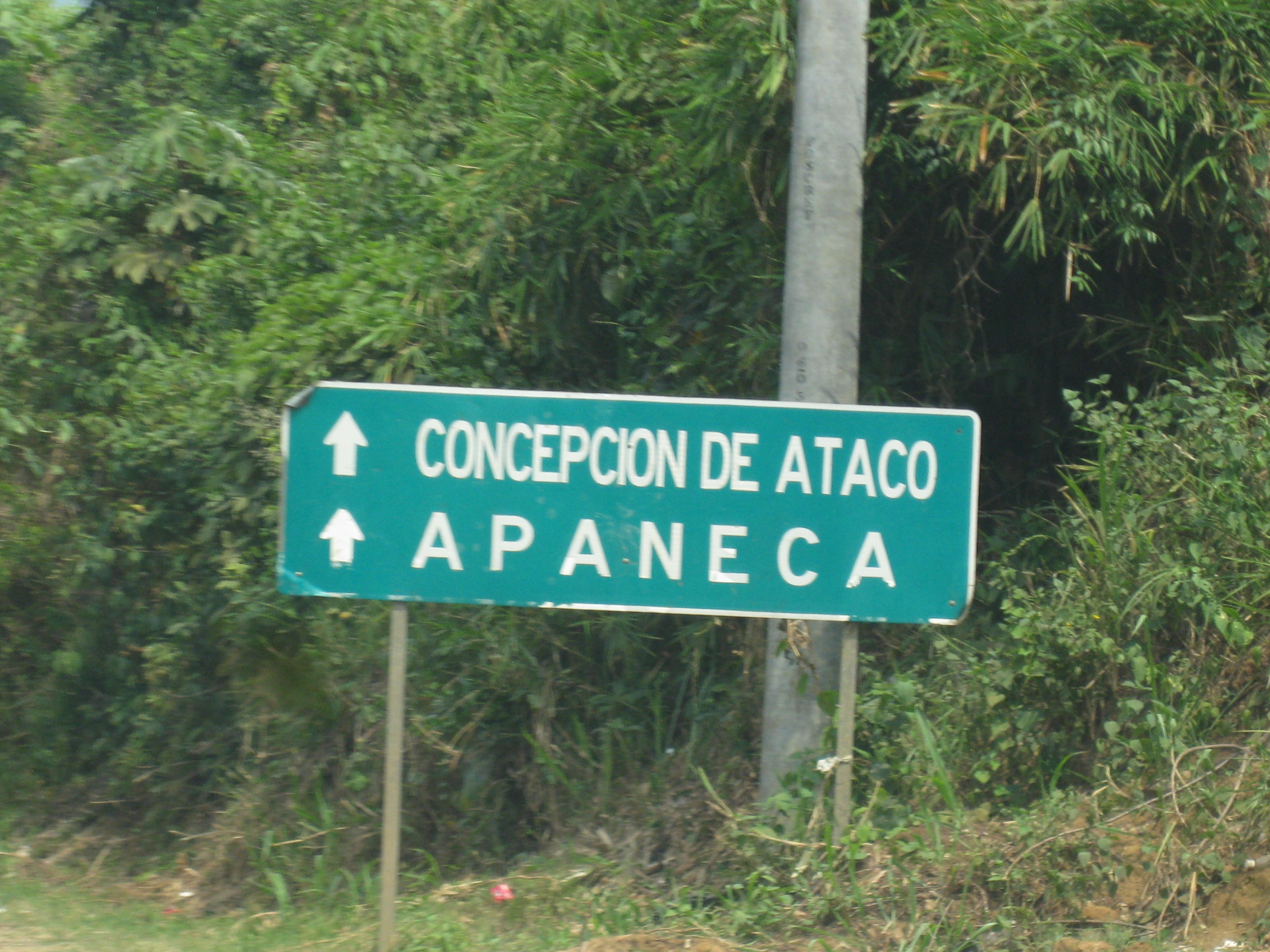
Ataco Sign on the CA-8

Access by paved road that connects with Ahuachapán and Sonsonate (CA-8). There are regular buses that arrive at the entrance of the village, from Sonsonate and Ahuachapán. The (CA-8) is a small rural highway with two lanes, the road connects Ataco with Apaneca too and San Salvador. In order to take the CA-8 there are different highways depending on what part of the country you can take the RN-13 if you are coming from Santa Ana or Chalchuapa (if you are coming form the eastern part of Santa Ana the nearest highways is the RN-12), from Acajutla one can take the CA-2 and then the RN-15 and connect to the CA-8 near Apaneca a few kilometers away from Ataco. If coming from San Salvador or anywhere else in the country the highway that connects to the area is the CA-1 (Pan-American Highway)

== Security ==
Ataco and its surroundings are known for their high safety levels. Even though there is no danger at all nor the presence of any type of violence, Politur (Tourism Police) is present in the area to not only maximize the safety levels, but to orient those who are lost, and to help out with any trouble one has.

== See also ==
- Ahuachapan, Ahuachapan
- Ahuachapan Department
- Santa Ana, El Salvador
- Apaneca
- San Salvador
- Antiguo Cuscatlan
- El Pital
- La Palma, Chalatenango
