= San Lorenzo, Ahuachapán =

San Lorenzo
- District
- Location in El Salvador
- Coordinates: 14°2′N 89°47′W
- Country: El Salvador
- Department: Ahuachapán
- Municipality: Ahuachapán Norte
- Elevation: 1,683 ft (513 m)

Population (2024)
  - District: 11,132
  - Rank: 123rd in El Salvador
  - Urban: 4,813
  - Rural: 6,319

San Lorenzo is a district in the Ahuachapán Department of El Salvador.

San Lorenzo is a town of 9,194 citizens, located 7 km north of Atiquizaya city. San Lorenzo is on the border with Guatemala. The closest Guatemalan city to San Lorenzo is Esmeralda City and Jerez of department of Jutiapa.

San Lorenzo is well known in Western El Salvador for its several rivers, the San Antonio and Rio Paz, which attract Salvadoran tourists during Christmas and New Year holidays.

On December 20, 2006, an earthquake struck San Lorenzo, destroying 432 houses. In total, 1,038 houses were affected.
