= El Refugio, El Salvador =

El Refugio
- District
- Location in El Salvador
- Coordinates: 13°58′30″N 89°42′26″W
- Country: El Salvador
- Department: Ahuachapán
- Municipality: Ahuachapán Norte

Area
  - District: 4.25 sq mi (11.01 km^{2})
- Elevation: 1,180 ft (360 m)

Population (2024)
  - District: 9,827
  - Rank: 137th in El Salvador
  - Urban: 9,134
  - Rural: 693

El Refugio ("The Refuge") is a district in the Ahuachapán Department of El Salvador.
