= Tacuba =

- District
- Location in El Salvador
- Coordinates: 13°54′N 89°56′W
- Country: El Salvador
- Department: Ahuachapán
- Municipality: Ahuachapán Centro
- Elevation: 2,293 ft (699 m)

Population (2024)
  - District: 31,208
  - Estimate (2026): 32,253
  - Rank: 46th in El Salvador
  - Urban: 17,848
  - Rural: 13,360

Tacuba is a district in the Ahuachapán Department of El Salvador.

== Church Of Tacuba ==
It is located in Villa of Tacuba. It is head of the municipality of the same name in the department of Ahuachapán, at about 14 kilometers of the city of Ahuachapán and at 700 meters over the sea level. It was built in the 16th century or at the beginning of the 17th century by the officer Juan Clemente and his son Juan.

Its facade is of wooden type and it has a Baroque style with a front of three bodies. The interior is decorated with four Solomon columns and two arched niches in the half body. The niches house images of entablature; it also possesses an opening for the illumination of the interior. The superior body is decorated with Solomon columns, where it can be appreciated, since it was partially destroyed by the earthquake of 1773. It happened in Guatemala, and created destruction in the city of Antigua, Guatemala.

Of the church itself, only the facade of a lateral wall and a section of the outer wall remain. There are also two embedded chapels. This description is previous to the damage produced by the earthquake of June 19, 1982. A beautiful baptism puddle of sculpted stone is still conserved. In the data of “Statistical Population and their resources” of 1858, there is a comment: “there is a beautiful ruined temple of calicanto and regular convent of pope”. There is a document of 1769, in which the ordinary mayor, Don Mateo Ramirez, describes the construction of the church. He mentions that Tacuba was founded by the pipiles and was called Tacupán, a Nahuatl word meaning “patio" or "ball game field”.
