= Apaneca =

- District
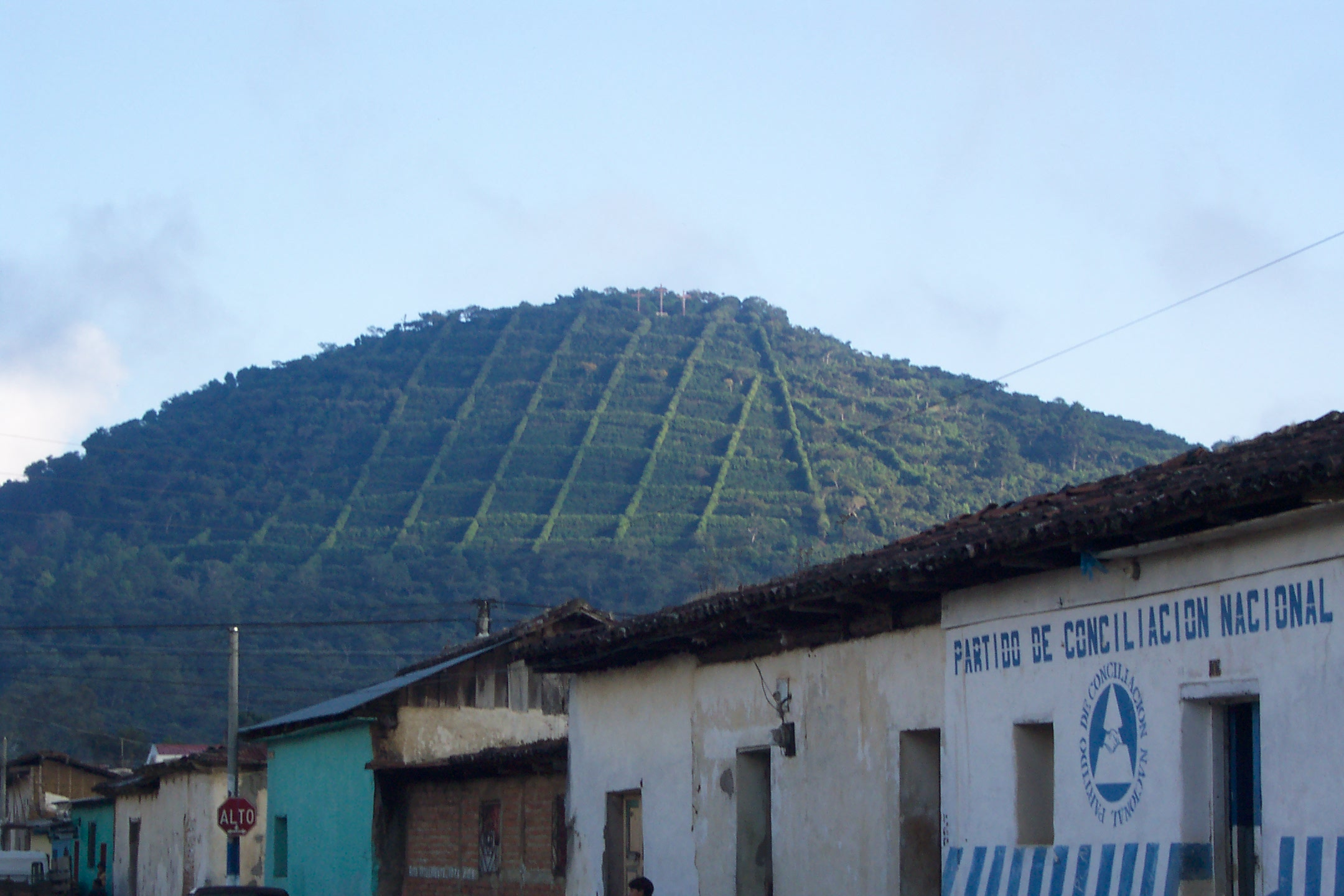

- Location in El Salvador
- Coordinates: 13°51′N 89°48′W
- Country: El Salvador
- Department: Ahuachapán
- Municipality: Ahuachapán Centro

Area
  - District: 17.42 sq mi (45.13 km^{2})

Population (2024)
  - District: 9,436
  - Rank: 143rd in El Salvador
  - Urban: 6,866
  - Rural: 2,570

Apaneca is a district in the Ahuachapán Department of El Salvador. The name means river of the wind in Nahuatl.

It has an area of 45.13 square kilometers. Its population is of 8,597 inhabitants (Estimated 2006). The municipality is divided in 7 communities:

- El Saltillal
- Palo Verde
- Quezalapa
- San Ramoncito
- Taltapanca
- Tizapa
- Tulapa

== Towns ==
- Santa Leticia

== See also ==
- Concepcion de Ataco
- La Palma
- Antiguo Cuscatlan
- Ahuachapan, El Salvador
