= Atiquizaya =

- District
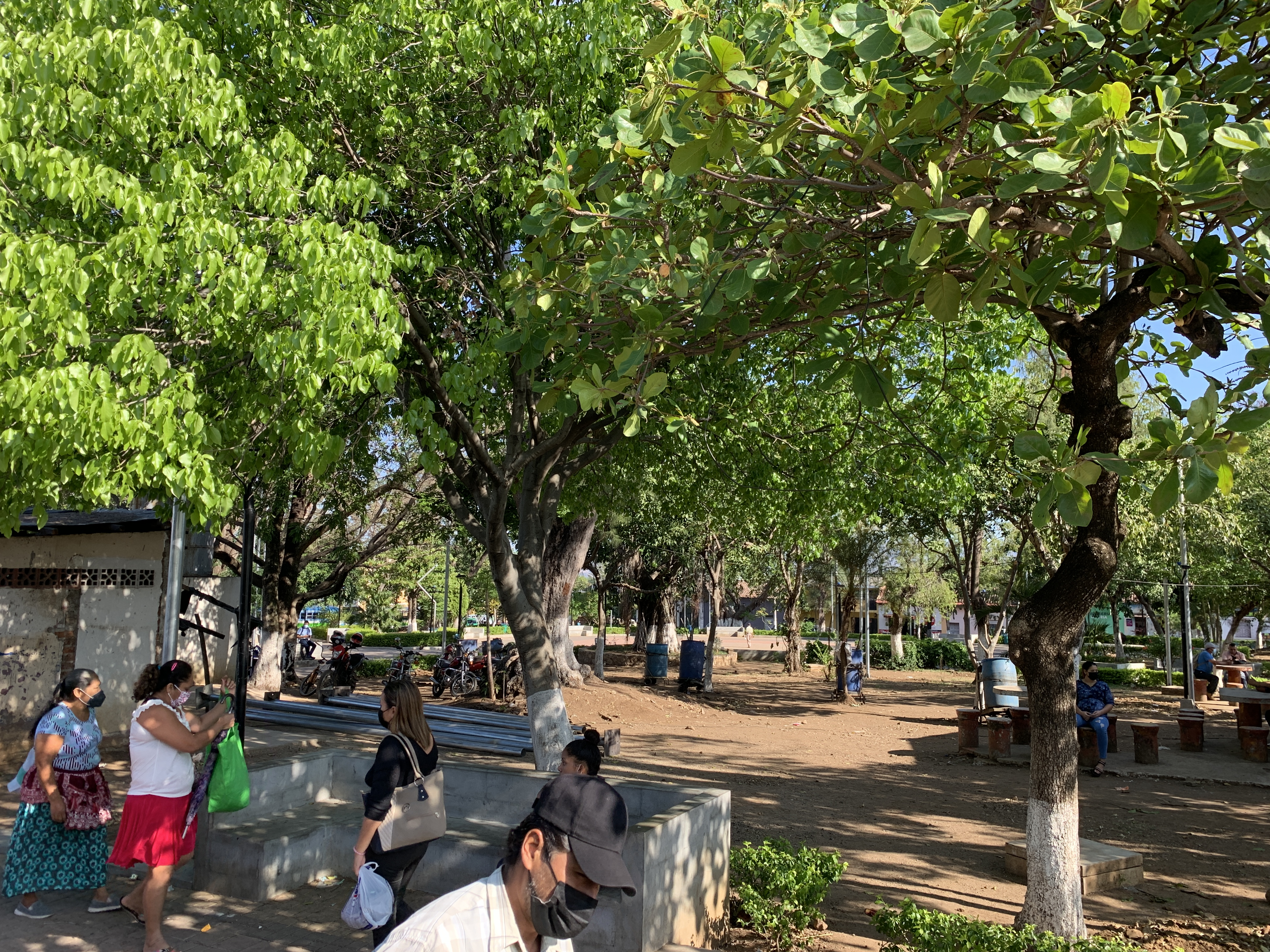

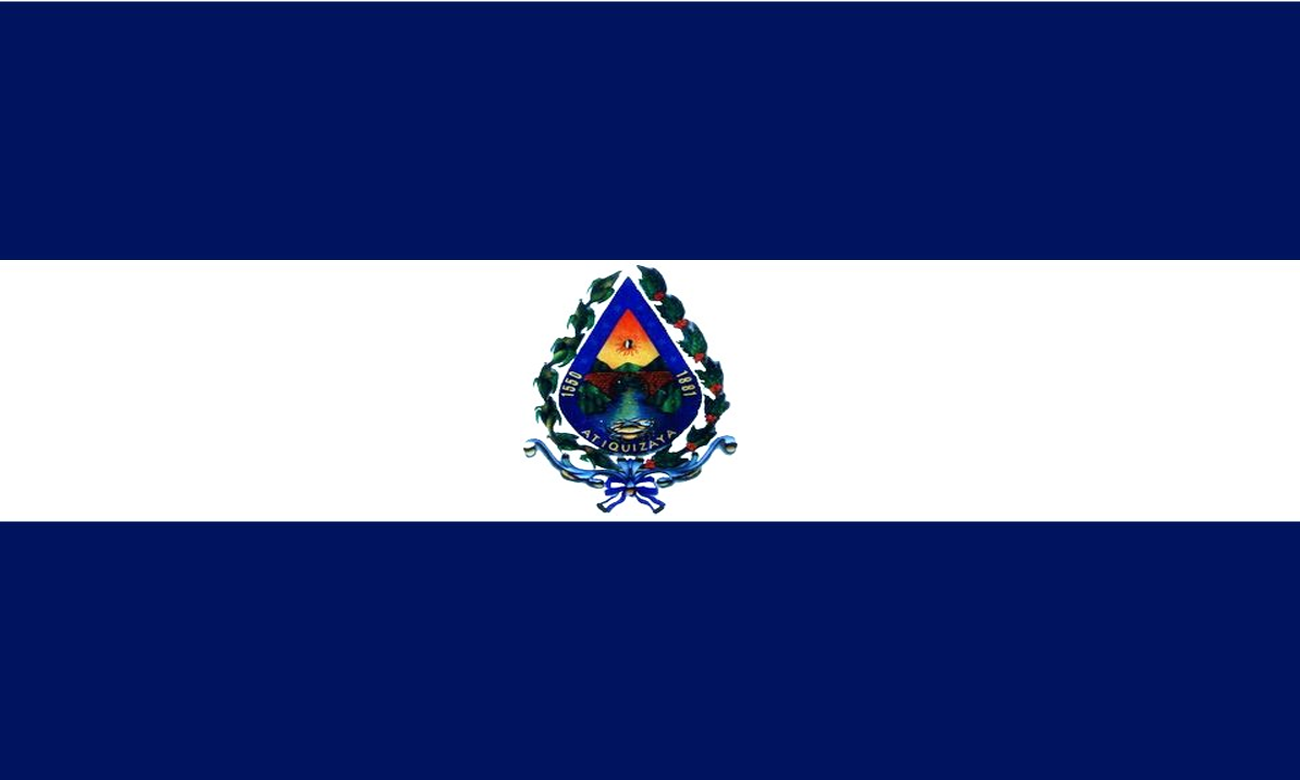
- Flag

- Location in El Salvador
- Coordinates: 13°58′N 89°45′W
- Country: El Salvador
- Department: Ahuachapán
- Municipality: Ahuachapán Norte

Area
  - District: 25.73 sq mi (66.64 km^{2})

Population (2024)
  - District: 34,209
  - Rank: 42nd in El Salvador
  - Urban: 29,485
  - Rural: 4,724

Atiquizaya is a district in the Ahuachapán Department of El Salvador.

It covers an area of 66.64 km^{2} and as of 2007 has a population of 33,587.

== Communities ==
It is divided into the following communities:

El Chayal, Salitrero, Tapacún, Tortuguero, El Iscaquilío, Joya del Plantanar, Joya del Zapote, La Esperanza, Loma de Alarcón, Pepenance, San Juan El Espino, Santa Rita, Rincón Grande y Zunca.

== Sports ==
The local football club is named C.D. Huracán and it currently plays in the Salvadoran Third Division.
