= Ahuachapán Department =

Department of El Salvador

Ahuachapán
- Department
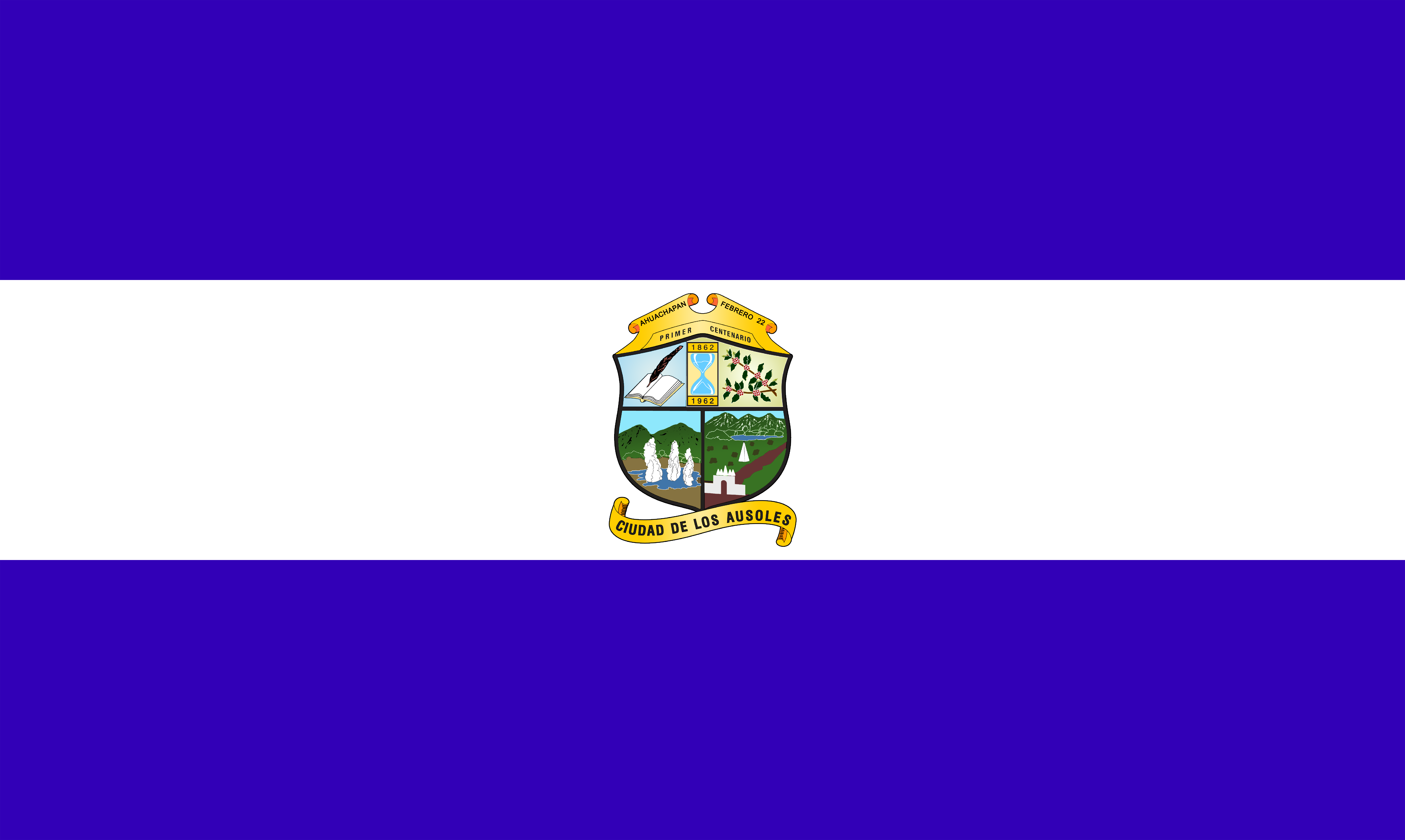
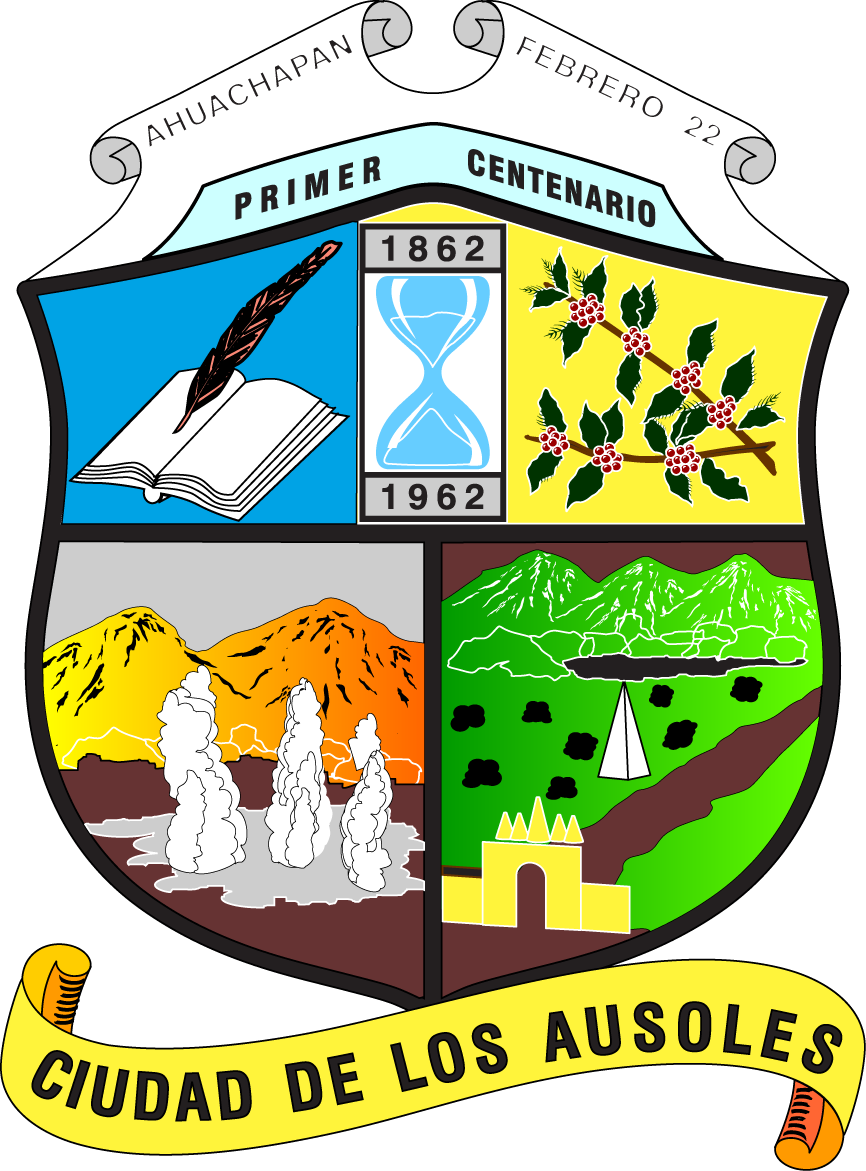
- Flag Coat of arms

- Location within El Salvador
- Coordinates: 13°52′01″N 89°53′31″W
- Country: El Salvador
- Established: 1869
- Capital: Ahuachapán

Area
  - Total: 1,239.6 km^{2} (478.6 sq mi)
  - Rank: Ranked 8th

Population (2013)
  - Total: 333,406
  - Rank: Ranked 7th
  - Density: 268.96/km^{2} (696.61/sq mi)
- Time zone: UTC−6 (CST)
- ISO 3166 code: SV-AH

Ahuachapán (Spanish pronunciation: [awatʃaˈpan]) is a department of El Salvador in the west of the country. The capital is Ahuachapán. In the south, it has the Apaneca-Ilamatepec Range and the Cerro Grande de Apaneca (Apaneca Grand Hill). It has a population of over 360,000 people. The Ahuachapán Department was created by the Legislative Decree of February 9, 1869, under the administration of Francisco Dueñas.

== Municipalities ==
1. Ahuachapán Centro
2. Ahuachapán Norte
3. Ahuachapán Sur

== Districts ==
1. Ahuachapán
2. Apaneca
3. Atiquizaya
4. Concepción de Ataco
5. El Refugio
6. Guaymango
7. Jujutla
8. San Francisco Menéndez
9. San Lorenzo
10. San Pedro Puxtla
11. Tacuba
12. Turín
