= Boggs (surname) =

Boggs is a surname. Notable people with the surname include:

- Brandon Boggs (born 1983), American baseball left fielder for the Texas Rangers and Milwaukee Brewers
- Brent Boggs (born 1955), American Democratic politician, member of the West Virginia House of Delegates (from 1997)
- Carol L. Boggs (born 1952), American biologist
- Carroll C. Boggs (1844–1923), American jurist
- Charles S. Boggs (1811–1888), United States Navy admiral
- Danny Julian Boggs (born 1944), American judge
- David Boggs (1950–2022), American electrical and radio engineer, co-inventor of the Ethernet technology
- David Ray Boggs (born 1943), American stock car racing driver
- Dock Boggs, (1898–1971) American banjo player and singer
- Eli Boggs, American pirate in the 19th century
- Elizabeth Monroe Boggs (1913–1996), founder of the National Association for Retarded Children (Arc of the United States)
- Francis Boggs (1870–1911), American stage actor and pioneer silent film director
- Gail Boggs (born 1951), American actress
- George Arthur Boggs (1891–1968), Canadian politician, member of the Nova Scotia House of Assembly (1953–1956)
- Gil Boggs, artistic director of Colorado Ballet (from 2006)
- Grace Lee Boggs (1915–2015), American social activist
- Hale Boggs (Thomas Hale Boggs Sr.; 1914–1973), U.S. Congressman (1962–1973)
- Hampton E. Boggs (1921–1953), American fighter pilot
- Haskell Boggs (1909–2003), American cinematographer
- Henrietta Boggs (1918–2020), Costa Rican-American author, journalist, and activist, wife of the President of Costa Rica José Figueres Ferrer, First Lady of Costa Rica (1948–1949)
- Henry C. Boggs (1820–1898), farmer, businessman and banker who was prominent in Lake County, California
- J. Caleb Boggs (1909–1993), American Republican politician who served as the state of Delaware's Governor, US Representative and US Senator
- J. S. G. Boggs (1955–2017), artist
- James Boggs (disambiguation), several people
- Jean Sutherland Boggs (1922–2014), Canadian art historian
- Kristin Boggs, American politician, member of the Ohio House of Representatives (from 2016)
- Larry Boggs (born 1946), American politician, member of the Oklahoma Senate (from 2012)
- Lilburn Boggs (1796–1860), 6th Governor of Missouri from 1836 to 1840
- Lindy Boggs (1916–2013), American congresswoman, 1973–1991
- Lucinda Pearl Boggs (1874–1931), American psychologist and philosopher
- Lynette Boggs (born 1963), American Republican politician, Miss Oregon 1989, member of the Las Vegas City Council (1999–2004) and the Clark County Commission (2004–2006)
- Mark Boggs (born 1964), American football player
- Mary Boggs (also known as Mary Ross Boggs and Mary Ross Townley; 1920–2002), American muralist and textbook author
- Michael Boggs (disambiguation), several people
- Mitchell Boggs (born 1984), American baseball pitcher
- Paula Boggs (born 1959), American philanthropist, public speaker, and musician
- Phil Boggs (Phillip George Boggs; 1949–1990), American Olympic diver
- Ray Boggs (1904–1989), American baseball pitcher for the Boston Braves
- Redd Boggs (1921–1996), American science fiction fanzine writer
- Richard Boggs (1933–2003), American neurologist, convicted murderer
- Ross Boggs (1938–2025), American Democratic politician, member of the Ohio House of Representatives (1983–1999)
- Samuel Whittemore Boggs (1889–1954), American geographer and cartographer who developed the Boggs eumorphic projection
- Stanley Boggs (1910–1991) American archaeologist
- Taylor Boggs (born 1987), American football center
- Tex Boggs (born 1938), American politician, member of the Wyoming Senate (1999–2006), President of Western Wyoming Community College
- Thomas Boggs (1944–2008), American restaurateur and musician, member of the rock band the Box Tops
- Thomas Hale Boggs Jr. (1941–2014), American attorney and lobbyist
- Thomas Oliver Boggs (1824–1894), Colorado pioneer and founder of Boggsville, Colorado
- Tom Boggs (poet) (1905–1952), American poet, editor, and novelist
- Tommy Boggs (Thomas Winton Boggs; 1955–2022), American baseball pitcher for Texas Rangers and Atlanta Braves
- Wade Boggs (born 1958), former Major League Baseball third baseman
- William Boggs (disambiguation), several people
- William Benton Boggs (1854–1922), American politician
- Winthrop Smillie Boggs (1902–1974), American philatelist
- Zak Boggs (born 1986), American soccer player

== Fictional characters ==
- Randall Boggs, in the 2001 animated film Monsters, Inc. and in its 2013 prequel Monsters University

== See also ==
- Bogs (name), given name and surname
