= Bog (disambiguation) =

Bog is a wetland of mosses or lichens over waterlogged peat.

Bog or Bogs may also refer to:

== Culture ==
- Bog (album), 1999 album by the Croatian alternative rock band Pips, Chips & Videoclips
- Bog (film), 1983 Gloria DeHaven film
- Monsters in the animated film Disney Princess: Enchanted Journey
- The Bog, 1990 song by Bigod 20
- Emperor Bog, a character in the animated television series Butt-Ugly Martians

== Places ==
- Bog, Westmoreland, Jamaica, a settlement
- Bog, Khash, a village in Sistan and Baluchestan Province, Iran
- Bog-i Ston, a village in the Tashkent province of Uzbekistan
- Bog Meadows, an area on the outskirts of west Belfast, Northern Ireland
- Bog River, a river in New York state
- Bog Walk, a town in the parish of Saint Catherine, Jamaica
- The Bog, a former mining village in Shropshire, England
- Bognor Regis railway station

== Acronyms ==
- Bank of Ghana, the central bank of Ghana
- British Organic Geochemical Society, an organisation that aims to promote, exchange and discuss all aspects of organic geochemistry
- El Dorado International Airport, international airport at Bogotá, Colombia, IATA code BOG
- Board of Governors
- break of gauge

== Other uses ==
- Bog, the word for God in most Slavic languages. (Cyrillic script: Бог; Czech: Bůh; Polish: Bóg; Slovak: Boh).
  - Croatian informal greeting, similar to German Grüß Gott
  - Slang for "God" in A Clockwork Orange by Anthony Burgess
- Paal Bog (1919–2002), Norwegian economist, civil servant and diplomat
- Bogs (name), includes a list of people and fictional characters with the given name and surname
- British English colloquialism for toilet
  - Tree bog, a type of pit latrine
- Australian slang for various types of putty used as a filling material in construction, vehicle body repair, etc.

== See also ==
- Bog pine, common name for two tree species
- Boggs (disambiguation)
