= Tazumal =

Archaeological site in El Salvador

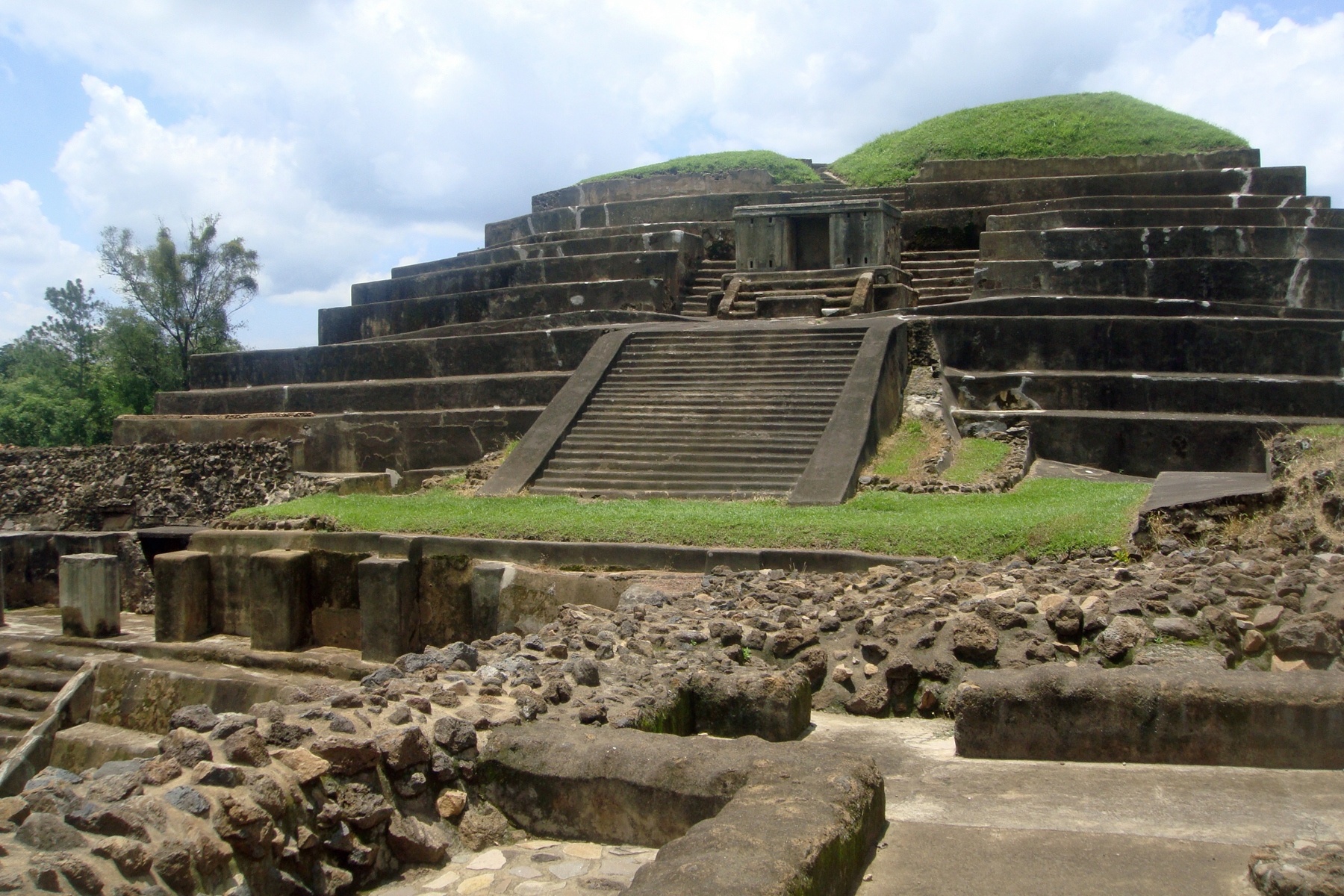
- View of Structure B1-1 from B1-2

- Location of the site Tazumal (El Salvador)
- 13°58′46″N 89°40′27″W
- Periods: Preclassic to Late Postclassic
- Cultures: Mesoamerican Preclassic, Maya Civilization, Ch'orti'
- Location: Santa Ana Department, El Salvador

Tazumal (/täsuːˈmäl/) is a pre-Columbian archeological site and architectural complex located within the archeological zone of Chalchuapa, in western El Salvador. The complex forms part of the remains of the ancient Mesoamerican city of Chalchuapa and occupies the southern portion of the zone. Archaeologist Stanley Boggs excavated and restored the site during the 1940s and 1950s.

Archaeological investigations indicate that Tazumal was occupied from the Classic period through the Postclassic and participated in long-distance exchange networks extending to central Mexico, the northern Yucatán Peninsula and lower Central America. Metallurgical artifacts recovered from the complex date to the 8th century AD and represent some of the earliest documented evidence of metalworking in Mesoamerica.

== Location ==
Tazumal is located within the municipality of Chalchuapa in the department of Santa Ana, within the Río Paz drainage basin. The site lies at an elevation of 720 meters (2,360 ft) above mean sea level. It is situated approximately 120 kilometers (75 mi) from the contemporary Maya city of Kaminaljuyu and 4 kilometers (2.5 mi) southwest of the small Late Classic site of Alumulunga.

== History ==
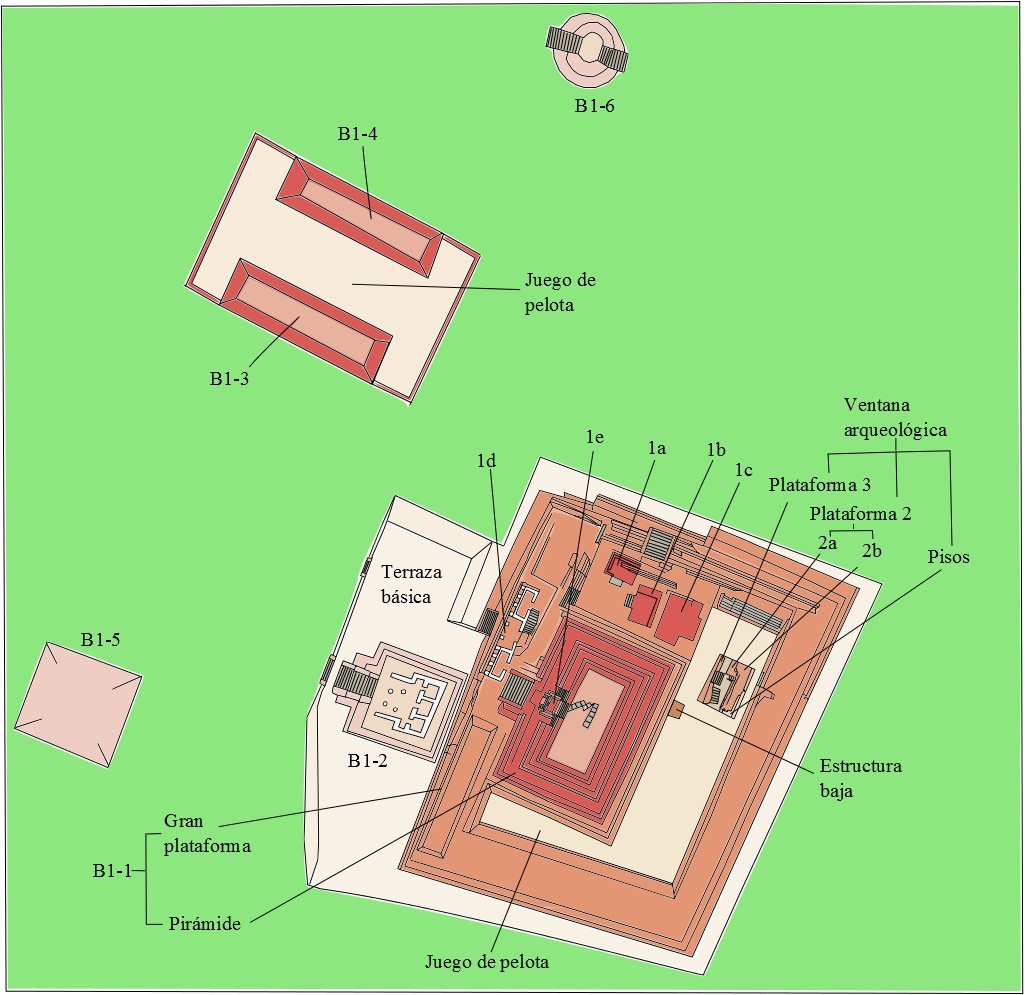
Structures of Tazumal

Chalchuapa was inhabited since the Preclassic period, when massive construction activity took place. Around the boundary between the end of the Late Preclassic and the start of the Early Classic, construction at Tazumal was interrupted by the eruption of the Ilopango volcano, some 75 kilometres (47 mi) to the east of the city. This eruption caused a hiatus in construction activity at Tazumal that may have lasted several generations. Activity resumed during the Early to Middle Classic (c. AD 250–650) although the city never fully recovered to its Preclassic levels of activity. The Tazumal complex came closest to matching the enormous structures of the Preclassic period.

The principal structures of the Tazumal group date to the Classic period (c. AD 250–900) of Mesoamerican chronology. By the Late Classic (c. AD 600–900) Tazumal was an important ceremonial complex. Construction activity is evident from the Early Classic through to the Middle Classic (c. AD 400–600). At this time Tazumal had important links with the Maya city of Kaminaljuyu in the Valley of Guatemala, which acted to extend the influence of the powerful central Mexican city of Teotihuacan into the Pacific coastal areas of Guatemala and El Salvador. During the Late Classic Tazumal had links with Copán in Honduras, as evidenced by architecture, sculpture and ceramics at Tazumal. The ceramic sequence at Tazumal continues uninterrupted from the Classic period through to approximately AD 1200. A number of Early Classic features indicate links with Chichen Itza, in the northern Yucatán Peninsula, or with Tula in central Mexico.

The population of Tazumal coexisted with the Nahua-speaking Pipils from the Classic through to the Early Postclassic until at least AD 1200. The Pipil influence may have been due to trade with neighbouring Pipil populations rather than a direct Pipil presence, judging by the level of evidence.

After 1200, Tazumal was largely abandoned, with occupation shifting westwards towards the centre of what is now the modern town of Chalchuapa. Chalchuapa was still occupied at the time of the Spanish conquest, at which time its inhabitants were Poqomam Maya. The Pokomam are believed to have been relatively late settlers in Chalchuapa, postdating the Pipil influence that lasted until 1200.

Between 1942 and 1944 Stanley Boggs excavated and restored structures B1-1 and B1-2. This restoration included coating the structures with modern cement, which Boggs judged to be sufficiently similar to their original appearance as to justify its use. Boggs' final report was not made generally available and no further archaeological investigations were carried out until the early 21st century. In 1947 Tazumal was declared a National Historic Monument. Until 2001, the Salvadoran 100 colón note carried an illustration of the ruins of Tazumal. In 2004, the side of Structure B1-2 collapsed and the Salvadoran Consejo Nacional para la Cultura y el Arte (CONCULTURA - National Council for Culture and Art) initiated operations to excavate and stabilise the ruins. During the first decade of the 21st century, two simultaneous archaeological projects were initiated, the investigation of Structure B1-2 by CONCULTURA and the Proyecto Arqueológico de El Salvador (PAES) by the Japanese University of Nagoya.

== Site description ==
All the buildings in the Tazumal complex face west. Tazumal is believed to possess a Mesoamerican ballcourt; this is based upon the external appearance of two unexcavated mounds that are situated in the northwestern portion of the site, within a 20th-century cemetery. One of the mounds is badly damaged. Green obsidian artefacts found at Tazumal indicate links with central Mexico.

=== Structure B1-1 ===
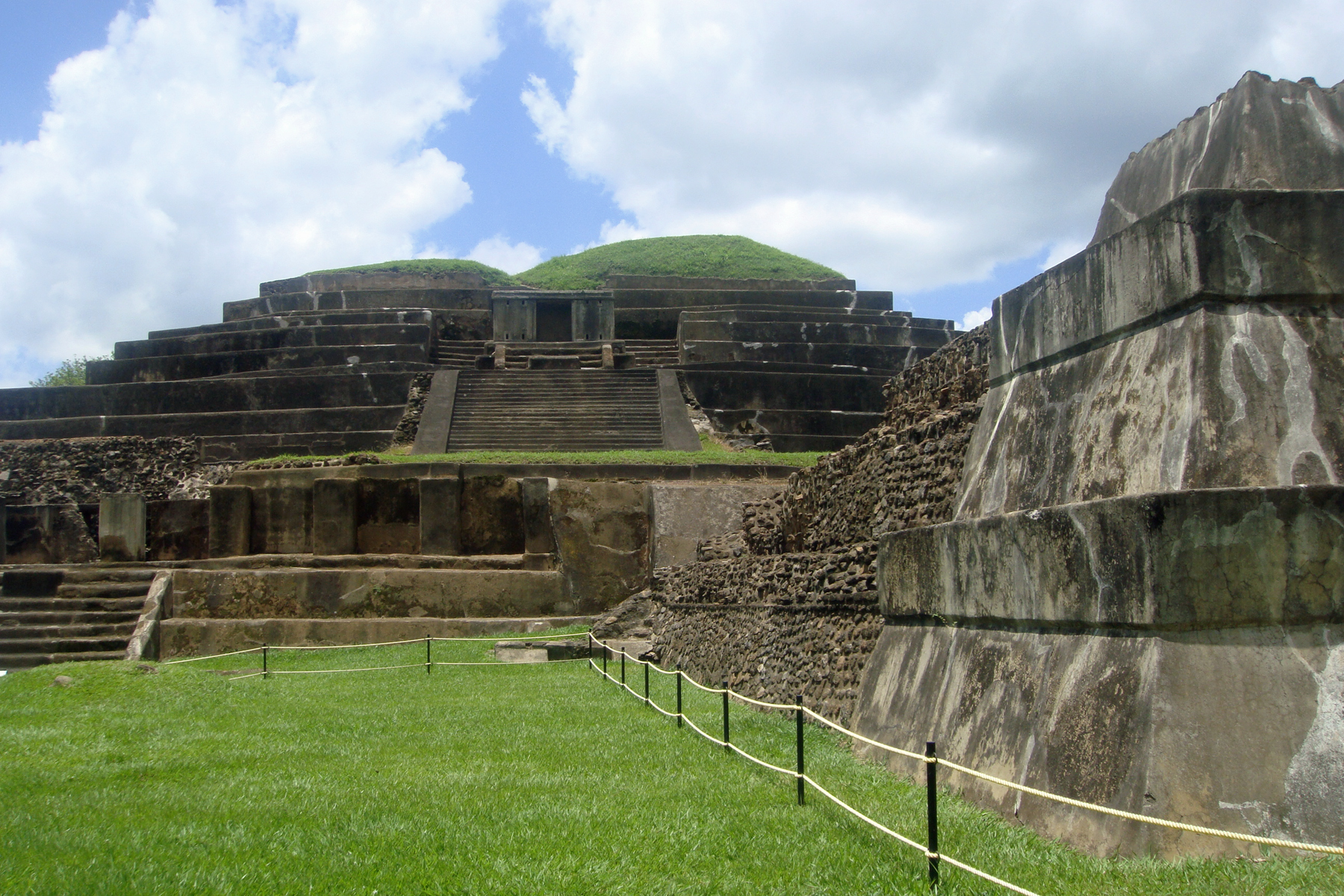
View towards the main pyramid B1-1, with Structure B1-2 on the right hand side

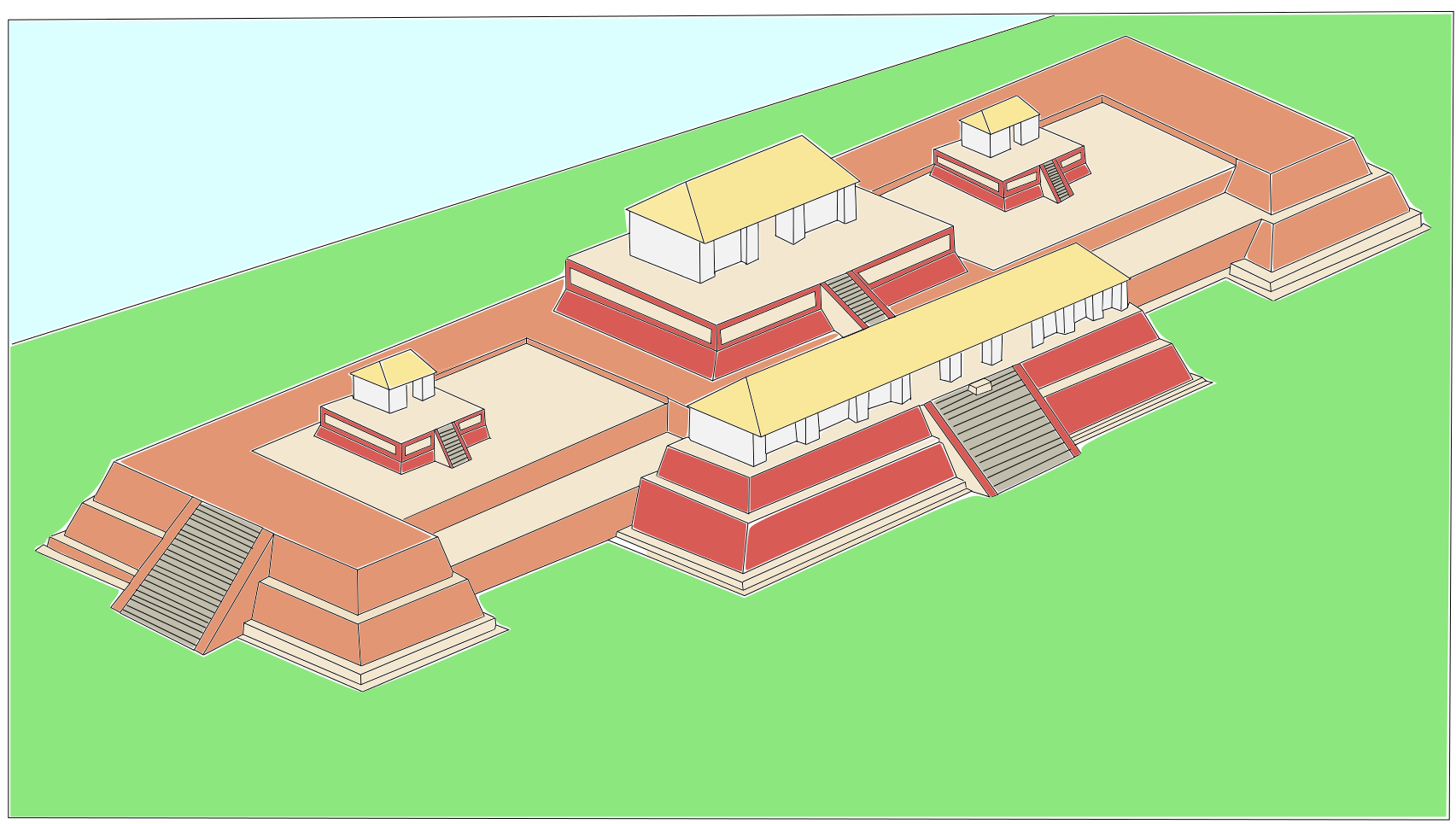
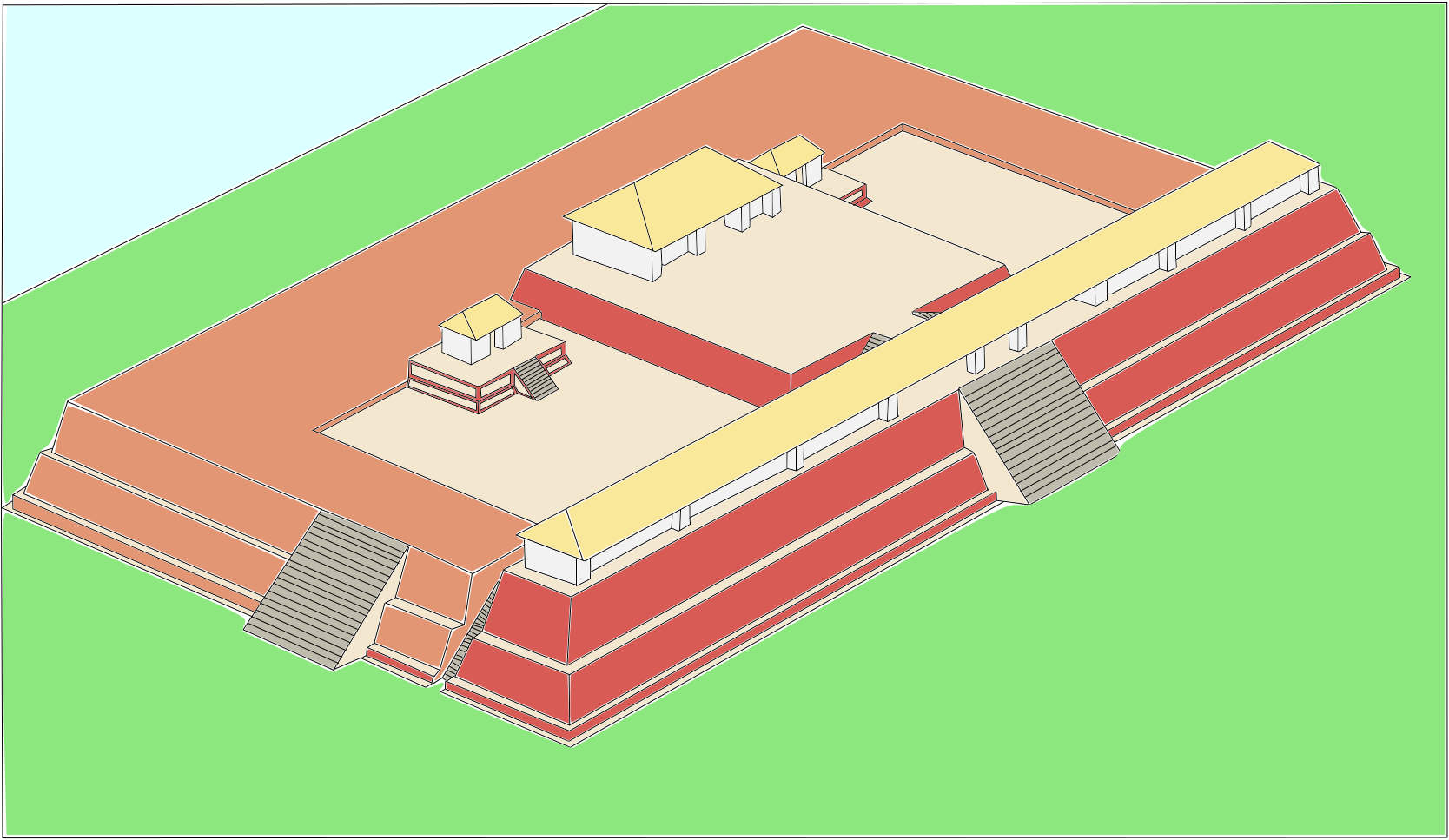
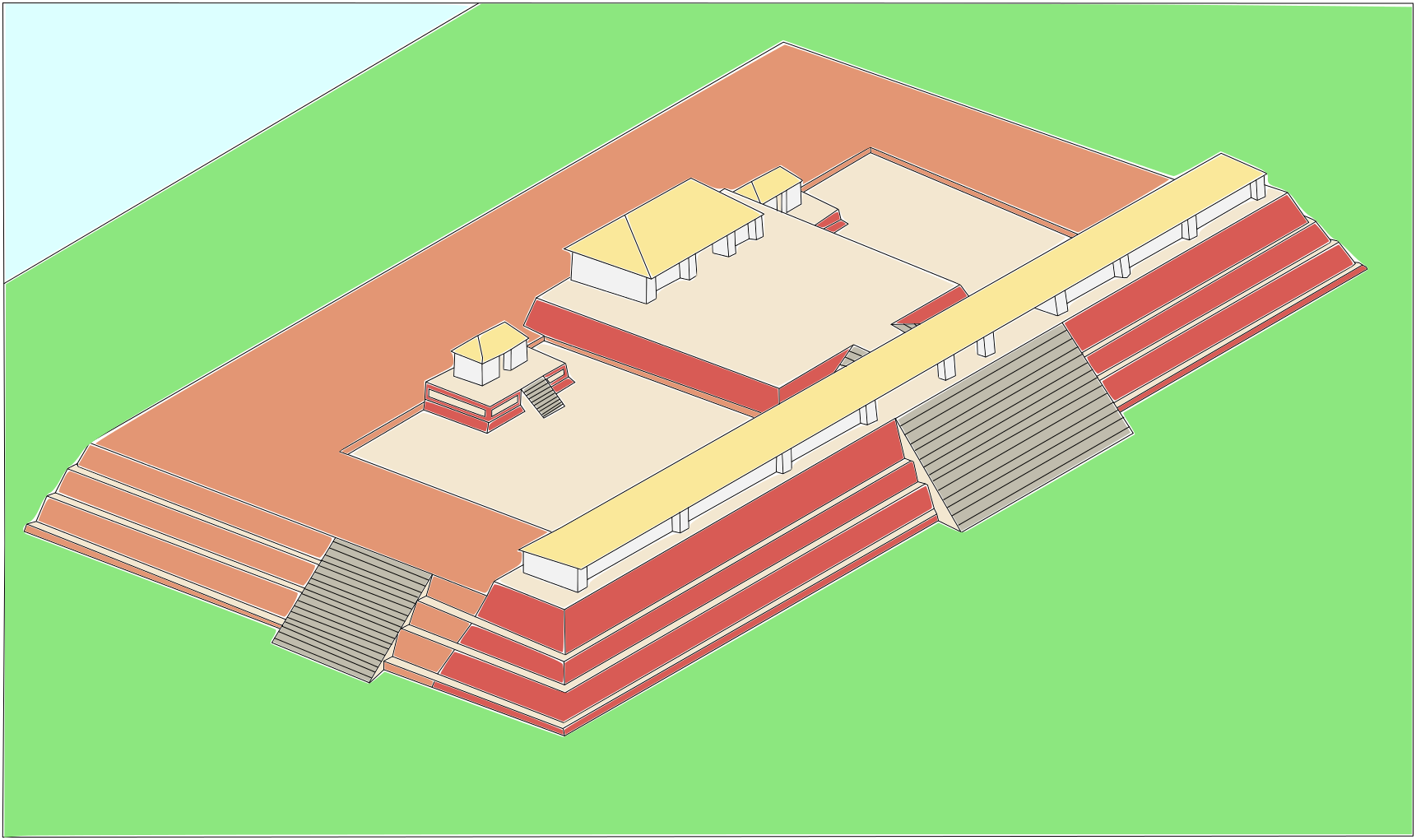
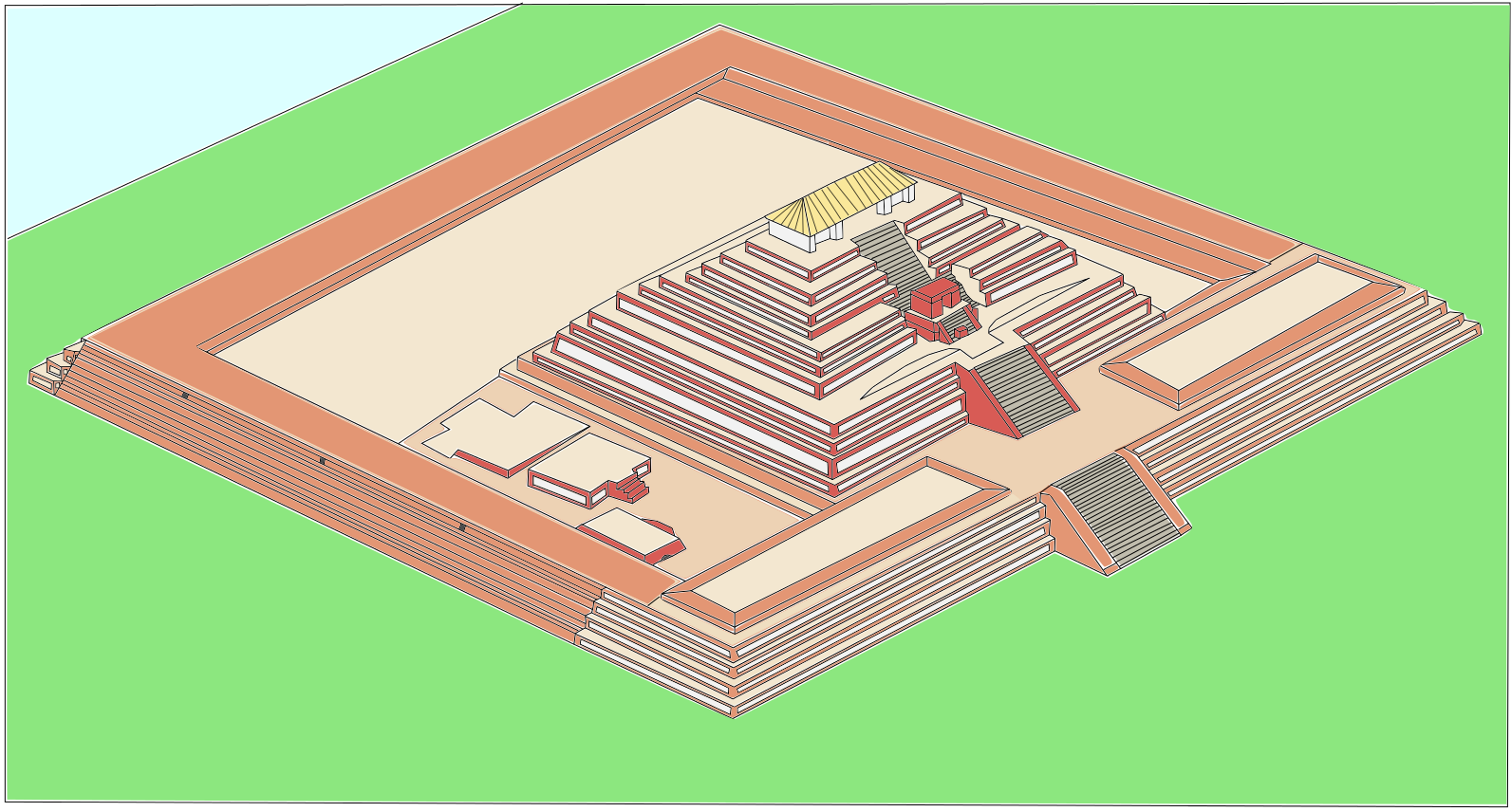
Evolution of the structure B1-1. In the top the stage B1-1d-III, in the early classic period, after the eruption of Lake Ilopango; in the second picture, the stage B1-1d-IV; in the third, the stage B1-1d-VII, in the final early classic period; and in the bottom, the structure B1-1 in late classic period

Structure B1-1 is the principal structure in the Tazumal group and dominates the complex. The pyramid underwent various phases of construction through the Classic and Early Postclassic periods. Structure B1-1 was built upon a basal platform, called the Great Platform by Boggs, that measures 73 by 87 metres (240 by 285 ft) (east-west by north-south). The pyramid was surveyed in 2003–2004. A 30 metres (98 ft) long platform runs north-south along the western facade of the pyramid and a platform of similar length runs east-west along the north side of the structure. These two side platforms were originally built as separate structures but were later incorporated into the Great Platform; it is presumed by investigators that the temple was radially symmetrical and that further platforms existed on the east and south sides. The remains of a platform measuring 4 by 3 metres (13.1 by 9.8 ft) were found in roughly the correct position for such a platform on the east side. A test pit sunk into the presumed area of the southern platform uncovered an offering containing a cylindrical ceramic vessel with a polychrome bowl placed upon it like a lid. Within the vessel were two larger pieces of jade and 50 smaller jade fragments, a fragment of seashell and a fragment of snail shell, various pieces of animal bone, mica and traces of red pigment. The offering was covered with a slab of stone. The cylindrical vessel was decorated with two panels, each containing a personage wearing a headdress and performing autosacrifice.

Structure B1-1 is believed to have developed from a central temple and platforms on each side in the cardinal directions, with the west platforms serving as the main approach. As the complex developed, the space between the platforms was filled to form the Great Platform, the earliest version of which measured 65 by 74 metres (213 by 243 ft). The main pyramid B1-1 was then built upon the Great Platform, behind the western platform and covering the original central temple. The Great Platform was remodelled at least three times before it reached its final dimensions.

==== Temple of the Columns ====
The western platform of Structure B1-1 supports a superstructure, which has been called the Temple of the Columns. Because of the westward orientation of all the structures at Tazumal, the Temple of the Columns standing on the west side of the main pyramid may have served as its main facade. This structure had square columns and two identically sized chambers, separated by a space with two columns. The northern chamber had an entrance on the east side, with a possible additional entrance on the south side.

=== Structure B1-2 ===
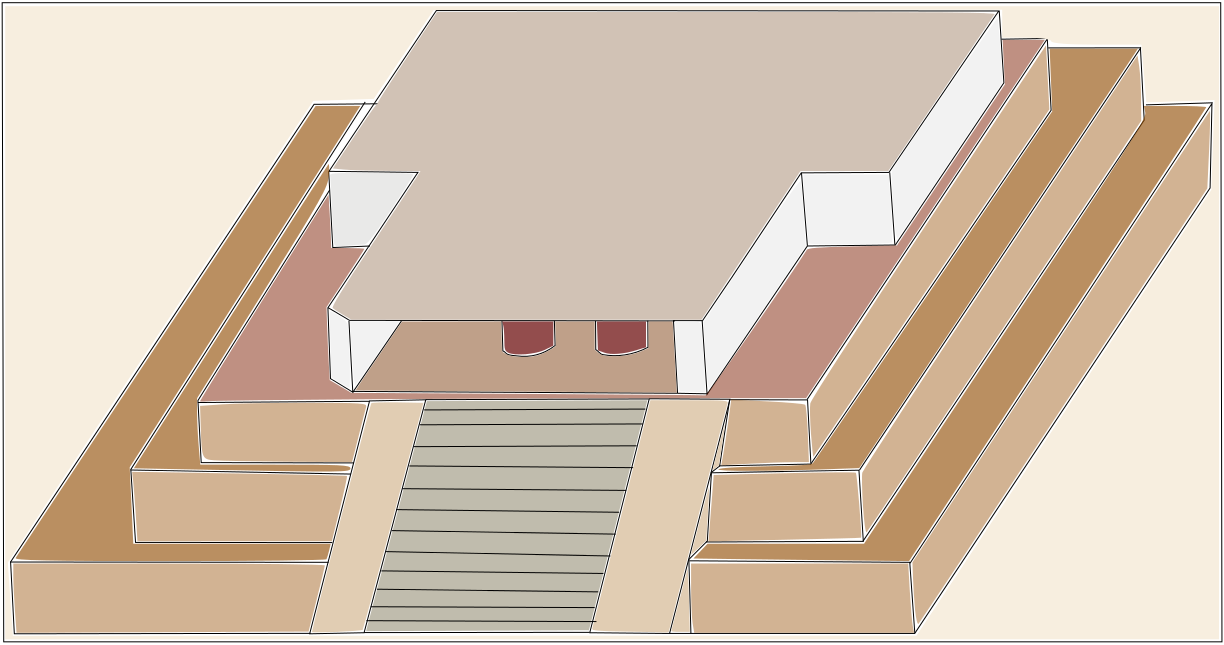
The structure B1-2 in the phase 3B, in Early Postclassic

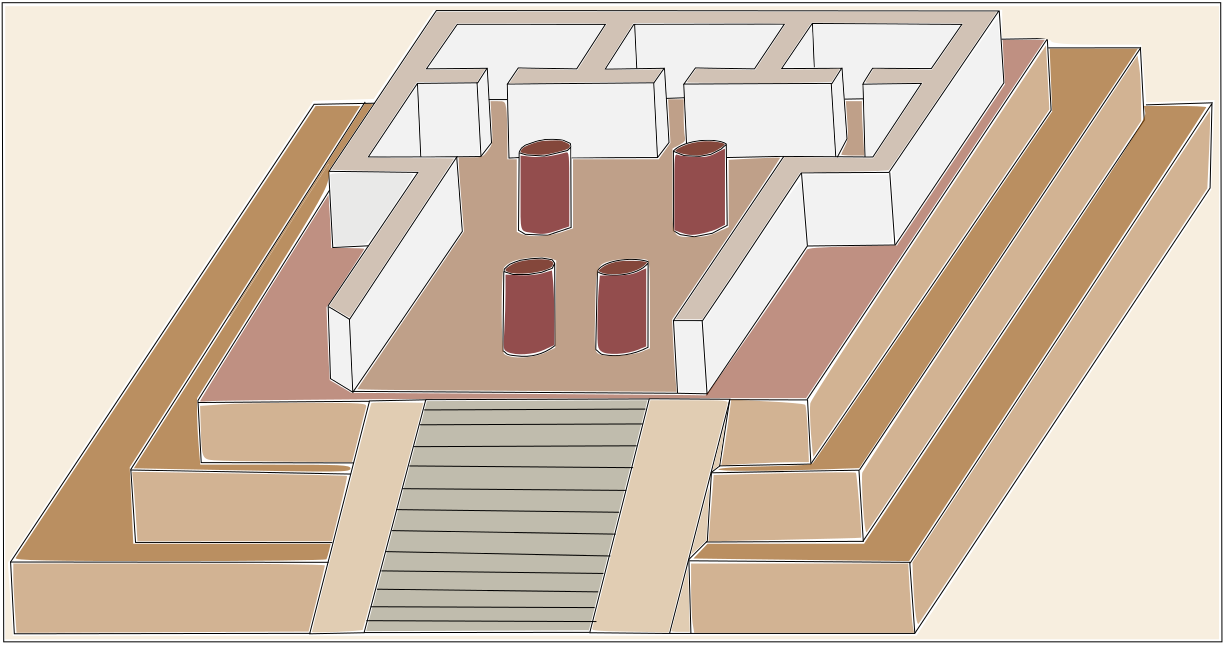
The structure B1-2 showing the interior of temple of the phase 3B

Structure B1-2 dates to the Late Classic. It is located to the southwest of the main pyramid B1-1. It is a west-facing pyramid with three stepped levels standing upon a low basal platform. It was built using the talud-tablero style of architecture; the pyramid measures 25 by 25 metres (82 by 82 ft) and stands approximately 6.8 metres (22 ft) tall. In October 2004 the south side of the pyramid collapsed; this is believed to have been caused by a combination of damage caused by the roots of nearby trees and water damage. The restoration of the pyramid with cement in the 1950s had converted the structure into a water trap, while cedar roots had penetrated the building to a height of 6 metres (20 ft) causing significant cracking.

Structure B1-2 underwent four phases of construction. The earliest phase had a total height of 4.7 metres (15 ft); the lowest level measured 1.1 metres (3.6 ft) high while the middle and upper levels both measured 1.8 metres (5.9 ft) high. This first phase was completely covered by the second phase of construction, executed in three sub-phases (labelled 2A, 2B and 2C). This was built in a style very similar to that of the first phase, first with the extension of the lower two levels while still using the earlier top level; a new third level was added later, completely covering the previous version. The lower two levels were first raised to 1.5 metres (4.9 ft) high; the middle level was then raised an additional 0.6 metres (2.0 ft) and the upper level was increased to 2 metres (6.6 ft) high. Finally, a fourth level was added to the pyramid, bringing its total height to 6.5 metres (21 ft). During the third phase of construction, the structure was increased from four to five levels. The levels varied in height between them, measuring 1.2 metres (3.9 ft), 1 metre (3.3 ft), 1.4 metres (4.6 ft), 0.7 metres (2.3 ft) and 1.4 metres (4.6 ft) respectively. The fourth and final construction phase was badly damaged by the collapse of the structure in 2004.

=== Other structures ===
Structure B1-3 and Structure B1-4 are the two structures that comprise the ballcourt. Test pits excavated during the first decade of the 21st century found the mortar floor of an I-shaped ballcourt.

Structure B1-8 is a circular platform dating to the Late Classic period.

== Sculpture ==
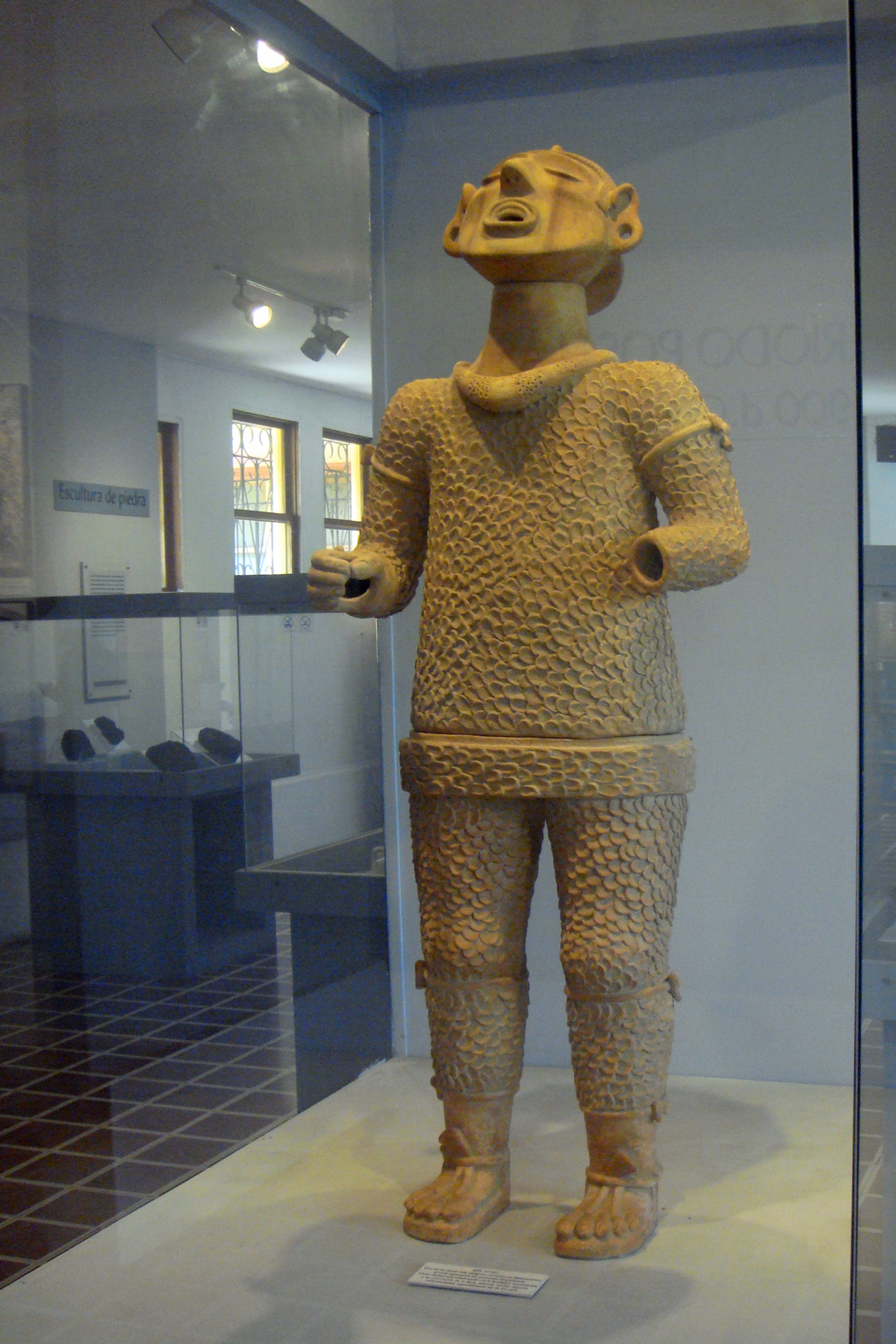
Sculpture in the Tazumal site museum representing the god Xipe Totec

Sculpture at the site dates as far back as the Preclassic period. Two Terminal Classic to Early Postclassic chacmool sculptures were recovered from Tazumal, as well as a jaguar effigy sculpture and an anthropomorphic sculpture depicting the central Mexican deity Xipe Totec. These artefacts are stylistically similar to artefacts from central Mexico and the northern Yucatán Peninsula. One of the crude chacmool sculptures is housed in the Museo Nacional de Antropología in San Salvador; the other is in private ownership.

== Metal artifacts ==
Three gold ornaments have been excavated from Tazumal. They were created using the lost wax method and have been tentatively dated to the 8th century AD; their presence indicates contacts with lower Central America. These, together with some contemporary metal artefacts from Copán, are among the earliest reported metal artefacts from Mesoamerica. These items were recovered from a Late Classic tomb and at least one item was a traded artefact from the Isthmus of Tehuantepec.

== Burials ==
According to anecdotal accounts from workers who excavated the area of the presumed eastern platform of B1-1, numerous burials were reportedly uncovered there. However, these burials are not documented in any of Boggs's excavation reports.

Burial 1 was interred 20 centimeters (7.9 in) beneath the ledge connecting the first and second levels of Pyramid B1-2. The burial consisted of a mandible and several other skeletal elements, accompanied by ceramic fragments and obsidian artifacts. The dispersed nature of the remains indicates that Burial 1 represents a secondary burial, possibly associated with a human sacrifice performed during the pyramid's final construction phase. Dental evidence indicates that the individual was a young adult, while the associated ceramics date the burial to the Terminal Classic or Early Postclassic period.

Burial 2 was located beneath the western facade of Structure B1-2. Its precise dating is uncertain, although it is believed to be associated with the structure's final construction phase and to be contemporaneous with Burial 1. The burial consisted of numerous skeletal fragments, including portions of the skull, ribs, mandible and vertebrae. Dental analysis shows that the individual was a child. The remains were accompanied by ceramic fragments and ash, which was subjected to radiocarbon dating, yielding a date between AD 770 and 1000, corresponding to the Late Classic to Early Postclassic period.
