= Boggs =

Boggs may refer to:

== Places ==
- Boggs (PAT station)
- Boggs, West Virginia
- Boggs Township, Armstrong County, Pennsylvania
- Boggs Township, Centre County, Pennsylvania
- Boggs Township, Clearfield County, Pennsylvania
- Boggs Island, on the Ohio River, West Virginia

== Other ==
- Boggs (surname)
- Boggs eumorphic projection, a world map projection
- The Boggs, an indie rock band from New York City
- USS Boggs (DD-136) (1918–1946), a Wickes class destroyer in the United States Navy
- Boggs, a character in The Hunger Games novels

== See also ==
- Bogs (disambiguation)
- Bloggs
