= Mary Townley =

Mary Townley may refer to:

- Mary Townley (1614-1662) (1614-1662) Great-Great-Grandmother of George Washington.
- Mary Townley (architect) (1753–1839), English architect
- Mary Katherine Campbell (1905–1990), only person to win the Miss America pageant twice, married Frederick Townley
- Mary Boggs (1920–2002), American muralist and textbook author who published under the name Mary Ross Townley
