= Metallurgy in pre-Columbian Mesoamerica =

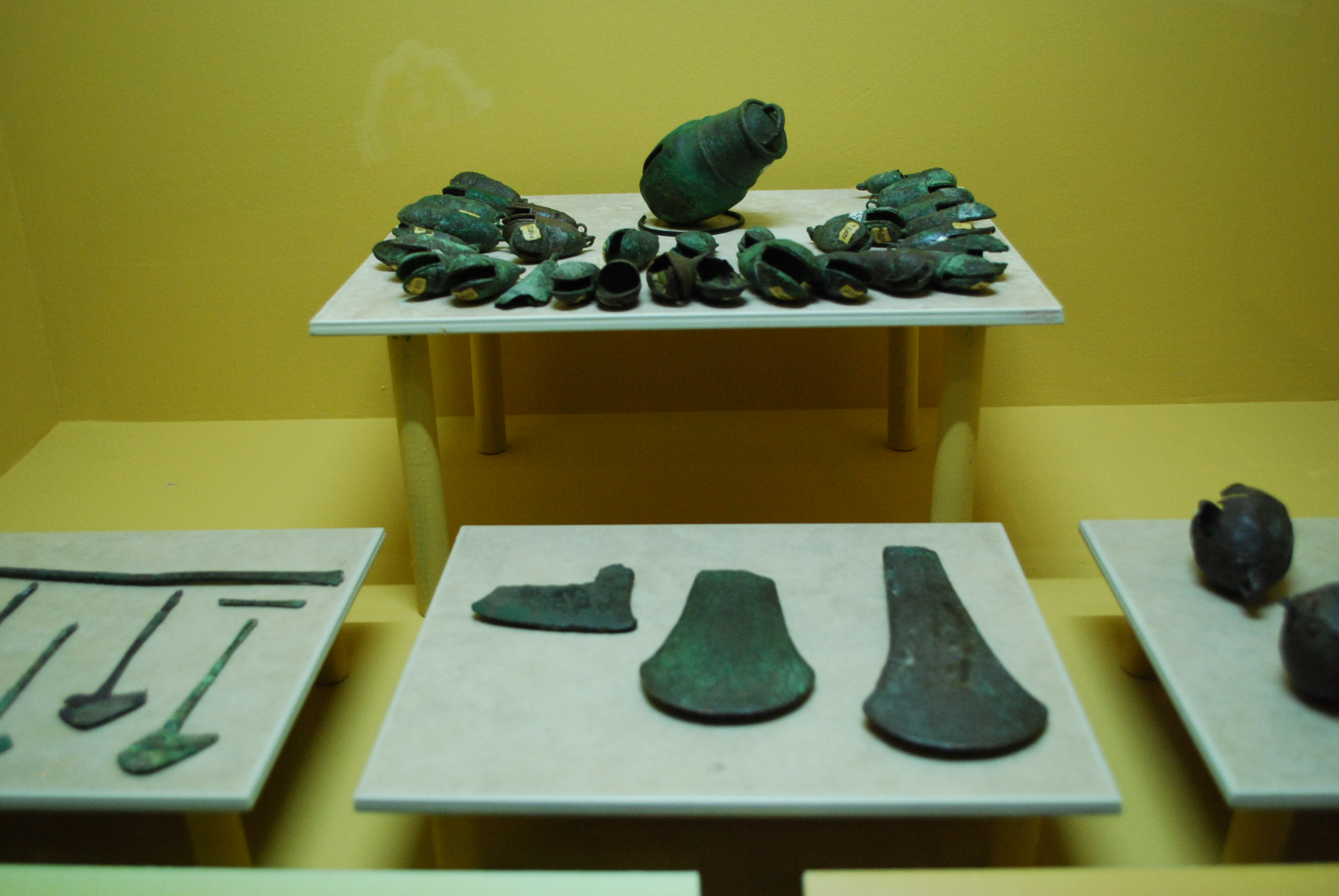
Copper bells, axe heads and ornaments from various parts of Chiapas (1200–1500) on display at the Regional Museum in Tuxtla Gutierrez, Chiapas.

The emergence of metallurgy in pre-Columbian Mesoamerica occurred relatively late in the region's history, with distinctive works of metal apparent in West Mexico by roughly 800 CE, and perhaps as early as 600 CE. Metallurgical techniques likely diffused northward from regions in Central or South America via maritime trade routes; recipients of these metallurgical technologies apparently exploited a wide range of material, including alloys of copper-silver, copper-arsenic, copper-tin and copper-arsenic-tin.

Metal items crafted throughout Mesoamerica may be broken into three classes: utilitarian objects, objects used for individual ornamentation, and ceremonial/ritual objects. The latter two categories comprise the bulk of distinctly Mesoamerican artifacts, with metals playing a particularly important role in the sacred and symbolic cultural realms.

== Possible location of Mesoamerican metallurgy ==
=== West Mexico ===
The earliest and most diverse finds of metal artifacts are from West Mexico stretching in a belt along the Pacific coast from Guerrero to Nayarit. This indicates that this region was a regional nucleus of metallurgy, from which elements of technique, form and style could have diffused throughout Mesoamerica.

=== Southern Mexico ===
The Mixtec civilization have long been thought to be the dominant goldsmiths of post-classic Mesoamerica. A large number of gold artifacts found in central and southern Mexico have been attributed to the Mixtec.

=== Central Mexico ===
There is recent evidence that suggests that the Aztec civilization was a distinct locus of metallurgy, though gold objects from this area had previously been attributed to the Mixtec.

=== Huastec area ===
Some locally produced artifacts have been found in late-postclassic sites in the La Huasteca region.

== Developments in West Mexican metallurgy ==
=== Phase 1: AD 600–1200/1300 ===
West Mexican smiths worked primarily in copper during the initial period, with some low-arsenic alloys, as well as occasional employment of silver and gold. Lost-wax cast bells were introduced from lower Central America and Colombia during this phase, along with several classes of cold-worked ornaments and hand tools, such as needles and tweezers. The prototypes for these small, often utilitarian items appear rooted in southern Ecuador and northern Peru. Small copper rings, generally found in burial contexts, are also common to Ecuador and Western Mexico and are abundant during this phase.

Excavated assemblages from the initial phase indicate that lost-wax cast bells also occupied a substantial portion of West Mexican artisans' efforts. Unlike similar bells recovered from coastal Ecuador, West Mexican bells were cast, rather than worked, metal. Typically composed of a smooth, suspended metal shell encasing an interior clapper, the West Mexican bells were generally fashioned from copper alloys and bore particular resemblance to bells made in Colombia, Panama and Costa Rica.

=== Phase 2: 1200/1300–1521 ===
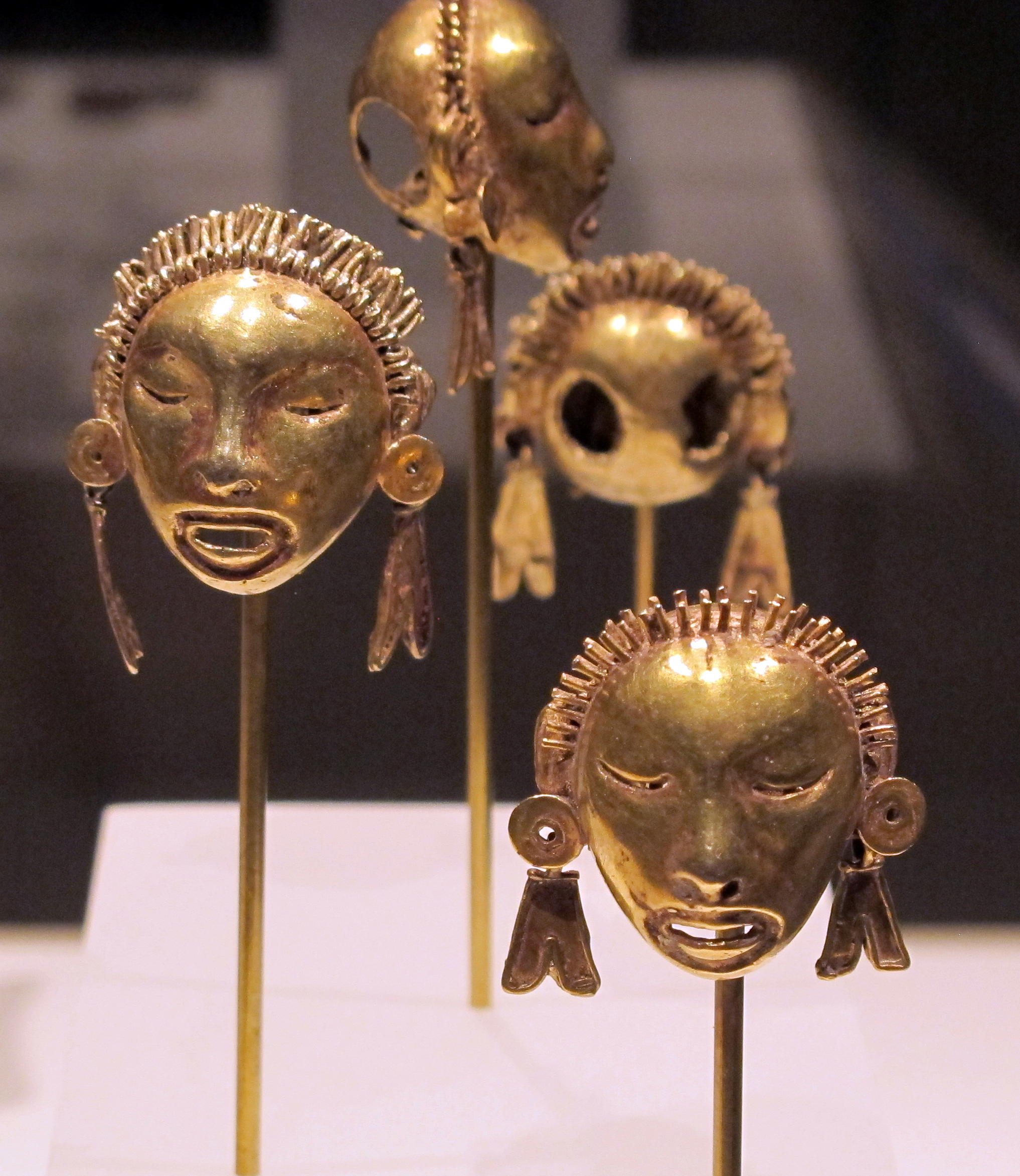
Gold pendants in the shape of heads, Mixtec or Aztec, c. 1400–1515, Metropolitan Museum of Art.

Metal smiths demonstrated increasing technical sophistication, producing both utilitarian and status-linked items. During the latter phase, Michoacán emerged as a technological hub, with metal artifacts also appearing at the adjacent zones of Guerrero and Jalisco.

Alloys became more prevalent during the second phase, as metal workers experimented with color, strength and fluidity. Formerly utilitarian assemblages transformed, with new focus placed upon metallic status objects. Further, the appearance of a copper-tin bronze alloy suggests contact between West Mexico and Peru during this period. However, many of the alloys/alloy concentrations used in West Mexico appear to reflect local innovation.

Scholars such as Dorothy Hosler suggest that ancient Mesoamericans were unique in their attention to the peculiar aesthetic properties of metals, such as the brilliant sounds and colors evoked through the movement of metallic objects. The rather late emergence of metallurgy in ancient Mesoamerica likely contributed to its novelty and subsequent role as a marker of elite status.

It has been suggested that Mesoamerican metal smiths produced particular alloys with the chief aim of exploiting the alloys’ emergent color properties, particularly the vivid gold tones produced through infusion of tin, and the silver shades that develop at high arsenic concentrations. Notably, certain artifacts from West Mexico contain tin or arsenic at concentrations as high as 23 weight percent, while concentrations of alloying elements at roughly 2 to 5 weight percent are typically adequate for augmented strength and mechanical utility.

Metal smiths in pre-Columbian West Mexico particularly exploited the brilliance inherent in metallic sound and sheen, suggesting that their creations tended to occupy a sacred and symbolic space. Metallic colors, gold and silver, might have been connected with solar and lunar deities while bell sounds have been associated with fertility rituals and protection in warfare.

== Archaeological sites yielding metal artifacts ==
=== Central Mexico ===
(AD 900–1450) Utilitarian and ceremonial objects; Objects of personal adornment'

1. Atotonilco, Hidalgo
2. Calixtlahuaca, Mexico
3. Tenayuca, Mexico
4. Tenochitlan, Distrito Federal (D.F.)
5. Teotihuacan, Mexico
6. Texcoco, Mexico

=== West Mexico ===
(AD 800/900–1450) Utilitarian and ceremonial objects; objects of personal adornment

1. Amapa, Nayarit
2. Apatzingán, Michoacán
3. Atoyac, Jalisco
4. Cojumatlán, Michoacán
5. Coyuca de Catalán, Guerrero
6. Culiacán, Sinaloa
7. Jiquilpan, Michoacán
8. Peñitas, Nayarit
9. Río Balsas, Guerrero
10. Tancitaro, Michoacán
11. Telpalcátepec, Michoacán
12. Tepic, Nayarit
13. Texmelincan, Guerrero
14. Tuxcacuesco, Jalisco
15. Tzintzuntzan, Michoacán
16. Yestla, Guerrero
17. Zacpu, Michoacán
18. Zamora, Michoacán

=== Eastern Mexico ===
(AD 900–1500) Objects of personal adornment and ceremonial objects

1. Cerro Montoso, Veracruz
2. Chachalacas, Veracruz
3. El Tajin, Veracruz
4. Isla de Sacrificios, Veracruz
5. Pánuco, Veracruz
6. Tampico, Veracruz

=== Oaxaca area ===
(AD 900–1500) Utilitarian and ceremonial objects; objects of personal adornment

1. Coatlán, Oaxaca
2. Coixtlahuaca, Oaxaca
3. Ejutla, Oaxaca
4. Guiengola, Oaxaca
5. Huajuapan, Oaxaca
6. Huitzo, Oaxaca
7. Juquila, Oaxaca
8. Mitla, Oaxaca
9. Monte Albán Oaxaca
10. Sola de Vega, Oaxaca
11. Tehuantepec, Oaxaca
12. Teotitlán del Camino, Oaxaca
13. Teotitlán del Valle, Oaxaca
14. Tlacolula, Oaxaca
15. Tlaxiaco, Oaxaca
16. Tututepec, Oaxaca
17. Xaaga, Oaxaca
18. Yanhuitlán, Oaxaca
19. Zachila, Oaxaca

=== Southern Maya Area ===
(AD 450(?)–1500) Utilitarian and ceremonial objects; objects of personal adornment

1. Chipal, Guatemala
2. Chutixtiox, Guatemala
3. Copán, Honduras
4. Kaminaljuyú, Guatemala
5. Motagua River valley, Guatemala
6. Los Naranjos, Honduras
7. Nebaj, Guatemala
8. Quemistlá "Bell Caves", Honduras
9. Quiriguá, Guatemala
10. San Augustín Acasaguastlán, Guatemala
11. Tajumulco, Guatemala
12. Tazumal, El Salvador
13. Zacualpa, Guatemala
14. Zaculeu, Guatemala

=== Central Maya Area ===
(AD 900–1500) Utilitarian and ceremonial objects; objects of personal adornment

1. Chiapa de Corzo, Chiapas
2. El Paredón, Chiapas
3. Polol, Guatemala
4. Santa Rita Corozal, Belize
5. Nojpetén, Guatemala
6. Tikal, Guatemala
7. Yaxhá, Guatemala
8. Palenque, Chiapas
9. Wild Cane Cay, Belize
10. Lamanai, Belize

=== Northern Maya Area ===
(1000–1450) Utilitarian and ceremonial objects; objects of personal adornment

1. Chichén Itzá, Yucatán
2. Dzantún C’hen, Yucatán
3. Mayapán, Yucatán

=== Northern Mexico ===
(1000–1450) Utilitarian objects; objects of personal adornment

1. Casas Grandes, Chihuahua
2. Chalchihuites, Zacatecas
3. Hervideros, Durango
4. La Quemada, Zacatecas
5. Navocoyán, Durango
6. Chihuahua, Chihuahua
7. Schroeder site, Durango
8. Venis Meicis, San Luis Potosí
9. Zape, Durango
10. Babicora, Chihuahua
11. Rancho San Miguiel, Chihuahua
12. Santa Maria R., Chihuahua

== See also ==
- Tumbaga
- Traditional copper work in Mexico
- Axe-monies
