= Paula Boggs Band =

American band

Paula Boggs Band is an American band formed in Seattle, Washington in 2007. It was formed by former U.S. Army officer and attorney Paula Boggs (vocals, guitar, ukulele).

The band plays a blend of jazz, bluegrass, soul, folk, and Americana, and describes their sound as "Seattle-brewed Soulgrass."

== History ==
Boggs formed the band after meeting percussionist Tor Dietrichson on MySpace and former band member (guitar/banjo player) Mark Chinen at a concert while vacationing in Hawaii.

Other band members include David Salonen (bass, fiddle, guitar, mandolin, vocals), Tor Dietrichson (percussion,vocals), Paul Matthew Moore (keys,accordion,vocals), Jacob Evans (drums), and Darren Loucas (banjo, guitar, harmonica, lap steel, vocals).

Former band member Alex Dyring and current band member Jacob Evans are second-generation musicians. Dyring is the son of Seattle Symphony violist Wes Dyring. Evans is the son of Ray Charles Orchestra jazz trumpeter Jack Evans.

== Music releases ==
The band released their debut album, A Buddha State of Mind in 2010.

The band released their second studio album, Carnival of Miracles, in 2015. It was produced by Grammy Award-winning producer Trina Shoemaker. The album featured musical appearances by Michael Shrieve, Geoffrey Castle, and Andrew Joslyn.

The band appeared on the news program New Day Northwest on December 7, 2015. In February 2017, the band performed on the television program Band in Seattle.

In 2017, the band released the single "Benediction," which was written in response to the 2015 Charleston church shooting. The band also released a cover of the Bon Iver song "Holocene." Both of these songs appeared on the band's album Elixir: The Soulgrass Sessions, which was released in September 2017. In the same year, the band released a live EP titled Songs of Protest and Hope.

In 2018, Paula Boggs Band released a Christmas single titled "Mistletoe & Shiny Guitars."

The band released an EP titled Electrokitty Sessions in 2020.

The band released the single "America 2020" in 2020, produced by multi-Grammy-nominated Tucker Martine.

The band released an album titled Janus in 2022.

Paula Boggs Band released the album Sweetwater-Music-Hall Live at Sweetwater Music Hall on August 23, 2024.

Paula Boggs Band released the album Sumatra on March 27, 2026. The album features The Blind Boys of Alabama and Valerie June. Two tracks from the album received honors at the 2025 InterContinental Music Awards: "Sumatra" won Best of North America Alternative, while "Traces of You" won Best of North America Contemporary Instrumental.

== Endorsements ==
Paula Boggs Band has served as a music ambassador or featured artist for Breedlove Guitars, Deering Banjo Company, Radial Engineering, and Ear Trumpet Labs.
