= Zaki Hasan =

Chairman of UNICEF
- In office 1979–1980
- Preceded by: Sadako Ogata
- Succeeded by: Paal Bog

Khawaja Zaki Hasan, known as Zaki Hasan or K. Zaki Hasan, is a Pakistani physician, neuropsychiatrist and a former chairman of UNICEF (1979–1980).

He was professor of neuropsychiatry at the Jinnah Post Graduate Medical Centre in Karachi, and was particularly focused on the health and social aspects of children. He became a member of the UNICEF executive board at the international level in 1972 and served until 1981, for the last terms as first vice-chairman and finally as chairman.
