= Elizabeth Monroe Boggs =

Policy maker, scholar, and advocate for people with developmental disabilities

- Born: Elizabeth Monroe; April 5, 1913; Cleveland, Ohio, U.S.
- Died: January 27, 1996 (aged 82); Camden, New Jersey, U.S.
- Education: Bryn Mawr College; University of Cambridge
- Spouse: Fitzhugh Willets Boggs (m. 1941; died 1971)

Elizabeth Monroe Boggs (April 5, 1913 - January 27, 1996) was an American policy maker, scholar, and advocate for people with developmental disabilities. The University of Medicine and Dentistry of New Jersey named "The Elizabeth M. Boggs Center on Developmental Disabilities" in late 1997 in her honor.

== Biography ==
Elizabeth Monroe Boggs was born in Cleveland, Ohio to Francis Adair Monroe Jr., a chemical engineer, and Elizabeth McNairy. She attended Concord Academy and, in 1935, Elizabeth graduated from Bryn Mawr College summa cum laude, with distinction in mathematics. While at Bryn Mawr, she studied with mathematician Emmy Noether before Noether's death in 1935. John Lennard-Jones supervised her PhD work in the Theoretical Chemistry Laboratory at the University of Cambridge, where her thesis project focused on solving the Schrödinger equation for a heteronuclear diatomic ion. Maurice Vincent Wilkes assisted her with the university's differential analyser built out of Meccano.

After graduating in 1939, Monroe Boggs joined John Kirkwood’s group at Cornell University. Here, she shared an office with Fitzhugh Willets Boggs (1911-1971), Kirkwood's graduate student; they were married in 1941. During the 1942-1943 academic year, she lectured introductory physics to pre-medical and pre-dental students at the University of Pittsburgh. However, as she was unsatisfied with the lack of research opportunities, Edward Condon secured her a position at the Explosives Research Laboratory in Bruceton, Pennsylvania during the war years.

Along with ERL leader George B. Kistiakowsky, Monroe Boggs eventually relocated from ERL to Los Alamos to participate in Division X of the Manhattan Project. Her research on explosive lenses contributed to the implosion-type atom bomb used in the Trinity test and on Nagasaki.

Her last day at Los Alamos was August 6, 1945, the day the uranium bomb was dropped on Hiroshima, leaving her research career because she was pregnant. After the birth of their son David (1945–2000), who had developmental disabilities following an infection, she became involved in advocacy and the development of public policy for people with disabilities.

== Research achievements ==
Elizabeth Monroe Boggs' thesis worked entailed building part of the Cambridge Meccano model differential analyser and using it to solve the quantum chemistry problem for a heteroatom diatomic ion. Her best-known finding is her prediction in 1940, with John G. Kirkwood, in the Journal of Chemical Physics, that a system of hard spheres would undergo a first-order liquid-crystal phase transition. The 1942 paper clearly states the seminal prediction that a system of hard spheres without attraction must crystallize at sufficiently small volumes.

== Advocacy work ==
A founder of the National Association for Retarded Children (now known as The Arc of the United States), she served as the Association's first woman president. Throughout her career, she remained involved with The Arc's Governmental Affairs Committee and its activities.

She was appointed by John F. Kennedy to serve on the President's Panel on Mental Retardation and as vice-chair of The Task Force on the Law, 1961–1963, and on the President's Committee on Mental Retardation.

Working with the International League of Societies for the Mentally Handicapped, she was a principal author of the United Nations Declaration of General and Special Rights of the Mentally Retarded. With Justin Dart, Elizabeth Monroe Boggs co-chaired the congressionally appointed Task Force on Rights and Empowerment of People with Disabilities, an important impetus to the passage of the Americans with Disabilities Act. She served on the SSI Modernization Project and, at the time of her death, was serving on the Social Security Administration's Task Force on Representative Payees.

Elizabeth Monroe Boggs' many national awards and recognitions include the Kennedy International Award for Leadership, the Distinguished Public Service Award from HEW (now United States Department of Health and Human Services), the Distinguished Service Award from UCPA, the Wallace Wallin Award from CEC, and the N. Neal Pike Prize for Service to People with Disabilities. She was also recognized by the American Association of University Affiliated Programs, The Arc-US, and the President's Committee on Employment of People with Disabilities. Elizabeth was a Life Fellow of AAMR (now American Association on Intellectual and Developmental Disabilities), and an Honorary Fellow of the American Psychiatric Association and the American Academy of Pediatrics. Elizabeth was awarded honorary degrees from the University of Medicine and Dentistry of New Jersey, Kean College, and Ohio State University.
