= Bogs (name) =

Bogs is a given name and surname. Notable people and fictional characters with the name include:

== People ==
- Bogs Adornado (born 1951), Filipino professional basketball player
- Jürgen Bogs (born 1947), German football coach
- Steffen Bogs (born 1965), German rower
- Tom Bogs (1944–2023), Danish middleweight boxer

== Fictional characters ==
- Bogs Diamond, inmate character in the film The Shawshank Redemption

== See also ==
- Boggs (surname)
