= William Boggs =

William Boggs may refer to:

- William Ellison Boggs (1838–1920), chancellor of the University of Georgia
- William Robertson Boggs (1829–1911), Confederate general during the American Civil War
- Bill Boggs (born 1941), American television presenter and journalist
- William Brenton Boggs (1918–2011), Canadian leader in military and commercial aviation
- William Benton Boggs (1854–1922), Louisiana politician
