= Hampton E. Boggs =

- Born: 17 August 1921; Garvin, Oklahoma, U.S.
- Died: 31 January 1953 (aged 31); Truax Field, Wisconsin, U.S.
- Military career
- Allegiance: United States
- Branch: United States Army Air Forces; United States Air Force
- Service years: 1941–1953
- Rank: Major
- Conflicts: World War II: South West Pacific Theatre; Korean War
- Awards: Distinguished Service Cross; Silver Star; Distinguished Flying Cross (3); Air Medal (8)

Hampton Edward Boggs (17 August 1921 – 31 January 1953) was an American fighter pilot and flying ace of World War II. He was the United States' second highest scoring ace with the 459th Fighter Squadron, 80th Fighter Group during the China Burma India Theater (CBI), and later served as a pilot during the Korean War. A fighter pilot with the United States Army Air Forces (USAAF) and the United States Air Force (USAF) flying the Curtiss P-40, Lockheed P-38 Lightning, the North American Aviation F-86 Sabre aircraft and also the recipient of the Distinguished Flying Cross.

== Awards and decorations ==
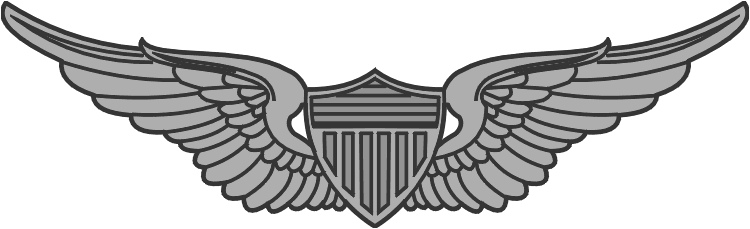
- USAAF pilot badge
- USAF pilot badge
- Distinguished Service Cross

Citation:

The President of the United States takes pleasure in presenting the Distinguished Service Cross to Hampton E. Boggs (0-728557), Captain (Air Corps), U.S. Army Air Forces, for extraordinary heroism in connection with military operations against an armed enemy while serving as Pilot of a P-38 Fighter Airplane in the 459th Fighter Squadron, 80th Fighter Group, TENTH Air Force, in aerial combat against enemy forces on 25 March 1944, in the China-Burma-India Theater of Operations. On this date in aerial combat, Captain Boggs shot down three enemy aircraft in a single mission. Captain Boggs' unquestionable valor in aerial combat is in keeping with the highest traditions of the military service and reflects great credit upon himself, the 10th Air Force, and the United States Army Air Forces.

Headquarters: U.S. Army Forces-China/Burma/India, General Orders No. 131 (1944)
