= Michael Boggs =

Michael Boggs may refer to:

- Michael P. Boggs (born 1962), justice of the Supreme Court of Georgia
- Michael Boggs (musician) (born 1978), American Christian musician
