= Richard Boggs =

California neurologist and murderer (1933–2003)

Richard Pryde Boggs (May 15, 1933 – March 6, 2003) was a Californian neurologist who was sentenced to life in prison in 1990 for his part in a scheme that involved murdering a man in 1988 and giving the victim another man's identity in order to collect on a US$1 million (equivalent to $2.3 million in 2025) life insurance policy.

== Murder and insurance scam ==
Boggs lured a drunk 32-year-old Ellis Henry Greene into his office in Glendale, California and disabled him with a stun gun, then suffocated him with the help of co-conspirator Melvin Eugene "Gene" Hanson on April 16, 1988.

Boggs called paramedics after the killing, and when they arrived, falsely identified Greene as Hanson after having forged medical records and included Hanson's birth certificate and credit cards on Greene's body. The officers called to the scene were initially suspicious of Boggs' story, believing it was unlikely a doctor would meet a patient in his office at 5:00 a.m. and realizing the temperature of the body when found did not correspond to the time of death given by Boggs, who as a neurosurgeon would not be expected to be treating a heart patient. They refused to let Boggs sign the death certificate and called in the coroner; after the coroner's report ruled the death was due to myocarditis, John Hawkins, Hanson's business partner in a clothing store chain in Ohio (named Just Sweats), was called in to identify the body, which he did. Unknown to the authorities, Hawkins was working with Boggs and Hanson.

The case was officially closed, and the body was quickly cremated at the behest of Hawkins, who collected the $1 million life insurance policy he had taken out on Hanson, cleaned out his bank accounts, and disappeared. Hanson also went into hiding, adopting an identity as Wolfgang Von Snowden.

== Exposure and downfall ==
Meanwhile, Farmers Insurance, which had paid out the insurance policy, obtained Melvin Hanson's driver's license to compare to the picture of the body that was found. They were checking for possible insurance fraud, and what they found led them to hire a private investigator to investigate the case. At the same time, Columbus Dispatch reporters Robin Yocum and Catherine Candisky began to look into the case, as well as the California Department of Insurance Fraud Division (CDI) and Glendale Police Department. Mike Jones, the lead investigator assigned at CDI, recognized that Hanson's driver's license photo did not match the coroner's photo or the thumbprint of the deceased at Boggs's office, and with CDI investigator Kathy Scholz, reviewed missing person reports in the LA area.

After Investigator Scholz located the missing person report of Ellis Greene, CDI investigators identified Greene as the dead man, and a second coroner's report based on photographs and the original finding ruled Greene had been murdered. Hanson was arrested while arriving at DFW Airport from Acapulco, Mexico after being detained by an alert U.S. Customs officer who suspected Hanson was a drug courier because he was carrying a large amount of U.S. currency and had scars from plastic surgery. Hanson was referred to the U.S. Customs Office of Enforcement, where agents began an interrogation and discovered numerous inconsistencies in Hanson's story and paperwork.

In Hanson's knapsack, the Customs agents found $14,000 of undeclared cash, several stolen or forged identification cards (including the California state driver's license of Ellis Greene), and a library book How To Create a New Identity. The Customs agents contacted the FBI in Columbus, and after confirming an outstanding arrest warrant, placed Hanson under arrest. Boggs was arrested the same week at his office.

Hawkins managed to leave the United States despite a flurry of media exposure. His case was profiled on America's Most Wanted and The Oprah Winfrey Show, and reported around the world before Hawkins was captured off Sardinia by Italian police in 1991. While awaiting extradition to the U.S., Hawkins attempted to escape from prison, but this was thwarted by alert guards.

Boggs and Hanson were both convicted of Greene's murder and multiple counts of fraud and were sentenced to life imprisonment plus nine years without parole, and Hawkins was convicted of conspiracy to murder and fraud and was sentenced to 34 years to life. Hawkins received a lighter sentence as he had not been involved in the actual murder; he was paroled in 2010.

== Aftermath ==
Yocum and Candisky published the book Insured for Murder detailing the case. The story was also featured in two TruTV series: The Forensic Files episode titled "Mistaken for Dead" and the fourth episode of Murder by the Book, which guest-starred Jonathan Kellerman. Also, the crime was featured in the episode "Doctor of Death" in Blood, Lies and Alibis. In 1992, Edwin Chen, an investigative reporter for the Los Angeles Times, wrote a book titled Cheating Death, which provides an in-depth review of the murder.

Unsolved Mysteries and America's Most Wanted profiled the case when Hawkins was still a fugitive of justice. It was through The Oprah Winfrey Show, profiling John Walsh's America's Most Wanted episodes that an international viewer provided the critical lead for law enforcement to apprehend John Hawkins in Italy. Vanity Fair also published an exposé on the case in 1992.

== Death of Richard Boggs ==
Richard Boggs died of a heart attack at the age of 69 on March 6, 2003 while serving his sentence at Corcoran State Prison. At the time of his death, Boggs had been HIV positive for over ten years, and had also been diagnosed with terminal pancreatic cancer.

== Bibliography ==
- Yocum, Robin & Candisky, Catherine (2001). Insured for Murder. ISBN 0-87975-842-2.
- Chen, Edwin (1992). "Cheating Death". ISBN 0-451-40315-0
- Vanity Fair, "The Trail of a Hustler", 1992 ISSN 0733-8899
