= Paula Boggs =

American attorney and musician

- Education: Johns Hopkins University, University of California, Berkeley, School of Law
- Known for: Lawyer, musician, public speaker, writer

Paula Boggs (born 1959) is an American attorney, musician, public speaker, and former military officer. She is the leader of the Paula Boggs Band.

Boggs is the founder of Boggs Media, LLC, a business that manages her music, speaking, and other creative business activities. She is also a board member of numerous for-profit and non-profit organizations. She served as executive vice president, general counsel and secretary of law and corporate affairs at Starbucks Corporation from 2002 to 2012.

== Early life ==
Boggs is the oldest of four, and was born to parents Janice Barber and Nathaniel Boggs Jr. in Washington, D.C. She was raised Catholic. In 1972 her parents divorced and her mother took the kids to Europe, where she accepted teaching and administrator positions in Germany and Italy with the Department of Defense Schools System. Her father was awarded Howard University's first PhD in zoology in 1963.

== Career ==
Boggs served as vice president, legal, for products, operations and technology at Dell Computer Corporation, and as a partner at the law firm of Preston Gates & Ellis, LLP. She served as an sssistant U.S. sttorney, and in various capacities as an attorney for the U.S. Army, the Department of Defense and the White House Office of Legal Counsel. She served as a regular officer in the United States Army, and earned Army Airborne wings and a congressional appointment to the US Naval Academy, among America's first women to do so. She served in the policy-making body of the American Bar Association's House of Delegates. Boggs also served on the Iran-Contra task force during the Reagan administration.

- 1981-1988: regular officer in the army
- 1987-1988: staff attorney, White House Iran-Contra Legal Task Force
- 1988-1994: assistant U.S. attorney for the Western District of Washington
- 1994: staff director, Advisory Board on the Investigative Capability of Department of Defense
- 1995-1997: partner at the firm of Preston Gates & Ellis
- 1997-2002: vice president at Dell Corporation
- 2002-2012: executive vice president, general counsel, and secretary of Starbucks Corporation
- 2007–present: frontwoman, Paula Boggs Band

=== Memberships and affiliations ===
Boggs serves on the boards of Thinkific, Banzai International, and Newport Festivals Foundation.

She is a former board member of Avid, a leading provider of digital media technologies for media organizations and independent professionals, Fender Musical Instruments Corporation, a former governor of the American Bar Association, trustee emerita of the Johns Hopkins University, former board member and secretary of public radio station KEXP and former director of School of Rock LLC. She was named NASDAQ's top general counsel in 2009. Boggs served as a member of the White House Council for Community Solutions from 2010 to 2012. She is a former chair of Legal Aid for Washington, and a former board member of the Seattle Art Museum. She was appointed by President Barack Obama in 2013 as a member of the President's Committee on the Arts and the Humanities. She resigned from the President's Committee in August, 2017, co-signing a letter of resignation that said in reference to President Trump, "Ignoring your hateful rhetoric would have made us complicit in your words and actions." She also served on the board of governors for the national American Red Cross, and is a former board member of the Seattle Symphony Orchestra.

== Music career ==
Boggs has written and recorded four full-length albums fronting the Paula Boggs Band, and has recorded two EPs. Se owns over 30 U.S. copyrights. She is also a voting member and a governor of The Recording Academy, Pacific Northwest Chapter Board, and a member of the Americana Music Association. Paula Boggs Band is sponsored by Deering Banjos, Breedlove Guitars and Radial Engineering, Inc.

== Television appearances ==
In 2024, Boggs appeared on PBS News Hour. The segment, titled "How A Seasoned White House Lawyer Is Forging a New Musical Path," explores her transition from a legal career to a musical path.

== Writing career ==
Boggs's essays have appeared in national publications such as HuffPost and National Law Journal.

== Education ==
Boggs received a B.A. from Johns Hopkins University, in international studies, where she was on a four-year Reserve Officers' Training Corps (ROTC) scholarship and graduated first in her ROTC class. She then attended the University of California, Berkeley, School of Law. She also completed the U.S. Army Infantry Airborne School, and earlier received a congressional appointment to the U.S. Naval Academy.

== Awards and recognition ==
- "The Presidential Service Certificate for Honorable Service in the White House", 1988
- "Defense Meritorious Service Medal for Exceptionally Meritorious Service for the Armed Forces of the United States", 1987
- The Johns Hopkins University Distinguished Alumna Award, 2009
- U.S. Army Infantry Parachute Badge, 1980
- U.S. Department of Justice Special Achievement Award ("for sustained superior performance of duty" 1990, 1991)
- Secretary of Defense Award for Excellence, 1994
- American Bar Association Spirit of Excellence Award, 2006
- Sargent Shriver Award for Equal Justice, 2006
- National Bar Association Wiley A. Branton Award, 2008
- NASDAQ's Top General Counsel, 2009
- WNBA Seattle Storm Woman of Distinction, 2012
- Appointment to the U.S. Naval Academy Class of 1981, 1977
- Army ROTC Four-Year Scholarship (graduated first in Johns Hopkins University ROTC Class of 1981)
- Distinguished Military Graduate, 1981
- U.S. Army Honorable Discharge, 1988
- Seattle Mayor's Arts Award, 2018
- Honorary Doctor of Laws, Southwestern University (Georgetown, Texas), 2021
- Puget Sound Business Journal Board Director of the Year, 2021
- Savoy Magazine Most Influential Black Corporate Director, 2021
- Voting Member of Recording Academy since 2011
- Johns Hopkins University Heritage Award, 2023
- American Bar Association Stonewall Award, 2024
- Seattle Reign FC Legend Award, 2024
- Folk Alliance International Lifetime Member
