= James Boggs =

James Boggs may refer to:

- J. Caleb Boggs (1909–1993), politician who served as governor of Delaware and as a U.S. senator from Delaware
- James Boggs (activist) (1919–1993), American activist and husband of Grace Lee Boggs
- J. S. G. Boggs (1955–2017), American artist known for his drawings of money – Boggs Bills
- James Boggs (general) (1796–1862), brigadier general in the Virginia militia
- James Boggs (surgeon) (1740–1830), surgeon who migrated from New York to Nova Scotia during the American Revolution
