= Geoffrey Castle =

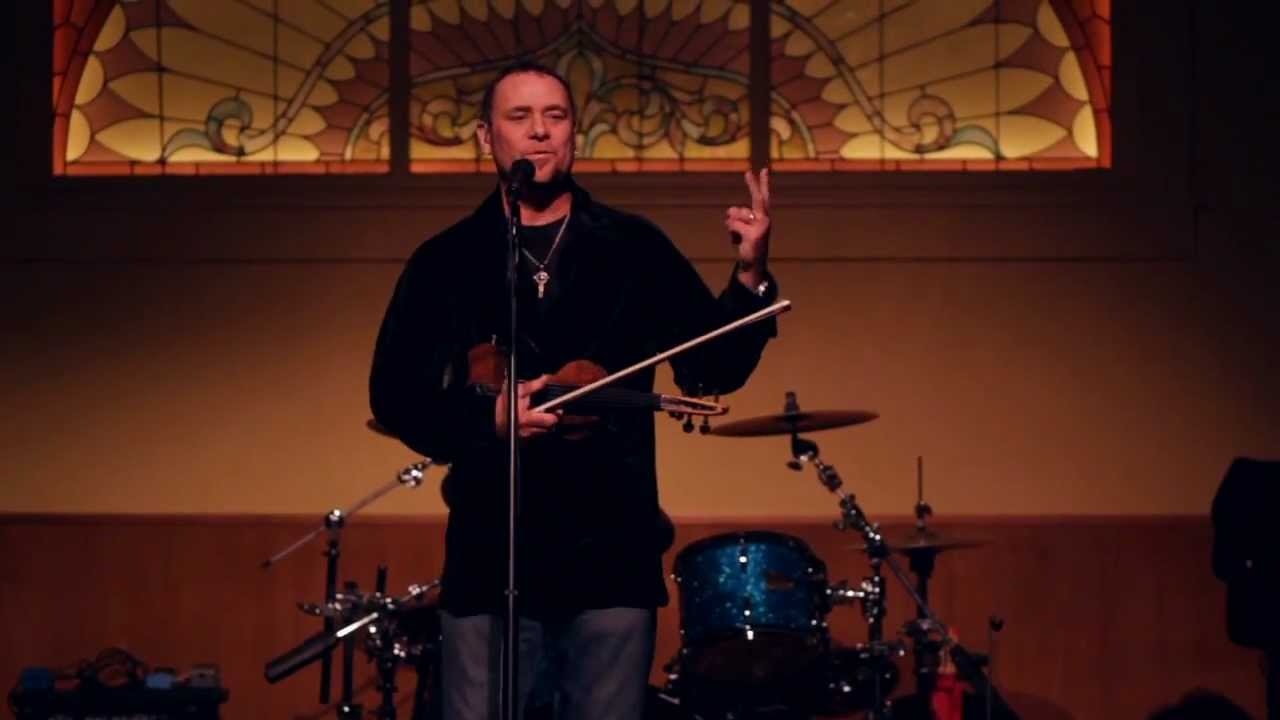

Background information
- Born: Jeffrey Sick
- Origin: Kirkland, WA
- Occupations: Musician, Violinist
- Instrument: Violin
- Website: www.geoffreycastle.com

Geoffrey Castle is a musician and violinist based in Kirkland, WA. Castle performs on the electric six-string violin music from a range of genres, including Hendrix, Celtic, Bluegrass, and Mozart.

== Early life and education ==
Castle, born Jeffrey Sick, began playing violin at age nine in New York City. He studied privately and performed in school orchestras, all-city and all-state orchestras, and in his high school marching band in Alexandria, Virginia. He began solo performances on the electric violin at the age of 17. Castle earned money as a street musician while attending Columbia University where he received a Cum Laude degree in English and Comparative Literature.

== Career ==
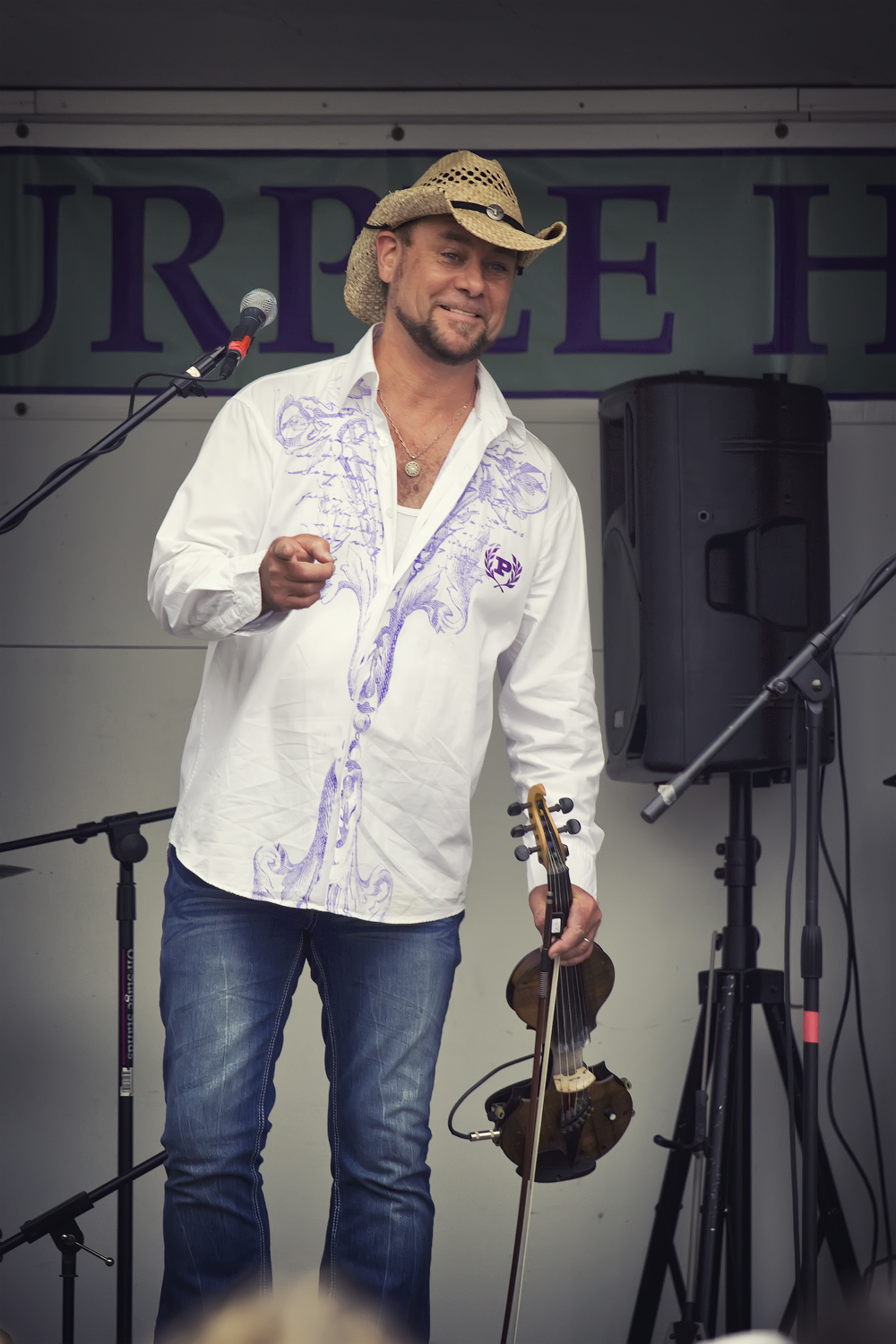

Castle has released seven albums on his own Twisted Fiddle Music label and four albums as a member of Children of the Revolution. As a session player he has contributed to many projects. In 1998 he played on Jeanette Alexander's first album, Still Point.

For several years Castle fronted the band Guarneri Underground. He co-produced a self-titled album for this group in 2000.

Castle has played as part of a variety of live productions, including the Broadway production of M. Butterfly to sharing the stage with members of YES, Heart and Queen, as well as regular local performances in Kirkland. Additionally, Castle has performed with visiting musicians from several countries, and since 2011 has played in concerts with Lucy Wu, jinghu player and singer from the Beijing Opera, in an "East Meets West: Violin Meets Jinghu" collaboration.

Castle organizes a series of "Celtic Christmas" and "St. Patrick's Day Celebration" concerts in theaters throughout the Northwest US. These performances are well attended and often sold out.

Geoffrey Castle's music, both as a band leader and a solo artist, has been featured on radio and TV across the US, and his violin work has been included in a number of movie and TV soundtracks.

== Community outreach ==
Castle's schedule includes performances and workshops at schools around the United States, raising funds for student music programs. Castle, along with 400 members of school orchestras in the Seattle area, set a world record for the most string players under one roof. He also plays yearly in All-State WMEA and All Northwest.

== Personal life ==
Castle is married to artist Shannon Connor Castle.

== Discography ==
=== Solo albums ===
- Groovalaya (1992)
- Street of Dreams (1995)
- New World (as Guarneri Underground) (1996)
- Captive (as Guarneri Underground) (1998)
- Wander This World (as Guarneri Underground) (2001)
- Mist on the Mountain (2006)
- Underhill's Angel: A Treasury Of Songs For The Season (2007)
- Streets of Inwood (2009)
- Live at the Triple Door 2009 (2009)
- Live at the Triple Door 2010 (2010)
- The Deep Well Sessions Vol 1 & Vol 2 (2012)

=== Contributing Musician ===
- Children Of The Revolution: It's All Greek To Me (2002)
- Children Of The Revolution: Chapter One (2003)
- Children Of The Revolution: Liberation (2003)
- Children Of The Revolution: Life, Love & Guantanamo Bay (2006)
- Children Of The Revolution: Children Of The Revolution (2008)
- Johnny Bacolas: The Sin (2011)
- Johnny Bacolas: Remake of "To Agalma" (2011)
- The Rumba Kings: The Instrumental and Vocal Sessions, Vol I (2018)
- The Rumba Kings: The Instrumental Sessions, Vol II (2019)
- The Rumba Kings: Dance with me (2020)
- The Rumba Kings: Mirame (2020)

=== DVDs ===
- Live at the Triple Door (2009)
- The Deep Well Sessions (2012)
