= Xaagá =

Town in Oaxaca, Mexico

Coordinates: 16°54′N 96°19′W

Xaagá (pronounced Saaga) is a small town South-West from the town of San Pablo Villa de Mitla in the Valles Centrales of the State of Oaxaca, Mexico. It is about 10 km (as the crow flies) far away from Hierve el Agua. It is located at an elevation of 1,745 meters above sea level.
