= The Bog =

Disused lead mine in Shropshire, England

Coordinates: 52.575°N 2.951°W

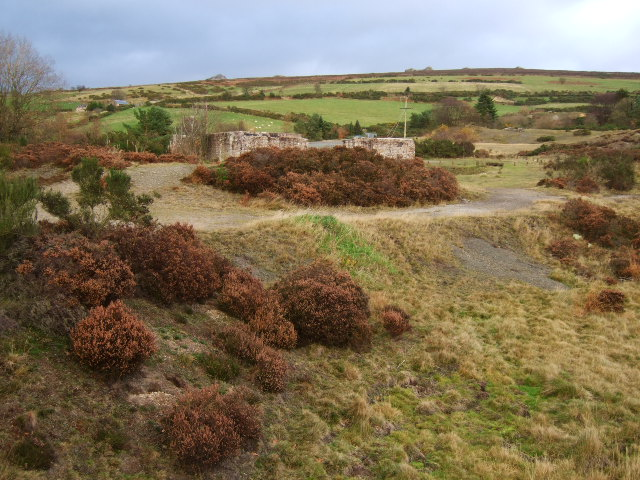
Remains of one of the buildings at The Bog's lead mine

The Bog is a former mining community in Shropshire, England. It lies 6 miles (10 km) north of Bishops Castle, east of the A488, at grid reference SO355979. It was once a busy village with over 200 buildings. Now only a few remain. The local mines produced lead and barytes until the early 20th century.

The mine at The Bog and the adjacent Stiperstones outcrop were only viable because of a geological movement; over time the movement of the tectonic plates landed at this site, combined with the movement of the earth it crumpled the layers and the softest layers were then eroded away. After mining stopped, the undisturbed remnants provided a range of wildlife habitats: birds nest in the old buildings, bats roost in the old mine tunnels, and reservoirs and ponds are ideal for aquatic life.

== Visitor centre ==
The Bog Mine Visitor Centre, the main facility for visitors to the Stiperstones, is housed in the former village school and retains its old interior design. It provides historical information about the past workers, mining, and present-day work to restore the landscape. Facilities at the centre include toilets and car parking (with facilities for the disabled including reserved parking, toilets and ramps). Activities include walking, with two main circular walks called Mucklewick Walk and Flenny Bank Walk and a variety of riding routes.

Improvements to the building, made possible by a Heritage Lottery Grant, include increasing the understanding of the mine remnants, providing new interpretation within the visitor centre, and the installation of a landscape painting by a local artist of the Stiperstones. The centre was threatened with closure in 2009, as a new co-ordinator and more volunteering staff were needed. However, additional staff were found and the visitor centre is still open and running, staffed by the Bog Visitor Centre Volunteer Group. The building is the only one surviving in use from The Bog Village which was demolished in 1972.

The centre contains a framed tribute to 26 men and women from The Bog and nearby Pennerley who served in World War II, of whom two men died in the war and the last survivor, a airwoman, died in 2010. Headed "Lest We Forget" and bearing photographs of each named person, it was compiled and funded by local man Clifford Evans, who unveiled it in the latter year.
