= Bog pine =

Bog pine is a common name for several trees and may refer to:

- Halocarpus bidwillii, native to New Zealand
- Pinus uncinata, native to northern Europe
