= Paal Bog =

UNICEF Chairman (1980–81)

Chairman of UNICEF
- In office 1980–1981
- Preceded by: Zaki Hasan
- Succeeded by: Dragan Matelijak

Paal Bog (born 5 December 1919 in Nærøy Municipality, died 19 September 2002 in Nedstrand Municipality) was a Norwegian economist, civil servant and diplomat. He served as Chairman of UNICEF from 1980 to 1981.

Bog earned the cand.oecon. degree in economics at the University of Oslo in 1946, and worked at Statistics Norway (SSB) until 1953. He then joined the Norwegian Customs Service, but later returned to SSB. He worked for the India Fund's Indo-Norwegian Project from 1953 to 1955. He was later an assistant director and director of a department in SSB. From 1969 to 1975 he worked for the Norwegian Agency for Development Cooperation, and in 1975 he became Director-General for Development Aid in the Ministry of Foreign Affairs. He served as Ambassador to Kenya, Ethiopia and Uganda with residence in Nairobi from 1982 to 1988.

He became a Commander of the Order of St. Olav in 1987.

Bog was married to the women's studies scholar Harriet Hinsch (later known as Harriet Holter) from 1944 to 1950. From 1954 to 1968 he was married to the painter Kari Robak (1927–2014). Paal Bog has a son from his second marriage, Ola Bog (1955 – ).
