= Mary Boggs =

American muralist

- Boggs in 1946
- Born: Mary Ross; July 3, 1920; St. Johnsbury, Vermont
- Died: June 4, 2002 (aged 81); Bethel, Vermont
- Other names: Mary Ross Boggs, Mary Ross Townley
- Occupations: artist, writer

Mary Boggs (July 3, 1920 – June 4, 2002), also known as Mary Ross Boggs and in her later career as a writer as Mary Ross Townley, was an American muralist and textbook author. She participated in the art projects for the New Deal's Section of Painting and Sculpture creating the post office mural for Newton, Mississippi, and a collection of her watercolors was held at the Carville Marine Hospital.

== Early life ==
Mary Ross was born on July 3, 1920, in St. Johnsbury, Vermont to Dorothy (née Ashley) and Ralph Ross. She was the granddaughter of Dr. George H. Ashley of Harrisburg, Pennsylvania. Boggs studied at the Pennsylvania Academy of the Fine Arts.

== Career ==
Prior to her marriage, Ross had begun working as a New Deal artist and had won a commission. She married Franklin Boggs on December 21, 1940, in Wynnewood, Pennsylvania, and the couple subsequently had four children. In 1941, she and Franklin, who were living in Knoxville, Tennessee, won the competition to complete "Economic Life in Newton in the Early 1940s" for the post office mural in Newton, Mississippi. The painting was completed as an oil on canvas and then applied to the post office wall. That same year, her watercolor "Children's Sunday" was selected for an exhibit at the Whitney Museum of American Art.

After the New Deal art projects ended, the couple moved to Wisconsin, where by 1958, Franklin was the chair of the Art department at Beloit College. The Wright Museum of Art there houses her Judy and Summer (1951). Boggs taught art classes for the Beloit Art League and traveled extensively throughout Argentina and Mexico. She exhibited works in Philadelphia, Beloit, Milwaukee, Knoxville and Washington D.C. A collection of Boggs' watercolors were held by the Carville Marine Hospital in Carville, Louisiana, and she had works held in private collections. Boggs divorced Franklin in 1958 and later married Hugh Townley, who had left Beloit for Boston University. She changed her professional name to Mary Ross Townley and began publishing art textbooks. A review of Another Look!, a 1978 curriculum-kit of art textbooks for younger children and their teachers, gives some insight into Mary Ross Townley's concern with imparting the fundamentals of art and the development of visual awareness by a structured, sequenced programme of work, building on itself. In 1989, when her husband retired from Brown University, they moved to Bethel, Vermont.

== Death and legacy ==
Townley died on June 4, 2002, in Bethel, Vermont.
