= Stanley Boggs =

American archaeologist (1910–1991)

Stanley Boggs (1910–1991) was an American archaeologist who restored numerous archeological sites in Central America.
