= Tourism in El Salvador =

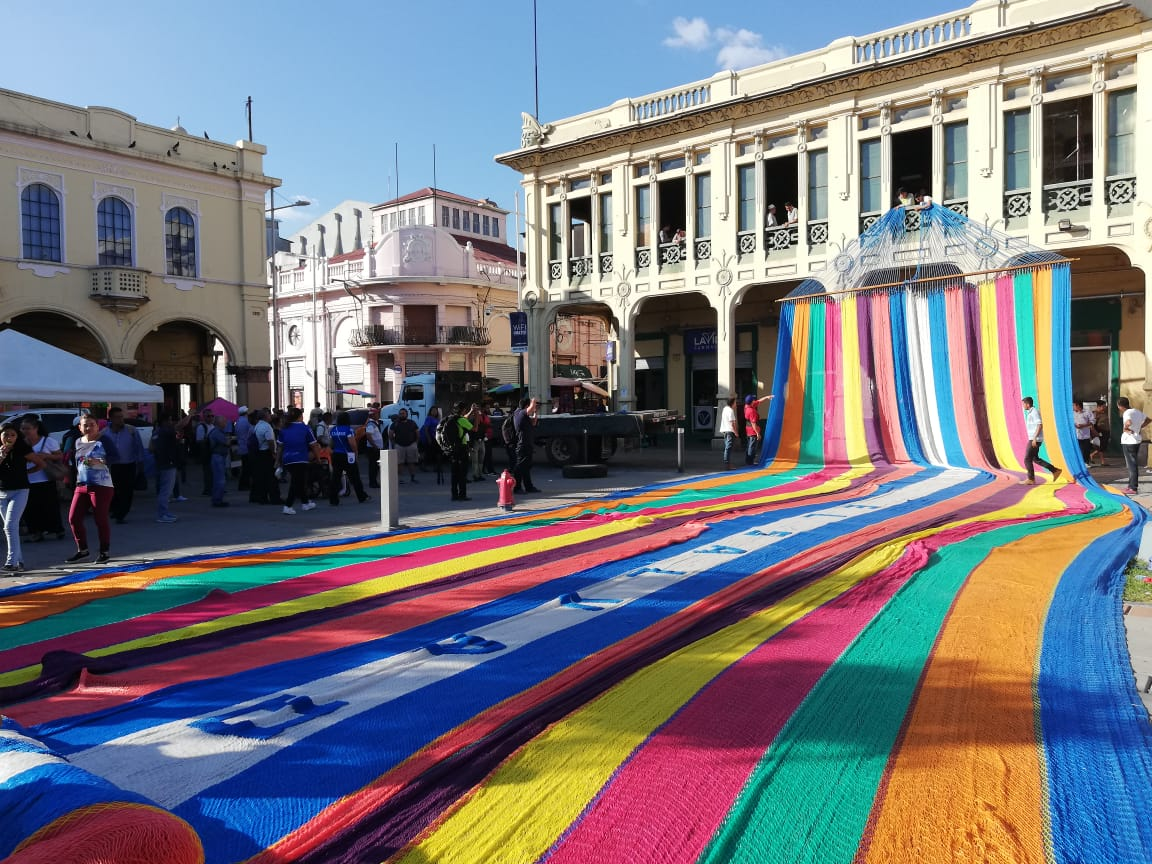
"The largest hammock in the world" made annually in the district. Exhibition in the Historic Center of San Salvador.

Tourism accounts for a large part of El Salvador's economy. El Salvador has many natural attractions including beaches. El Salvador offers many lush forests shrouded in cool temperatures with abundant wildlife and scenic mountain-top vistas. El Salvador also has great potential in the field of cultural tourism; with over 2,000 known archaeological sites, mostly of the Maya and Olmec cultures. These sites are of international interest for their easy access and well-preserved remains.

While tourism has become increasingly important to the Salvadoran economy, it has experienced periods of boom and bust cycles that are largely attributed to the nation's safety or lack thereof. El Salvador previously had a high level of violent crime; however, since the Salvadoran gang crackdown in 2022, the country is experiencing a significant decline in violent crime, making it the safest country in Central America. This has led to more foreign investment in tourist infrastructure.

== Volume of tourism ==
Tourist arrivals of 2024 in %

Yearly tourist arrivals in millions

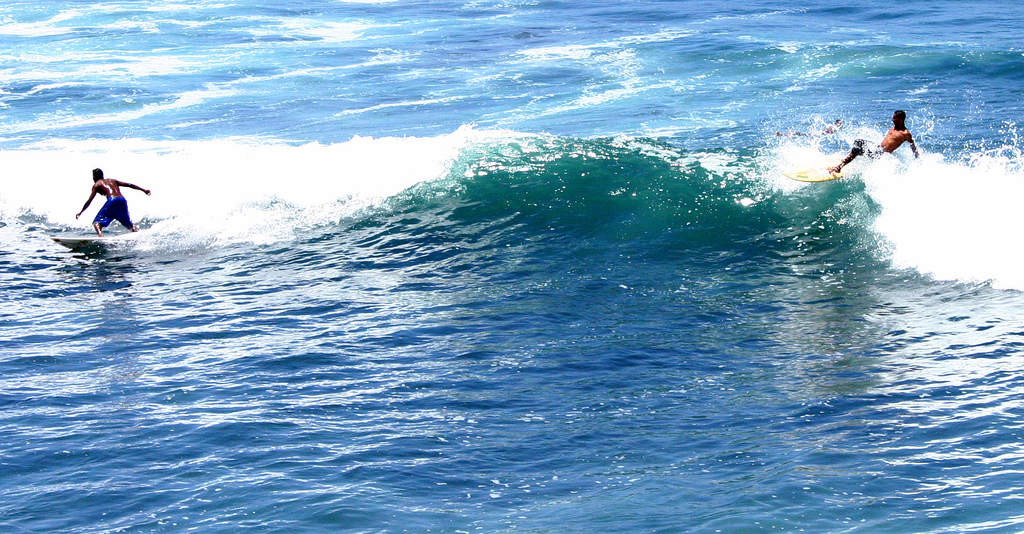
El Salvador is a popular destination for surf tourism due to the large waves present in the Pacific Ocean.

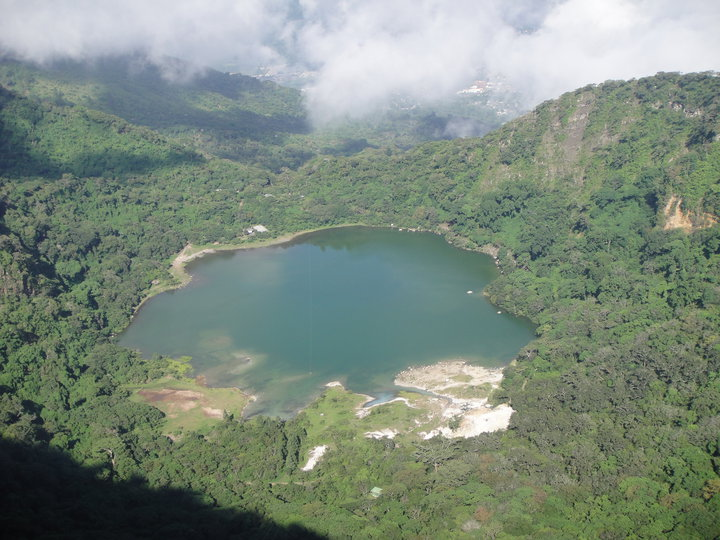
Alegría Lake "The Emerald of America"

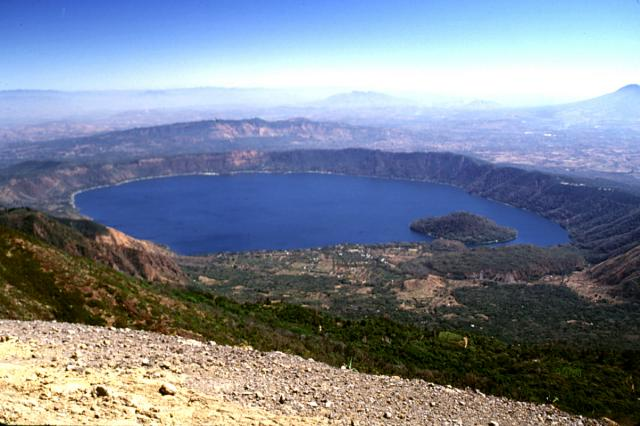
Lake Coatepeque in the west of the country

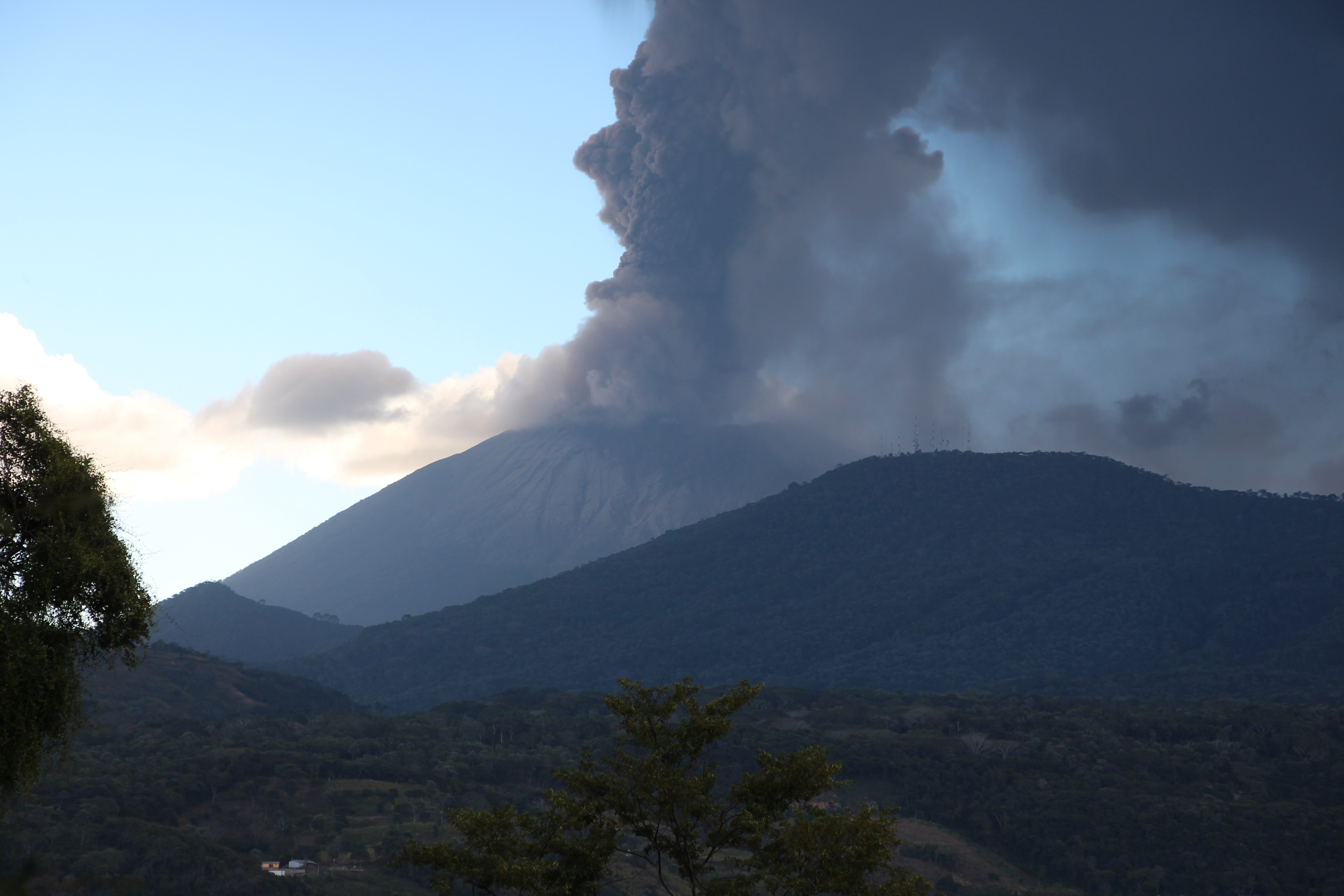
The San Miguel (volcano) during the eruption of December 29, 2013

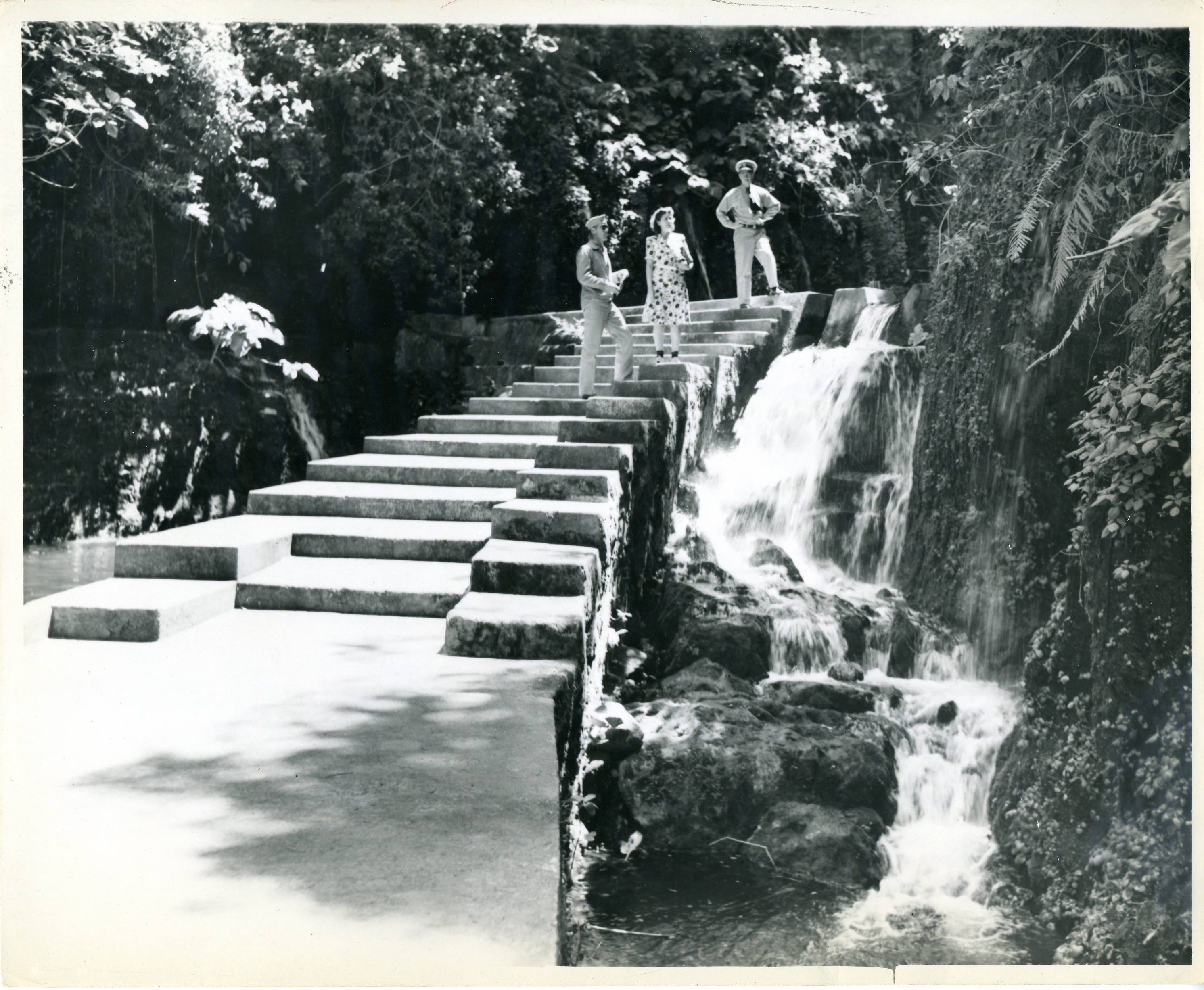
the photographer snapped this picture of the Los Chorros Water Falls, which is only a few miles from San Salvador

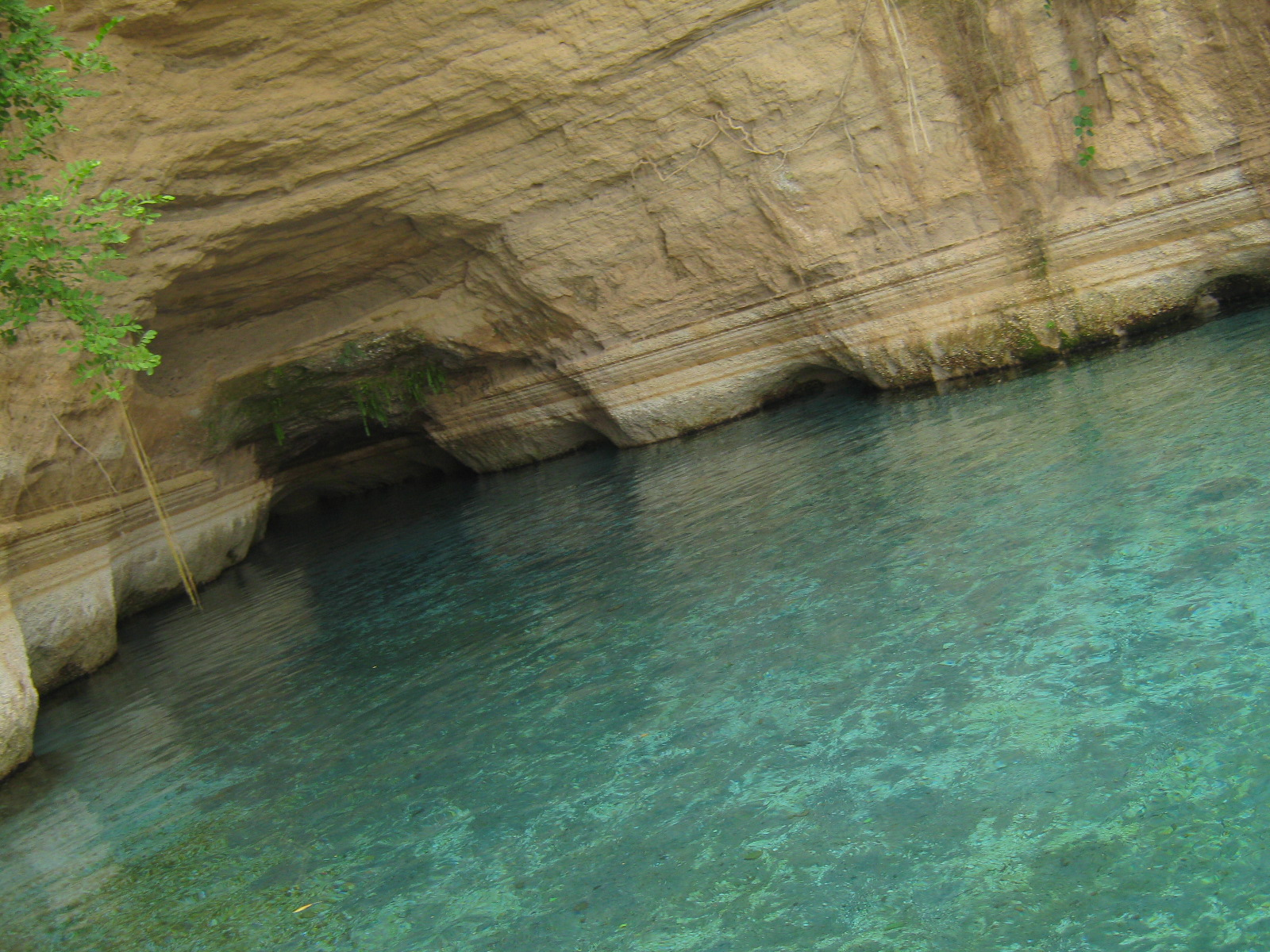
Moncagua, San Miguel

In 1994, 181,000 tourists visited El Salvador, generating US$28.8 million in tourism revenue. Three years later, a specialized governing body was created called Salvadoran Tourism Corporation (Corporación Salvadoreña de Turismo) (Corsatur), and in 1997, 387,000 tourists visited, generating US$74.7 million.

Since then, tourism has seen a significant increase over previous years. In 2004, tourism injected US$424.7 million into the economy. El Salvador created the Ministry of Tourism to direct the policy of the development of the sector. The 2005 Tourism Act (Ley del Turismo), provided tax incentives for new investments in the sector to promote momentum within the tourism sector.

In 2008, 1.8 million tourists visited the country, generating about US$720 million, according to the Ministry of Tourism.

The growth has not been based on attracting resort tourism, but rather in spurring investment in local businesses and Salvadorans living in US returning to their country.

Tourism contributed US$855.5 million to El Salvador's GDP in 2013. This represented 3.5% of the total GDP.

Tourism directly supported 80,500 jobs in 2013. This represented 3.1% of total employment in El Salvador. In 2013, tourism indirectly supported 210,000 jobs, representing 8.1% of total employment in El Salvador.

It was estimated that 1,394,000 international tourists would visit El Salvador in 2014.

Despite advances, it is still behind of other established tourist destinations such as Costa Rica and Guatemala.

Cited problems hindering the success of international tourism include the lack of promotion abroad and adequate infrastructure, though El Salvador benefits from the remodeling of Comalapa International Airport.

== Historical Monuments ==
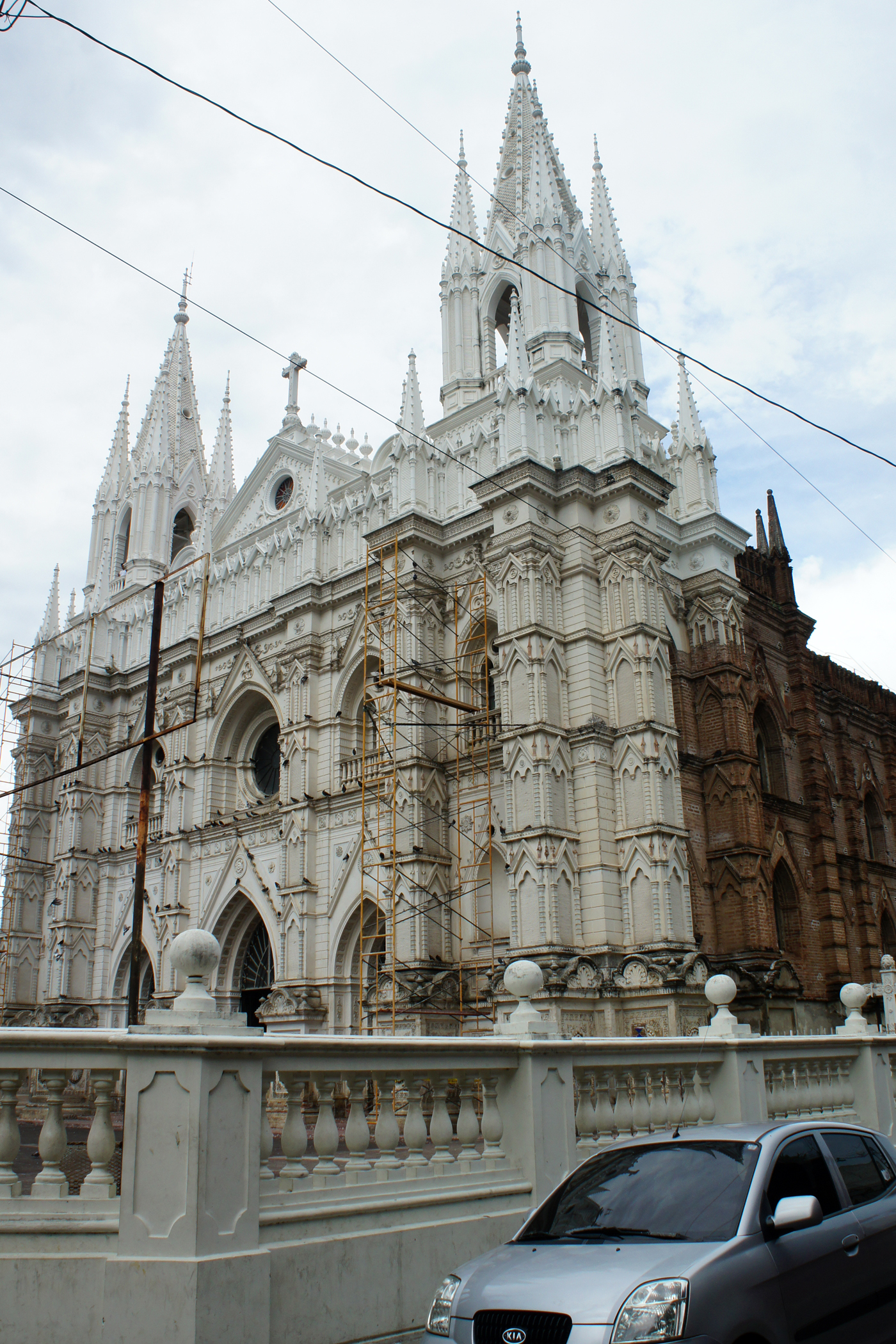
Cathedral of Santa Ana, in 2012

=== National Palace ===
The government of Captain General Gerardo Barrios created the idea of a National Palace, whose construction was carried out in 1866 to 1870, by Don Idelfonso Marín and José Dolores Melara, however, on 19 November 1889 a fire reduced it to rubble.

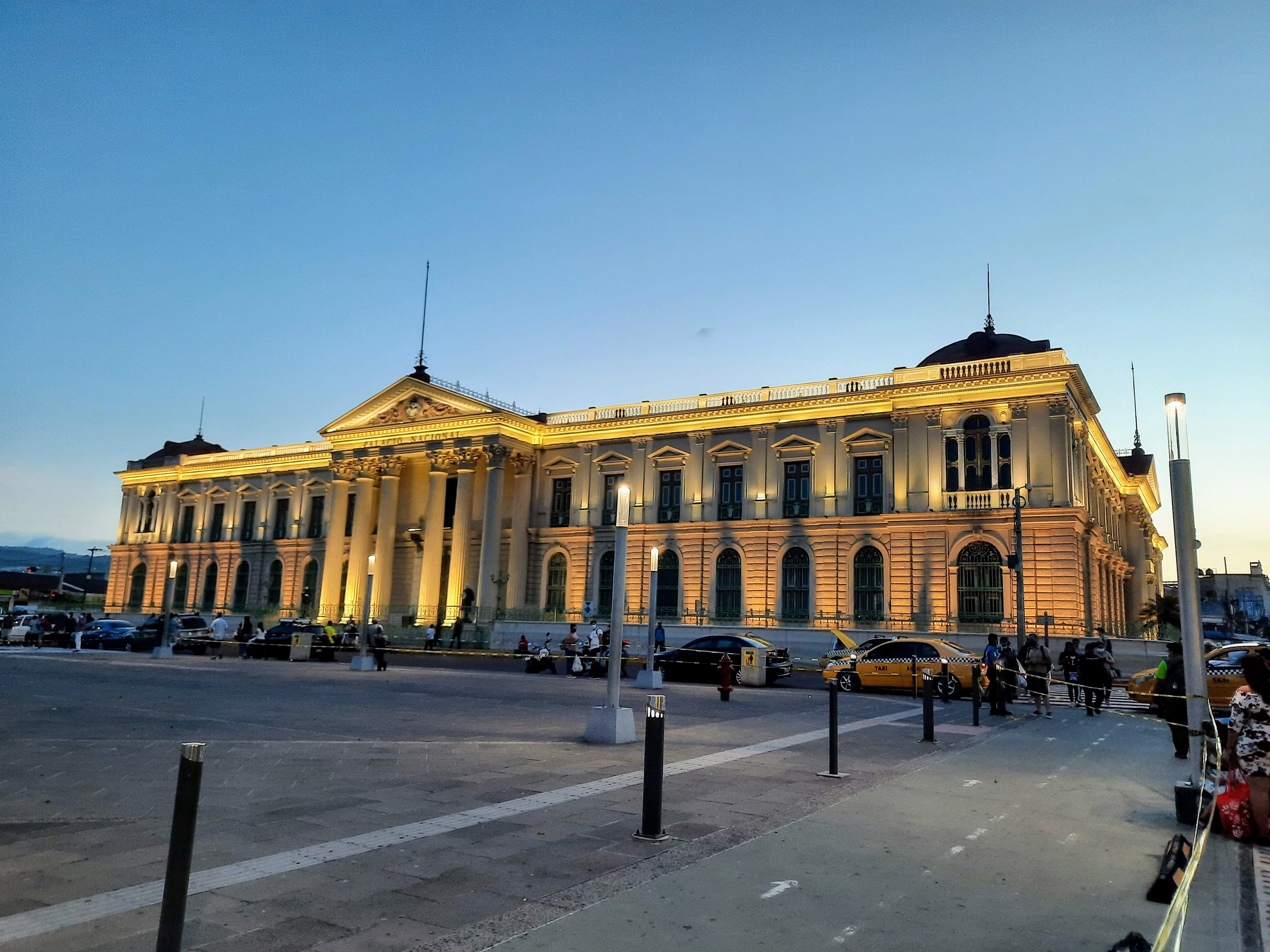
The National Palace

The current National Palace was designed by the engineer José Emilio Alcaine and constructed from 1905 to 1911 under the direction of José María Peralta Lagos, Don Pascasio González served as foreman, and construction materials were imported from Germany, Belgium, Italy and other countries.

On 13 December 1974, by legislative decree 165, it declared a national monument the Blue Room (Salón Azul) and the adjacent rooms and 10 July 1980, the Revolutionary Council of the Government, by Decree No. 116, declares the National Palace as "National Monument". It has four main halls in colors red, blue, yellow, pink, and 101 other rooms.

=== The Monument of Christopher Columbus and Queen Isabella ===
Both monuments are located side of the entrance of the main gate of the National Palace on Cuscatlán Avenue. They were unveiled on 12 October 1924 to place the 432º anniversary of the discovery of America. Both monuments were donated to the Salvadoran people by the King of Spain, Alfonso XIII, and officially handed over to the Government of El Salvador, during the administration of President Dr. Alfonso Quiñónez Molina.

=== Casa de las Academias ===
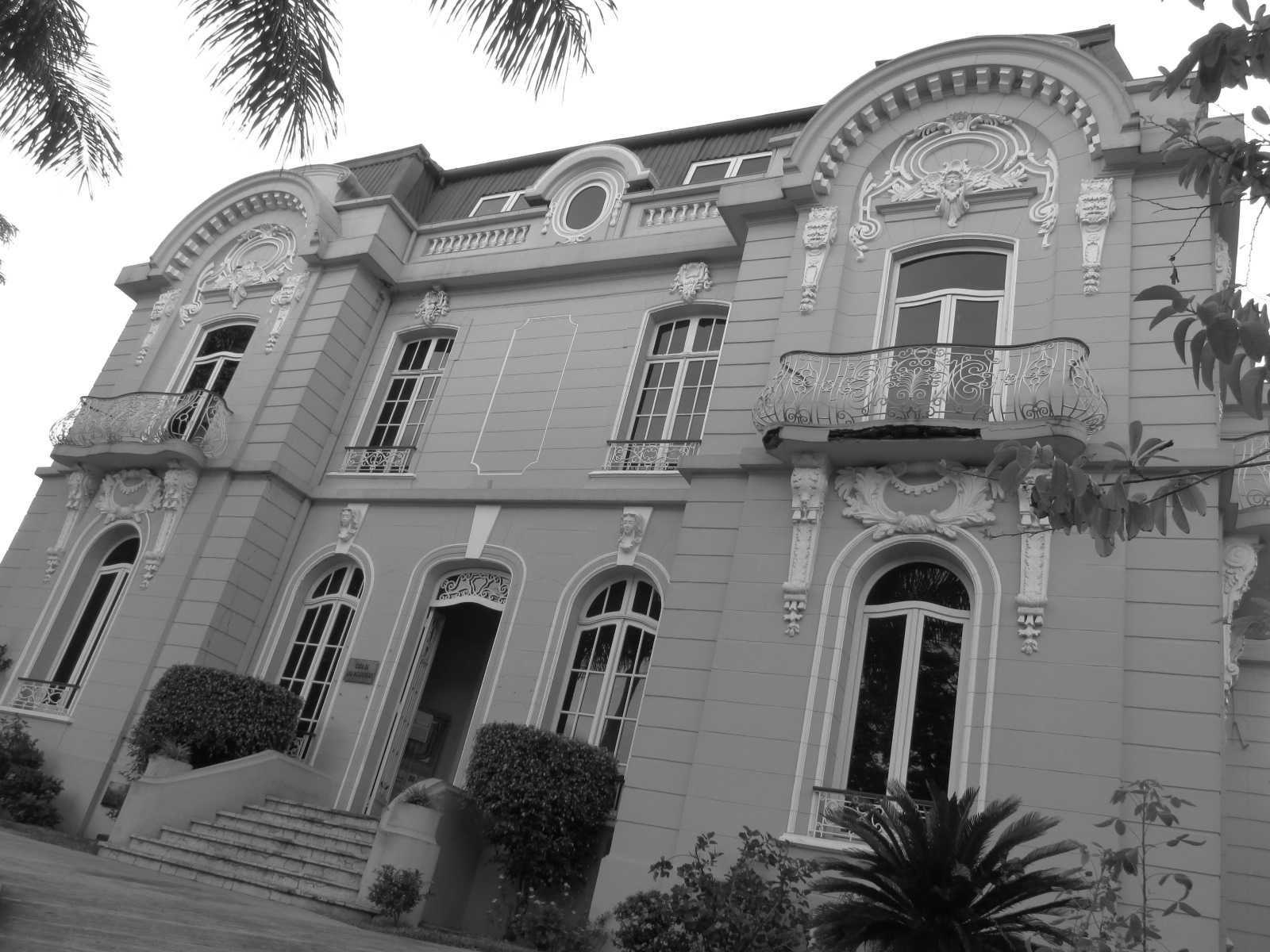
Casa Dueñas

The former Casa Dueñas, owned of Dueñas family, was unoccupied for years. Then, in 1930 and 1933 was leased by the Legation of Mexico (at that time were not Embassies). From 1935 to 1957 the Legation of the United States rented the house for residence of the plenipotentiary ministers. And they lived there six American representatives diplomats, with occasional guests such as former presidents Richard Nixon and Lyndon B. Johnson and Senator Robert F. Kennedy and film artists Clark Gable and Tony Curtis.

== Beaches ==
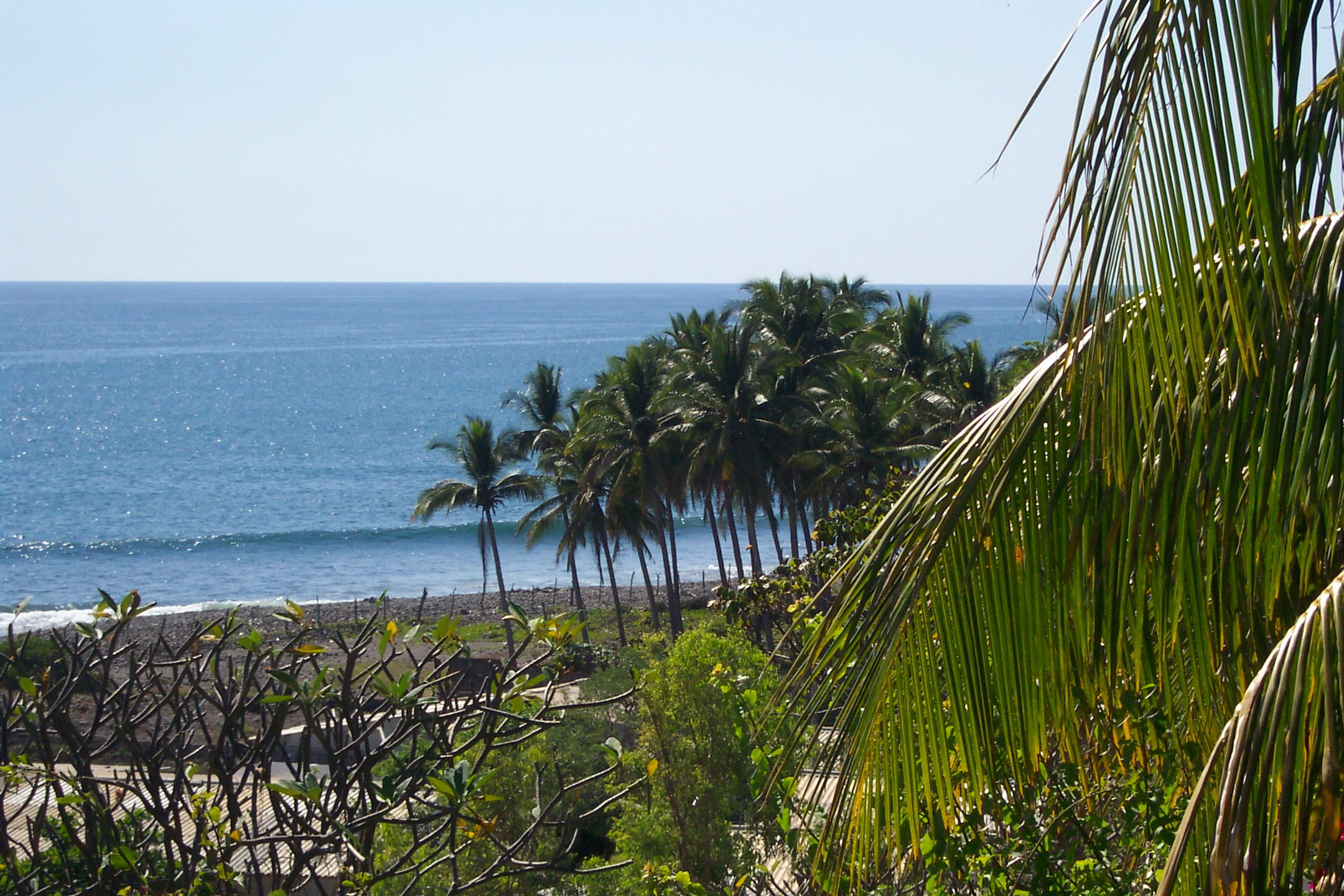
Beach of municipality of La Libertad

El Salvador also has plentiful sunlight and beaches. Some of the areas most visited by tourists are those of La Libertad, in the central region of the country. There are a number of beaches and a variety of hotels and restaurants.

Beaches like El Tunco or El Sunzal are used for surfing. The Jiquilisco Bay located in the Usulután, is one of the most sought-after destinations in the country for its natural diversity.

== Environmental aspects ==
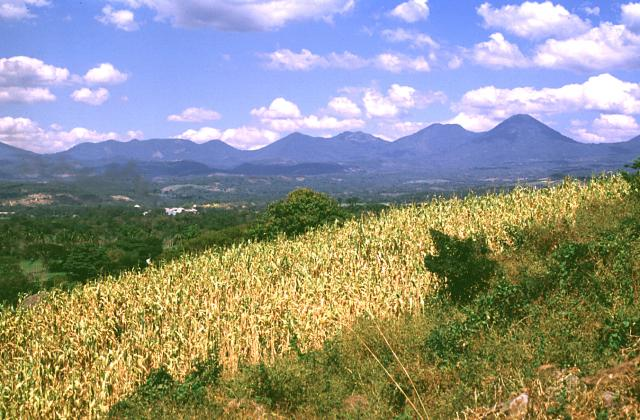
View of the mountain Apaneca-Ilamatepec

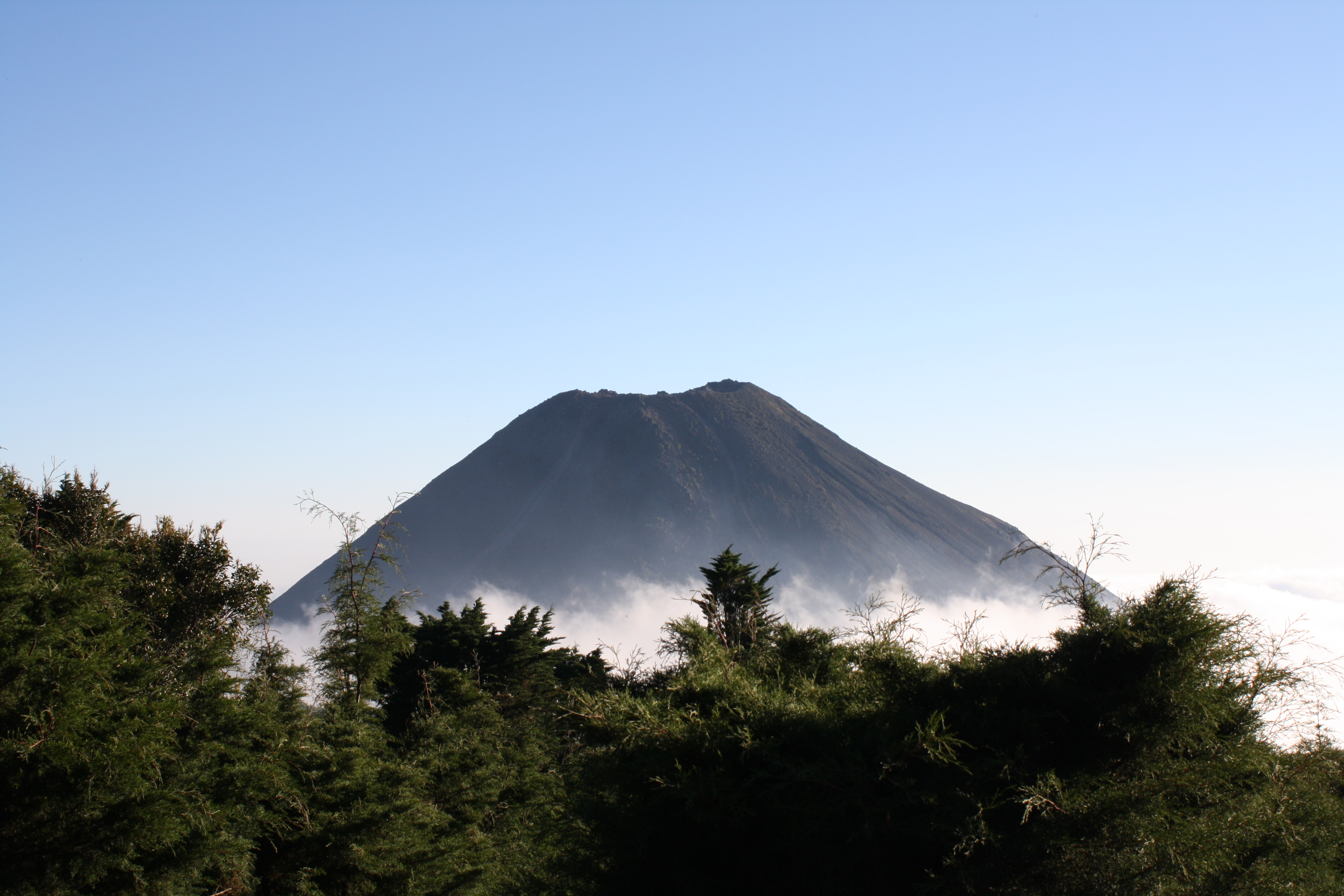
Izalco (volcano), "The Lighthouse of the Pacific"

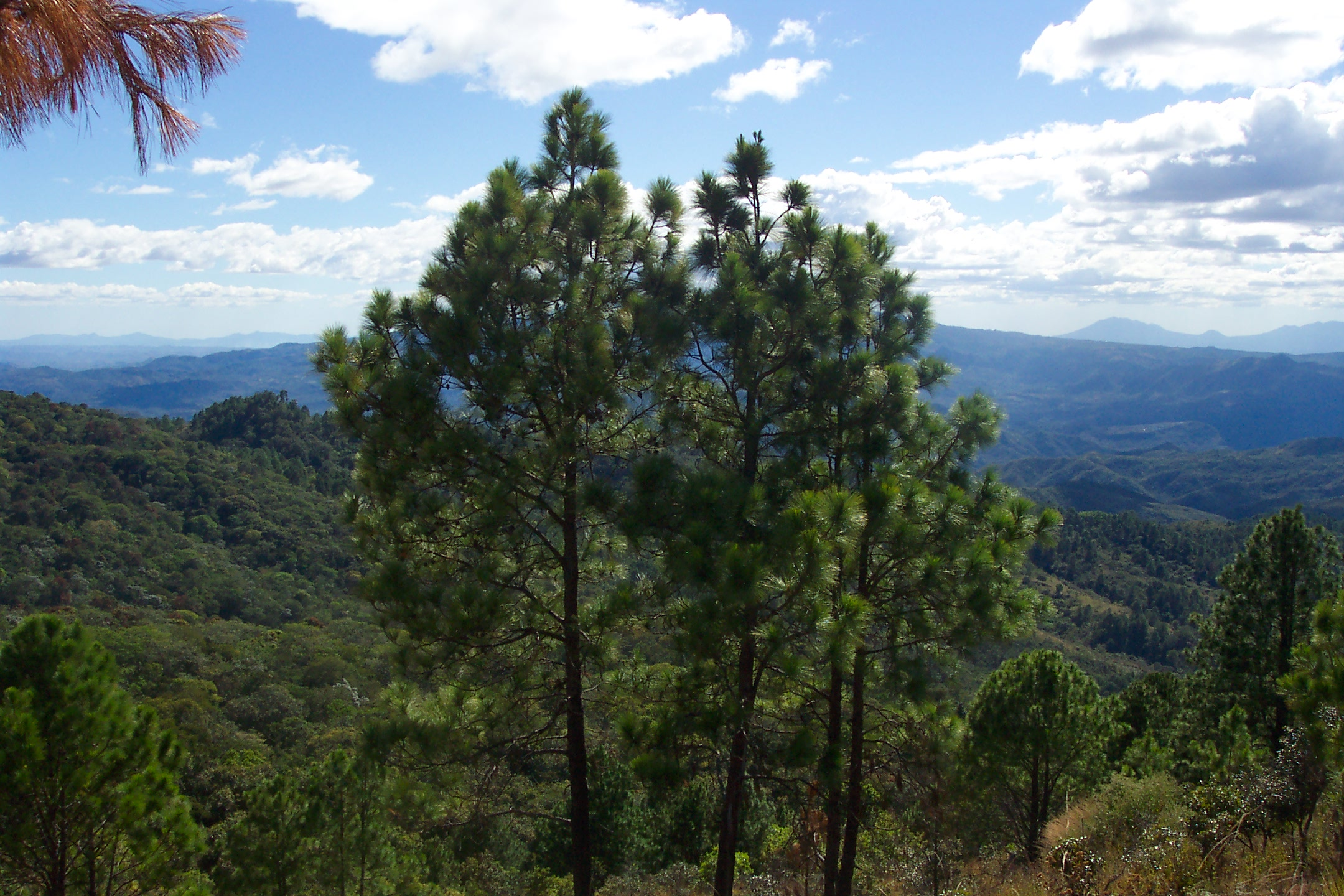
View from the town of Perquín in the department of Morazán

In recent decades, biodiversity and ecological balance of the country have suffered due to the harsh impacts of urban planning and pollution. The increasing population concentration in urban areas has led to an increased bonding of the population in the South and Southwest regions of the country (especially in the Metropolitan Area of San Salvador). These areas are a fragile ecosystem, because they channel and feed the aquifers of the southern corridor of the country, limiting the flow of water from underground sources.

The main causes of pollution in El Salvador are mainly transportation, industry, controlled burning, and garbage incineration (about half of the garbage collected in the metropolitan area of San Salvador is not recycled). Furthermore, the vast majority of households use firewood for cooking.

Lately, El Salvador has had a significant growth in the field of renewable energy, specifically with hydroelectric and geothermal power, as organizations and the government are working to conserve and reforest the country.

== Ecotourism ==
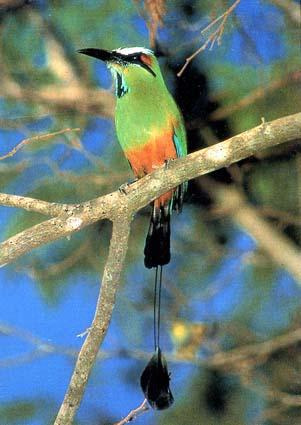
Torogoz, national bird of El Salvador

El Salvador has a range of greatly important national parks, both for their quantity and their uniqueness. The most important ecological areas are, among others:

- The National Nature Reservation Forest El Impossible
- The Cerro Verde National Park
- Montecristo National Park
- The Conchagua Volcano National Park
- The Walter T. Deininger Park
- The Jocotal Lake
- The Forest of San Diego
- El Forest of Nancuchiname

The Impossible Forest (Spanish: El Imposible) is located south of the department of Ahuachapán, on the mountain range of Apaneca, and covers an area of 3,130 hectares. It is highly inaccessible, to which it owes its name, and offers shelter to many animal species (insects, birds, mammals, and reptiles) and native vegetation, including the Siete Camisas Rojo (Guapira Witsbereri) and Amarante Silvestre ( Parathesis Congesta), two tree species unknown to science until recently.

From Cerro Verde National Park, located in the department of Santa Ana, the Izalco volcano can be seen, as well as the Santa Ana volcano and Lake Coatepeque. In this area, there are more than 127 species of birds and other animals.

Montecristo National Park, located north of the department of Santa Ana, comprises one of the last cloud forests of El Salvador, consisting of oaks, pines, and cypresses, where it finds its habitat howler monkeys, black shrews, anteaters, white-tailed deer, and pumas.

Another exceptional faunal refuge constitutes Walter T. Deininger Park, where the hunting ban has led to the population of coyotes, deer, tucanoan, and iguanas. Waterfowl such as tree ducks, red-beaked redfish, and charancuacos are found in Jocotal Lake.

The Trifinio region is a large forested area shared by El Salvador, Guatemala, and Honduras. It encompasses several river systems and local villages, where traditional Salvadoran culture and lifestyles continue to be practiced.

The Ministry of Tourism (MITUR) and the Salvadoran Tourism Corporation (CORSATUR) structure the country's travel offerings across defined geographic circuits and thematic routes:

Primary Thematic Routes and Geographic Tourism Corridors of El Salvador
Circuit / Tourist Route	Primary Departments	Core Geographic & Cultural Assets	Dominant Tourism Segment
Ruta de las Flores	Ahuachapán and Sonsonate	Cordillera de Apaneca towns (Juayúa, Apaneca, Ataco), shade-grown coffee plantations, artisanal textile workshops, and geothermal springs	Cultural tourism, agro-tourism, and culinary festivals
Surf City / Coastal Corridor	La Libertad, La Paz, and Usulután	Pacific point breaks (El Tunco, El Sunzal, Punta Roca), marine turtle conservation sites, and the Jiquilisco Bay biosphere	Adventure tourism, competitive surfing, and coastal recreation
Ruta Maya / Archaeological Circuit	La Libertad and Santa Ana	Pre-Columbian sites including the Joya de Cerén agricultural village, the ceremonial center of San Andrés, and the pyramidal complex of Tazumal in Chalchuapa	Heritage tourism and Mesoamerican archaeology
Ruta de la Paz (Peace Route)	Morazán	Historic settlements of Perquín, memorial landscapes, pine-oak mountain trails, and the Rio Sapo river basin	Historical memory tourism, eco-hiking, and birdwatching
Volcanoes Complex (Los Volcanes)	Santa Ana and Sonsonate	Protected peaks of Santa Ana Volcano (Ilamatepec), Izalco, and Cerro Verde overlooking Lake Coatepeque	Trekking, mountaineering, and volcanic geotourism

== Archaeological sites ==
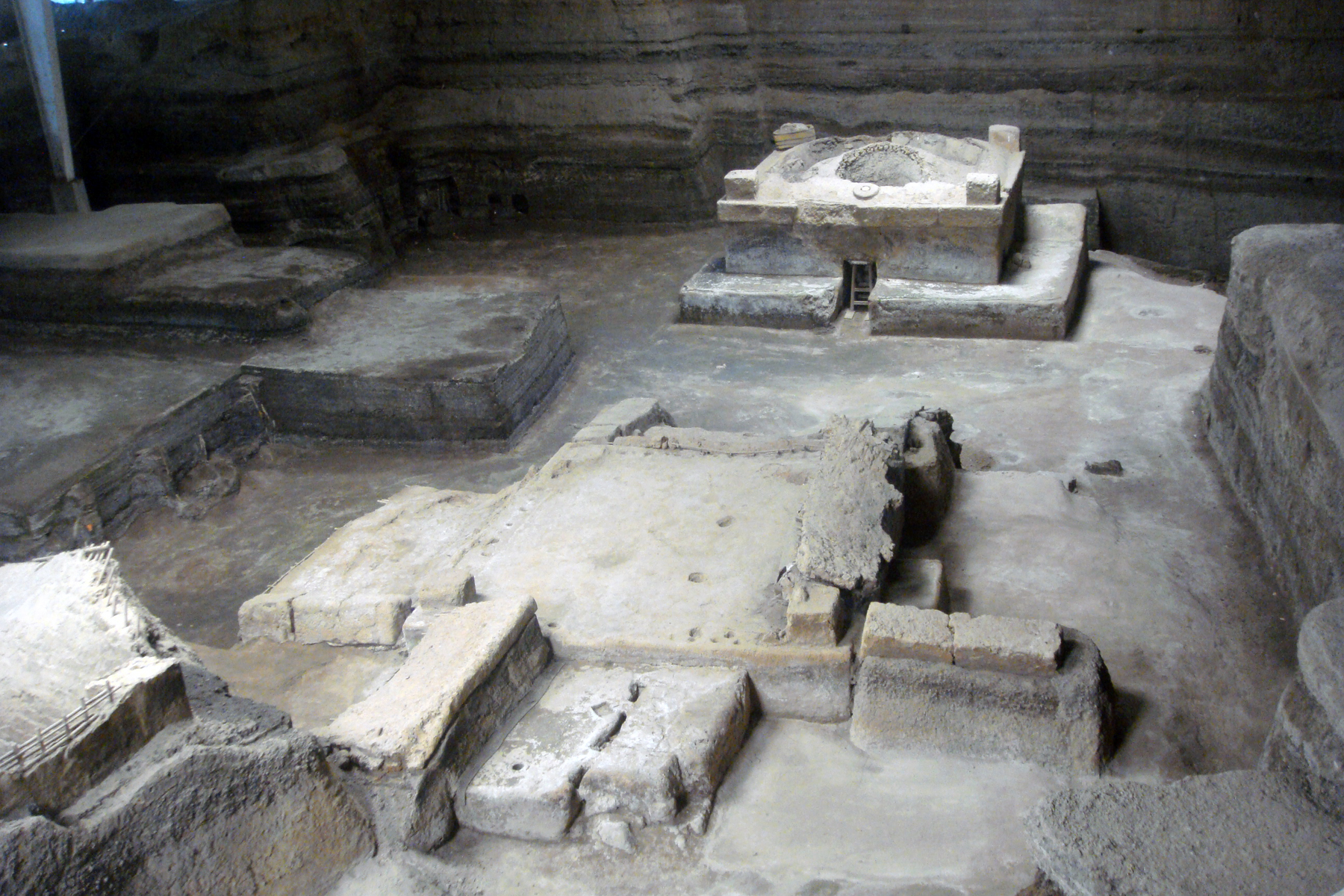
Joya de Cerén ancient Mayan settlement.

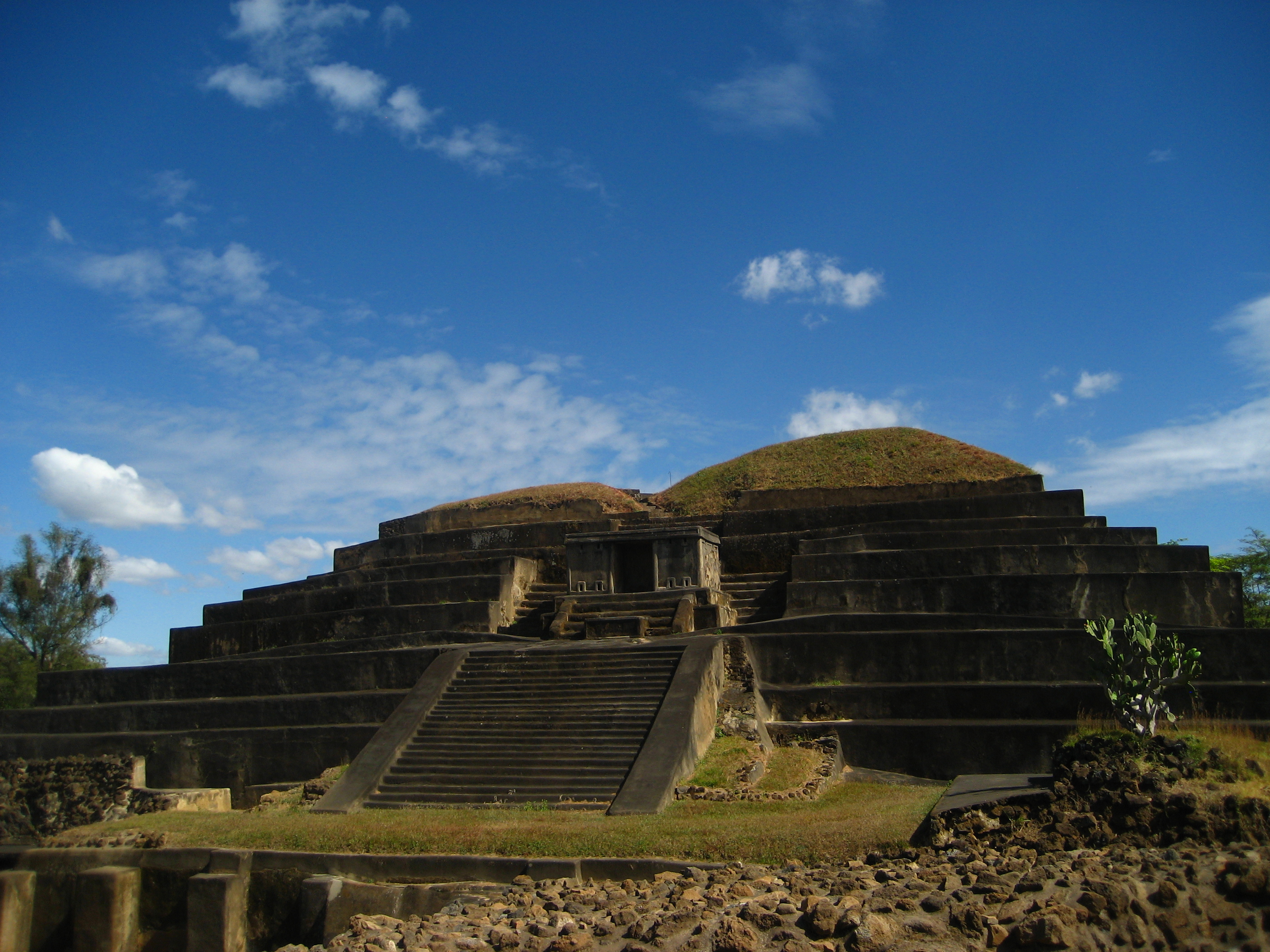
Tazumal Ruins in Santa Ana, El Salvador.

El Salvador also has exceptional potential in the field of cultural tourism, with over 2,000 known archaeological sites, and samples of Maya and Olmec cultures, mainly. They stand out for their importance the archaeological remains of the Pyramids of San Andrés, Joya de Cerén, Cihuatán, Quelepa, Tazumal and Tehuacán.

The Tazumal is located in Chalchuapa, Santa Ana Department where it was built by a culture still not defined as shares Mayoid elements of the Guatemalan highlands and the valley of Copán in the early Classic period (around 260). It made many changes over the centuries in the end it became a splendid place showing the great culture of El Salvador. The Kazuma remained independent after the fall of Copán and the arrival of the Pipes.

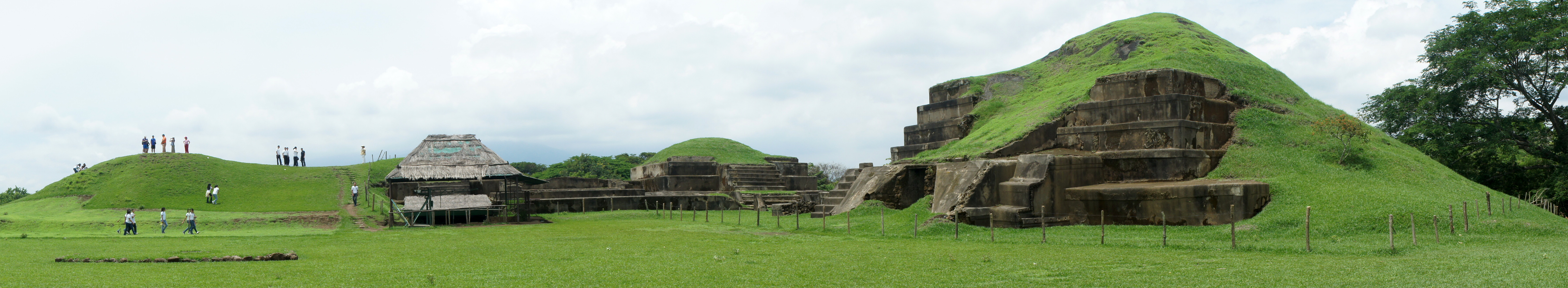
Panoramic view of the Acropolis at the archaeological site of San Andrés

== See also ==
- Salvadoran cuisine
- Culture of El Salvador
