= San Andrés (El Salvador) =

Archaeological site in El Salvador

Coordinates: 13°48′02″N 89°23′22″W

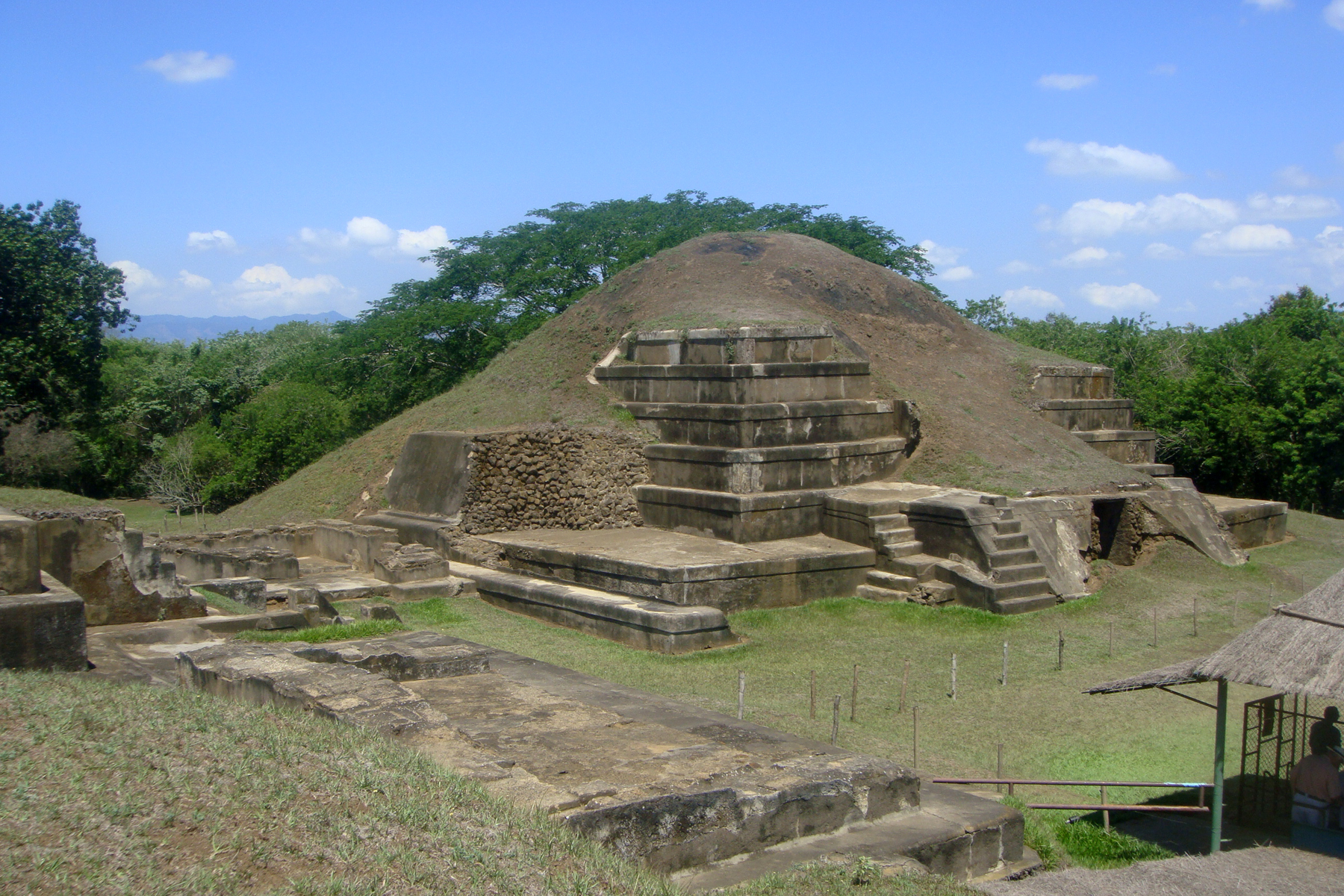
Main pyramid at the Acrópolis site, San Andrés

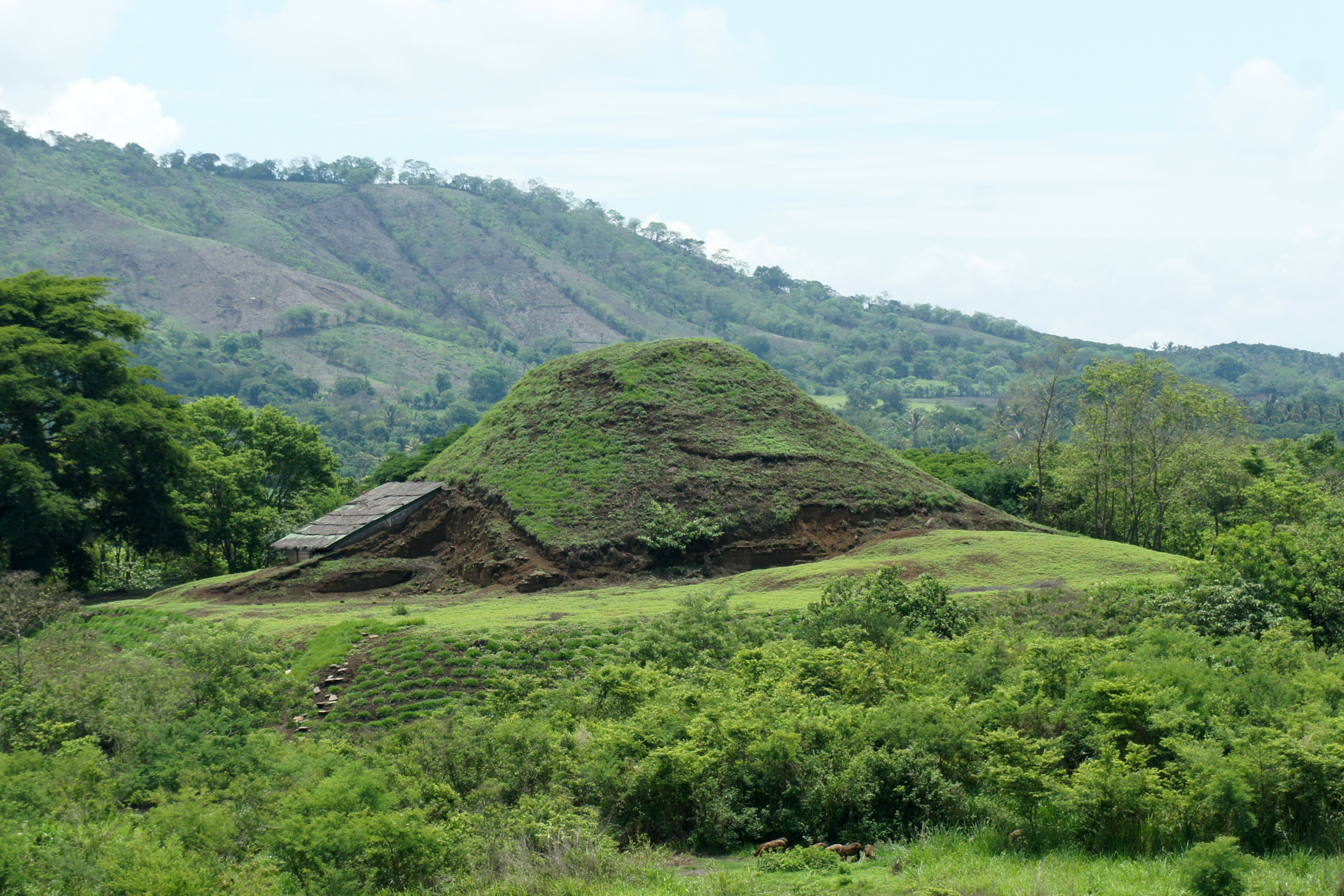
La Campana pyramid (structure 5), San Andrés

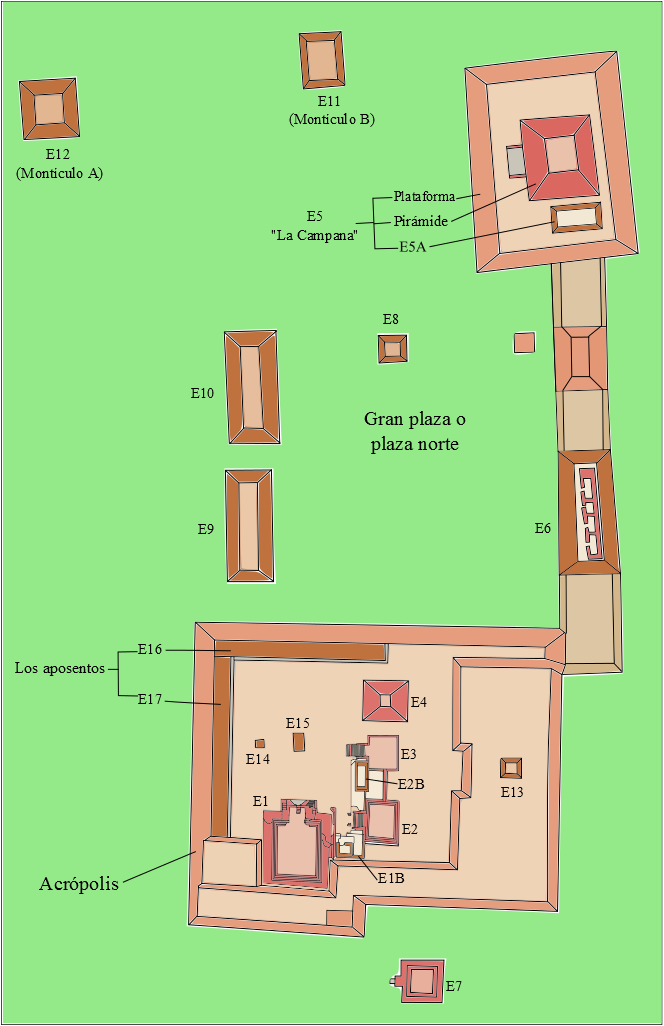
Structures of San Andrés

San Andrés (formerly known as Campana San Andrés) is a pre-Columbian site in El Salvador, whose occupation began around the year 900 BC as an agricultural town in the valley of Zapotitán in the department of La Libertad. This early establishment was vacated by the year 250 AD because of the enormous eruption of the caldera of Lago Ilopango, and was occupied again in the 5th Century, along with many other sites in the valley of Zapotitán. Between 600-900 AD, San Andrés was the capital of a Maya polity with supremacy over the other establishments of Valle de Zapotitán.

The residential area has not yet been well studied. The investigations and excavations in San Andrés have been primarily of the political-ceremonial center and have revealed that it was divided into the South Seat (from which they governed) and the North Seat. In the year 600 AD, the South Seat was filled with adobe (leaving a tunnel leading to the original seat) to construct the Acropolis, which contains ceremonial and political structures. In the ends to the South and East of the Acropolis are pyramids or structures: 1 (the main pyramid), 2, 3 and 4. In the North ends and the west are a series of rooms where the governors lived (the last palaces of San Andrés) of which two have been reconstructed. To the south of the Acropolis lies structure 7, another ceremonial structure. In the North seat, or Great Seat, is the pyramid or structure 5 (called "La Campana" - the bell) which is united with the Acropolis behind structure 6 (which has the shape of an L). Around structure 5 are the structures where commerce took place.

== Volcanic Activity ==
Positioned near multiple volcanoes, including the Santa Ana and San Salvador volcanic complexes, volcanic activity plays an important role in the site's history. One of the largest volcanic eruptions in the Americas was the Tierra Blanca Joven eruption, which is estimated to have occurred between AD 420 - 540. On the volcanic explosivity index (VEI), it measured a six. Over 20,000 square kilometers of land in the Zapotitán Valley was covered with tephra more than 35 centimeters thick. At San Andrés, the tephra was as thick as 52 centimeters in some areas.

The next major eruption was the Loma Caldera eruption, which happened around AD 610 - 671. It only measured a two on the VEI scale, however, it still covered San Andrés with up to 25 centimeters of tephra. Decades later, between AD 964 - 1040, El Boquerón eruption occurred, with a VEI of three.

== History ==
San Andrés Archaeological Site in El Salvador July 2007

Between 30 and 80 years after the Tierra Blanca Joven eruption, occupants began a large-scale construction of monumental structures at San Andrés. Occupants frequently used Tierra Blanca Joven tephra as construction material, notably to build the platform for the Campana structure. Researchers theorize this could have been done to memorialize the eruption into the site's architecture, as well as to emphasize the religious and spiritual connection to volcanoes. During the Late Classic period, La Campana was the biggest structure in the Zapotitán Valley, measuring 35 by 40 meters wide with a height of 13 meters. The structure was built on an even larger platform 85 by 65 meters wide and 7 meters tall. Combined with its platform, La Campana structure rose 20 meters high. Construction of the majority of the platform took place prior to the Loma Caldera Eruption. After the Loma Caldera Eruption, the platform was extended, and the pyramid was built on top of it. Occupants of San Andrés no longer used tephra as a primary construction material, and instead used adobe and mud plaster.

Between AD 600 - 900, San Andrés was the epicenter of the Zapotitán Valley. Archaeology demonstrates that San Andrés had strong contacts with Copán and the Guatemalan Highlands, and received goods from such distant places as the present territories of Petén and Belize. People from neighboring Cerén (Joya de Cerén) may have also traveled to San Andres to attend ceremonies and trade. Large labor projects were organized soon after both the Tierra Blanca Joven and Loma Caldera eruptions, suggesting that volcanic activity at San Andrés may have been a catalyst for social change and growth rather than collapse. There is evidence that San Andrés was in decline towards the end of the Late Classic period and likely abandoned prior to El Boquerón eruption around AD 964 - 1040. The rubble underneath El Boquerón tephra showed significant erosion, suggesting El Boquerón eruption was not the cause of the site's abandonment at this time. After the site was reoccupied in the Early Postclassic period, new occupants repaired the existing structures at San Andrés, treating them as sacred monuments. The last evidence of pre-Hispanic activity in the site was between the years 900 and 1200 AD as a residential site that consists of a final layer with fragments of censers and ceramics painted with scenes of sacrifice in Mixteca-Puebla style, which belong to a new cultural phase, named Guazapa, related to the pre-Hispanic city of Cihuatán.

After the Spanish Conquest, the ruins of San Andrés lay within a colonial estate dedicated to cattle and indigo production. The site was buried due to the eruption of the Playón volcano in 1658 AD, preserving the Colonial indigo production almost intact. In 1996, the Government of El Salvador inaugurated the Archaeological Park of San Andrés, where the visitor can climb the pyramids, see the indigo production area, and visit the site museum.

== See also ==
- History of El Salvador
- List of Mesoamerican pyramids
