= Cihuatán =

Archaeological site in El Salvador

Coordinates: 13.981°N 89.165°W

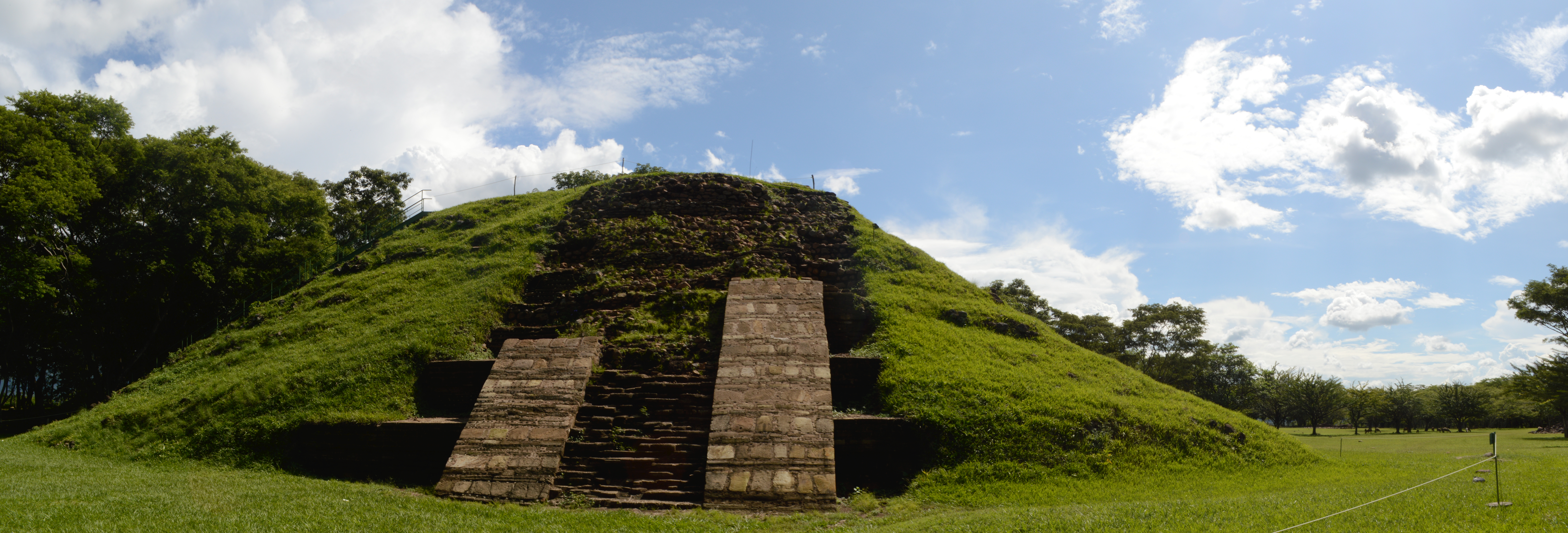
Main pyramid of Cihuatán

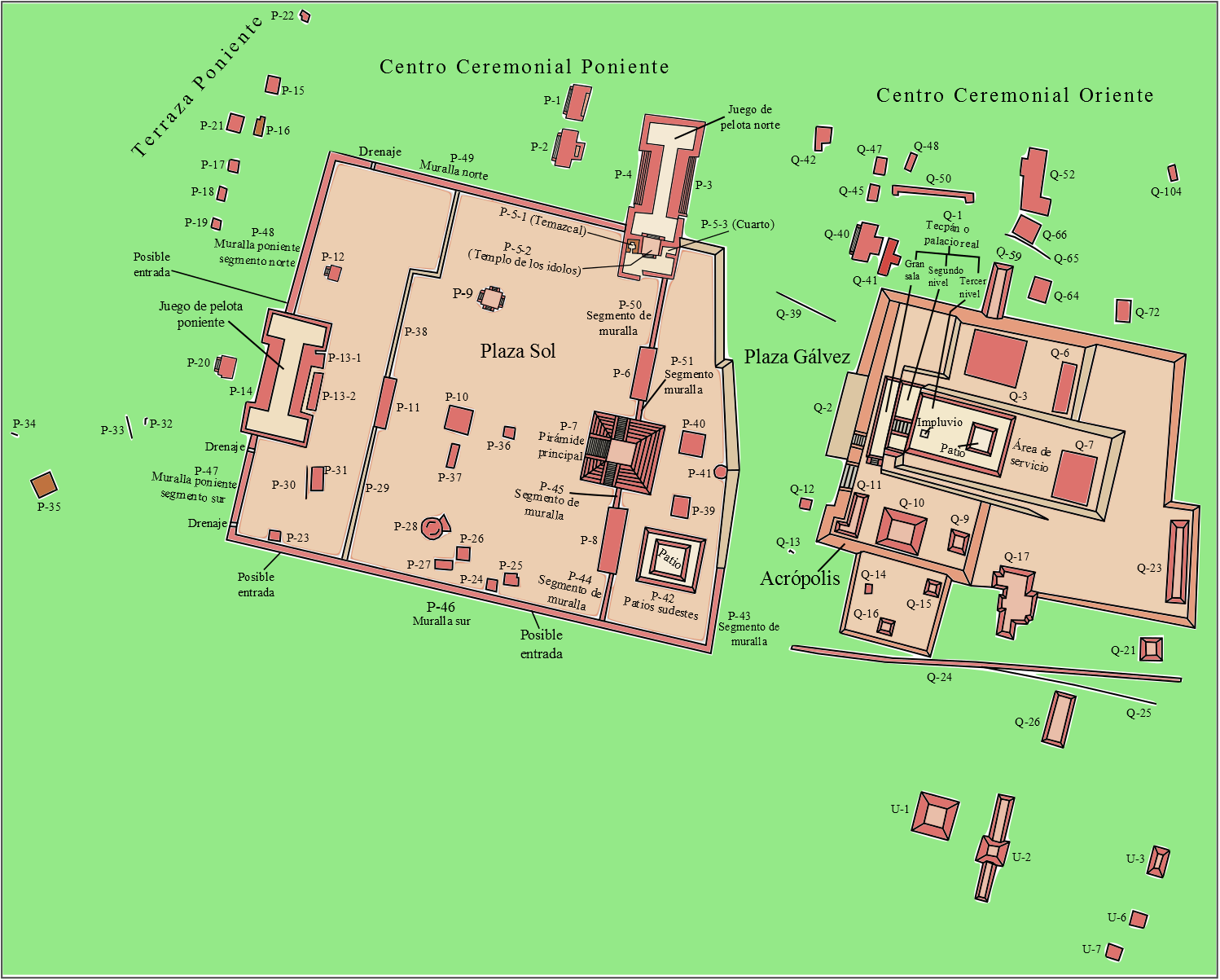
Structures of the monumental center of Cihuatán, showing all the structures of the western terrace and the western ceremonial center and the most notable ones of the eastern ceremonial center.

Cihuatán is a major pre-Columbian archaeological site in central El Salvador. It was a large urban center situated at the southernmost extent of the Mesoamerican cultural area. The site dates to the Early Postclassic period of Mesoamerican chronology, approximately AD 950–1200.

Archaeological investigations at Cihuatán were conducted during the mid to late 1970s by Karen Olsen Bruhns of San Francisco State University in collaboration with El Salvador's Administración de Patrimonio Cultural (Cultural Heritage Administration). By 1980, the project had mapped 63 hectares (6,800,000 sq ft) of the site, encompassing more than 900 structures.

== Location ==
Cihuatán is situated in the municipality of Aguilares, in the department of San Salvador, in central El Salvador.

== Site history ==
Cihuatán appears to have been established during the 8th or 9th century AD on a previously unoccupied site, with its period of occupation lasting more than a century. Its foundation coincided with the abandonment of major Classic period urban centers in the surrounding region, many of which maintained strong cultural and economic connections with Maya centers in present-day Honduras. The establishment of Cihuatán has been interpreted as potentially reflecting the regional disruptions associated with the Classic Maya collapse and the subsequent reorganization of trade networks. Although the ethnic affiliation of the site's ruling elite remains uncertain, the architectural traditions represented in structures outside the ceremonial core exhibit distinctive Maya characteristics.

Approximately 100 to 150 years after its foundation, Cihuatán was destroyed by a large conflagration that appears to have spread rapidly throughout the settlement. Archeological evidence indicates that inhabitants who survived the destruction subsequently abandoned the city, leaving behind their possessions. Spear points occur frequently within the burned deposits, while human remains recovered from drains within the acropolis were apparently trapped during the destruction and date to the period of the city's final occupation.

== Artifacts ==
Ceramics excavated at Cihuatán include large locally-produced ceramic effigies of central Mexican deities such as Tlaloc and Xipe Totec, and are very similar in style to effigies recovered from Central Mexico and the Gulf coast. Locally-produced utilitarian ceramics are of a type common to the southern Mesoamerican region during the Early Postclassic. Other ceramics include spiked incense burners, small anthropomorphic figurines, wheeled figurines, and clay boxes. Both locally-produced and imported ceramics appear to have close affinities with ceramic styles from Veracruz, on the Gulf coast of Mexico, and may have derived from them, although they are combined with strong local influences. Large quantities of obsidian artefacts were found at Cihuatán, in both residential and ceremonial contexts. These included obsidian cores, prismatic blades, and tools. Bifacial projectile points were also recovered, but were uncommon. These stone artefacts were typical of the Early Postclassic period.

== Site description ==
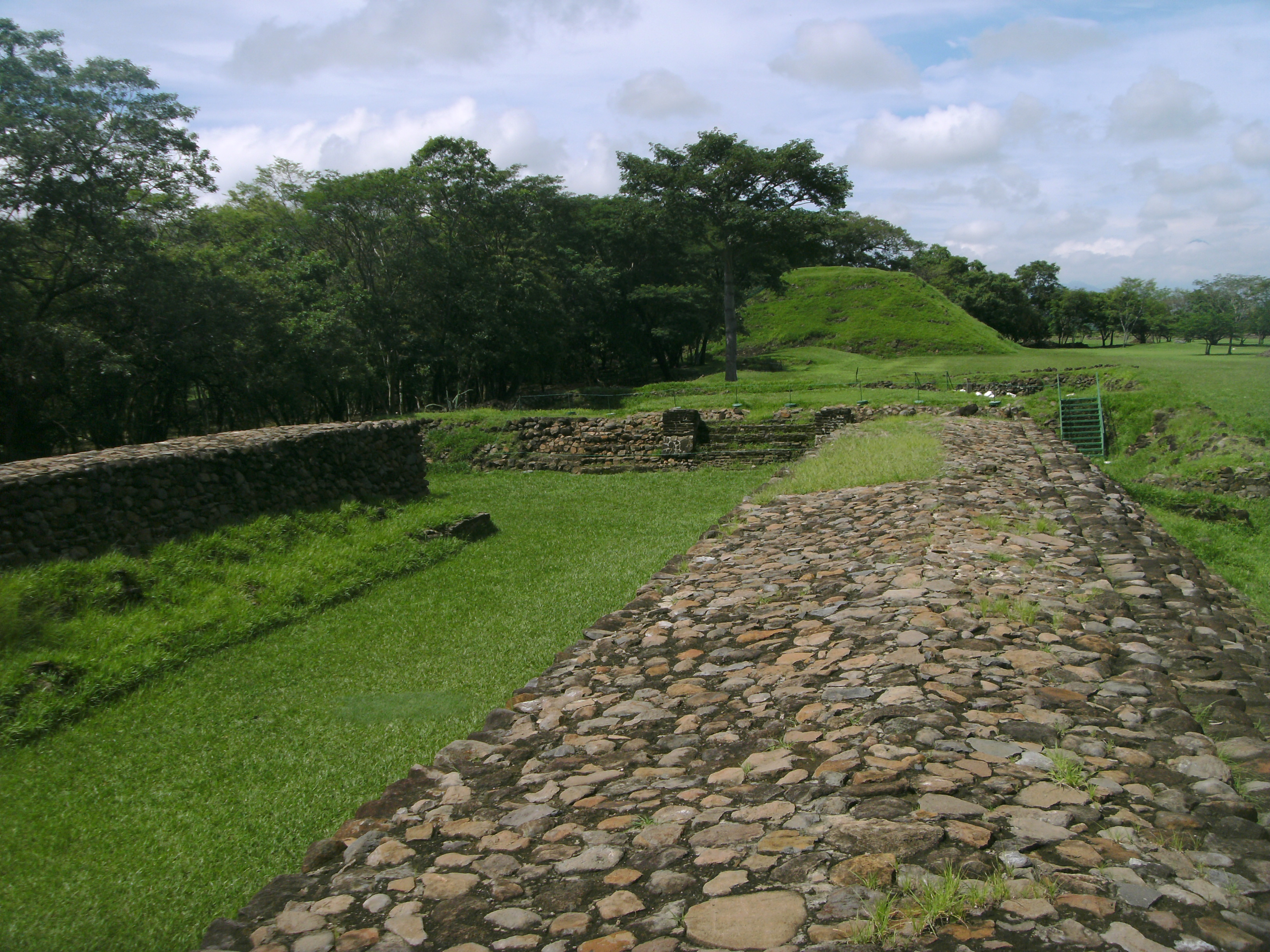
View of the Western Ceremonial Centre from one of the ballcourts

Cihuatán was a very large Mesoamerican city. The city possessed two principal ceremonial centres, known respectively as the Eastern and Western Ceremonial Centres. In 1978 the Western Ceremonial Centre was cleared of vegetation and mapped. Excavations included a cluster of residential buildings that had been hastily abandoned due to fire, resulting in many of the household goods being preserved when the walls collapsed. The ceremonial architecture of the site core is of a pan-Mesoamerican style; outside of the ceremonial groups, the style is distinctively Maya.

The Western Ceremonial Centre includes a large pyramid, a number of west-facing platforms that originally supported superstructures, and two -shaped Mesoamerican ballcourts. The excavator judged that the architectural styles of the Western Ceremonial Centre demonstrated the influence of Veracruz architectural styles. Radiocarbon dating suggests that the Western Ceremonial Centre was first built during the 8th or early-9th century AD.

The Eastern Ceremonial Centre is contemporary with the Western Ceremonial Centre, but is architecturally distinct in both plan and style.

NW 1/NW 3 was a residential cluster situated upon a 34-metre (112 ft) long terrace. It consisted of two houses and two smaller structures, and their courtyards. The smaller structures may have been used to store maize. This group of buildings was abandoned due to fire, and many household objects were recovered in situ, including large food storage jars, cooking pots, and decorated ceramics. Evidence for the manufacture of obsidian tools was excavated, and for the spinning of cotton.

P16 was a large structure situated on the West Terrace, in the centre of what was likely to have been the main marketplace in the city. Its construction style was similar to that of residential buildings, but it is likely to have served a specialist purpose. It had been burned, and contained ordinary domestic refuse. The south end of the building consisted of a very large workshop dedicated to the manufacture of obsidian woodworking tools.

P22 was a small ceremonial platform located to the northwest of the Western Ceremonial Centre. It is badly preserved but was rectangular in form, with its entrance stairway on the west side.
