= Antonio Barrios (soldier) =

Guatemalan army General

Antonio de Jesús Barrios Reyna (January 17, 1866 - July 25, 1915) was a Guatemalan Army general and executive government official who was the first international cadet to graduate from West Point (the United States Military Academy), as a member of the class of 1889.

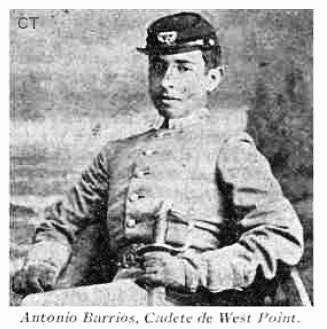
Antonio Barrios (1866–1915)

== Biography ==
Barrios was born on January 17, 1866; he was the natural son of Isabel Reyna, and General Justo Rufino Barrios, who later served as the President of Guatemala (1873-1885) following the triumph of the 1871 Liberal Revolution.

Barrios entered the academy in 1884 at West Point, New York and quickly became a skilled and recognized member of his class, finally graduating on June 12, 1889, following the death of his father and half-brother in 1885.

Following his graduation, Barrios served in the ranks of the Guatemalan Army and eventually was appointed the Minister of Public Works (Ministro de Fomento) under the government of his cousin, José María Reina Barrios. Just a few years later, Barrios died prematurely on July 25, 1915, in New York.

== See also ==
- History of Guatemala
