= Adán Mora =

Salvadoran general

Divisional General Adán Mora

10th Minister of War and Promotion of El Salvador
- In office 1 January 1884 – 14 May 1885
- President: Rafael Zaldívar
- Preceded by: Fabio Morán
- Succeeded by: Carlos Ezeta

Deputy of the Constituent Assembly of El Salvador from Sonsonate
- In office 1883

Personal details
- Born: San José Guayabal
- Died: 21 December 1895 San Salvador, El Salvador
- Party: Liberal
- Spouse: Josefa Delgado
- Education: University of El Salvador
- Occupation: Military officer, politician

Military service
- Allegiance: El Salvador
- Branch/service: Salvadoran Army
- Rank: Divisional general
- Battles/wars: War of 1863; First Honduran intervention; Barrios' War of Reunification; Battle of Chalchuapa; Menéndez's revolution (surrendered)

Adán Mora (died 21 December 1895) was a Salvadoran military officer and politician. He served as the Minister of War and Promotion under President Rafael Zaldívar and led Salvadoran forces during the 1885 Battle of Chalchuapa.

== Biography ==
Adán Mora was born in San José Guayabal. He graduated as a Bachelor of Sciences and Arts from the University of El Salvador. He participated in the War of 1863 where he was promoted to lieutenant. He married Josefa Delgado. Mora was promoted to colonel during the First Honduran intervention in 1872. Mora was promoted to brigadier general in 1876 and to divisional general in 1879. He was elected to the Constituent Assembly from the Sonsonate Department in 1883. In 1884, Zaldívar appointed Mora as Minister of War and Promotion.

Mora commanded Salvadoran forces during the April 1885 Battle of Chalchuapa that resulted in the death of Guatemalan president Justo Rufino Barrios. The following month, Mora fought for Fernando Figueroa's government against a revolution led by Divisional General Francisco Menéndez. Mora surrendered in June and was exiled from El Salvador. He returned during the presidency of General Carlos Ezeta and he became the military commander of Puerto El Triunfo. Mora died from illness in San Salvador on 21 December 1895.

Political offices
Preceded by Fabio Morán	Minister of War and Promotion of El Salvador; 1884–1885	Succeeded by Carlos Ezeta
