= Venancio Barrios =

Guatemalan Army General (1852–1885)

Venancio Barrios de León (May 14, 1852 – April 2, 1885) was a Guatemalan Army General who notably participated in the 1885 Central American Campaign led by his father, President Justo Rufino Barrios. They were both killed in action during the Battle of Chalchuapa.

== Biography ==
Venancio Barrios was born on May 14, 1852, in Guatemala City; his parents were Justo Rufino (who was not yet President) and Agripita Barrios. His younger half-brother, Antonio Barrios Reyna would also become a general and his paternal cousin, José María Reina Barrios, would later serve as President from 1892 to 1898.

Barrios first served as head of the Honor Guard in 1880, later serving in his father's General Staff during the 1885 campaign. Barrios was killed in action on April 2, 1885, in Chalchuapa, El Salvador. Barrios is buried in the General Cemetery with his father.
