= Liberal Revolution =

Liberal Revolution may refer to:

- Liberal Revolution of 1820, in Portugal
- Liberal rebellions of 1842, in Brazil
- Liberal Revolution of 1854, in Peru
- Liberal Revolution of 1871, in Guatemala
- Liberal Revolution of 1895, in Ecuador
- Colour revolution
