= Barrios' War of Reunification =

1885 war in Central America

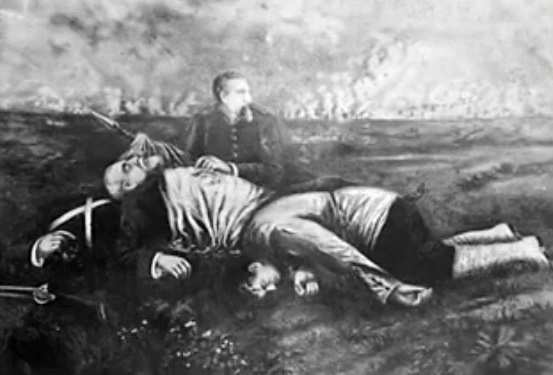
- The death of Justo Rufino Barrios as depicted by the Revista Guatemala magazine, 1887
Date	28 February – 14 April 1885; (1 month, 2 weeks and 3 days); Active combat: 31 March – 2 April 1885; (3 days)
Location	Guatemala and El Salvador
Result	Anti-Barrios victory: Failure to reunify Central America; Death of Justo Rufino Barrios

Belligerents
El Salvador; Mexico; Costa Rica; Nicaragua	Guatemala; Honduras

Commanders and leaders
Rafael Zaldívar; Adán Mora; Porfirio Díaz; Próspero Fernández #; Bernardo Soto Alfaro; Adán Cárdenas	Justo Rufino Barrios †; Felipe Cruz; Manuel Barillas; José Reina; Luis Bográn

Strength
20,000	14,500

Casualties and losses
50–200 dead 150 injured	1,500+ dead

Barrios' War of Reunification, also known as Barrios' great attempt (Spanish: intentona de Barrios), was a war initiated by Guatemalan President Justo Rufino Barrios in 1885 with the goal of reunifying Central America. Of the five Central American countries, only Honduras supported Barrios' reunification effort; Costa Rica, El Salvador, and Nicaragua opposed it, as did Mexico.

Barrios commanded 14,500 soldiers in an invasion of El Salvador on 31 March 1885, however, he was killed during the Battle of Chalchuapa on 2 April, and Guatemalan forces subsequently withdrew from El Salvador shortly afterwards. Honduras and Guatemala signed peace treaties on 11 and 14 April, respectively, ending the short-lived war.

== Background ==
=== Previous efforts to reunify Central America ===
Central America declared its independence from the Spanish Empire on 15 September 1821, and after briefly being annexed by the First Mexican Empire from 1822 to 1823, the Federal Republic of Central America was established on 1 July 1823. The federal republic eventually dissolved in 1839 following two civil wars and the overthrow of President Francisco Morazán, resulting in the independence of Costa Rica, El Salvador, Guatemala, Honduras, and Nicaragua.

Since the collapse of the federal republic, several attempts were made by the various Central American republics to reunify the region through diplomacy or through war. Due to liberal domination of Central American politics during the federal republic's existence, conservatives tended to oppose Central American reunification and prefer the independence of all five republics, while liberals were typically proponents of reunifying the region. A convention between El Salvador and Honduras in 1842 elected Antonio José Cañas as president of a new federation, but the remaining republic refused to recognize his authority. A treaty between El Salvador and Guatemala in 1845 produced no results due to political instability in El Salvador.

=== Reunification plans of Justo Rufino Barrios ===
During the Liberal Revolution of April 1871, two Guatemalan Divisional Generals, Miguel García Granados and Justo Rufino Barrios, overthrew President Vicente Cerna y Cerna. García Granados replaced Cerna y Cerna as President, but he retired in 1873 and was succeeded by Barrios. Barrios was a firm supporter of Central American reunification and he wanted to make himself President of a reunited Central America. Guatemalan liberal leaders were inspired by Otto von Bismarck successfully uniting the Germans under Prussia in 1870, viewing Prussia's relationship to the smaller German states as equivalent to Guatemala's relationship with the other Central American countries.

In 1876, Barrios suggested that representatives from all five republics should meet to discuss the possibility of reunification. The delegates met in Guatemala City, however, a war between El Salvador and Guatemala that April brought an end to the reunification discussions. During the war, Barrios invaded El Salvador and forced President Andrés del Valle and Vice President Santiago González to resign. In the subsequent June 1876 presidential election, Rafael Zaldívar was elected as president of El Salvador.

== War ==
=== Declaration of unification ===
On 28 February 1885, Barrios unilaterally declared the establishment of the Central America Union and appointed himself as having supreme authority over all five Central American countries. The National Assembly of Guatemala held a session on 5 March and the legislature approved Barrios' declaration. Barrios believed all the other Central American nations would be enthusiastic to join Guatemala to recreate a Central American union, but instead, only Honduras accepted his declaration on 7 March. The other three nations, Costa Rica, El Salvador, and Nicaragua, all denounced the declaration and wished to remain independent.

=== Mexican involvement ===
Barrios began mobilizing the Guatemalan Army on 10 March and began moving his soldiers to the Salvadoran border on 23 March. He threatened military force and thought that the threat of military action would make El Salvador submit, however, Salvadoran President Rafael Zaldívar began preparing his own army to defend against Barrios' invasion force.

El Salvador called for assistance from Mexico to distract the Guatemalans while they prepared their army. President Porfirio Díaz mobilized an army of 15,000 soldiers along the Guatemalan border, and in response, Barrios had 1,500 soldiers stationed on the border under the command of Manuel Barillas to defend from a Mexican invasion. The Guatemalans attempted to negotiate with the Mexicans through the United States' ambassador to Guatemala, Antonio Batres Jáuregui. The negotiations succeeded and Díaz demobilized his soldiers, stating that the measures were for self-defense purposes.

=== Invasion of El Salvador ===
On 31 March, Barrios marched his soldiers into Salvadoran territory and the first target to capture was the town of Chalchuapa. The Salvadorans defended the town with a garrison of 5,000 soldiers under the command of Divisional General Adán Mora. The Guatemalans waged a battle from 1 to 2 April but the defensive forces stood their ground. Barrios was killed during the battle with reports claiming he was either shot in the heart by a Salvadoran soldier and fell off his horse or that he was shot in the back by a Guatemalan soldier who accidentally shot him.

After Barrios was killed, one of his military officers, Felipe Cruz, took command of the army. He attempted to keep waging battle, but due to falling morale, he had his forces retreat.

=== Peace ===
Zaldívar attempted to seek peace but Cruz initially refused. Honduras and Nicaragua agreed to peace on 11 April while Guatemala, El Salvador, and Costa Rica came to peace on 14 April.

== Aftermath ==
After Barrios' death, Alejandro M. Sinibaldi became acting president of Guatemala, who was then succeeded by Barillas shortly afterwards. Zaldívar was overthrown in May by Francisco Menéndez. Costa Rican President Próspero Fernández Oreamuno died in office during the war and was succeeded by Bernardo Soto Alfaro.

Support for reunification in Guatemala subsided following Barrios' death.

=== Later efforts for reunification ===
On 15 November 1886, Barillas sent a message to the leaders of Costa Rica, Honduras, and Nicaragua to send delegates to Guatemala City in order to discuss maintaining peace in Central America. On 16 February 1887, the delegates drafted a treaty of peace and amity and continued negotiations in 1888 and 1889 to form a federation through diplomatic means. These negotiations concluded with the republics agreeing to inaugurate a federal government on 15 September 1890, however, the overthrow of Salvadoran President Francisco Menéndez by General Carlos Ezeta in June 1890 and the subsequent war between El Salvador and Guatemala prevented such a federal government from forming.

The Greater Republic of Central America was formed by El Salvador, Honduras, and Nicaragua in 1895, but the republic collapsed in November 1898 after Salvadoran President Rafael Antonio Gutiérrez was overthrown by General Tomás Regalado. In September 1921, El Salvador, Guatemala, and Honduras drafted a constitution for a new Central American republic but it dissolved by 1922.
