= 1871 Guatemalan Revolution =

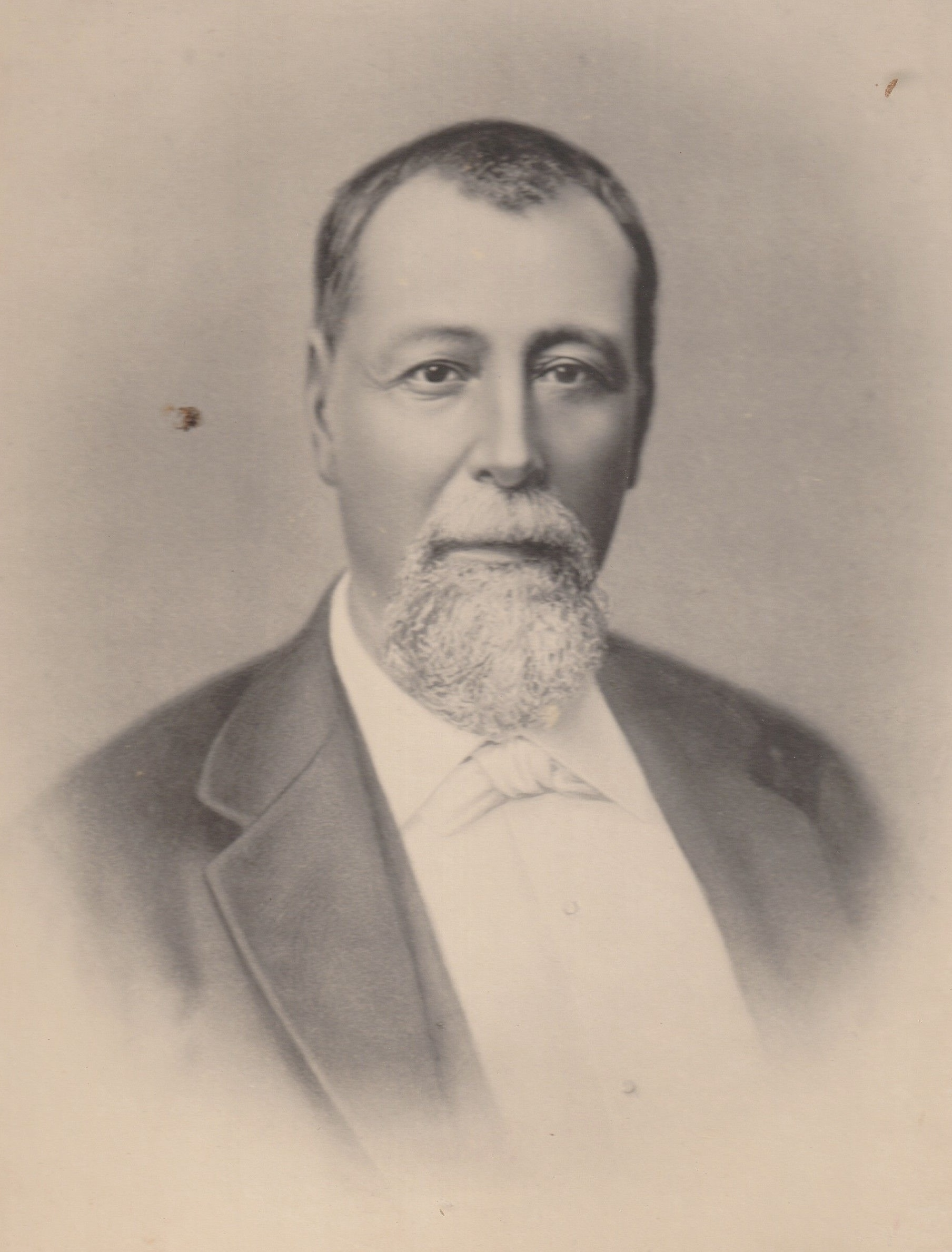
Justo Rufino Barrios

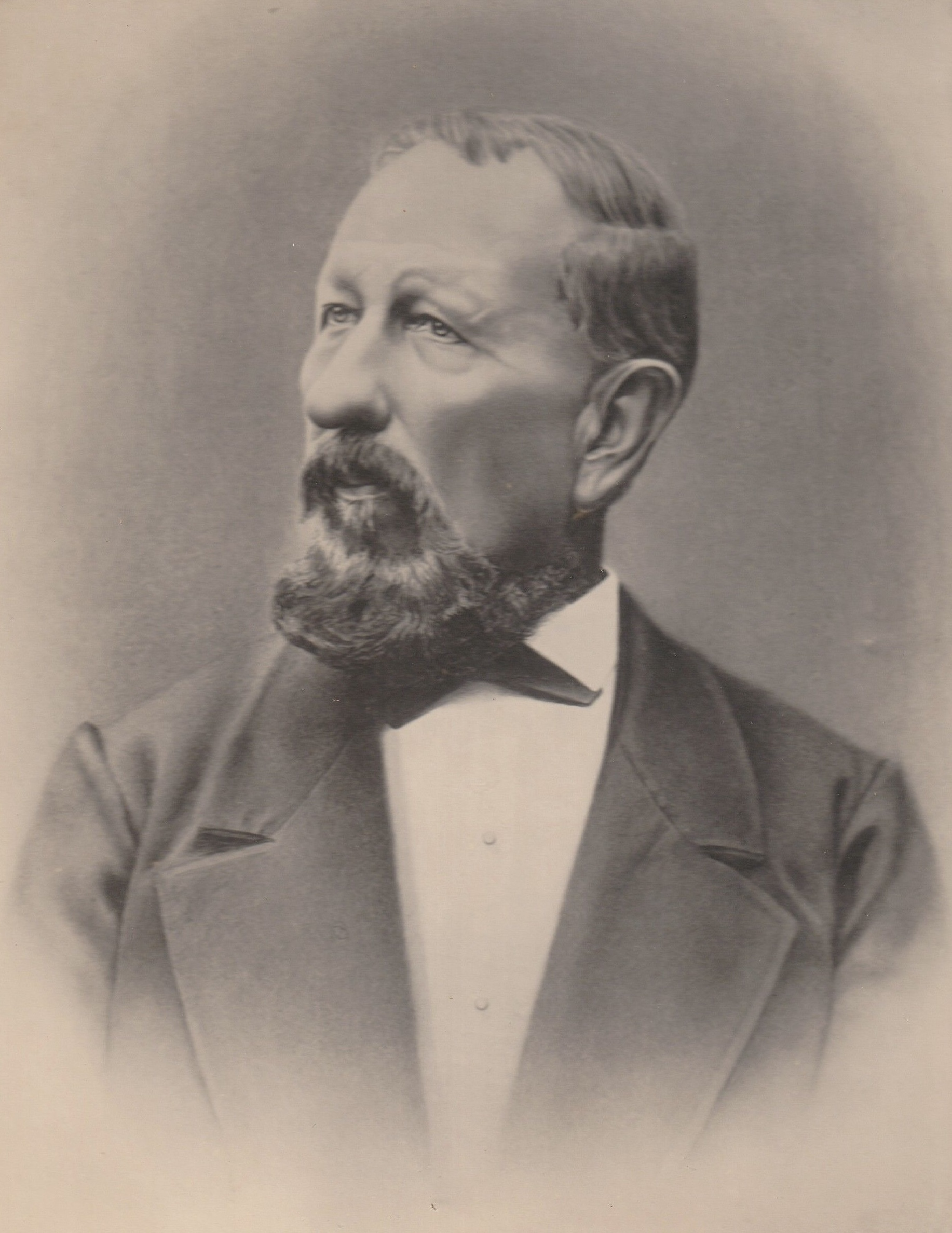
Vicente Cerna

Barrios (left) and Cerna (right), the leader of the revolution and president of Guatemala respectively.

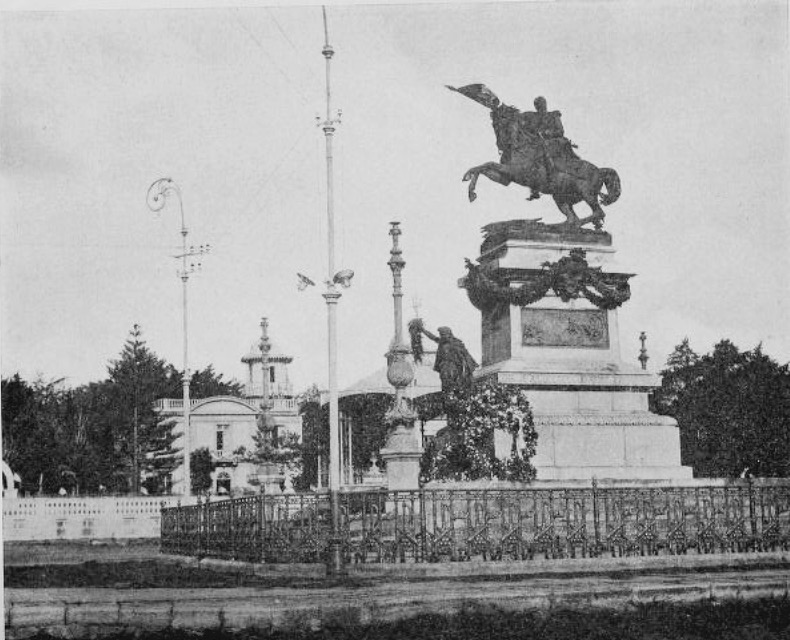
Monument to Barrios on Avenida Reforma, Guatemala City

The Guatemalan Revolution of 1871 was a revolt led by Liberals under Justo Rufino Barrios and Miguel García Granados against the Conservative leadership of President Vicente Cerna y Cerna, the hand-picked successor of Rafael Carrera.

== Overview ==
In June 1871, Liberal revolutionaries commanded by Barrios and Granados successfully overthrew the government of President Cerna upon triumphantly entering the capital. Just a few days before, the Liberals had issued the Acta de Patzicía (Plan of Patzicía) which declared an open rebellion against the Conservative regime.

Following the overthrow of Cerna, Granados was appointed President on June 30, holding the position until June 1873, when it was then handed over to Barrios. The newly established government soon began implementing major reforms, including the confiscation of church and communal lands. Barrios continuously faced opposition from Conservative elites, such as the Arrivillaga and Aycinena clans, whose large estates had been confiscated under his leadership.

== Background ==
=== Central American Federation ===
Main articles: United Provinces of Central America and Federal Republic of Central America

During the Central American mandate of Francisco Morazán, who had moved the Central American capital to El Salvador, internal struggles within the confederation forced him to undertake military actions to maintain its unity. He had to go into exile in 1840, forced by the conservative forces of Rafael Carrera; he returned two years later, intending to restore the confederation, but was betrayed and ultimately executed by firing squad in Costa Rica.

=== Conservative governments of Guatemala ===
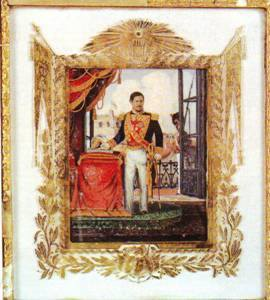
Captain General Rafael Carrera y Turcios, lifetime conservative president of Guatemala.

After the victory of Rafael Carrera in the struggle he had initiated since 1837 against Francisco Morazán, the fractures among the local governments of Central America made it impossible to continue with the Federal Republic of Central America: a powerful conservative government in Guatemala eliminated any possibility of such a union. Carrera settled in power and governed Guatemala on two occasions and was later elected president for life until his death. Rafael Carrera had during his government the favorable support of conservative and liberal political and religious groups (although not publicly). During his mandate, he vindicated and returned to the regular orders (Note: Franciscans, Dominicans, Mercedarians and Jesuits, among others.) the goods that had been confiscated from the Catholic Church during the liberal governments, restored tithes, abolished the indigenous tribute, silenced the press—something that, it should be said, continued to be practiced by the liberals in a harsher and stricter manner—and founded the Republic of Guatemala on March 21, 1847. What is not generally discussed or written about are the contributions in economic matters, since it was during his government that coffee began to be cultivated in the country due to the fact that cochineal dye (Note: At that time the main crop of Guatemala) was losing ground in international markets because of the emergence of artificial red dyes. He maintained a war against El Salvador and Honduras between 1850 and 1853, and in El Salvador, supporting the conservatives, overthrowing Gerardo Barrios and installing Francisco Dueñas. After the death of Carrera and some provisional governments, Vicente Cerna y Cerna was elected president of the Republic in 1865. During his government, Cerna continued the conservative policy initiated by his predecessor. After being re-elected in 1869, he implemented a repressive policy and ended parliamentary debate. Miguel García Granados, who had been leader of the Liberal Party, and who had maintained opposition to the policies of Carrera and Cerna, led two failed uprisings against Cerna in 1865 and 1867, after which he had to go into exile in Mexico. In this country, together with Justo Rufino Barrios, he organized an army along with exiled Guatemalans (mostly mercenaries) to depose Cerna.

== History of the Liberal Reform ==
=== Chronology ===
Background and military actions of the Liberal Revolution of 1871
Campaign	Date	Description
Background	1868	The conservative government took strong repressive measures in the mountainous region, relocating entire towns to new locations and evacuating the population from conflict regions to weaken the rebels. Francisco Cruz rose in arms from the estate of Justo Rufino Barrios in Malacatán, but was defeated and executed; Barrios fled to Chiapas and became the leader of the Guatemalan liberals, with the help of Mexican president Benito Juárez. Barrios's father was captured and tortured in Guatemala City. Cerna's government was completely identified with the conservative elite of the Aycinena clan and had lost the support of the large indigenous masses that had been unconditional to Carrera.
Background	8 January 1869	Marshal Vicente Cerna y Cerna, attempting to legitimize his presidency, announced that his presidential term would end on May 23 of that year and called for a meeting of the assembly on January 17 to elect a new president, whose term would end in 1872. The liberals chose José Víctor Zavala, a conservative and friend of Carrera, as their candidate, since they considered him the only one who could guide the transition between radical conservatives and positivist liberals.
Background	17 January 1869	Marshal Cerna was elected in the assembly, while General Zavala began to align with liberal representatives, although without ceasing to be loyal to the conservative government.
Background	25 November 1869	After suspending constitutional guarantees, Cerna informed the Assembly that he would suspend its sessions because the conditions of the country did not guarantee that this body could meet normally. The Assembly closed its sessions on December 1, 1869 and granted power to the president to suppress the insurgents.
Campaign of General Serapio Cruz	7 December 1869	The liberal troops of Serapio Cruz attacked the plaza of Huehuetenango where they were repelled by the forces of the conservative government.
Campaign of General Serapio Cruz	23 January 1870	General Serapio Cruz, who had risen in arms against Cerna's conservative government, was defeated in Palencia where his forces were dispersed and he was captured and executed. His body was decapitated and the head fried in oil and then paraded triumphantly through the streets of Guatemala City. Cerna eliminated the freedom of thought that had existed in Guatemala since Carrera's death and ordered the capture of liberal leaders, deputy Miguel García Granados, Manuel Larrave and José María Samayoa. Only García Granados managed to escape, aided by fellow deputy José Víctor Zavala, and then took refuge in the British embassy, from where he was able to leave the country after paying a bail of $10,000.
Campaign of 1871	3 April 1871	Captain Antonio Búrbano, commanding two hundred sixty men of government forces, attacked Tacaná, but after a brief combat withdrew leaving the field to the small liberal force. Conservative president Dueñas fell in El Salvador, allowing the eastern front against the government to begin.
Campaign of 1871	14 May 1871	When the forces of Miguel García Granados approached Retalhuleu, it was abandoned by its garrison of two hundred fifty men. The liberals were later attacked by four hundred men from Santa Rosa, commanded by Major Simón Ruano together with the two hundred fifty who had fled. But the liberals managed to repel the forces of the conservative government.
Campaign of 1871	28 May 1871	Colonel Aquilino Calonge with nine hundred men from the conservative government moved against the insurgent liberals, who numbered only three hundred men. The combat began at 9:00 am, and despite the numerical superiority of the government forces, they were completely defeated, leaving on the field two hundred weapons, eight boxes of ammunition and other supplies.
Campaign of 1871	3 June 1871	Act of Patzicía: Barrios and other liberal leaders met in Patzicía, and rejected the authority of Cerna's government, appointing General Miguel García Granados as provisional president, authorized to establish his government.
Campaign of 1871	23 June 1871	Eight hundred men of the liberal army had taken positions on the summit of Cerro el Coshón, and on June 22 advanced to Tierra Blanca. On the 23rd at 4:00 am the conservative troops of Vicente Cerna y Cerna, which extended from the heights of Calvario of Totonicapán to Agua Caliente, began the combat, which ended at 1:00 p.m. with a defeat for Cerna's forces, which despite numbering six thousand men, had to yield the plaza to the liberals. Cerna withdrew from Totonicapán and García Granados's troops occupied the plaza the following day.
Campaign of 1871	29 June 1871	After the defeat at Tierra Blanca, President Cerna went to Chimaltenango, where he intended to fortify himself, but at the last moment decided to continue toward Antigua Guatemala; the liberals who followed him took the road to Sumpango, cutting off his communication with Guatemala City. At 8:30 am on the 29th, the liberals occupied San Lucas Sacatepéquez. General García Granados ordered General Barrios to take positions dominating the crossroads of San Lucas, where the road forks between Antigua Guatemala and Guatemala City. Barrios sent three companies to occupy Cerro San Bartolo, which engaged the conservative vanguard and occupied the position. Cerna had the heights overlooking the road to Labor de Diéguez and other nearby positions occupied, but was defeated after an hour of combat.
Campaign of 1871	30 June 1871	Entry of the liberal army into the capital of Guatemala: Marshal José Víctor Zavala intervened to prevent the liberal troops from carrying out a massacre in the city, and to guarantee an efficient transition to the new government.
Conservative revolt	23 September 1871	General Barrios triumphed over the forces of the conservative faction that rose against the liberals.
Conservative revolt	24 September 1871	After occupying Cerro Gordo, Barrios again defeated the conservative revolutionaries in Santa Rosa.

On June 30, 1871, the liberal army entered Guatemala City and García Granados was appointed provisional president, governing until June 4, 1873. His ministers of state were: José Víctor Zavala—in the Ministry of War—, Felipe Gálvez—in the Ministry of Foreign Affairs and in that of Public Instruction—, J.M. Samayoa—in the Ministry of Development—, and Francisco Alburez—in that of Government, Justice and Ecclesiastical Affairs.

From the first days of his government, decrees were initiated that radically modified the economic and diplomatic policy of the Guatemalan regime. For example, the Ministry of Development was created by García Granados on August 25, 1871, according to Decree No. 14 of the liberal government, replacing the Consulate of Commerce that had functioned during the conservative governments; this new ministry was tasked with promoting and improving commerce, agriculture, livestock, arts, industries, public works, telegraph lines and other means of communication.

=== National symbols ===
There were also other decrees, aimed at eliminating any conservative vestige from national emblems; Decree No. 12 of the liberal government established the new national flag of Guatemala on August 17, 1871, reverting to the colors approved on August 21, 1823 and eliminating the red and yellow stripes that had been instituted by the government of Rafael Carrera as references to Spain. (Note: The liberal coat of arms does not refer to the creation of the conservative Republic of Guatemala, founded by the conservative Carrera on March 21, 1847.)

Subsequently, the creation of the current Coat of arms of Guatemala was authorized, where the quetzal appears as a symbol of freedom, replacing the conservative coat of arms, which referred to the creation of the Republic of Guatemala on March 21, 1847, in clear opposition to the union with the rest of the nations of the area, which were liberal.

These were the changes in the national symbols:

Flag of Guatemala
(1858–1871)

Flag of Guatemala
(1871–1968) (Note: It remained in force until September 15, 1968, when the blue color was changed to sky blue and the dimensions of the coat of arms were reduced.)

Coat of arms of Guatemala
(1858–1871)

Coat of arms of Guatemala after the Liberal Reform

=== Attack on the political and economic power of the Catholic Church ===
The liberal writers explained their position regarding the regular orders of the Catholic Church in terms similar to those used here by Ramón Rosa:

"En América, en donde la instrucción popular se difunde con la celeridad de la luz, y en donde no existen, como en Europa, muy arraigados y tradicionales intereses religiosos, que dan poder y privilegios a numerosas clases sociales; en nuestra América, en donde la libertad de conciencia es ya una conquista definitiva: todas, todas las religiones positivas tienen que desaparecer, en no remoto día, con sus artificiosos y contradictorios dogmas, con sus litúrgicos aparatos teatrales, con sus sangrientas historias, con sus egoístas y mal disfrazados intereses mundanos, con sus hipócritas santidades, con sus privilegiadas y ensoberbecidas castas, y con sus execrables tiranías [...]".

— Ramón Rosa
In the prologue of Poemas de José Joaquín Palma
Honduras, 1882.

Before 1871, the Guatemalan economy had been based on crops or activities that did not require much labor, such as the nopal used for cochineal. But as cochineal was displaced from international markets by artificial chemical dyes, the new crop that developed—coffee—required many laborers for its production. The problem was resolved by reinstating systems of labor contracting and management typical of the colonial era; this system of forced labor went beyond the agricultural field and was also used in public works, especially in the construction of roads, telegraphs and other means of communication.

On the other hand, the regular clergy, which had been a powerful landowner and political factor during the conservative government, was again stripped of its assets, including not only its convents, but also its estates, sugar mills and doctrinas. (Note: Doctrinas were indigenous towns assigned to a particular religious order for catechization; however, under this pretext the orders used the labor of the catechized for free.)

The Jesuits were expelled on September 3, 1871 after being given twenty-four hours to leave the country; seventy-two of them embarked at Puerto San José for Corinto, in Nicaragua.

At the beginning of October 1871 a conservative revolt occurred in the eastern part of the country, which forced García Granados to leave the city to suppress it; then, taking advantage of his absence, the ministers of state issued Decrees No. 21 and 22 of October 14, 1871, appointing him Captain General of the Army and then Marshal Justo Rufino Barrios as Lieutenant General of the Army, for their "services in favor of the people". On October 17 García Granados returned and ratified those decrees and also issued Decree No. 23 by which he expelled the Archbishop of Guatemala—Bernardo Piñol y Aycinena—and No. 24 by which he expelled the Bishop of Teya—Mariano Ortiz Urruela—for having led the conservative revolution in the east. Finally, to completely weaken the secular clergy, the mandatory tithe was prohibited on December 22, 1871.

Being lieutenant general of the army and in charge of the presidency of the provisional government of the Republic in the absence of García Granados, on May 24, 1872 he confiscated some properties of the religious and suppressed the Jesuits and other regular orders. Barrios was convinced that the Catholic Church had been responsible for the fall of the liberal government of Francisco Morazán and that it had given its full support to the government of Rafael Carrera; for that reason he decided that this could never happen again in Guatemala and set about undermining the economic power of the Church.

When the Catholic populace rose in protest against these provisions, Barrios promulgated the following decree:

J. RUFINO BARRIOS
Lieutenant General of the Army and Acting President of the Provisional Government of the Republic

To his fellow citizens:

Firmly resolved to carry out the salutary aims embodied in the democratic revolution that [...] of so many sacrifices has [...] in our homeland, I do not avoid, nor will I avoid, any means to [...] and [...] into practical results. I act thus because [...] and in institutions, do not go beyond being vain [...] which today or tomorrow fall into shameful discredit under the push of disastrous reactions.

A proof of these ideas: a clear testimony of my purposes is the decree that as of today I have issued, declaring the [...] of the religious communities and the nationalization of their goods whose proceeds [...] the government to free education, the only means of effectively achieving the progress and freedom of peoples.7

[...] The measure I have taken is proper and worthy of civilized peoples; even well-inspired monarchies have decreed the [...] of religious orders and the nationalization of their temporalities. Why, compatriots, should we not take that great step, we who are republicans and who cannot consent to the civil death of the individual, we who aspire with the [...] institutions thus to forge the happiness of our homeland?

[...] May the blindfold of fanaticism and ancient prejudices [...] your eyes: may the dissatisfied with the government [...] the decree of enclosure as a partisan weapon to create [...] and disturb public order, that the national clergy and the [...] religious, treated with benevolence and respect, do not strive to mislead the opinion of the unwary to provoke disturbances; because if such a thing happens, for the religious who show themselves instigators, there will be expulsion instead of enclosure, and for all those who cause scandal and oppose the law, understand compatriots, that I have sufficient force and energy to reprimand them and apply severe penalties as befits the ruler who knows how to fear and respect the laws and the principles that determine the aims of his administration.

Guatemala, June 7, 1872

Justo Rufino Barrios

By virtue of this decree, the army occupied the buildings of the orders, and gave the religious an ultimatum that if they wished to remain in the country, they should be secularized—that is, become priests and abandon the regular order to which they belonged.

Finally, in March 1873, it was decreed that the secular clergy would be subject to the civil courts, freedom of worship was decreed, and the religious orders were placed under government control.

=== Rivalries between García Granados and Justo Rufino Barrios ===
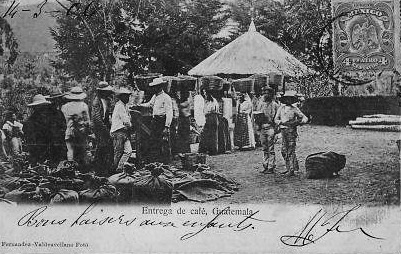
Delivery of coffee on a German-owned estate. With the liberal revolution began large-scale coffee cultivation, which led to the implementation of a Reglamento de Jornaleros that placed the indigenous population in a position of servitude on coffee plantations.

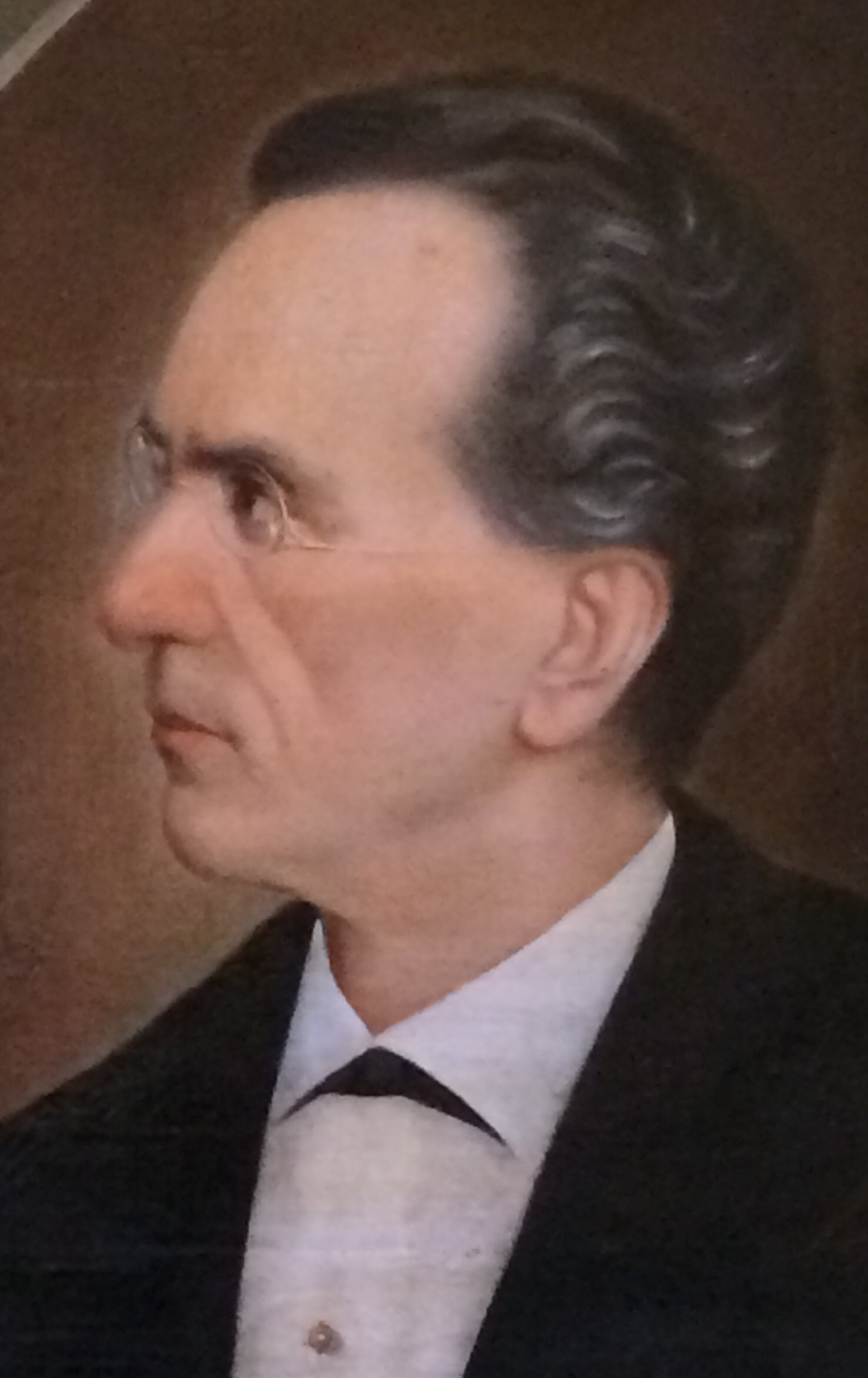
General Miguel García Granados, leader of the Liberal Revolution of 1871.

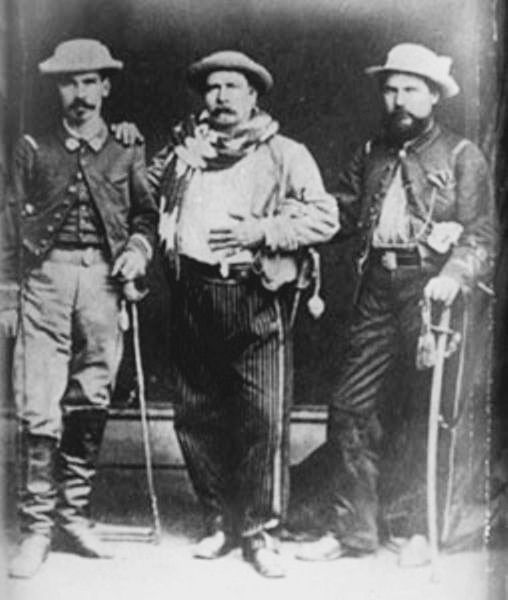
General José Onofre Barillas with his sons Manuel Lisandro and Isodoro shortly after the triumph of the Liberal Revolution of 1871.

The liberal reform followed the guidelines of the government program of Morazán and Gálvez in the 1830s, with the difference that Miguel García Granados was a moderate politician, who believed in the slow transformation of the people and the government and who did not wish to have conflicts with members of the Aycinena clan to which his family belonged. For his part, Justo Rufino Barrios wanted to wrest power from that family; when he was appointed governor of Quetzaltenango he realized that to establish liberalism in that province he had to break the influence exercised there by the Jesuits, so he chose to get rid of them by sending them to Guatemala City. To neutralize the political power of the Catholic Church, which had been reinforced by the Guatemalan Concordat of 1852 signed by Carrera and members of the Aycinena clan with the Holy See, Barrios began his attack against the regular order he considered most pernicious: the Jesuits.

Barrios had the support of radical liberals, while García Granados had that of moderate liberals and—to a lesser extent—the conservatives of the Aycinena clan. Attacks soon began through publications from both sides, and tensions reached such a degree that the issue of the expulsion of the Jesuits reached García Granados himself. The president, wishing to avoid a direct confrontation, went to the eastern provinces of the country to suppress a conservative insurrection and appointed Barrios as provisional president. When García Granados returned, he could barely recognize his moderate program of government. The radicals then proposed to install Barrios permanently in the presidency, and thus arose a clear desire to replace the indecisive elderly president with the young caudillo who possessed a stronger and more resolute character.

=== Protestantism ===
Once Justo Rufino Barrios was already president, he opened the doors of Guatemala to the migration of evangelical missionaries into the country, the first being the Presbyterian John C. Hill. Sympathy for Protestantism was essentially because liberals longed for an educational system to replace the scholastic system of the Jesuits; for this it was necessary to follow the path of pragmatic education, more inclined toward science and technology, to move away from the traditionalism of the humanities. The fact that Justo Rufino Barrios was an active Freemason was not antagonistic to the Protestantism of that time; moreover, they shared common traits, for example: the defense of freedom of worship, opposition to the monopoly of the Catholic Church, ideas of ethical values, democracy and their theoretical perspective on labor.

== Presidency of Justo Rufino Barrios and attempt to reunify Central America ==
In 1873 Justo Rufino Barrios was elected president of Guatemala, who would follow a much more radical line than that of Miguel García Granados, and who would be known in Guatemala for having declared secular education, free and compulsory, and who would carry out social, cultural, economic and legislative reforms. During his government, Barrios established an anticlerical policy, suppressing brotherhoods and religious orders, and expropriating church property, and also established the Constitution of 1879 in which the establishment of monasteries in the country was explicitly prohibited. (Note: It should not be assumed that Barrios attacked the Catholic Church for religious reasons. The Church was the most powerful conservative landowner and the one most opposed to the system of distributing indigenous laborers to the new liberal coffee landowners; Barrios therefore attacked it to remove its power and its assets.)

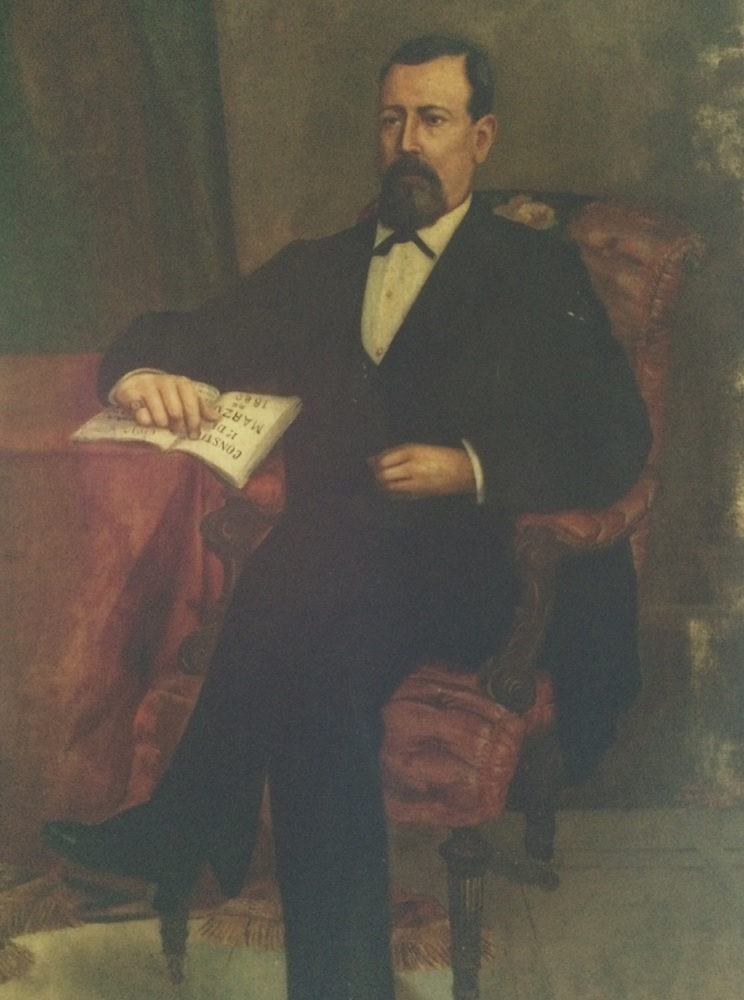
Justo Rufino Barrios Leader of the Liberal Reform and President of Guatemala from 1873 to 1885. National Museum of History of Guatemala

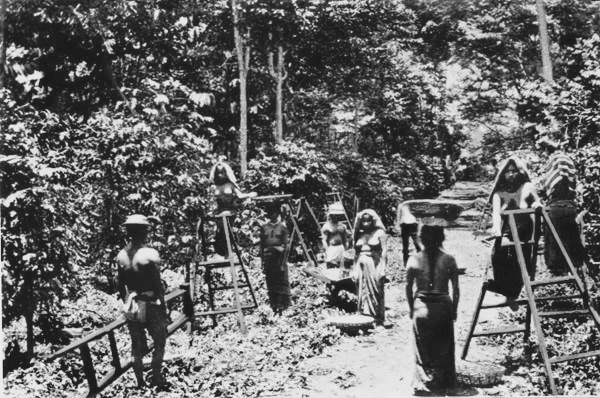
'"Temporeras"'—day laborers—on a coffee plantation in 1875. The temporeras went from the Guatemalan highlands to work in warm regions for the harvest of arabica coffee—i.e., tall-tree coffee. The overseer is the male worker. Photograph by Eadweard Muybridge.

Two important economic factors occurred in this period:

1. Large-scale coffee production was introduced. (Note: This was because liberal landowners in the west were the main promoters of the Revolution. Likewise, the introduction of the railway was due to the need to transport the grain to the country's ports.)
2. In order to reward the military who collaborated with the revolution, indigenous lands were expropriated, extensions of land where Guatemalan indigenous people had lived since colonial times. Likewise, the rotation of indigenous people among the properties of the new landowners was instituted. During Barrios's government, indigenous people were dispossessed of the tierras de indios, which were distributed among the officers who helped him during the Liberal Reform. Decree 170 (or Decree of Redemption of Censuses) facilitated the expropriation of land from indigenous people in favor of officers and German settlers in the Verapaces, by promoting the public auction of communal lands. Communal property, dedicated to subsistence crops, became private property aimed at large-scale cultivation and commercialization of agricultural products. Therefore, the fundamental characteristics of the productive system, since the time of Barrios, were the accumulation of property in few hands and a kind of "estate servitude", based on the exploitation of mozos colonos.

During his administration he continued the policy initiated in the previous presidency, undertaking a vast program of reforms that covered, among other aspects, the Church, the economy and education. He founded the Mortgage Bank, the so-called Hospital of the East, the Polytechnic School and ordered the construction of the General Cemetery of Guatemala and the Central Penitentiary of Guatemala. In addition, during his presidency, the first telegraph and railway lines were laid in Guatemala, and the contract for the construction of the Southern Railway was signed. In administrative and legal matters, the Penal Code, the Military Code and the Fiscal Code were promulgated. (Note: Some of these laws are still in force in Guatemala.) Likewise, the departments of Retalhuleu and Baja Verapaz were created and free public education was established through schools throughout the country, while brotherhoods and religious orders were simultaneously suppressed. Barrios also dissolved the Legislative Assembly and convened a constituent assembly composed solely of his supporters to promulgate the Constitution of 1879, tailored to his needs. The following year, he was re-elected president for a six-year term. To give an appearance of democracy, he also submitted his resignation to the Legislative Assembly on two occasions, which was not accepted in either case.

Barrios legalized the dispossession of communal lands of peasants: while rural authorities systematically rejected purchase petitions from communities, they granted communal lands—declared vacant—preferably to foreigners, since General Barrios believed that a "German was worth two hundred peasants". On the other hand, in San Marcos there were lands suitable for coffee, of which hundreds of caballerías were quickly acquired by Barrios and his associates, and in Huehuetenango, a ladino obtained five hundred caballerías of communal lands, whose peasants could only acquire plots of three to five cuerdas. In Escuintla, in 1877, the Herrera family—which later came to own large sugar mills—acquired ninety caballerías of the communal lands of Santa Lucía Cotzumalguapa and Siquinalá.

Alta Verapaz was where the Germans concentrated: by the end of the 19th century German landowners came to concentrate in their hands three quarters of the total area of the department's 8,686 km². In addition, it was found that peasants fled their towns to avoid falling into the hands of landowners, who, in addition to dispossessing them of their lands, forced them to work on coffee plantations and processing plants.

To guarantee the supply of mozos colonos, he decreed the Reglamento de Jornaleros, labor legislation that placed the indigenous population practically at the disposal of the interests of the new coffee latifundists, and the traditional conservatives—with the notable exception of the regular clergy of the Catholic Church, which was expelled from the country. The decree established the following for indigenous people:

1. They were obliged to work on estates when the owners needed them and regardless of where they were located.
2. They were placed under the supervision of local authorities, who ensured that indigenous contingents were sent to the estates.
3. They were subject to the habilitación: forced advance payment, indebting the worker and justifying his transfer to estates and his retention there.
4. Creation of the libreto de jornaleros: a document proving the worker's solvency with his employer, without which the worker was subject to the rigors of authorities and estate owners.

As a result of the regulation, there was a notable increase in exports, and trade with capitalist countries was activated; both the old aristocratic conservatives and the new coffee landowners benefited from these measures.

What Barrios's economic policy achieved was the creation of capitalism in the country's agriculture; many of the new German landowners were capitalists or had credit in powerful banks or trading houses in Hamburg. It is estimated that by 1898—when the government of lawyer Manuel Estrada Cabrera began—Germans had invested in Guatemala more than one hundred twenty million U.S. dollars. On the other hand, due to the high level of corruption in the liberal government, many nouveaux riches emerged from its ranks, including Justo Rufino Barrios, who as the main promoter of the liberal agrarian reform quickly became the principal coffee exporter in the country.

=== Internal politics ===
Barrios vigorously persecuted the opposition, forcing many Guatemalans to flee into exile. During his exile, the Cuban poet José Martí arrived in Guatemala: he came from Mexico disappointed with the regime of General Porfirio Díaz and with the hope of finding a better one under Barrios. During his stay in Guatemala in 1877 he met María García Granados y Saborío, daughter of Miguel García Granados, whom he courted, but being already engaged, he could not reciprocate. Martí married in 1878 and a few months later María died of a pulmonary illness aggravated by having gone swimming with some friends. Martí dedicated to her in 1891 Poem IX, known as the famous poem La Niña de Guatemala. Devastated by María's death and disappointed with Barrios's government, Martí left Guatemala.

=== Constitution of 1879 ===
Barrios convened a National Constituent Assembly to issue a new constitution. The constitution was finally issued in 1879 and the final document served to satisfy the needs of President Justo Rufino Barrios, who had already been president since 1873 and to whom corresponded the first constitutional term of six years, which began in March 1879.

Among the characteristics of the constitution was that only those who could read and write or who had a profession or trade, and members of the army, were considered citizens, leaving excluded the great majority of the country's indigenous population, which was illiterate. It also guaranteed dignified and fair treatment for prisoners, which was violated again and again by all the regimes that governed under it, especially those of Barrios himself, and those of lawyer Manuel Estrada Cabrera and General Jorge Ubico.

The Constitution was decreed on December 11, 1879 and the Executive Branch put into effect the "Ejecútese" on December 12 of the same year.

=== The Chiapas question and the interim presidency of José María Orantes ===
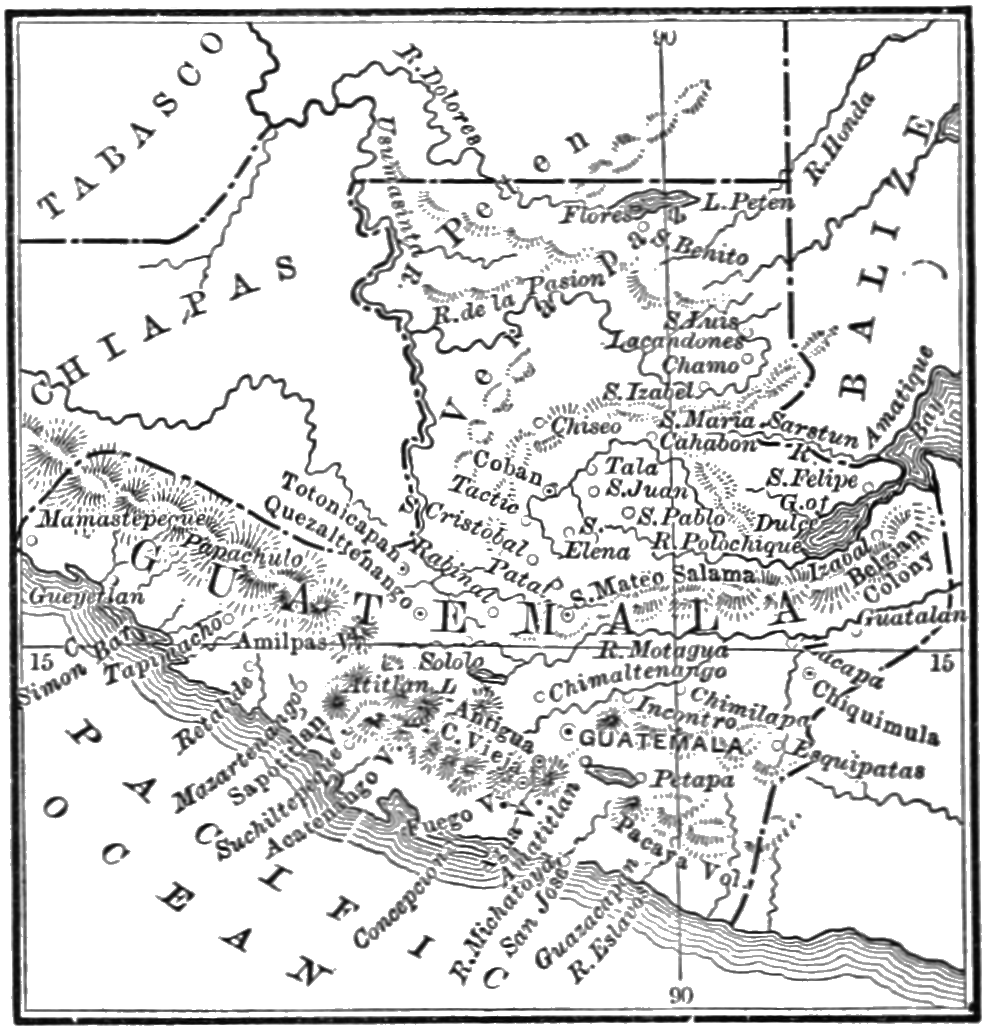
Map of the border of Mexico and Guatemala, before the Herrera-Mariscal treaties of 1882.

«This boundary agreement, with which a long period of negotiations and the subsequent demarcation of the border that resulted from it culminated, constituted fundamental events for Guatemala in its late-19-century history. By this treaty, Guatemala renounced not only discussing its rights over Chiapas and Soconusco, but the rights themselves. The opportunity for further claims was definitively closed, without even asking absolutely anything in return; this agreement hermetically closed the door to any subsequent claim, since by Guatemala ceding Chiapas and Soconusco, it expressly and categorically renounced any compensation or indemnity. This is a singular example, in the annals of International Law, of an arrangement between two countries in which one of them came to make a generous surrender of its positions and definitively closed the door to subsequent claims, without asking anything in return».

— Solís Castañeda, 2013

After the Mexican–American War (1846–1848), Mexico ended up losing two and a half million square kilometers by the Treaty of Guadalupe Hidalgo from its northern border; consequently, it expanded its borders over an area that belonged to Guatemala: Mexico settled the Soconusco issue through a military invasion, to which Guatemala protested on September 12, 1842 when the Guatemalan Minister of Foreign Affairs sent an extensive letter to his Mexican counterpart, but war was not declared and diplomatic relations were not broken since Guatemala was too weak to fight such a battle. Guatemala limited itself to sending that letter and a protest to all the countries with which it had diplomatic relations on November 17, 1842, denouncing the military occupation by Mexican president Antonio López de Santa Anna in Chiapas and Soconusco.

Despite the disparity of forces with Mexico, Guatemala maintained its claim over the territories of Chiapas and Soconusco for forty more years, but the participation and pressure of General Justo Rufino Barrios in the settlement of limits between Guatemala and Mexico in 1882 precipitated the resolution of a dispute in which Guatemala ended up yielding all its positions in favor of Barrios's particular policy of eliminating obstacles that opposed his project of Central American union. Barrios must have believed that ending the boundary question with Mexico through the signing of a definitive treaty secured his rear, since it left Mexico satisfied with the cession of Chiapas and Soconusco; furthermore, he counted on El Salvador—whose president he had installed himself—with Honduras—where he had installed Marco Aurelio Soto in 1876 and later replaced him when it no longer suited him—and, supposedly, with the support of the United States, to which he had offered control of a future interoceanic canal.

Engineer Claudio Urrutia, head of the Guatemala Boundary Commission between 1896 and 1900, stated in his report to the Government of the Republic of Guatemala in 1900 that: "[...] the treaty was fatal for Guatemala. In everything with which the boundary question was related during that time, there is something hidden that no one has been able to discover, and that forced the people who took part in it for Guatemala to proceed hastily or as if compelled by powerful pressure, they handled matters with ideas foreign to them or in an unconscious manner". And he continued: "Guatemala lost on one side about 15,000 km and gained on the other about 5,140 km. Result: a loss of 10,300 km. Guatemala lost fourteen towns, nineteen villages and fifty-four hamlets, with more than 15,000 Guatemalans, while Mexico lost one town and twenty-eight hamlets with 2,500 inhabitants: judge the fairness in the compensations". (Note: All copies of the Memoria sobre la Cuestión de Límites were collected by order of President Manuel Estrada Cabrera shortly after being distributed; and according to historian Solís Castañeda, the same occurred with the second edition (1964) and with the book Grandezas y Miserias de la Vida Diplomática, which were confiscated in 1968 by instructions of the Ministry of Foreign Affairs of the government of President Julio César Méndez Montenegro.)

José María Orantes was appointed Interim President on June 23, 1882, due to the trip of Justo Rufino Barrios and his friend and adviser Ángel María Arroyo to New York City to sign the boundary treaty with Mexico on August 12 of that year.

As a result of the signing of this treaty, Barrios and Arroyo became estranged from Dr. Lorenzo Montúfar y Rivera, who had been one of their main collaborators since the Liberal Reform and who strongly opposed the cession of the Soconusco territories to Mexico.

=== Attempts at Central American unification ===
Barrios returned on January 5, 1884 to the presidency. In 1885, with the support of Honduras, he undertook a military campaign to forcibly restore Central American union. To carry out his plans, Barrios invaded El Salvador in March 1885, while troops from Costa Rica and Nicaragua prepared to confront those of Honduras. However, the plans for Central American reunification were suddenly frustrated, as the Guatemalan president died in the Battle of Chalchuapa, shortly after his troops invaded El Salvador.

Military actions of the Central American unification campaign
Date	Military action	Description
28 February 1885	Proclamation of Barrios	General Justo Rufino Barrios declared supreme chief of Central America by legislative decree of February 28.
30 March 1885	Action of El Coco	General Justo Rufino Barrios moved toward the border with El Salvador on March 23. On March 30 the Jalapa battalion attacked Salvadoran positions at El Coco, forcing the defenders to withdraw to Chalchuapa.
31 March 1885	Action of San Lorenzo	Guatemalan General Pimentel attacked the entrenched camp of San Lorenzo, dislodging the forces of Colonel Regino Monterrosa.
1 April 1885	Siege of Chalchuapa	From March 31 the Guatemalans took positions near Chalchuapa and on April 1 began bombarding Salvadoran positions, commanded by Generals Mora and Figueroa.
2 April 1885	Battle of Chalchuapa	In the morning six infantry columns attacked Chalchuapa from the north and east; the extreme left column intercepted the road connecting Chalchuapa with Santa Ana where it repelled Salvadoran forces under General Jaime Ávila and Colonel Ignacio Marcial. The third column attacked Casa Blanca, while the fourth and fifth attacked the plaza and the sixth, under General Monterroso, advanced from the Refugio side. All advanced protected by cannons positioned on Cerro Tachipehuil. The Jalapa troops fought fiercely in Casa Blanca, where Barrios reportedly went to support the troops, but was mortally wounded instantly. Another version indicates that Barrios died in an ambush while attempting to bribe Salvadoran soldiers, and his body was taken to the battlefield to appear as if he had died in combat. Upon learning of Barrios's death, a general retreat was ordered.

=== Economy ===
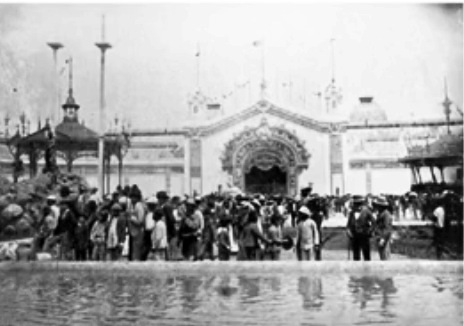
Hall of the Central American Exposition of 1897.

The power of landowners over peasants increased under Reina Barrios's mandate and the large amount of currency he minted for his projects caused inflation and made him unpopular. This excess of circulating currency was due to indebtedness for infrastructure works and for the holding of the Central American Exposition in 1897 which, ironically, had been planned to show Guatemala's agricultural, cultural and commercial advances to potential foreign investors but failed when the interoceanic railway could not be completed on time. That railway would have been the best offer for foreign investors, since by 1897 the war between the United States and Spain over the island of Cuba had not yet occurred and the Panama Canal had not yet been built.

The entry of Brazil into the coffee market, which by then was already the fundamental crop of liberal governments and landowners, was another determining factor in the fall of the Guatemalan economy. This caused heavy indebtedness, mainly with British banks, which was the main factor for his successor, lawyer Manuel Estrada Cabrera, to eagerly seek the political, economic and military support of the United States, since in those days European nations resorted to military invasions when they had to collect the debts of the former Spanish colonies (as was the case of the French invasion of Mexico in the 19th century).

In June 1896 it was reported that Guatemalan society had been shaken by cablegrams reporting that there had been a fall in coffee; the cultural magazines that circulated among the country's educated circles commented that the golden dreams of liquidating by selling estates at fabulous prices, recreational trips to Europe and pearl and diamond adornments for ladies would be set aside. In February 1897, the effects of inflation were already noticeable in all strata of society: the costs of the basic basket increased, the measure of suppressing customs duties on essential goods did not prevent the rise in prices, and support was requested for national agriculture since even the hay for the horses of the Creoles' carriages and the corn that indigenous people used to make their tortillas were imported. And finally, it was requested that national products be consumed, since shops were stocked with all kinds of foreign products, although national products were of similar quality.

Sections and stations of the Interoceanic Railway built during the government of Reina Barrios. Note that the section that could not be completed in time for the exposition was the mountainous section between Panajax and Guatemala City, due to the complexity of the work required for that purpose and the fall of the national economy.

In March 1897, coinciding with the beginning of the Central American Exposition, the cultural magazine La Ilustración Guatemalteca published a detailed analysis of Guatemala's economic situation. By then, the country's banks sensed a bad situation and had sought to improve their credits by demanding fiduciary guarantees, withdrawing credits and circulating notices, with which they managed to generate panic among the Guatemalan population. On the other hand, some banks had considerably increased the interest rate, taking advantage of the concession they had from the government to issue banknotes.

At that time, the cessation of the rise in the prices of public securities had become a rapid and discouraging decline; for example, shares of the International Bank fell from $5,500 to $5,000 between June 1896 and February 1897, while Exposition and Northern Railway bonds fell from $90 and $44 to $80 and $32, respectively, in the same period. Only the shares of the Banco de Occidente and the floating debt bonds remained stable since the bank's shares could not be any lower, yielding 11% per share; of the floating debt bonds, originally issued for three million pesos, only $380,000 remained, which were held by a small circle of wealthy people, who did not offer them because they had no need to do so at the time.

According to the analysis of La Ilustración Guatemalteca, in March 1897 there was a complete paralysis in business due to an almost absolute lack of cash, a very serious situation that was beginning to affect commerce, agriculture, industry and other sources of wealth. The causes of this serious problem were the excessive development that the government of Reina Barrios had given to fictitious needs—that is, the beautification of Guatemala City, the Acatán project and the million-peso expenditure on the Central American Exposition—without having taken into account the true state of the national accounts and for which it needed many private resources obtained through bonds. This attitude had spread to the general population, since families had entered an era of luxury and vanity in which carriages, stables, footmen with luxurious livery, visits to the theatre and other things were sought, on which more was spent than the families had in income; this resulted in abuse of credit and speculation. It was considered at the time that the only solution was complete austerity with a plan of economies and absolute abstention from all unnecessary expenditure, and it was feared that state bankruptcy would be reached.

On the other hand, it was indicated that the country produced only coffee and had no other fruit with which to meet the countless needs increased by the bonds for the Northern Railway, for Acatán and for the Exposition, among others; on the other hand, everything was imported and consequently, the country was a debtor not only for the amount of the goods, but also for currency exchange, freight and commissions. Guatemalan exports did not reach twenty million pesos and, since many estates were in foreign hands, the total value of exports did not return to the country.

In summary, there remained no balance that could equilibrate Guatemala's trade balance in 1897 and austerity measures were recommended, along with a long-term loan negotiated on good terms, and not like those that until then had been made by Guatemalan governments, which not only had excessive interest rates, but were not administered honestly.

On March 10, the opposition newspaper La República published that there was no rejoicing among the Guatemalan population over the holding of the Exposition, despite its majesty; this apathy was due to concern over the economic and political events of recent months. It was pointed out that from the beginning the idea of holding the exposition had not been well received—although the country's economic situation was very good at that time—and that in 1897 the crisis made the celebration exceedingly unpopular: the shortage of money, the reduction of business and the imposition of greater sacrifices to finance the Exposition made citizens reject it completely.

At the end of March 1897, strong editorials against the government continued in La República. One indicated that the Northern Railway line had not been completed and that almost twelve million Guatemalan pesos were needed for this, and that if such work were suspended, the cost of maintaining what had already been built would cost nearly four and a half million Guatemalan pesos. The editors of La República accused the government of squandering the treasury because it tried to do everything at once: apart from the Northern Railway—which by itself would have brought great economic benefits to Guatemala—boulevards, parks, squares and sumptuous buildings had been built, in addition to spending three million Guatemalan pesos on the Exposition. La República went even a little further and accused the president of appropriating state property. In another strong article against the government, it accused it of deficient water management—which was obtained in part from the Acatán project—and of being used in the fountains of the Exposition, leaving the population of Guatemala City without supplies.

When the government realized that the Central American Exposition was going to fail, it caused a decrease in the amount of circulating silver currency when it relieved the banks of Guatemala from paying in current gold or silver coin, authorizing them to do so with their own banknotes, of which there were then around 10 million pesos in circulation. On August 15, 1897, La Ilustración del Pacífico published a severe editorial on the country's economic situation, pointing out that the money generated when the price of coffee was high had been squandered in such a way that when it fell in international markets a strong economic crisis occurred as a result of the devaluation of the circulating currency. In the same publication it was reported that the Banco Agrícola Hipotecario was announcing with large signs that it exchanged its banknotes for drafts at the market rate, that at the door of the Banco Intercontinental there was a guard threatening people who came to exchange their banknotes, and that the opposition newspaper La República reported that the cost of milk, eggs and fish was so high that only well-off families could afford them and requested that tariffs on flour be reduced so as not to weaken the population.

By a later decree, he ordered the gradual exchange of the banknotes for silver in the first months of 1898, but this was not carried out due to the assassination of the president in February of that year.

=== Art and education ===
In education the government of General Reina Barrios is one of those that can show the best record. Only that General Reina Barrios, at the end, induced by the incapable elements that surrounded him in his final days, even decreed the closure of the schools, with Don Mariano Cruz, as Minister of the branch, countersigning such an unusual measure. In those anguished days, many noble spirits founded, from one day to the next, the foundations of a Popular university, which would fill the gaps forced by the official provision.

— Taken from the article by Hernández de León, F.: El capítulo de las efemérides, Diario La Hora, April 22, 1959.

At the beginning of his government, he gave a powerful boost to education. The normal schools were the object of his attention and work, although he did not have time to complete this work. At the end of his first year in government, the president made a visit to towns (visits that Guatemalan presidents made with some frequency until 1944) and collected many boys from the public schools of the towns and gave scholarships to the best ones for the Normal School of Antigua. This school operated in the convents of San Sebastián and then in that of the Society of Jesus.

On March 21, 1893, Legislative Decree 193 provided that the boards of directors of the faculties of the National University would be appointments of the executive, as would the professors of the faculty schools. The faculties would not proceed to elect their boards of directors, and could not open chairs to competition. That same year the Agricultural Institute for Indigenous People was created, which was originally established on the Aceituno estate in 1894 under the direction of Adolfo Vendrell. At that school agricultural technology was taught as well as Spanish grammar and instruction in the metric system; later, in April 1896, the school was moved to its new building, built in the fields of La Reforma, where it was under the direction of José María Fuentes.

In 1897, due to the economic crisis derived from the beautification of infrastructure and the failure of the Central American Exposition, there were serious economic problems in the country, which were reflected in education. In a publication of the Diario de Centro América of February 20 of that year, the director of the Instituto Nacional Central para Varones—then the best secondary education establishment for boys in Guatemala—was urged to make an effort to pay a good professor of mathematics, geometry and trigonometry, since for three years this education had been neglected and students who wished to enter the Faculty School of Engineering were required to take a preliminary examination. The situation worsened: Reina Barrios was forced to save on education, closing schools and the National University.

==== National Anthem ====
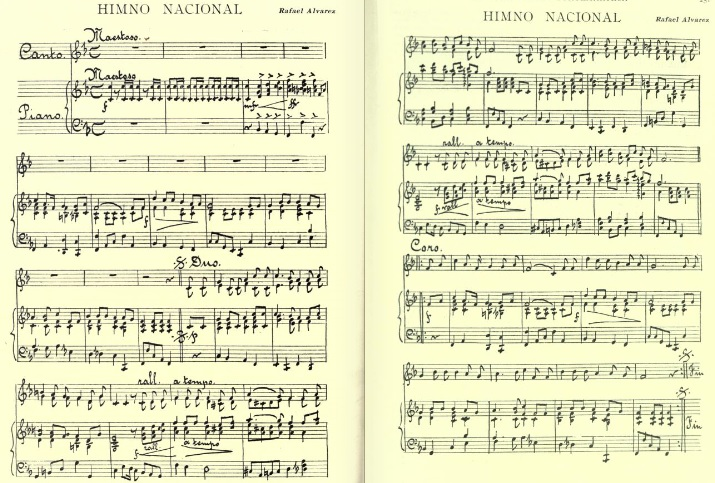
Score of the National Anthem of Guatemala published in La Ilustración Guatemalteca in 1897.

=== Foreign policy ===
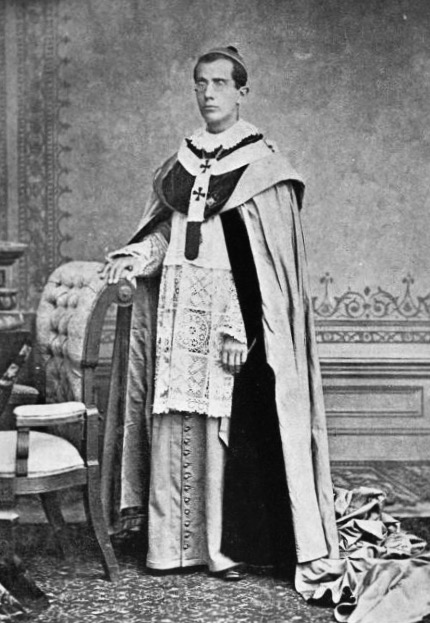
Lic. Ricardo Casanova y Estrada, archbishop of Guatemala upon his return to the country in March 1897. Photograph by Alberto G. Valdeavellano.

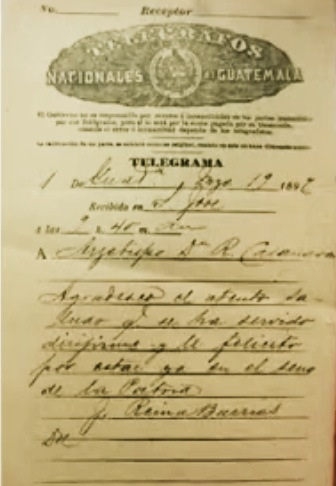
Telegram sent to the archbishop of Guatemala by General José María Reina Barrios after his return to Guatemala in 1897.

In 1897, he issued an amnesty that allowed the return of Archbishop Ricardo Casanova y Estrada to Guatemala, who had been expelled by President Manuel Lisandro Barillas Bercián. The archbishop arrived on March 19 of that year, accompanied by Father Juan Paz; when he arrived at Puerto San José on the steamship Newport, a crowd came to receive him and listened submissively to the mass celebrated by the prelate. He then left by train for the city, where he was received by an enormous crowd at the station, and then they accompanied him to the Plaza de Armas; there were also people on the rooftops and in the windows of the houses, who frantically acclaimed the newcomer.

Even the agnostic writers of La Ilustración Guatemalteca, such as A. Macías del Real, could not help congratulating the archbishop, who arrived from Rome, nor could they deny that Catholicism was at that time the predominant religion in the country.

=== Extension of his mandate ===
In January 1897 revolts against the government of Reina Barrios began; on January 28 Guatemalan territory was invaded by a group of revolutionaries composed of about one hundred fifty men armed with Remington, Winchester and Lebel rifles. As soon as the government learned of the matter, it sent troops to contain the invaders, who caught up with them on February 2 at a place called Granadías; after the combat, the invaders were defeated and their leaders—Tadeo Trabanino, Braulio Martínez, Juan Vargas and Anselmo Fajardo—were captured, tried and shot the same day. The rebels who managed to escape fled to El Salvador and it was later learned that they had already instituted a preliminary central governing junta, which was to be headed by Guatemalan citizen José León Castillo, who later reported that he had indeed been in correspondence with Tadeo Trabanino, the main leader of the revolt.

Around those same days, opinion articles began to appear in which Barrios's regime was branded as tyrannical, alleging that it had not allowed the political parties guaranteed by law to develop. There were also articles that doubted the government's ability to carry out the Central American Exposition and the presidential elections at the same time; the elections were an important issue at that time, because it had already been reported that there was a motion to reform the Constitution with the intention of eliminating the prohibition on re-election, but that it had not proceeded in 1896 because the ten legislators required to initiate the process had not met; however, by February 1897 that number of legislators had already gathered.

On March 5, 1897 Próspero Morales resigned from his position as Secretary of Public Instruction to participate as a presidential candidate in the presidential elections scheduled for that year. In his resignation letter addressed to President Reina Barrios, Morales indicated that he did so based on the principle of alternation stipulated by the Constitution of Guatemala and because he wanted to combat, from the political plane, the measures taken by the president's government, without being accused of betraying the president or taking cover from his high official position. At the end of March, strong editorials against the government were published in the opposition newspaper La República, indicating that the Northern Railway line had not been completed and that almost twelve million Guatemalan pesos were needed for this, and that if such work were suspended, the cost of maintaining what had already been built would cost close to four and a half million Guatemalan pesos. The editors of La República accused the government of squandering the treasury because it tried to do everything at once: apart from the Northern Railway—which by itself would have brought great economic benefits to Guatemala—boulevards, parks, squares and sumptuous buildings had been built, in addition to spending three million Guatemalan pesos on the Central American Exposition. La República went a little further and accused the president of appropriating state property.

In May the rejection of the measure of the president's re-election was greater, which was described as an attack on the Constitution, and publications favoring it were refused. And when the Acatán water project began to show deficiencies and lack of water, the criticisms of the opposition newspaper La República—which by then already had six years of existence—were so strong that the government suspended it in mid-May 1897 until it conclusively demonstrated that General Reina Barrios had squandered the nation's revenues and had misused them, for which the government made the Executive's accounting books available to the newspaper's editors.

By decree of April 24, 1897, the National Legislative Assembly extended its sessions for as long as necessary. Four days later, and a few days before being dissolved by the president, by Decree No. 360 of April 28, it appointed lawyer Manuel Estrada Cabrera and General Manuel Soto as first and second presidential designates, respectively.

On May 31, 1897 the Legislative Assembly was dissolved; the publication La Ilustración Guatemalteca described this event as follows: "Based on the following circumstances, the Executive assumed the Powers of the Republic. The Assembly sought to break the bonds of good harmony among the Powers of the Nation, and went so far as to enact unconstitutional laws and, therefore, inconvenient and even contradictory ones. The minority was reduced, increasingly, to the number of nine deputies who could not even meet in session on May 31 last, thus leaving the august National Representation dissolved, in fact." After dissolving the Assembly, he called a new Constituent Assembly in August 1897, which extended his mandate for another four years according to the decree issued in August 1897. Among the constituent deputies who voted in favor of the extension were lawyer Antonio Batres Jáuregui—who was several times Minister of Foreign Affairs of Guatemala and ambassador of Guatemala to the United States—and Mr. Carlos Herrera y Luna—who in 1920 would be designated President of Guatemala.

=== Quetzaltenango Revolution of 1897 ===
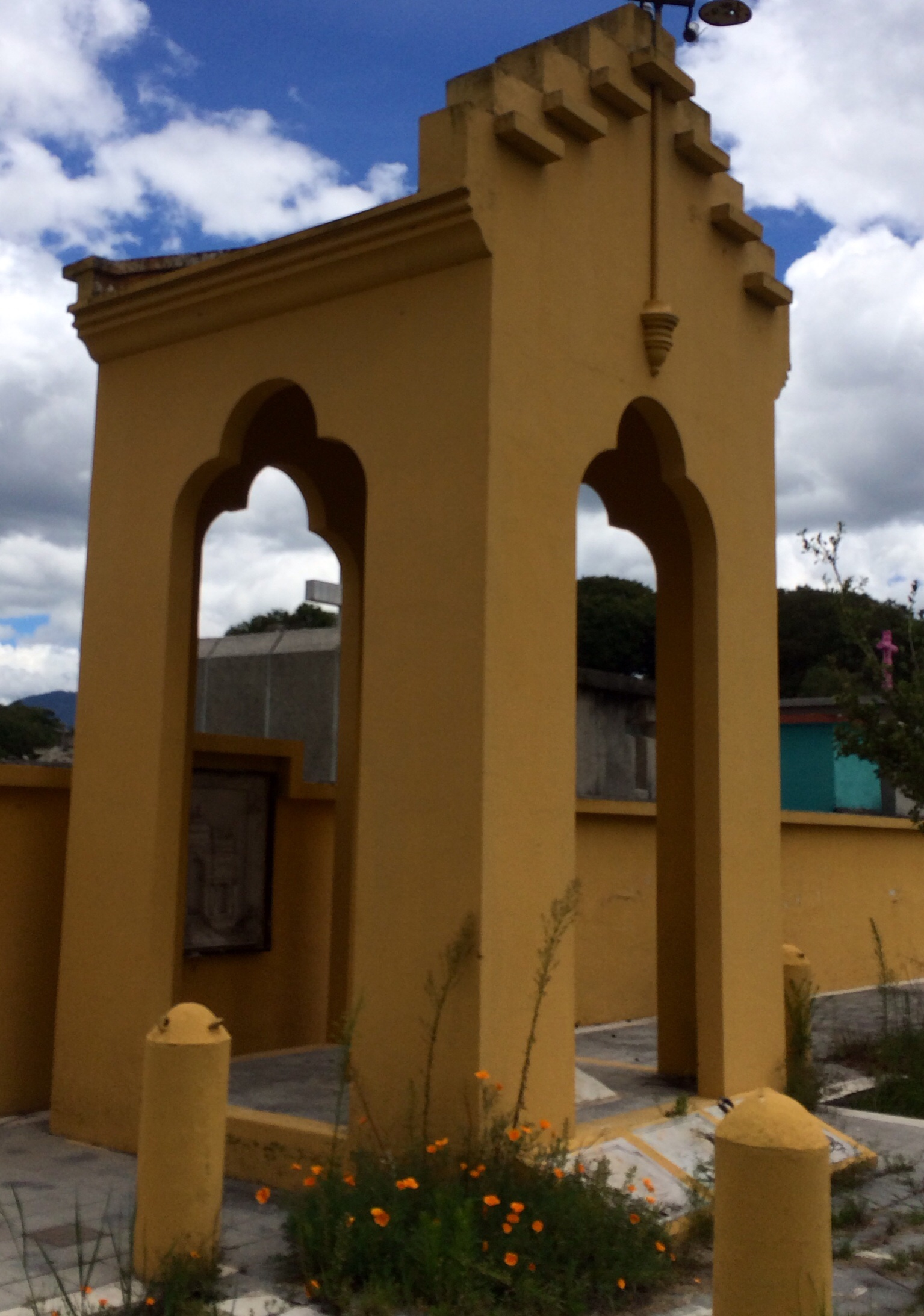
Monument and Pantheon of the Martyrs of 1897 in Quetzaltenango in 2014.

The forced extension of Reina's government created discontent among the Guatemalan population, which realized that the ruler's intentions were no longer solely the progress of the country. Protests took place and on September 7 insurgents seized the barracks and public offices of San Marcos and marched toward Quetzaltenango with an improvised army formed by workers, merchants and professionals. The leaders of the movement, Juan Aparicio, Jr. (a wealthy philanthropist), and Sinforoso Aguilar (first mayor of Quetzaltenango), were betrayed by a supposed friend and handed over to the soldiers loyal to Reina Barrios. The president ordered them shot on September 13 without prior trial.

Quetzaltenango society begged the president that the condemned men not be shot, to which Reina Barrios finally agreed and asked his Minister of the Interior, Estrada Cabrera, to telegraph the message. The minister—who was also from Quetzaltenango and had a personal quarrel with Aparicio—delayed sending the telegram, which arrived at its destination after Aparicio's death. Apparently, Estrada Cabrera had a personal problem with Aparicio because he had failed to take over the Quetzaltenango Electric Company, and took advantage of the circumstance to eliminate him. Upon realizing this, Reina Barrios sent Estrada Cabrera to Costa Rica on a diplomatic commission; upon returning from that country, Estrada Cabrera was removed as Secretary of the Interior.

== See also ==
- History of Guatemala
- Rafael Carrera
