= José María Orantes =

Guatemalan military man

General José María Orantes
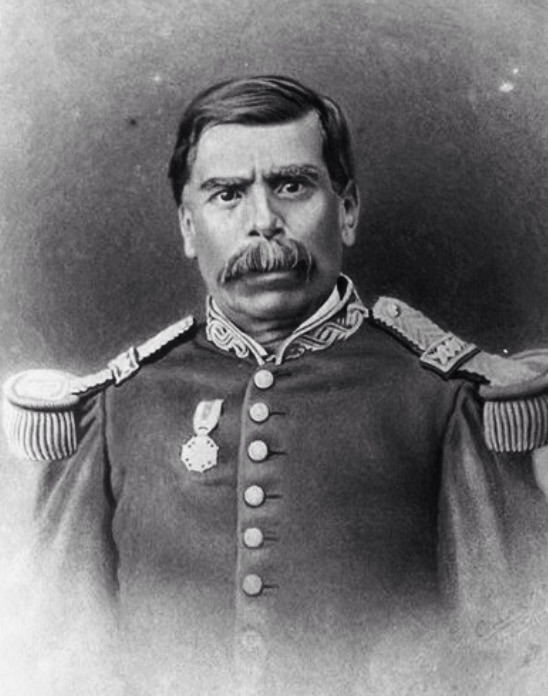

Acting President of Guatemala
- In office 23 June 1882 – 5 January 1883 Serving with Justo Rufino Barrios (Note: Justo Rufino Barrios had to leave to New York City in order to sign the treaty of limits with Mexico, since 12 August 1882, the Assembly appointed to José María Orantes, acting president of Guatemala, on 23 June 1882. Orantes serving with General Justo Rufino Barrios until on his return on 6 January 1883.)
- President: Justo Rufino Barrios

First Vice President of the Republic of Guatemala
- In office 27 April 1883 – 30 April 1884
- President: Justo Rufino Barrios
- Preceded by: Julián Salguero
- Succeeded by: Alejandro M. Sinibaldi

Personal details
- Spouse: Rafaela Monterroso Cardona

José María Orantes (born in Fraijanes—died in Guatemala City) was a Guatemalan military man, appointed acting president of the Republic of Guatemala from 23 June 1882 to January 5, 1883.

== Biography ==
He was appointed by the Guatemalan National Assembly as a substitute for President Justo Rufino Barrios during his absence from the country. Justo Rufino Barrios had to leave for New York with the purpose of negotiating a boundary dispute with Mexico, 12 August 1882. A second part of his journey was to gain approval for a proposed confederation of the Central American states. Orantes returned the power to General Justo Rufino Barrios on his return the 6 January 1883.

== See also ==
- Justo Rufino Barrios
