= Torre del Reformador =

Coordinates: 14.613027°N 90.516801°W

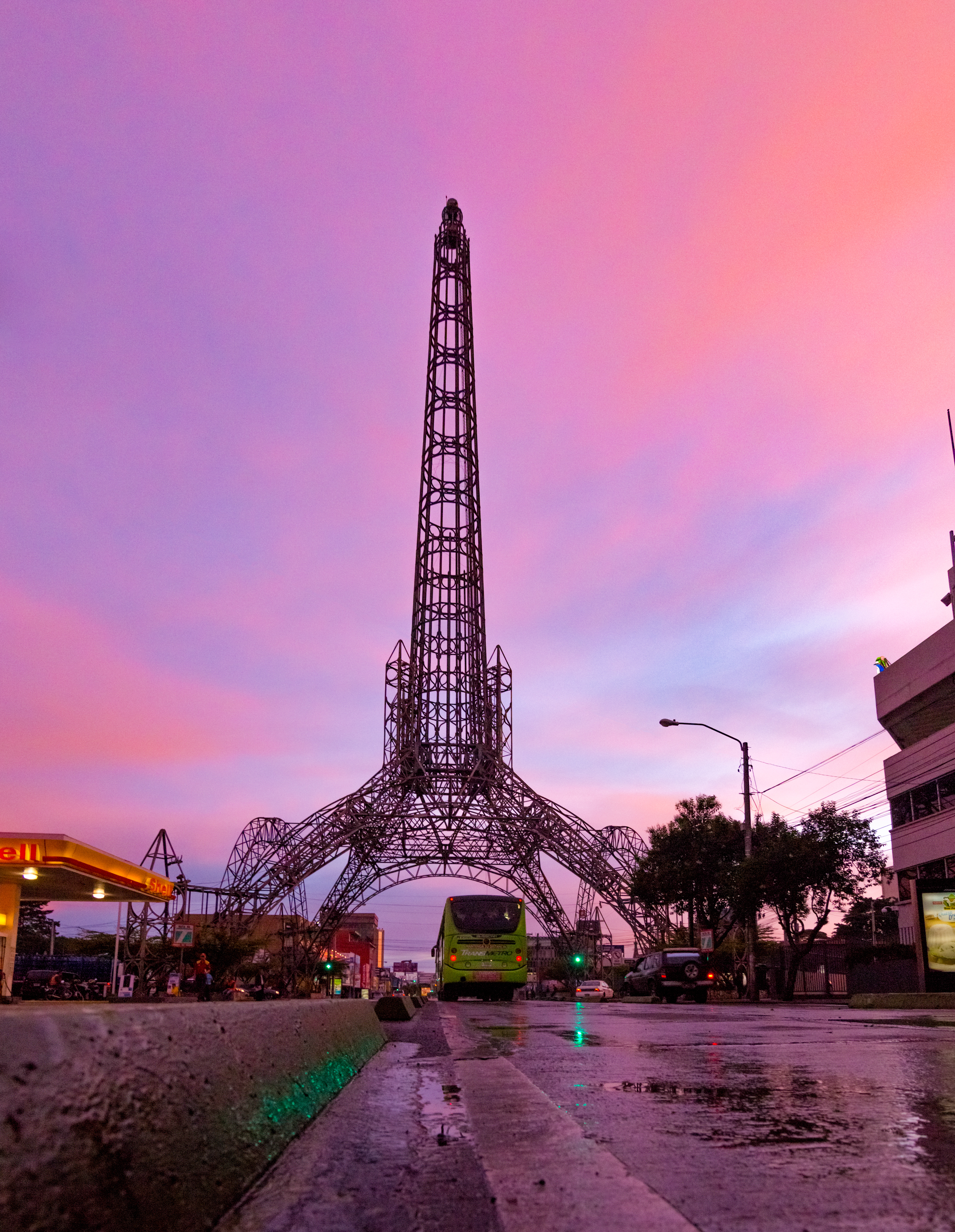
- Torre del Reformador
- Interactive map of the Torre del Reformador area

General information
- Location: 7ª Avenida y 2ª Calle, Zona 9, 01009 Guatemala City, Guatemala
- Completed: 1935
- Owner: Guatemala City, Guatemala

Height
- Height: 71.85 m (236 ft)

Design and construction
- Architect: Arturo Bickford
- Main contractor: United States Steel Products Company

The Torre del Reformador (Tower of the Reformer) is a 71.85 meter (236 ft.) tall steel framework tower in Zone 9 of Guatemala City. The tower was built in 1935, to commemorate the 100th anniversary of the birth of Justo Rufino Barrios, who was President of Guatemala and instituted a number of reforms. The basic shape of the structure resembles the Eiffel Tower. It was originally constructed with a bell on its top, which in 1986 was replaced with a beacon.

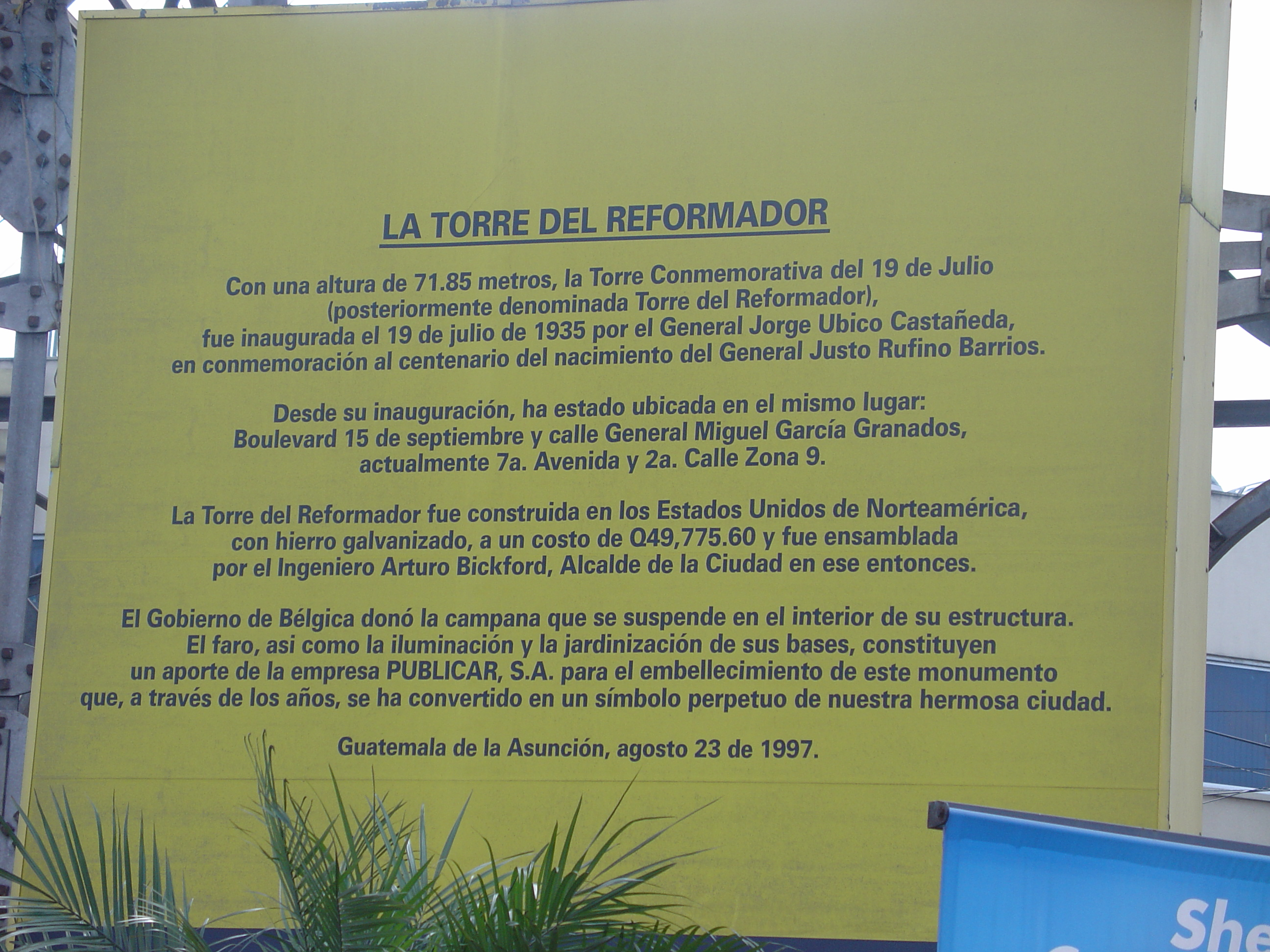
Plaque at the base of the Torre del Reformador

== Commemorative plaque ==
A plaque at the base reads:

Con una altura de 71.85 metros, la Torre Conmemorativa del 19 del Julio (posteriormente denominada Torre del Reformador) fue inagurada el 19 de julio de 1935 por el General Jorge Ubico Castañeda, en conmemoración al centenario del nacimento del General Justo Rufino Barrios.

Desde su inauguración ha estado ubicada en el mismo lugar: Boulevard 15 de septiembre y Calle General Miguel García Granados, actualmente 7a. Avenida y 2a Calle Zona 9.

La Torre del Reformador fue constriuda en los Estados Unidos de Norteamérica, con hierro galvanizado, a un costo de Q49,775.60 y fue ensamblada por el Ingeniero Arturo Bickford, Alcalde de la Ciudad en ese entonces.

El Gobierno de Bélgica donó la campana que se suspende en el interior de su estructura. El faro, asi como la iluminación y la jardinización de sus bases, constituyen un aporte de la empresa PUBLICAR, S.A para el embellecimiento de este monumento que, a través de los años, se ha convertido en un símbolo perpetuo de nuestra hermosa ciudad.

Guatemala de la Asunción, agosto 23 de 1997.

which roughly translates to English as:

With a height of 71.85 meters, the Commemorative Tower of the 19 of the July (later renamed Tower of the Reformer) was inaugurated on the 19 of July 1935 by General Jorge Ubico Castañeda, in commemoration of the one hundredth anniversary of the birth of General Justo Rufino Barrios.

From its inauguration it has been located at 15th of September Boulevard and General Miguel García Granados Street, currently 7th Avenue and 2nd Street, Zone 9.

The Tower of the Reformer was constructed in the United States, with galvanized iron, to a cost of Q49,775.60 and was assembled by the Engineer Arturo Bickford, Mayor of the City at that time.

The Government of Belgium donated the bell that is suspended inside its structure. The light, as well as the beacon and the landscaping of the bases, constitute a contribution of the company PUBLICAR, S.A. for the embellishment of this monument that, through the years, has become a perpetual symbol of our beautiful city.

Guatemala de la Asunción, August 23 of 1997.

== History ==
The tower had been fabricated by the United States Steel Products Company. Its original name was "Torre Conmemorativa del 19 de julio de 1935".

The first electric illumination of the tower happened on 26 September 1958 and was financed by the brewery company Cervecería Centro Americana.

The original beacon light installed on top of the tower burnt out in 1969. The second one, which also burnt out, was replaced in 1984. In 1994, after 10 years of service, the third beacon light was replaced by a fourth one that was donated by the US airline company American Airlines.

== Incidents ==
On 19 December 1985, a 16-year teenager scaled the tower to meditate but froze and could not climb back down. The tower is also a prime spot for suicide attempts. The tower is also sometimes climbed by drunk people.

== See also ==
- List of towers
