= Battle of Chalchuapa =

Battle in El Salvador

- Part of Barrios' War of Reunification
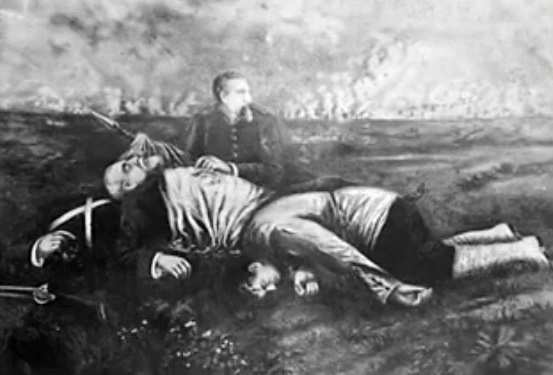
- The death of Justo Rufino Barrios.
Date	1–2 April 1885
Location	Chalchuapa, El Salvador 13°59′N 89°41′W
Result	Salvadoran victory: Death of Justo Rufino Barrios

Belligerents
El Salvador	Guatemala

Commanders and leaders
Adán Mora; Carlos Molina; Indalecio Miranda; Pedro Escalón; Felipe Barrientos; Manuel Montalvo	Justo Barrios †; Adolfo V. Hall †; José Víctor Zavala; Luis Molina; Camilo Álvarez; Felipe Cruz; Manuel Barillas; José Reina; Venancio Barrios †

Strength
5,000 – 8,000	14,500

Casualties and losses
50–200 dead 150 injured	1,500+ dead
- Location within El Salvador

The Battle of Chalchuapa (Spanish: Batalla de Chalchuapa) was a battle between the military forces of El Salvador and Guatemala from 1–2 April 1885. Guatemalan President Justo Rufino Barrios was killed during the battle.

== Background ==
Since the end of Second Central American Civil War from 1838 to 1841, Costa Rica, El Salvador, Guatemala, Honduras, and Nicaragua existed as independent nations that were no longer political entities within the Federal Republic of Central America. During the Liberal Revolution of 30 April 1871, Divisional General Justo Rufino Barrios helped Divisional General Miguel García Granados rise to power and become President of Guatemala, ousting President Vicente Cerna y Cerna in the process. Barrios later became President in 1873 after García Granados retired. Barrios believed in Central American reunification and wanted to recreated a Central American union with himself as President. He was inspired by the unification of Germany under Prussia by Otto von Bismarck to unify Central America under Guatemalan with himself as President.

On 28 February 1885, Barrios proclaimed himself President of Central America and that he had supreme authority over every nation of Central America. The National Assembly of Guatemala approved Barrios' declaration during a meeting on 5 March. Barrios believed the other Central American nations would join his union, but only Honduras approved of Barrios' declaration which they approved on 7 March. Costa Rica, El Salvador, and Nicaragua all denounced the declaration. Barrios mobilized the Guatemalan Army on 10 March in preparation to form his union by force and war began on the afternoon of 29 March 1885. Barrios thought that the threat of force would make El Salvador submit, but he was notified that Salvadoran President Rafael Zaldívar was assembling his own army to defend against the Guatemalans.

== Battle ==
=== 1 April ===
The Salvadorans under Divisional General Adán Mora fortified themselves in the town of Chalchuapa and awaited the Guatemalan attack. At around 11am local time, the Guatemalans began an artillery bombardment of the town to weaken the Salvadoran fortifications. The artillery attack lasted until 3pm local time.

=== 2 April ===
At 6am local time, Camilo Álvarez moved to capture the road connecting Chalchuapa to Santa Ana and Luis Molina covered Álvarez's flanks. The town was surrounded by 9am. Barrios himself took charge of a division and attacked the entrenched Salvadoran positions. Barrios was killed in action by Salvadoran soldiers when he was shot in the heart and fell off his horse. Other reports claim that he was shot by a Guatemalan soldier who shot Barrios by accident.

Felipe Cruz took command of the Guatemalan army after Barrios' death and continued to fight. He attempted to keep news of Barrios' death from reaching the soldiers, but as morale fell when news spread of his death, Cruz ordered a retreat. The Salvadorans were only made aware of Barrios' death and the Guatemalan retreat on 3 April.

== Aftermath ==
Zaldívar attempted to make peace with Cruz after the battle but he rejected the peace offer. Peace was agreed upon after Zaldívar was overthrown by Francisco Menéndez on 22 June 1885.
