= Alejandro M. Sinibaldi =

Guatemalan politician (1825–1896)

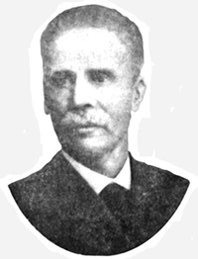

Acting President of Guatemala
- In office April 2, 1885 – April 6, 1885
- Preceded by: Justo Rufino Barrios
- Succeeded by: Manuel Barillas Bercian

First designated to the Presidency of Guatemala
- In office 04:00, April 30, 1884 – April 2, 1885
- President: General Justo Rufino Barrios

Personal details
- Born: Alejandro Manuel Sinibaldi Castro; 1825
- Died: 1896 (aged 70–71)
- Spouse: Carmen Ramírez
- Children: Cristina, María del Carmen, Concepción, Carlos and María Sinibaldi y Ramírez
- Nickname: Flor de un día (Note: One day wonder: because he was president for only a few days.)

Alejandro Manuel Sinibaldi Castro (1825–1896) was acting President of Guatemala from April 2, 1885, to April 5, 1885.

== Biography ==
Of partial Italian descent, Sinibaldi Castro was a businessman who was "First Designate to the Presidency", the equivalent of Vice-President, during the presidency of Justo Rufino Barrios.

When Barrios was killed on April 2, 1885, in El Salvador, Sinibaldi Castro became acting president. However, given that Sinibaldi Castro had no political connections and was not in the military, he was pressured to resign within days of taking over.

His successor was General Manuel Lisandro Barillas, who served as acting president, and was eventually elected as Constitutional President.

== See also ==
- Justo Rufino Barrios
- Manuel Lisandro Barillas

== Bibliography ==
- Hernández de León, Federico (1930). El libro de las efemérides. Vol. Tomo III. Guatemala: Tipografía Nacional.

== Notes ==
| Preceded by Justo Rufino Barrios | President of Guatemala; 1885 (acting) | Succeeded by Manuel Lisandro Barillas |
