= Justo Rufino Barrios =

President of Guatemala from 1873 to 1885

General of Division Justo Rufino Barrios
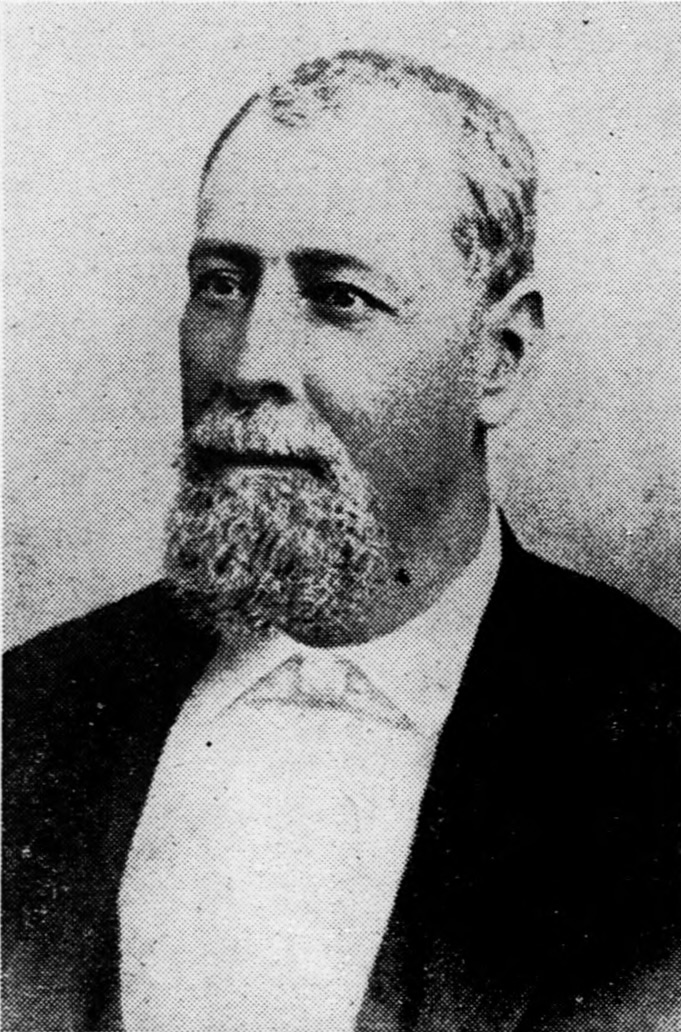
- Barrios, c. 1873–1885

President of Guatemala
- In office 4 June 1873 – 2 April 1885 (Note: Justo Rufino Barrios had to leave to New York City in order to sign the treaty of limits with Mexico, since 12 August 1882, the Assembly appointed to José María Orantes, acting president of Guatemala, in 23 June 1882. Orantes serving with General Justo Rufino Barrios until his return on 6 January 1883.)
- Deputy: José María Orantes; Alejandro M. Sinibaldi
- Preceded by: Miguel García Granados
- Succeeded by: Alejandro M. Sinibaldi

President of the Republic of Central America
- Provisional
- In office 28 February 1885 – 2 April 1885
- Preceded by: Position established
- Succeeded by: Position abolished

Provisional Head of the Government of Guatemala
- In office 30 June 1871 – 4 June 1873 (Note: Justo Rufino Barrios served as Acting President, many times between 1881 and 1883 because Miguel Garcia Granados suffered from frequent health crises.)
- President: Miguel García Granados
- Preceded by: Position established
- Succeeded by: Position abolished Julián Salguero (as First Vice President)

Personal details
- Born: Justo Rufino Barrios Auyón; 19 July 1835 San Lorenzo, San Marcos, Federal Republic of Central America (now in Guatemala)
- Died: 2 April 1885 (aged 49) Chalchuapa, El Salvador
- Party: Liberal
- Spouse: Francisca Aparicio
- Relatives: Celia Barrios de Reyna (sister); Antonio Barrios Reyna (son); Venancio Barrios (son); José María Reina Barrios (nephew)
- Profession: Army General

Justo Rufino Barrios Auyón (19 July 1835 – 2 April 1885) was a Guatemalan politician and military general who served as President of Guatemala from 1873 to his death in 1885. He was known for his liberal reforms and his attempts to reunite Central America. During his rule, Guatemala had a close relationship with the United States.

== Early life ==
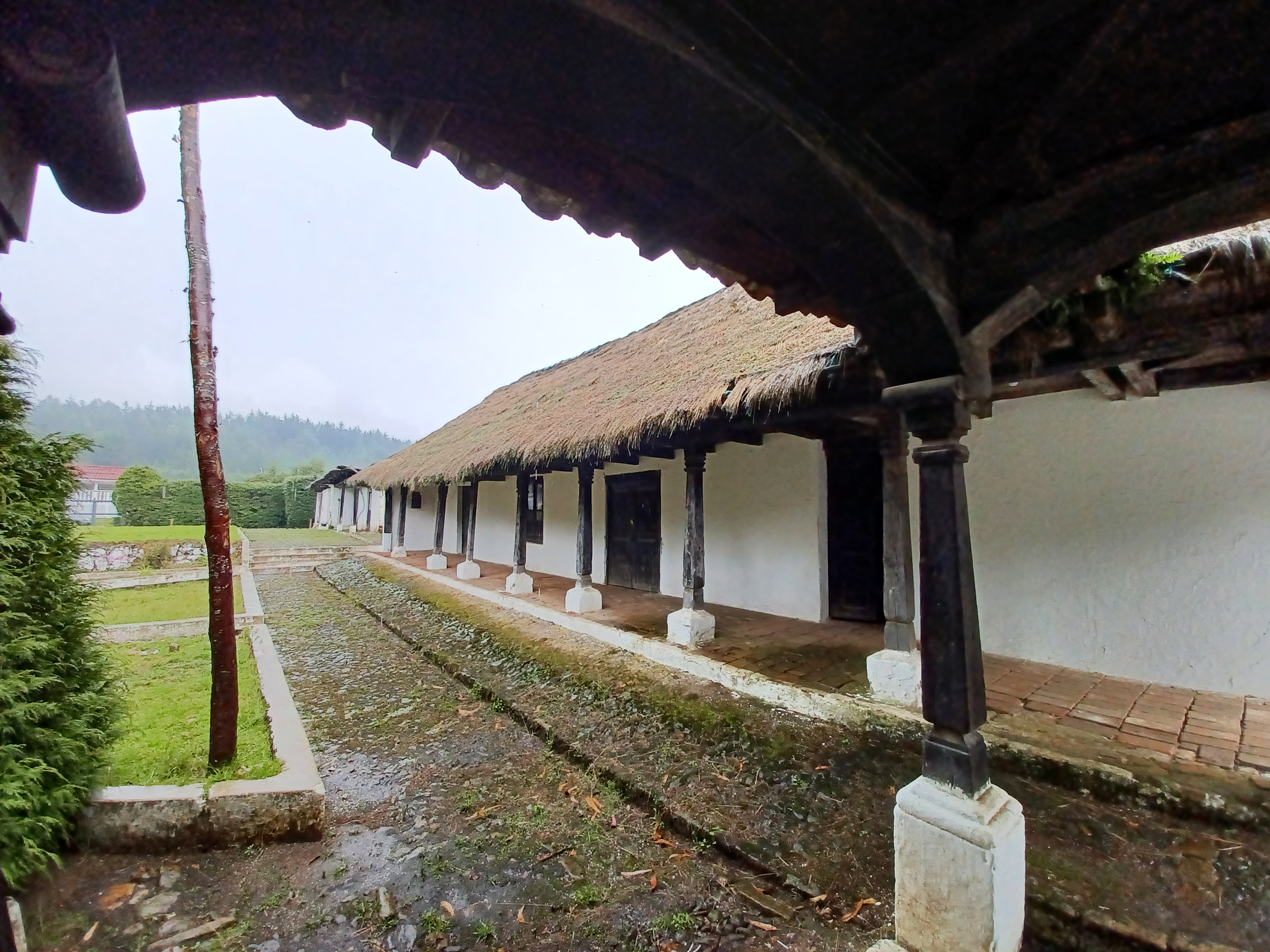
Barrios' house in San Lorenzo

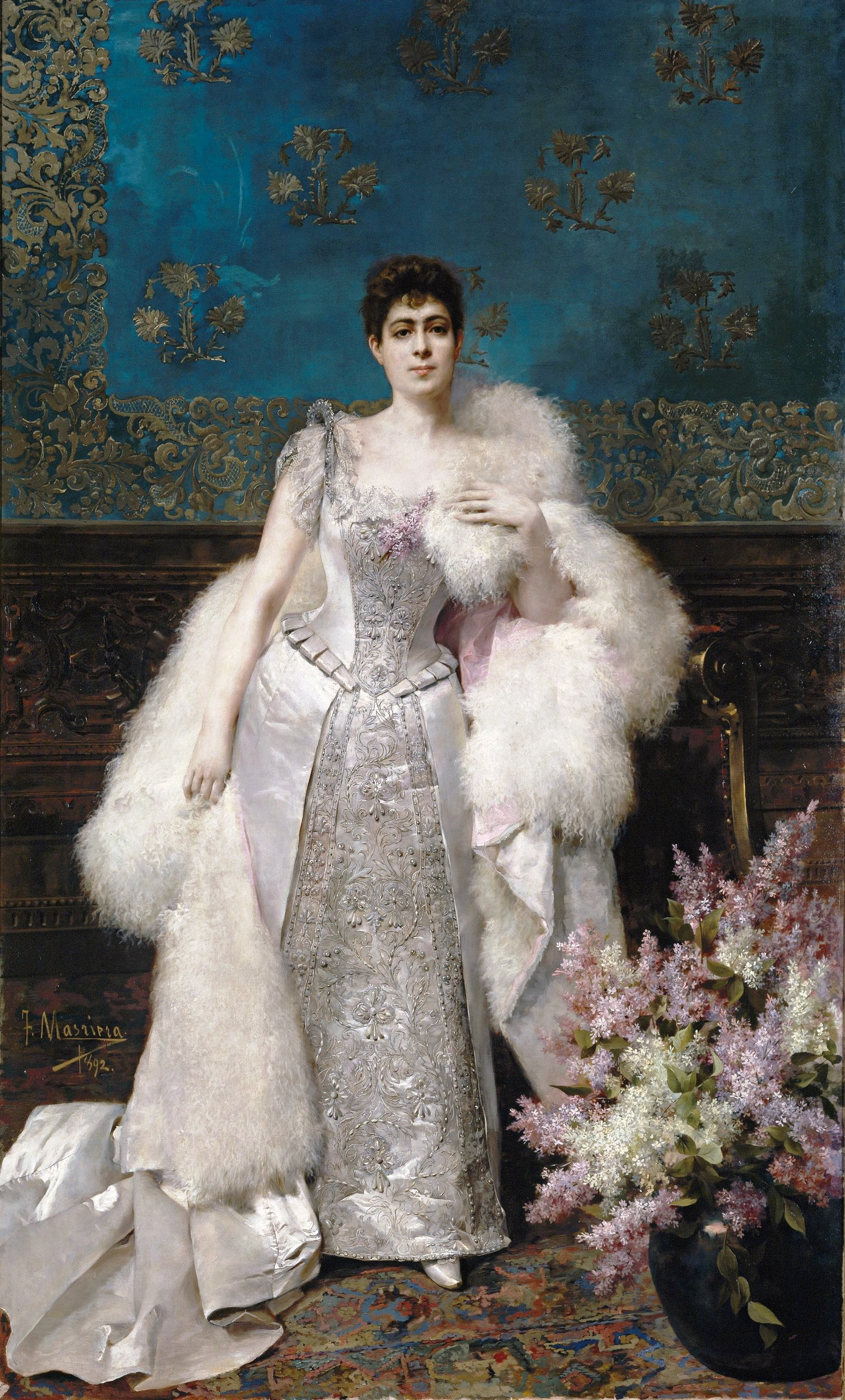
Francisca Aparicio y Auyón, 1892. Francisca was Barrios' wife. After his death, she left Guatemala for New York City, where she enjoyed the large inheritance her husband had left after his death.

Barrios was known from his youth for his intellect and energy, went to Guatemala City to study law, and became a lawyer in 1862.

== Rise to power ==
In 1867, revolt broke out in western Guatemala, which many residents wished to return to its former status of an independent state as Los Altos. Barrios joined with the rebels in Quetzaltenango, and soon proved himself a capable military leader, and in time gained the rank of general in the rebel army.

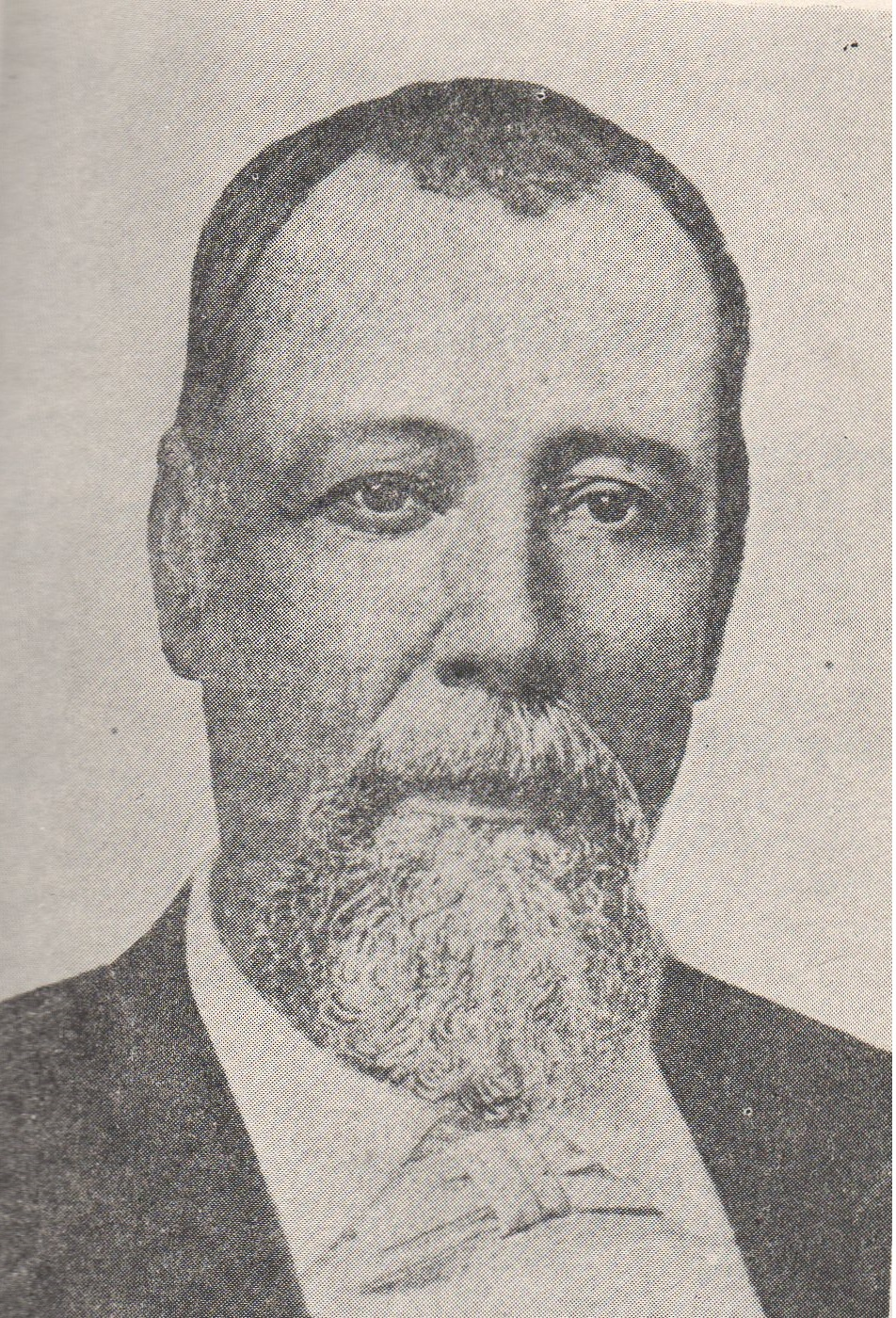
Barrios (Circa 1871)

In July 1871, Barrios, together with other generals and dissidents, issued the "Plan for the Fatherland" proposing to overthrow Guatemala's long entrenched Conservadora (conservative) administration; soon after, they succeeded in doing so, and General García Granados was declared president and Barrios commander of the armed forces. While Barrios was back in Quetzaltenago, García Granados was seen as weak by his own party members and was asked to call for elections, as the general consent was that Barrios would make a better president. Barrios was elected president in 1873.

== Government ==
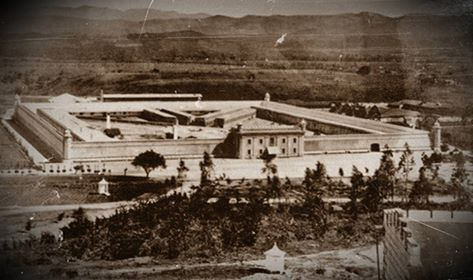
Guatemalan National Penitentiary, built by Barrios to incarcerate and torture his political enemies.

The Conservative government in Honduras gave military backing to a group of Guatemalan Conservatives wishing to take back the government, so Barrios declared war on the Honduran government. At the same time, Barrios, together with President Luis Bográn of Honduras, declared an intention to reunify the old United Provinces of Central America.

During his time in office, Barrios continued with the liberal reforms initiated by Miguel García Granados, but he was more aggressive in implementing them. A summary of his reforms is:

- Definitive separation between church and state: he expelled the regular clergy such as Morazán had done in 1829 and confiscated their properties.

Properties confiscated from the clergy by the Barrios regime
Regular order	Coat of arms	Clergy type	Confiscated properties
Order of Preachers		Regular	Monasteries; Large extensions of farm land; Sugar mills; Indian doctrines (Note: These were communities of native Guatemalans that worked for the farms and sugar mills of the friars.)
Mercedarians		Regular	Monasteries; Large extensions of farm land; Sugar mills; Indian doctrines
Society of Jesus		Regular	The Jesuits had been expelled from the Spanish colonies back in 1765 and did not return to Guatemala until 1852. By 1871, they did not have major possessions.
Recoletos		Regular	Monasterires
Conceptionists		Regular	Monasteries; Large extensions of farm land
Archdiocese of Guatemala		Secular	School and Trentin Seminar of Nuestra Señora de la Asunción
Congregation of the Oratory		Secular	Church building and housing in Guatemala City were obliterated by presidential order.

- Forbid mandatory tithing to weaken secular clergy members and the archbishop.
- Established civil marriage as the only official one in the country
- Secular cemeteries
- Civil records superseded religious ones
- Established secular education across the country
- Established free and mandatory elementary schools
- Closed the Pontifical University of San Carlos and in its place created the secular National University.

Barrios had a National Congress totally pledged to his will, and therefore was able to enact a new constitution in 1879, which allowed him to be reelected as president for another six-year term.

He also was intolerant with his political opponents, forcing many to flee the country and building the infamous Guatemalan Central penitentiary where he had numerous people incarcerated and tortured.

=== Guatemalan administrative structure during Barrios’ tenure ===
Appleton's guide for México and Guatemala from 1884, shows the twenty departments in which Guatemala was divided during Barrios' time in office:

Departament	Area (square miles)	Population	Capital	Capital population
Guatemala	700	100,000	Guatemala City	50,000
Sacatepéquez	250	48,000	Antigua Guatemala	15,000
Amatitlán	200	38,000	Amatitlán	14,000
Escuintla	1,950	30,000	Escuintla	10,000
Chimaltenango	800	60,000	Chimaltenango	6,300
Sololá	700	80,000	Sololá	15,000
Totonicapán	700	114,000	Totonicapan	25,000
Quiché	1,300	75,000	Santa Cruz del Quiché	6,300
Quezaltenango	450	94,000	Quezaltenango	22,000
Suchitepéquez	2,500	69,000	Mazatenango	11,500
Huehuetenango	4,550	90,000	Huehuetenango	16,000
San Márcos	750	100,000	San Márcos	12,600
Petén	13,200	14,000	Flores	2,200
Verapaz	11,200	100,000	Salamá	8,000
Izabal	1,500	3,400	Izabal	750
Chiquimula	2,200	70,000	Chiquimula	12,000
Zacapa	4,400	28,000	Zacapa	4,000
Jalapa	450	8,600	Jalapa	4,000
Jutiapa	1,700	38,000	Jutiapa	7,000
Santa Rosa	1,100	38,500	Cuajiniquilapa	5,000
Total	50,600	1,198,500		

Barrios oversaw substantial cleaning and reconstruction of Guatemala City, and set up a new accountable police force. He brought the first telegraph lines and railroads to the republic. He established a system of public schools in the country.

=== Economy ===
Decree #177
Day Laborer regulations
(NOTE: Only main sections are presented)

- Employer obligations: employers are mandated to keep record of all accounts, where they will keep the debits and credits of each day laborer, making it known to the laborer every week by an accounting booklet.
- A day laborer can be contracted upon employer's needs, but it cannot go beyond four years. However, a day laborer cannot leave the employer's farm land until he has paid in full any debts he or she might have incurred at the time.
- When a person wishes for his or her farm a batch of day laborers, he or she must request it from the Political Chief of the Department he or she lives in, whose authority will designate which native town must provide such batch. In any case can be larger than 60 day laborers.

— From: Martínez Peláez, S. La Patria del Criollo, interpretation essay of Guatemala Colonial reality México. 1990

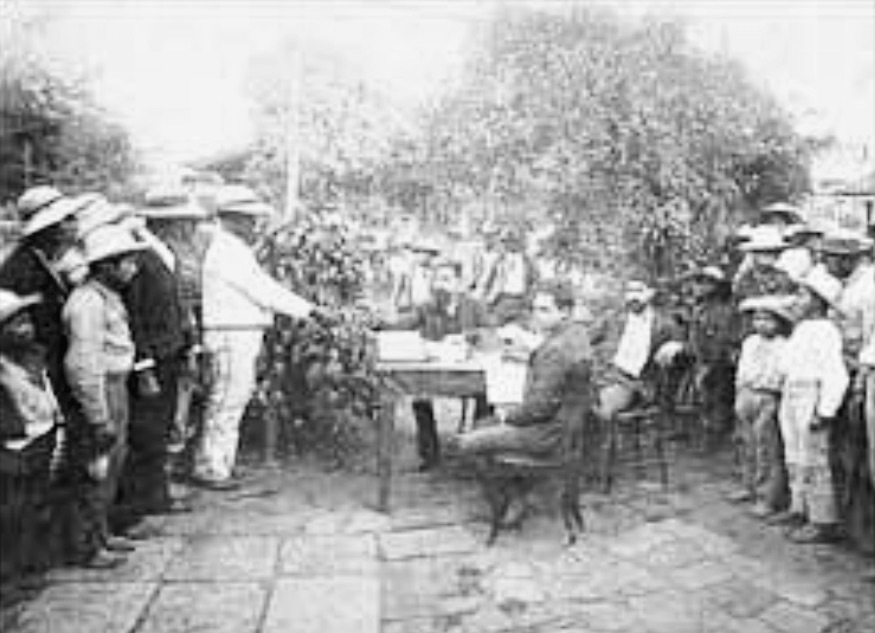
Day laborers pay day in Santa Rosa ca. 1890 according to the Day Laborer Regulations established by Barrios.

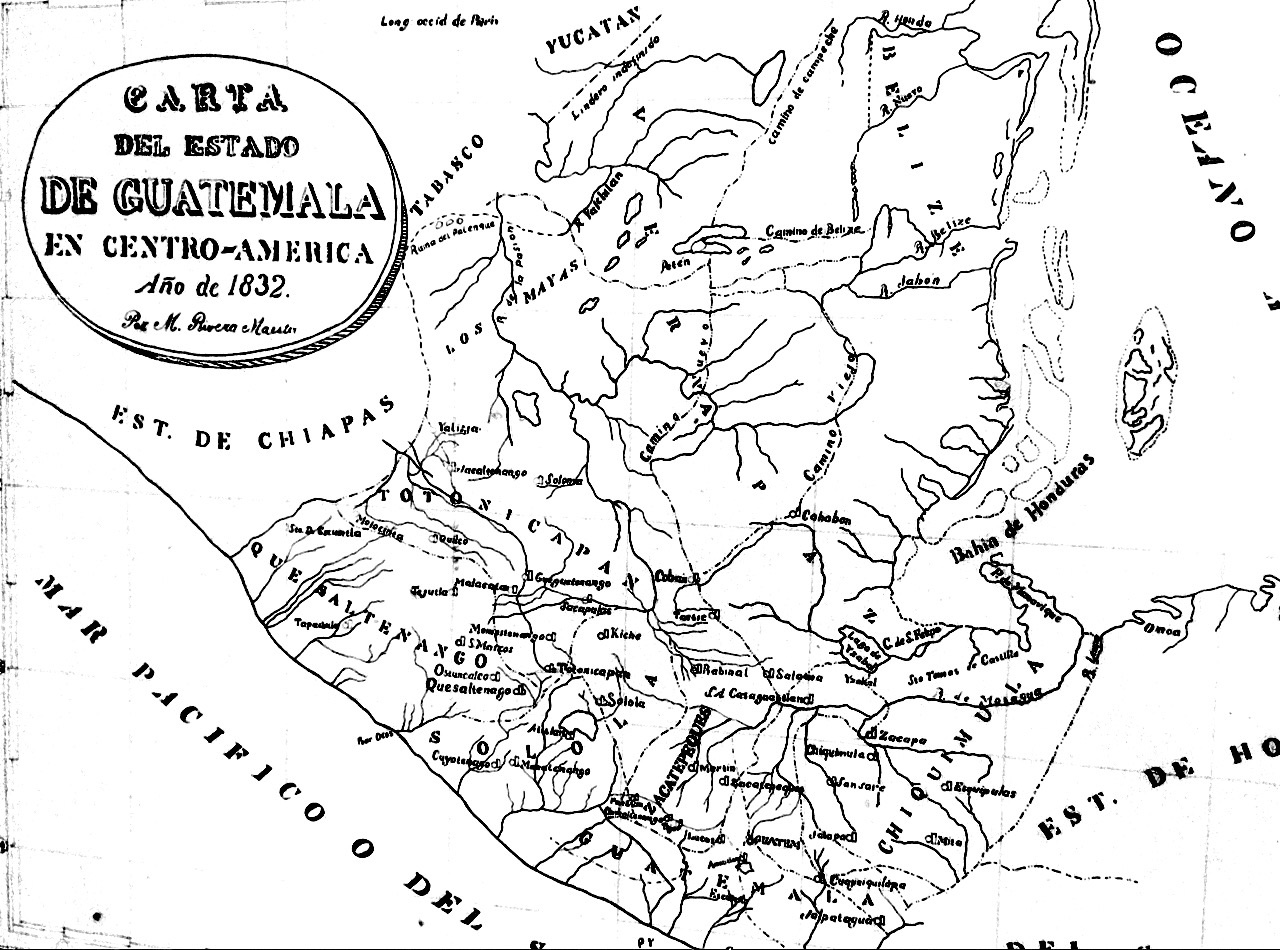
Guatemala territory during Rafael Carrera and Vicente Cerna conservative regimes. Soconusco territories were given to México in exchange for their support for the Liberal revolution in 1871 by Herrera-Mariscal treaty of 1882.

During Barrios' tenure, the "Indian land" that the conservative regime of Rafael Carrera had so strongly defended was confiscated and distributed among those officers who had helped him during the Liberal Revolution in 1871. Decree # 170 (a.k.a. Census redemption decree) made it easy to confiscate those lands in favor of the army officers and the German settlers in Verapaz, as it allowed to publicly sell those common Indian lots. Therefore, the fundamental characteristic of the productive system during Barrios' regime was the accumulation of large swaths of land among few owners and a sort of "farmland servitude," based on the exploitation of the native day laborers.

In order to ensure a steady supply of day laborers for the coffee plantations, which required many, Barrios' government decreed the Day Laborer regulations, labor legislation that placed the entire native population at the disposition of the new and traditional Guatemalan landlords, except the regular clergy, who were eventually expelled form the country and saw their properties confiscated. This decree set the following for the native Guatemalans:

1. forced by law to work on farms when the owners of the farms required them, without regard for where the native towns were located.
2. under control of local authorities, who were charged with ensuring that day laborers were sent to all the farms that required them.
3. subject to "habilitation:" a type of forced advanced pay, which buried the day laborer in debt and then made it legal for the landlords to keep them on their land for as long as they wanted.
4. Created the day laborer booklet: a document that proved that a day laborer had no debts to his employer. Without this document, any day laborer was at the mercy of the local authorities and the landlords.

=== Second term ===
In 1879, a constitution was ratified for Guatemala. This was the Republic's first as an independent nation, as the old Conservador regime had ruled by decree. In 1880, Barrios was reelected President for a six-year term. Barrios unsuccessfully attempted to get the United States of America to mediate the disputed boundary between Guatemala and Mexico.

== Central American Union ==
Barrios was an advocate for unifying the territories of Central America into a single state. The legitimation and consolidation of Barrios as a charismatic military and political leader was such that on February 28, 1885, Barrios declared himself President of Central America and sought support for the plan by the United States.

Guatemala, El Salvador, and Honduras agreed to re-form the Central American Union, but the then Salvadoran President Rafael Zaldívar decided to withdraw, and sent envoys to Mexico to join in an alliance to overthrow Barrios. Mexican President Porfirio Díaz feared Barrios' liberal reforms and the potential of a strong Central America as a neighbor if Barrios' plans bore fruit. Díaz sent Mexican troops to seize the disputed land of Soconusco.

== Death ==
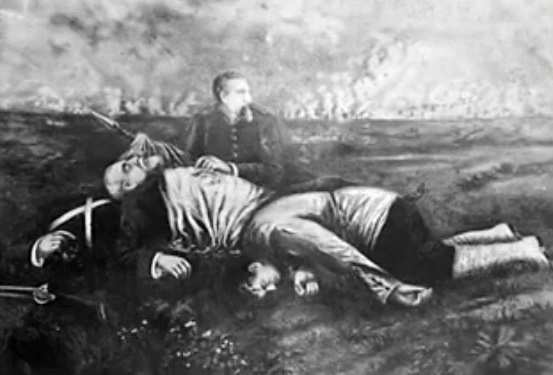
Painting of General Barrios' death in Chalchuapa on April 2, 1885.

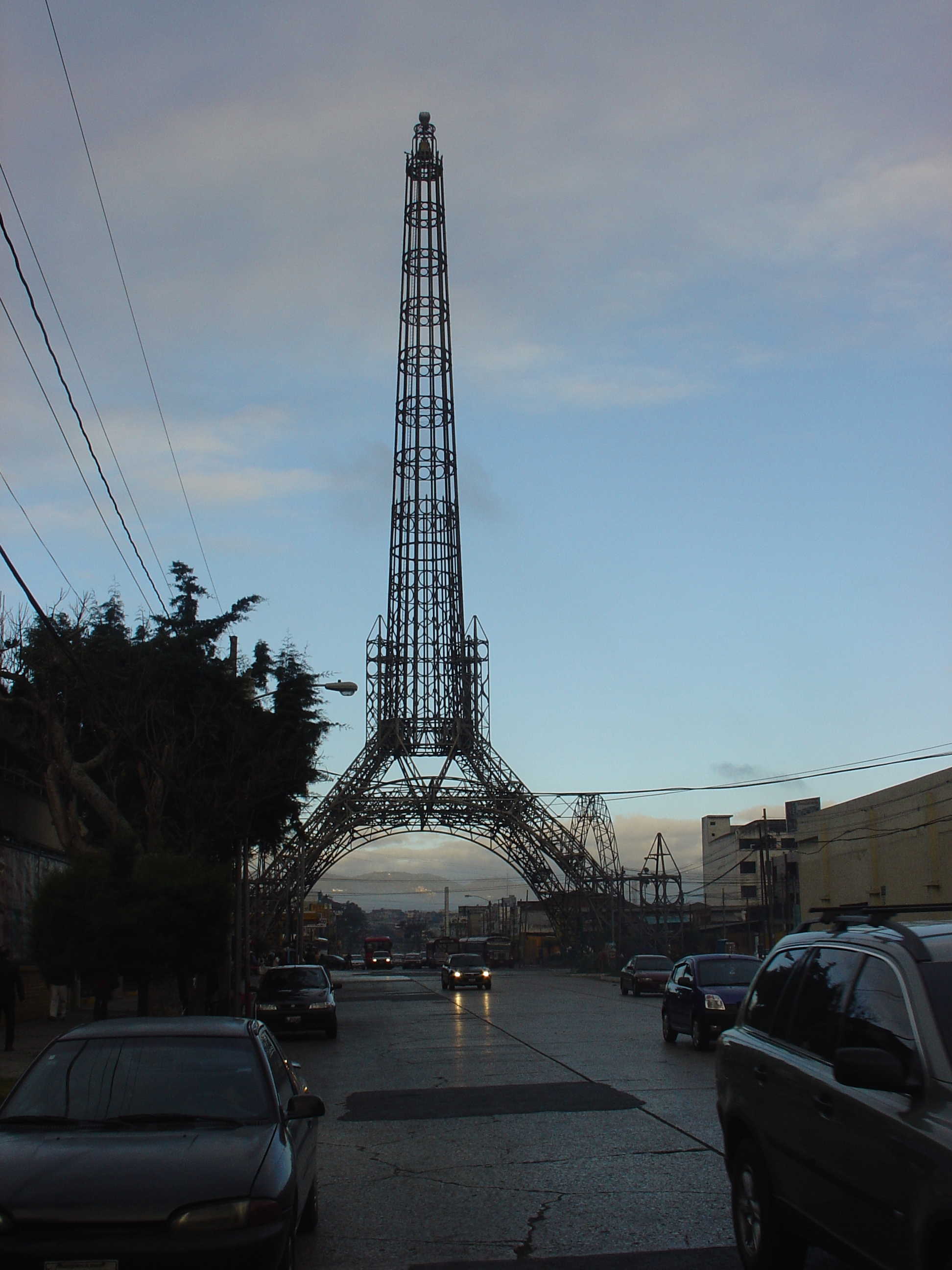
Reformador Tower, inaugurated on July 19, 1935, by the liberal regime of general Jorge Ubico Castañeda in celebration of Barrios Centennial.

Justo Rufino Barrios died during the Battle of Chalchuapa in El Salvador, as did his son, General Venancio Barrios, on 2 April 1885. The official liberal version is that Barrios was killed in action, alongside officer Adolfo V. Hall. However, some versions insist that one of his soldiers shot and killed unintentionally from behind or that there might have been a murder plot.

Upon learning about his death, the Guatemalan Army panicked; officer José María Reyna Barrios, president Barrios' nephew, picked up the lifeless body of Venancio Barrios and organized the withdrawal of the Guatemalan battalions, while preparing the defense against a possible Salvadorian attack. Reyna Barrios, signing as Rosario Yerjabens, (Note: Rosario Yerjabens was an anagram of Reyna Barrios name.) told the story of what he saw, which does not match the official account: "The general in Chief, Justo Rufino Barrios, decided, about 8 a.m., to personally command the attack on the northeast side of "Casa Blanca"; and in order to accomplish that, he sent the Jirón Brigade, whose soldiers were all Jalapas. (Note: Jalapas: soldiers from the Guatemalan city of Jalapa.) These soldiers behaved in the most cowardly and disgraceful way. It is believed that they had been indoctrinated by some miserable traitor, one of those men without heart or conscience, one of those ungrateful people that was licking their benefactor's hand and abusing both his good heart and fortune. Unfortunately, a moment after the attack began, an enemy bullet wounded him mortally and he had to be taken off the battlefield. This sad occurrence was enough for some coward Jalapa soldiers who saw general Barrios dead, to leave their post and spread the sad news."

On 4 April the defeated Guatemalan forces arrived in Guatemala City, where Reyna Barrios was promoted to general for his valiant battle services.

General Barrios tomb in Guatemala City in 2014
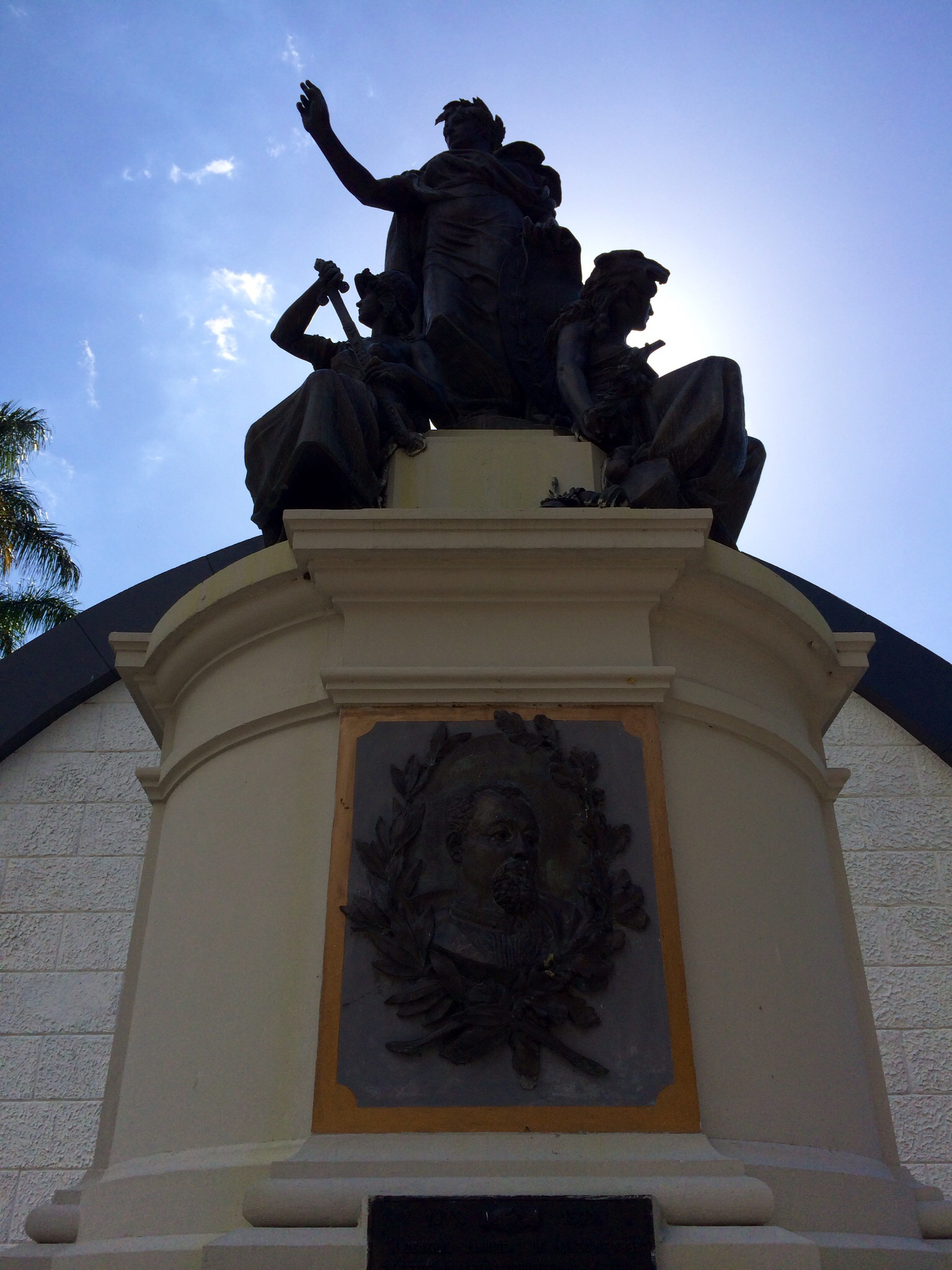
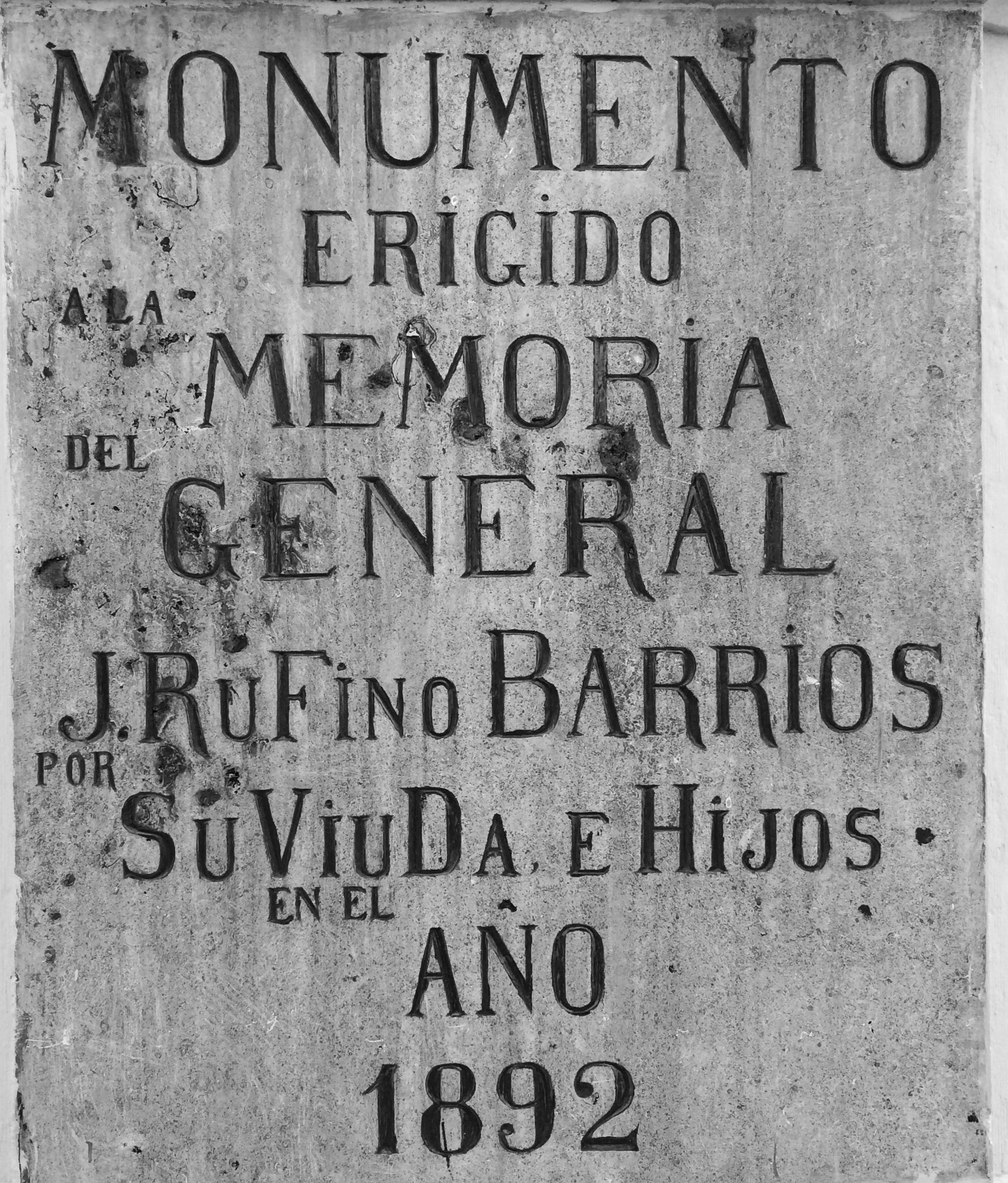
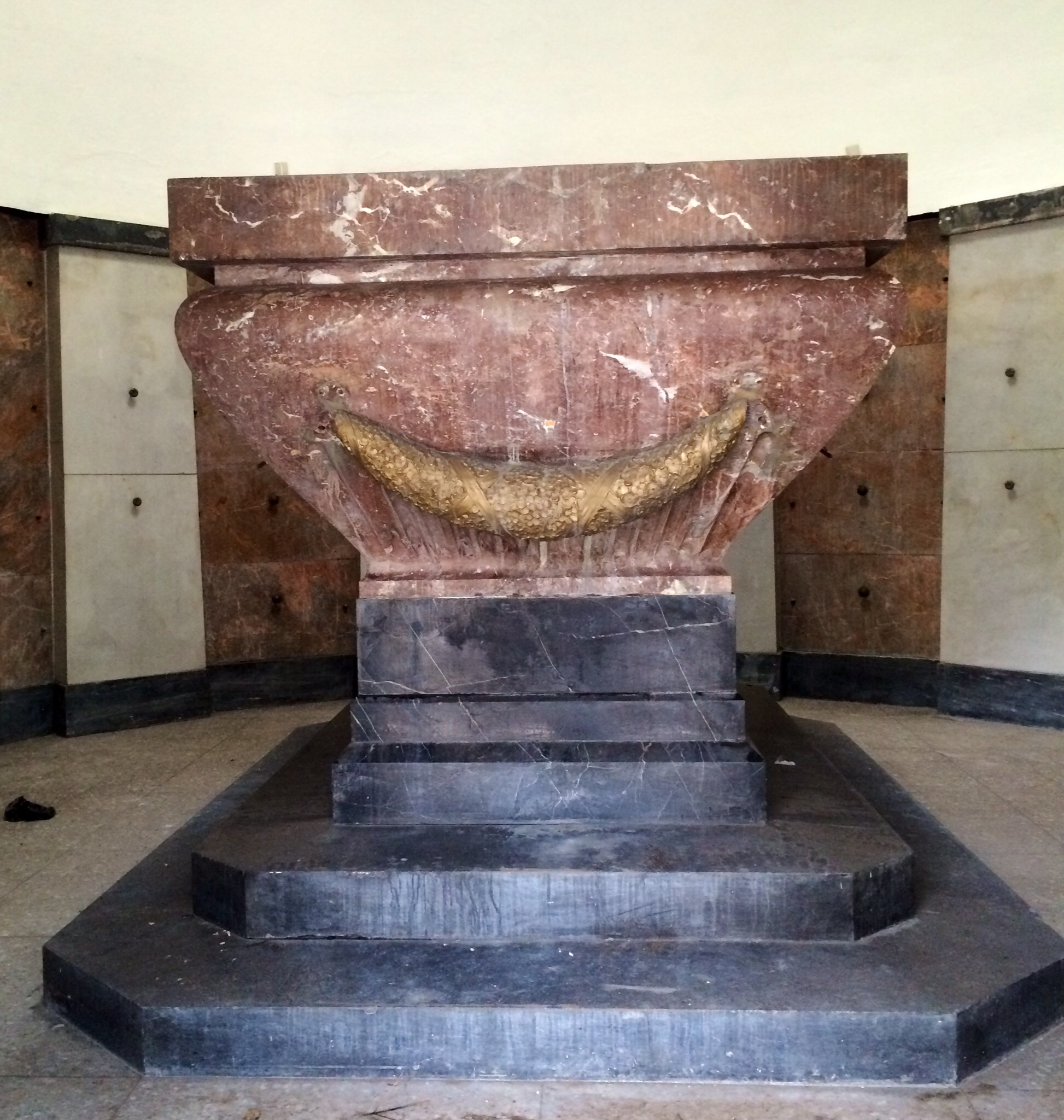

Today, his portrait is on the five quetzal bill in Guatemala, and the city and port of Puerto Barrios, capital of Izabal, bears his name.

== See also ==
- Avenida Reforma
- History of Central America
- History of Guatemala
- Presidents of Guatemala
- Torre del Reformador

== Notes ==
Political offices
Preceded by Miguel García Granados	President of Guatemala; 1873–1885	Succeeded by Alejandro M. Sinibaldi (acting)
