= Felipe Cruz =

Brazilian footballer

Personal information
- Full name: Felipe Ferreira da Cruz
- Date of birth: 23 April 2000 (age 26)
- Place of birth: Ferros, Brazil
- Height: 1.85 m (6 ft 1 in)
- Position: Forward

Team information
- Current team: Maranhão (on loan from Primavera-SP)

Youth career
- –2017: Sampaio Corrêa
- 2018: Imperatriz
- 2018–2019: Oeste
- 2019: Ferroviário

Senior career*
Years	Team	Apps	(Gls)
2018–2019	Oeste	6	(0)
2020	Imperatriz	5	(0)
2020–2021	Moto Club	26	(9)
2021–	Primavera-SP	41	(2)
2021	→ Tuntum (loan)	6	(0)
2023	→ Tombense (loan)	5	(0)
2023	→ Anapolina (loan)	3	(0)
2024	→ Avenida (loan)	9	(0)
2024	→ Maranhão (loan)	21	(8)
2025	→ Ferroviário (loan)	14	(2)
2025–2026	→ Marcílio Dias (loan)	12	(2)
2026–	→ Maranhão (loan)	19	(4)
- * Club domestic league appearances and goals as of 10 November 2026

Felipe Ferreira da Cruz (born 23 April 2000), commonly known as Felipe Cruz, is a Brazililian footballer who plays as a forward for Maranhão, on loan from Primavera-SP.

== Career statistics ==
=== Club ===
As of 10 July 2019.

Club	Season	League			Cup		Continental		Other		Total	
Club	Season	Division	Apps	Goals	Apps	Goals	Apps	Goals	Apps	Goals	Apps	Goals
Oeste	2018	Série B	6	0	0	0	–		0	0	6	0
Career total			6	0	0	0	0	0	0	0	6	0

== Honours ==
Tuntum

- Copa FMF: 2021
