= List of wars involving El Salvador =

This is a list of wars involving the Republic of El Salvador.

== 1800s ==
Key
Salvadoran victory
Salvadoran defeat
Ceasefire or other result

Conflict	Allies	Opponents	Results
1811 Independence Movement (1811)	Salvadoran revolutionaries	(Spain) Spanish Empire	Revolt suppressed
1814 Independence Movement (1814)	Salvadoran rebels	Spanish Empire	Defeat
Mexican annexation of El Salvador (1822–1823)	El Salvador	Mexico; Guatemala	Initial defeat, subsequent victory
First Central American Civil War (1826–1829)	Protective Allied Army of the Law; Honduras; El Salvador	Federal Government; Guatemala	Protective Allied Army of the Law victory: Manuel José Arce deposed; Francisco Morazán elected president
Salvadoran campaign of 1832 (1832)	El Salvador	Federal Republic of Central America: Guatemala; Honduras; Nicaragua	Federal victory: José María Cornejo is overthrown; Federal rule in El Salvador is restored
Anastasio Aquino's rebellion (1833)	Federal Republic of Central America: El Salvador	Indigenous rebels	Rebellion suppressed
Second Central American Civil War (1838–1840)	Unionists: Federal Republic of Central America; El Salvador	Separatists: Guatemala; Nicaragua; Honduras	Separatist victory: Dissolution of the Federal Republic of Central America
Malespín's War (1844–1845)	El Salvador; Selva's Nicaragua; Honduras	Nicaragua; Central American Unionists	Allied victory: Peace Treaty signed between Francisco Malespín and José León Sandoval
Honduran–Salvadoran War (1845)	El Salvador	Honduras	Status Quo Ante Bellum
Filibuster War (1855–1857)	Allied Central American Army; Nicaragua; Costa Rica; El Salvador; Guatemala; Honduras; Legitimist Party	Filibusters; Walker's Nicaragua; Democratic Party	Central American alliance victory
War of 1863 (1863)	El Salvador; Honduras	Guatemala; Salvadoran exiles; Supported by: Costa Rica; Nicaragua	Guatemalan victory: Overthrow of Gerardo Barrios
Honduran–Salvadoran War (1871)	El Salvador (Honduras) Honduran rebels	Honduras (El Salvador) Salvadoran rebels	Honduran victory: Francisco Dueñas overthrown; Santiago González becomes president
First Honduran intervention (1872)	El Salvador; Guatemala (Honduras) Honduran rebels	Honduras	Allied victory
Second Honduran intervention (1873)	El Salvador; Guatemala; Honduran rebels	Honduras	Victory
Guatemalan–Salvadoran War (1876)	El Salvador	Guatemala	Guatemalan victory: Overthrow of Andrés del Valle and Santiago González
Barrios' War of Reunification (1885)	El Salvador; Mexico; Costa Rica; Nicaragua	Guatemala; Honduras	Anti-Barrios victory: Failure to reunify Central America; Death of Justo Rufino Barrios
Menéndez's revolution (1885)	Salvadoran government; Nicaragua	Anti-government rebels; Guatemala	Rebel victory: Rafael Zaldívar and Fernando Figueroa overthrown; Francisco Menéndez becomes provisional president
First Totoposte War (1890)	El Salvador	Guatemala; Salvadoran exiles	Status quo ante bellum
Revolution of the 44 (1894)	Salvadoran government	Anti-government rebels; Supported by: Guatemala; Honduras	Rebel victory: Carlos and Antonio Ezeta overthrown; Rafael Antonio Gutiérrez becomes provisional president

== 1900s ==
Key
Salvadoran victory
Salvadoran defeat
Ceasefire or other result

Conflict	Allies	Opponents	Results
Second Totoposte War (1903)	El Salvador; Mexico; Guatemalan exiles	Guatemala	Status quo ante bellum
Third Totoposte War (1906)	El Salvador; Mexico; Guatemalan exiles	Guatemala	Status quo ante bellum
War of 1907 (1907)	El Salvador	Nicaragua; Salvadoran exiles; American filibusters; Honduras	Salvadoran military victory: Status quo ante bellum
La Matanza (1932)	Salvadoran government; Armed Forces; National Guard; National Police	Peasant rebels; Communist Party of El Salvador; Pipil rebels	Revolt suppressed: Ethnocide of Pipil people
World War II (1941–1945)	Allies: United States; Soviet Union; United Kingdom; China; France; Poland; Canada; Australia; New Zealand; India; South Africa; Philippines; Yugoslavia; Greece; Iran; Egypt; Ethiopia; Liberia; Denmark; Norway; Netherlands; Belgium; Luxembourg; Czechoslovakia; Turkey; Saudi Arabia; Brazil; Mexico; Chile; Panama; Costa Rica; El Salvador; Guatemala; Honduras; Nicaragua; Dominican Republic; Haiti; Cuba; Argentina; Colombia; Bolivia; Ecuador; Paraguay; Peru; Uruguay; Venezuela	Axis: Germany; Japan; Italy; Hungary; Romania; Bulgaria; Croatia; Slovakia; Finland; Thailand; Manchukuo; Mengjiang	Allies: Collapse of Nazi Germany; Fall of Japanese and Italian Empires; Creation of the United Nations; Emergence of the United States and the Soviet Union as superpowers; Beginning of the Cold War
Dominican Civil War (1965)	Loyalist faction United States IAPF: Brazil; Paraguay; Nicaragua; Costa Rica; El Salvador; Honduras	Constitutionalist faction: Dominican Revolutionary Party; Social Christian Revolutionary Party; June 14th Revolutionary Movement	Loyalist victory: Ceasefire declared; Formation of the provisional government for new elections; Deposition of Juan Bosch of the presidency ratified; Organization of presidential elections in 1966 under international supervision; Election of Joaquín Balaguer as the new president; Establishment of the Fourth Dominican Republic on July 1, 1966
Football War (1969)	El Salvador	Honduras	Ceasefire by OAS intervention: Status quo ante bellum
Salvadoran Civil War (1979–1992)	Salvadoran government (Revolutionary Government Junta until 1982); Paramilitary death squads; Foreign mercenaries (unknown number, possibly hundreds); Supported by: United States	FMLN (CRM, FDR); FPL (BPR); ERP (LP-28); RN (FARN, FAPU); PRTC (MLP); PCES (UDN); Supported by: Soviet Union; Cuba; (Derg) Ethiopia; Nicaragua	Chapultepec Peace Accords: Armed Forces of El Salvador restructured; National Police replaced by the National Civil Police; National Guard and Treasury Police dissolved; FMLN armed wing dissolved, becoming solely a political party

== 2000s ==
Salvadoran victory
Salvadoran defeat
Ceasefire or other result
Ongoing conflict

Conflict	Allies	Opponents	Results
Iraq War (2003–2009)	Invasion (2003); Coalition of the willing: United States; United Kingdom; Australia; Poland; Kurdistan Region: KDP; PUK; Iraqi National Congress: Free Iraqi Forces; After invasion (2003–11); Iraq; United States; United Kingdom; MNF–I (2003–09): El Salvador; Kurdistan Region; Awakening Council	Invasion (2003) (Ba'athist Iraq) Republic of Iraq: MEK; After invasion (2003–11); Al-Qaeda in Iraq; Islamic Army in Iraq; Islamic State of Iraq; Mahdi Army (Ba'athist Iraq) Naqshbandi Army; Hamas of Iraq; Jaysh al-Mujahideen; 1920 Revolution Brigades; Jamaat Ansar al-Sunna	Victory: Invasion and occupation of Iraq; Defeat of Ba'ath Party government and execution of Saddam Hussein; Iraqi insurgency, emergence of al-Qaeda in Iraq, and civil war; Subsequent depletion of Iraqi insurgency, improvements in public security; Establishment of democratic elections and formation of new Shia led government; U.S.–Iraq Status of Forces Agreement; Withdrawal of U.S. forces from Iraq; See § Aftermath
Afghanistan War (2011–2014)	Afghanistan; United States; United Kingdom; Canada; Australia; New Zealand; Germany; Italy; France; Denmark; Georgia; Poland; Romania; Turkey; Bulgaria; Romania; Spain; El Salvador; ISAF: Albania; Armenia; Austria; Azerbaijan; Bahrain; Belgium; Bosnia and Herzegovina; Bulgaria; Croatia; Czech Republic; Denmark; El Salvador; Estonia; Finland; Greece; Hungary; Iceland; Ireland; Jordan; Latvia; Lithuania; Luxembourg; Malaysia; Mongolia; Montenegro; Netherlands; New Zealand; Norway; Portugal; Republic of Macedonia; Singapore; Slovakia; Slovenia; South Korea; Spain; Sweden; Switzerland; Tonga; Ukraine; United Arab Emirates; Northern Alliance	Taliban; al-Qaeda; Islamic Movement of Uzbekistan; Hezb-e-Islami Gulbuddin; Hezb-e Islami Khalis; Haqqani network; Lashkar-e-Taiba; Jaish-e-Mohammed; East Turkestan Islamic Movement; Tehrik-i-Taliban Pakistan; Islamic Emirate of Waziristan; Tehreek-e-Nafaz-e-Shariat-e-Mohammadi; Islamic Jihad Union	Defeat: American victory in the 2001 United States invasion of Afghanistan leading to the destruction of al-Qaeda and Taliban militant training camps and fall of the Taliban government (2001); Establishment of the Islamic Republic of Afghanistan; Start of Taliban insurgency; Osama bin Laden killed by DEVGRU operators in Abbottabad, Pakistan in May 2011; "Afghanization" of Afghan conflict. Withdrawal of most US troops after 2014; End of Operation Enduring Freedom; start of 2015 phase of war, and Operation Freedom's Sentinel. End of US and ISAF led combat mission; beginning of NATO-led training and assistance mission.; Doha Agreement and progressive withdrawal of remaining US troops after 2020; Renewed Taliban offensive in 2021; Taliban forces capture Kabul on August 15, 2021, and overthrow the U.S.-backed Islamic Republic of Afghanistan; Re-establishment of the Taliban-run Islamic Emirate of Afghanistan; Panjshir Province held out against the Taliban for 3 weeks after Kabul was conquered but ended up also being conquered by the Taliban; On 30 August 2021 the last American military plane departed Afghanistan.; Billions of dollars of foreign-origin military hardware that was formerly in custody of the Islamic Republic of Afghanistan seized by Taliban
Salvadoran gang crackdown (2022–present)	Salvadoran government: Armed Forces; National Civil Police	Criminal gangs: Mara Salvatrucha; 18th Street gang; Other gangs	Ongoing
Haitian conflict (2025–present)	Haitian government: Armed Forces of Haiti; Haitian National Police; MSSMH/GSF: Belize; Bahamas; Chad; El Salvador; Guatemala; Jamaica; Kenya; Mongolia; Sri Lanka	Viv Ansanm: G9; G-Pèp; Chen Mechan; Kraze Baryè; 5 Segond; Gran Ravine; Other groups	Ongoing: Involvement escalated into a Salvadoran military intervention on 21 October 2026 following the kidnapping of four Salvadoran technicians by Haitian gang members.
Operation Southern Spear (2025–present)	Shield of the Americas; United States; Argentina; Dominican Republic; Ecuador; Trinidad and Tobago; El Salvador; Colombia; Venezuelan opposition; United Kingdom	Venezuela; Cuba; Supported by: Russia	Ongoing: Capture of Nicolás Maduro
