= List of Salvadoran coup d'états =

List of coup d'états in El Salvador

This article lists successful and failed coup d'états that have taken place in El Salvador since 1821:

== 1840s ==
- 1846 Salvadoran coup attempt – President Eugenio Aguilar was overthrown by Bishop Jorge de Viteri y Ungo and Senator Fermín Palacios for 10 days before Aguilar led a counter-coup and regained power.

== 1880s ==
- 1885 Salvadoran coup d'état – President Rafael Zaldívar was overthrown by General Francisco Menéndez on 22 June 1885.

== 1890s ==
- 1890 Salvadoran coup d'état – President Francisco Menéndez was overthrown by General Carlos Ezeta on 22 June 1890.
- 1894 Salvadoran coup d'état – President Carlos Ezeta was overthrown by 44 rebel leaders on 9 June 1894. The rebels appointed Rafael Antonio Gutiérrez as President.
- 1898 Salvadoran coup d'état – President Rafael Antonio Gutiérrez was overthrown by General Tomás Regalado on 13 November 1898. The coup lead to the dissolution of the Greater Republic of Central America

== 1920s ==
- 1927 Salvadoran coup attempt – Former presidents Jorge Meléndez and Alfonso Quiñónez Molina attempted to overthrow President Pío Romero Bosque and preserve the Meléndez–Quiñónez dynasty, but the coup failed and both were exiled from the country.

== 1930s ==
- 1931 Salvadoran coup d'état – President Arturo Araujo was overthrown by the Salvadoran Army on 2 December 1931. The Civic Directory was established and appointed Vice President Maximiliano Hernández Martínez as the country's Acting President on 4 December.

== 1940s ==
- April 1944 Salvadoran coup attempt – Pro-Axis elements of the Salvadoran Army garrisoned in San Salvador attempted to overthrow President Maximiliano Hernández Martínez on 2 April 1944.
- May 1944 Salvadoran coup d'état – Civilians protested in the streets of San Salvador against Maximiliano Hernández Martínez's government and forced him to resign on 9 May 1944.
- October 1944 Salvadoran coup d'état – Provisional President Andrés Ignacio Menéndez was overthrown by General Osmín Aguirre y Salinas on 21 October 1944.
- 1948 Salvadoran coup d'état – President Salvador Castaneda Castro was overthrown by the Salvadoran Army on 14 December 1948. The Revolutionary Council of Government was established and elected Major Óscar Osorio as President on 14 September 1950.

== 1960s ==
- 1960 Salvadoran coup d'état – President José María Lemus was overthrown by the Salvadoran Army on 26 October 1960. The Junta of Government was established in the aftermath.
- 1961 Salvadoran coup d'état – The Junta of Government was overthrown by the Salvadoran Army on 25 January 1961. The Civic-Military Directory was established and appointed Eusebio Rodolfo Cordón Cea as Provisional President on 25 January 1962.

== 1970s ==
- 1972 Salvadoran coup attempt – The Military Youth attempted to overthrow Fidel Sánchez Hernández, prevent the presidency of Arturo Armando Molina, and install José Napoleón Duarte as President.
- 1979 Salvadoran coup d'état – President Carlos Humberto Romero was overthrown by the Salvadoran Army on 15 October 1979. The Revolutionary Government Junta of El Salvador was established and elected Álvaro Magaña as President on 2 May 1982. The coup started the 12-year long Salvadoran Civil War.

== See also ==
- History of El Salvador
