= Menéndez's revolution =

Overthrow of presidents Rafael Zaldívar and Fernando Figueroa

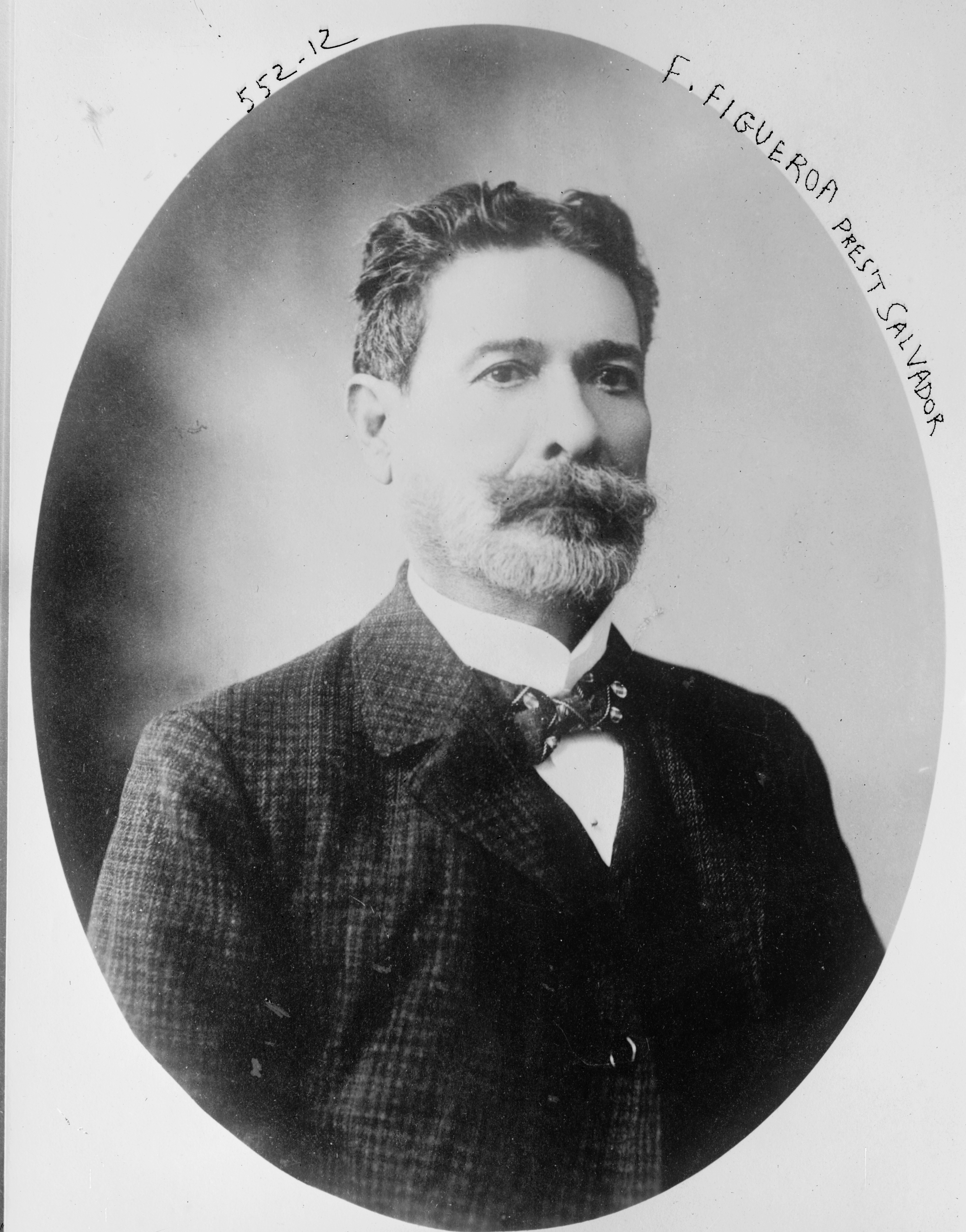
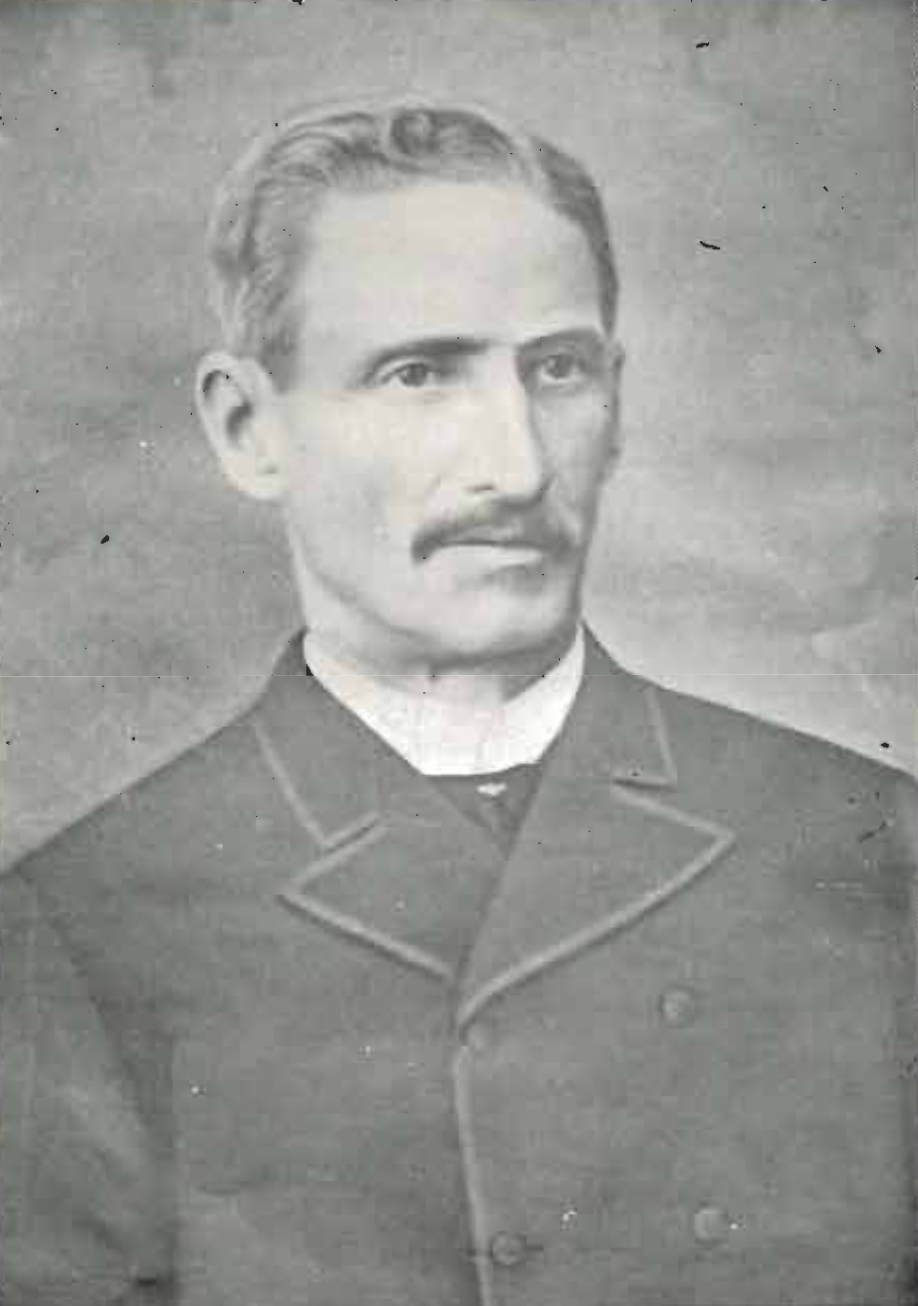
- Government leader Fernando Figueroa (left) and revolutionary leader Francisco Menéndez (right)
Date	10 May – 22 June 1885 (1 month, 1 week and 5 days)
Location	El Salvador
Result	Idealist liberal victory; Presidents Rafael Zaldívar and Fernando Figueroa overthrown; Francisco Menéndez becomes President of El Salvador

Belligerents
Salvadoran government; Pragmatic liberals; Nicaragua	Salvadoran rebels; Idealist liberals; Guatemala

Commanders and leaders
Rafael Zaldívar; Fernando Figueroa; José Rosales; Miguel Brioso (surrendered); Adán Mora (surrendered); Indalecio Miranda; Narcio Talavera	Francisco Menéndez; José María Rivas; Estanislao Pérez; Rafael Gutiérrez

Menéndez's revolution (Spanish: revolución de Menéndez) or the Revolution of 1885 (revolución de 1885) was a military rebellion led by Divisional General Francisco Menéndez against Salvadoran president Rafael Zaldívar and later Divisional General Fernando Figueroa from 10 May to 22 June 1885. The revolution was fought between pragmatic liberals supporting the Salvadoran government and idealist liberals supporting the rebels.

After the fall of Francisco Dueñas' conservative government in 1871, El Salvador came under the control of liberal governments. Although the idealist and pragmatic liberals held similar policy positions, they openly opposed each other and fought for control of the government. Zaldívar, a pragmatic liberal, rose to power in 1876 after the overthrow of idealist liberals Andrés del Valle and Marshal Santiago González. Menéndez, an idealist liberal, opposed Zaldívar and lived in exile in Guatemala after a failed coup against Zaldívar in 1883.

On 10 May 1885, Menéndez invaded El Salvador from Guatemala. This, coupled with an indigenous insurrection by General José María Rivas in Cojutepeque on 14 May led to Zaldívar's resignation and flight from the country. Zaldívar handed the presidency to Figueroa, another pragmatic liberal. Figueroa attempted to suppress Menéndez's revolution, but following a series of military defeats to the revolutionaries, Figueroa resigned and fled the country himself on 18 June. Menéndez and José Rosales, Figueroa's successor, signed the Treaty of San Andrés on 19 June. Menéndez became President of El Salvador when he marched the victorious Liberation Army into San Salvador on 22 June. He ruled the country until he was overthrown by pragmatic reformist General Carlos Ezeta in 1890.

== Background ==
After the overthrow of President Francisco Dueñas' conservative government in 1871, El Salvador was ruled by a series of liberal governments until 1927. Although the liberals were continuously in power, there were two rival factions: the idealist liberals and the pragmatic liberals. Both factions agreed on many policies, including the construction of railroads and ports, the promotion of the cultivation of coffee as a cash crop, the repression of discontent peasants, and the elimination of communal land. Despite their policies being virtually identical, both factions vocally opposed each other as the idealists further supported freedom of speech and holding fair elections (although the idealists were never able to implement either when in power). The idealists also supported reunifying Central America.

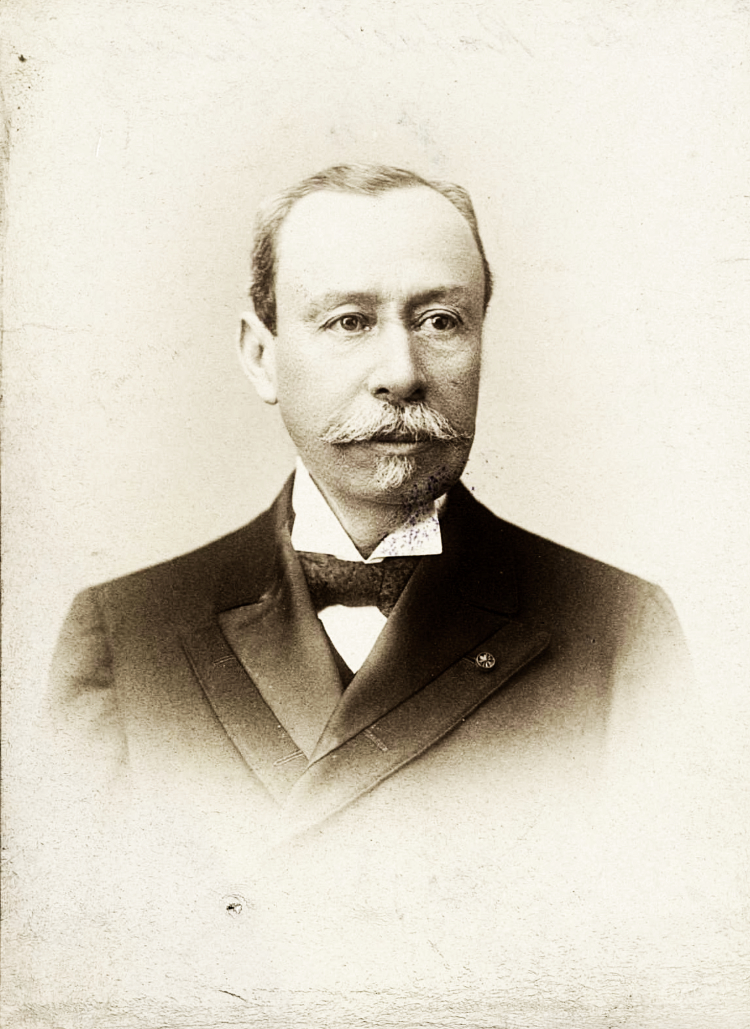
Pragmatic liberal president Rafael Zaldívar, who resigned four days into the revolution

The idealist liberals ruled El Salvador from 1871 to 1876 under presidents Marshal Santiago González and Andrés del Valle. In 1876, Guatemalan president Justo Rufino Barrios launched an invasion of El Salvador after Valle and González refused to support a Guatemalan invasion of Honduras. They surrendered in two weeks and Barrios' Salvadoran allies established the Junta of Notables. This junta elected Rafael Zaldívar, a pragmatic liberal, as President of El Salvador.

In 1883, General Manuel Estévez launched an attempted coup against Zaldívar in the city of Nueva San Salvador, but the coup failed. Divisional General Francisco Menéndez, an idealist liberal, fled El Salvador for exile in Guatemala after the coup failed, but he returned shortly afterwards when Zaldívar issued an amnesty. Menéndez returned to Guatemala after he objected the 1883 constitution as it allowed Zaldívar to seek re-election. On 28 February 1885, Barrios issued a unilateral proclamation declaring the reunification of Central America. Honduras accepted the declaration, but Costa Rica, El Salvador, and Nicaragua rejected it. Barrios launched an invasion of El Salvador on 30 March but he was killed in action during the Battle of Chalchuapa on 2 April. Menéndez supported Barrios' invasion.

== Revolution ==
=== Against Rafael Zaldívar ===
On 10 May 1885, Menéndez and Divisional General Estanislao Pérez invaded El Salvador from Guatemala and occupied the city of Chalchuapa without resistance. Menéndez and Pérez commanded Salvadorans who were exiled from previous rebellions against Zaldívar's government. The invasion was supported by the Guatemalan government established after Barrios' death. In Chalchuapa, Menéndez issued a declaration—the "Plan of Chalchuapa"—rejecting the legitimacy of Zaldívar's government for issuing the 1883 constitution. He established himself as the caudillo (leader) of an anti-Zaldívar revolution by proclaiming himself as El Salvador's provisional president and claimed that he had a "right to insurrection". Over 250 residents of Chalchuapa signed Menéndez's declaration. On 12 May, General Rafael Antonio Gutiérrez led indigenous soldiers in capturing Nahuizalco. They attempted and failed to capture the adjacent town of Atiquizaya. Loyalist troops commanded by Brigadier General Fernando Figueroa attacked indigenous rebels in Izalco, robbing and raping some indigenous locals in the process.

On 12 May, Menéndez attacked the city of Santa Ana. General Narciso Avilés, the governor of the Santa Ana Department, commanded 400 soldiers there. On 14 May, Zaldívar's government dispatched Divisional Generals Indalecio Miranda, Adán Mora, and Carlos Molina to occupy important positions around San Salvador, the country's capital. Mora stationed his soldiers in Coatepeque to block Menéndez from marching his soldiers along a major road to San Salvador. Molina moved his soldiers to El Bejuco where Menéndez ambushed and defeated him. After this battle, Menéndez issued an ultimatum to Santa Ana's defenders threatening to burn the city if they would not surrender; Avilés surrendered and Menéndez captured Santa Ana. That same day, General José María Rivas led an indigenous insurrection in Cojutepeque. The city was captured by Rivas's 6,000-strong indigenous army.

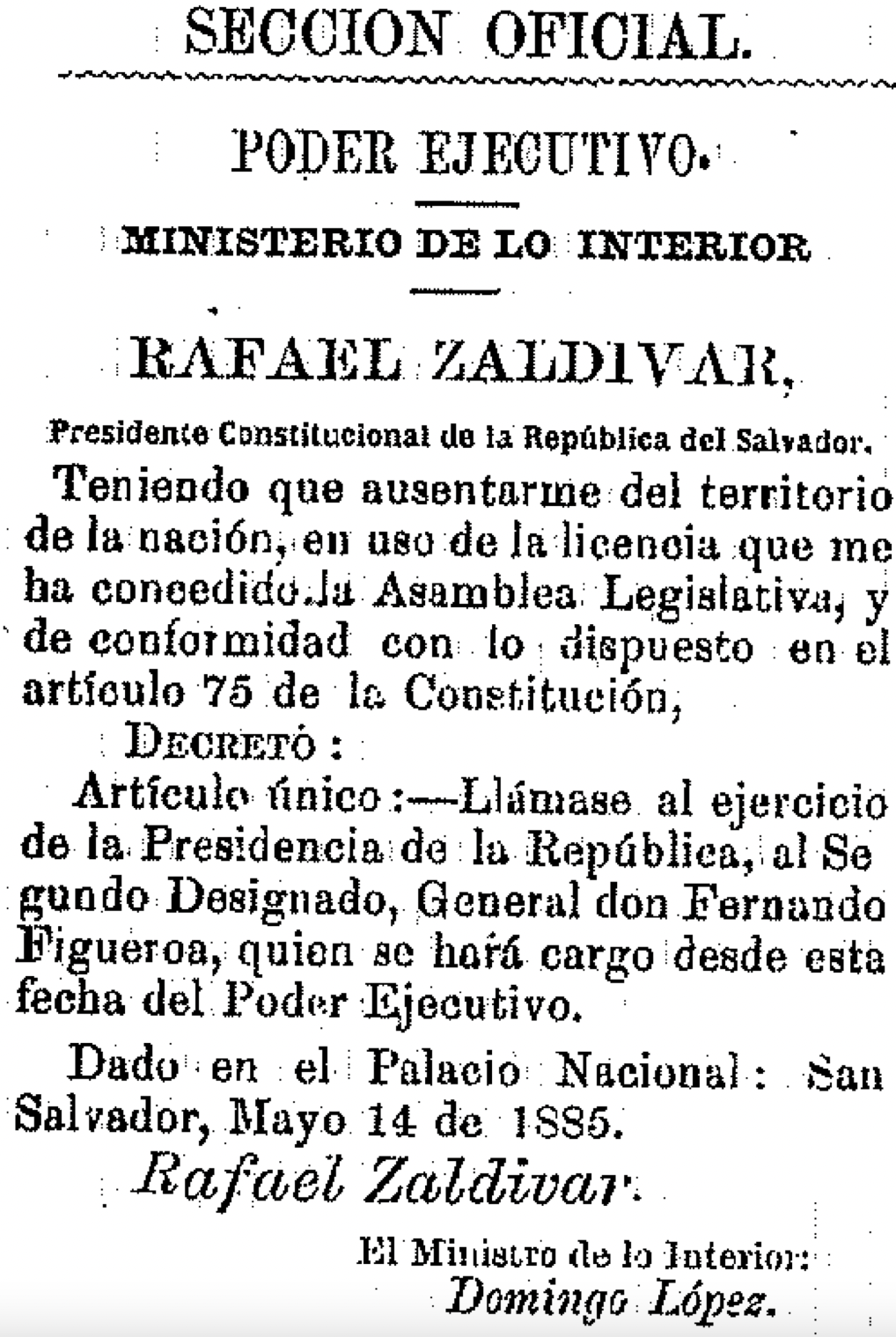
Rafael Zaldívar's resignation published on 14 May 1885 in Diario Oficial

Zaldívar, seeing the severity of the revolution against him, resigned from the presidency on 14 May and fled El Salvador for Europe. Zaldívar was succeeded by Figueroa as provisional president since he was the second presidential designate (third in the line of presidential succession). Figueroa also became the commander-in-chief of the Salvadoran Army. During the revolution, Figueroa established a society to support wounded soldiers and suspended the construction of new schools and courts. He also appointed a new cabinet after the members of Zaldívar's cabinet resigned.

=== Against Fernando Figueroa ===
On 16 May, Generals Mardoqueo Sandoval and José Domingo Arce captured the city of Sonsonate. That same day, the Chamber of Deputies (lower house) of the National Assembly promoted Figueroa to the rank of divisional general. On 19 May, Sandoval captured the city of Armenia, but Miranda's troops forced Sandoval to retreat after a four-hour battle. According to a message sent to Figueroa by Miranda, the battle resulted in "many" deaths, including Pérez's nephew. On 20 May, Honduran president Luis Bográn offered to mediate peace between Menéndez and Figueroa. Members of Menéndez's family were arrested in Ahuachapán on 24 May, but Figueroa ordered their release after Menéndez asked for such, pointing out that he did not harm Figueroa's family members in Santa Ana.

Manuel Sol and Nicolás Tigerino, delegates from Figueroa's government, met Menéndez on 25 May and asked to hold peace negotiations. These negotiations failed by the following day, and Menéndez rejected a potential meeting with Figueroa himself when they were unable to agree on a meeting location. On 27 May, the Diario Oficial government newspaper officially declared Menéndez to be in a state of rebellion. Figueroa and Sub-Secretary of War Manuel Herrera also implemented a nationwide conscription of all men between the ages of 18 and 50 in accordance with article 124 of the constitution that calls for conscription during a war or rebellion. The same day, 1,000 government soldiers commanded by General Miguel Brioso engaged Rivas's troops on the El Chachacaste hill near Cojutepeque, but Rivas's counteroffensive forced Brioso's army to retreat. On 31 May, Colonel Crescencio Castellanos seized Suchitoto in support of Menéndez's revolution.

A force of 500 Nicaraguans commanded by Brigadier General Narcio Talavera landed in La Unión on 4 June to reinforce Figueroa's government. On 5 June, Figueroa's government declared Menéndez to be a usurper. That day, revolutionary forces captured the city of Chalatenango. Government forces launched a counteroffensive to recapture Chalatenango but failed. On 11 June, Brioso attempted to abandon Cojutepeque and relocate to Ilobasco, but Rivas attacked Brioso's 800 soldiers and forced Brioso's surrender. The following day, Rivas defeated Talavera's Nicaraguans at Santo Domingo. Government forces abandoned Ahuachapán on 14 June, and the city was captured by Colonel Juan Leiva in support of the revolutionaries.

On 17 June, Mora and Molina surrendered to revolutionary forces in Coatepeque. Figueroa, believing that the revolution's success was inevitable, resigned from the presidency on 18 June and fled El Salvador, fearing for his life. The presidency passed to Senator José Rosales who was the third presidential designate (fourth in the presidential line of succession). Rosales and Menéndez signed a peace treaty in San Andrés on 19 June. Menéndez made a triumphal entry into San Salvador on 22 June at the command of the "Liberation Army" ("Ejército Liberator"). The city's residents celebrated his entry. There, Rosales officially ceded the presidency to Menéndez.

== Aftermath ==
"We do not hesitate to assure you that 22 June will live forever in the memory of the Salvadoran people:
it is the first day of a new era." (Note: In Spanish: "No vacilamos en asegurar que el 22 de junio vivirá siempre en la memoria del pueblo salvadoreño: es el día inicial de una nueva era.")

— Liberation Army's Bulletin No. 15, 24 June 1885

On 26 June, Menéndez issued a published to the Salvadoran people in the Diario Oficial newspaper. In it, he reiterated his criticism of Zaldívar's government and praised the actions of his allies and the Liberation Army during the revolution. Menéndez pledged to hold call the Constituent Assembly to draft a new constitution that was compatible with "progressive and liberal politics" ("política progresista y liberal"); restructure El Salvador's finances as it was bankrupt; establish educational institutions for the public; abolish torture; guarantee freedom of the press and freedom of speech; and establish an independent judiciary; among other idealist liberal goals.

Menéndez rejected the 1885 constitution as it was drafted by his opponents. He dissolved the Constituent Assembly and installed a new one filled with his supporters the following year. They drafted the 1886 constitution, that among other things, banned immediate re-election of the president and established a unicameral legislature. This constitution lasted 53 years until 1939 when it was replaced by a new constitution that allowed Brigadier General Maximiliano Hernández Martínez to seek presidential re-election. The 1886 constitution remains El Salvador's longest-lasting constitution. Menéndez's idealist liberal government gave Nahuizalco's indigenous population control of the municipality's ayuntamiento (council) as a reward for supporting the revolution. Menéndez also rewarded Rosales by appointing him as a commander-in-chief of the army in June 1885 and as state councilor in December 1885. Menéndez won the 1887 presidential election unopposed in a popular vote.

Although Menéndez appointed Rivas as governor of the Cuscatlán Department, Rivas attempted two coups against Menéndez for perceived personal snubs against him in 1888 and 1890; both were suppressed. Disillusioned idealist liberals also attempted a coup in 1889, believing that Menéndez had betrayed their causes. Menéndez ruled El Salvador until he was overthrown and killed in a coup led by General Carlos Ezeta (a pragmatic reformist) on 22 June 1890, five years to the day after he became president. In 1894, Ezeta was overthrown by Gutiérrez and he served as president until his own overthrow in 1898 by General Tomás Regalado, a pragmatic liberal. After this coup, the pragmatic liberals controlled El Salvador until 1927. Figueroa returned to El Salvador during Ezeta's presidency and eventually regained the presidency, ruling from 1907 to 1911 after winning a presidential election. Zaldívar was granted amnesty by the Legislative Assembly in 1896. He served as a diplomat in Europe and died in Paris, France in 1903.

== See also ==
- List of Salvadoran coup d'états
- List of wars involving El Salvador
