= Fabio Morán =

Salvadoran general

Divisional General Fabio Morán

9th Minister of War of El Salvador
- In office 2 January 1877 – 30 November 1877
- President: Rafael Zaldívar
- Preceded by: Rafael Zaldívar
- Succeeded by: Adán Mora

Minister of Finance of El Salvador
- In office 1 May 1876 – 1877
- President: Rafael Zaldívar

Deputy of the Constituent Assembly of El Salvador from Ahuachapán
- In office 1883

Personal details
- Born: Fabio Morán Molina; 24 December 1830 Ahuachapán, Federal Republic of Central America
- Died: 8 November 1897 (aged 66) Ahuachapán, El Salvador
- Party: Liberal
- Spouse: Carmen Tovar
- Occupation: Military officer, politician

Military service
- Allegiance: El Salvador
- Branch/service: Salvadoran Army
- Rank: Divisional general
- Battles/wars: 1871 Salvadoran coup d'état; Guatemalan Salvadoran War; Menéndez's revolution; Revolution of the 44

Fabio Morán Molina (24 December 1830 – 8 November 1897) was a Salvadoran military officer and politician. He served as the Minister of War and Promotion under President Rafael Zaldívar.

== Biography ==
Fabio Morán Molina was born on 24 December 1830 in Ahuachapán, El Salvador, Federal Republic of Central America. His parents were Norberto Morán and Carmen Molina. He married Carmen Tovar.

Morán participated in both the 1871 Salvadoran coup d'état that overthrew President Francisco Dueñas and the Guatemalan–Salvadoran War of 1876 that overthrew President Andrés del Valle and Marshal Santiago González. After 1876, he was a senator in the Senate of El Salvador. President Rafael Zaldívar also appointed him as Minister of Finance, serving from 1876 to 1877. He was a deputy of the Constituent Assembly from Ahuachapán Department in 1883.

Morán was promoted to divisional general on 11 May 1885. He fled El Salvador to Nicaragua the next month after Menéndez's revolution overthrew Zaldívar. Morán returned to El Salvador to overthrow President Carlos Ezeta during the Revolution of the 44. Morán died in Ahuachapán on 8 November 1897.

Political offices
| Preceded by Rafael Zaldívar | Minister of War of El Salvador; 1877 | Succeeded by Adán Mora |
