= Abrahám Castillo Mora =

Salvadoran politician and military officer

Divisional General Abrahám Castillo Mora

Governor of Sonsonate
- In office ?–?

Governor Ahuachapán
- In office 1882–1882

Deputy of the Legislative Assembly of El Salvador from Ahuachapán
- In office 1900 – 1901, 1908

Deputy of the Legislative Assembly of El Salvador from Sonsonate
- In office 1879–1880

Personal details
- Born: Sonsonate, El Salvador
- Died: 1910 El Salvador
- Spouse: Josefa Rodríguez
- Occupation: Politician, military officer

Military service
- Allegiance: El Salvador
- Branch/service: Salvadoran Army
- Years of service: c. 1870s–1890s
- Rank: Divisional general

Abrahám Castillo Mora (died 1910) was a Salvadoran politician and military officer from Sonsonate who served as governor of the Ahuachapán and Sonsonate departments, as well as being a deputy of the Legislative Assembly of El Salvador for Sonsonate. He was involved in several land disputes during the late-1890s.

== Military and political career ==
Castillo served as a deputy of the Legislative Assembly of El Salvador for the department of Sonsonate from 1879 to 1880, where he was born. He served as military judge of Ahuachapán in April 1881, and later as its governor in 1882. He held the military position of Commander of Arms and served as the governor of Sonsonate under Presidents Rafael Zaldívar (1876–1885) and Carlos Ezeta (1890–1894). He was promoted to colonel on 14 May 1885, to brigadier general on 18 May 1885, and to divisional general on 19 May 1885 by the Chamber of Deputies. He returned to Legislative Assembly in 1900 and served as a deputy from the department of Ahuachapán until 1901.

== Land disputes ==
In 1896, Castillo Mora bought 4 caballerías (180 hectares) land in Dolores, Cabañas, for 4,200 pesos from partidor Luciano Argueta which caused a controversy with another partidor, Simeón Morán, which ended with the intervention of President Rafael Antonio Gutiérrez. Due to peasants from the Santa Ana Volcano occupying the land he purchased, he attempted to sell the land to the government, however, a government legal advisor rejected the offer believing that the purchase would be unconstitutional, advising him to take the issue to court instead. He also attempted to buy land in Ataco, Ahuachapán, but the department's governor prevented him from doing so.
