= Baltasar Estupinián =

Salvadoran politician

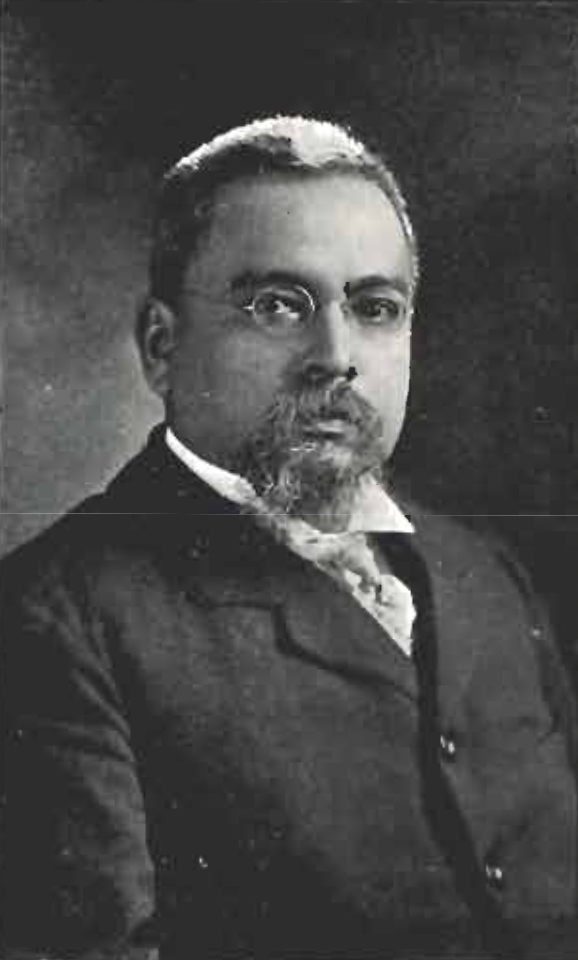

Vice President of El Salvador
- In office 1 March 1887 – 17 March 1887
- President: Francisco Menéndez
- Preceded by: Santiago González
- Succeeded by: Antonio Ezeta

Personal details
- Born: 1854
- Died: March 1922 (aged 67–68)

Baltasar Estupinián (1854 – March 1922) was a Salvadoran politician who was briefly Vice President of El Salvador during the presidency of Francisco Menéndez.

Estupinián was born in 1854. He worked as a journalist and worked for El Universo. In the beginning of the Rafael Zaldívar administration, Estupinián had to emigrate to Guatemala, fleeing the persecution and harassment. He settled in Quezaltenango, where he founded newspaper El Bien Público.

During the administration of General Francisco Menéndez, Estupinián succeeded José Antonio Quiroz as Minister of Public Works on 21 April 1886. He also assumed the positions of Minister of the Interior, Public Education, Public Works, and Charity.

Estupinián was elected Vice President of El Salvador in the 1887 elections. He took office on 1 March 1887, but was forced to resign from that office by the National Constituent Assembly, to clear the path for President General Menéndez. Shortly after, he also resigned from his other portfolios and relocated permanently to Guatemala City. He also retired from politics at that time. He was a prominent freemason.

Estupinián died in March 1922.
