= Greater Republic of Central America =

Political union between El Salvador, Honduras, and Nicaragua from 1896 to 1898

Greater Republic of Central America República Mayor de Centroamérica
- 1896–1898
- Flag Coat of arms

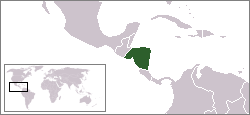
- Capital: Amapala
- Common languages: Spanish
- Government: Republic
- Legislature: Executive Federal Council
- History
  - Treaty of Amapala: 20 June 1895
  - Established: 15 September 1896
  - Constitution: 1 November 1898
  - Disestablished: 29 November 1898

Area
  - Total: 263,907 km^{2} (101,895 sq mi)

Population
  - 1898 estimate: 1,720,000
Preceded by
El Salvador
Honduras
Nicaragua
Succeeded by
El Salvador
Honduras
Nicaragua
- Today part of: El Salvador, Honduras, Nicaragua

The Greater Republic of Central America (Spanish: República Mayor de Centroamérica), later the United States of Central America (Spanish: Estados Unidos de Centroamérica), originally planned to be known as the Republic of Central America (Spanish: República de América Central), was a short-lived political union between El Salvador, Honduras, and Nicaragua, lasting from 1896 to 1898. It was an attempt to revive the failed Federal Republic of Central America that existed earlier in the century.

The three countries agreed to establish a union with the signing of the Treaty of Amapala on 20 June 1895. On 15 September 1896, after the countries had all ratified the treaty individually, the union was formally confirmed. The republic was rechristened the "United States of Central America" when its constitution came into effect on 1 November 1898.

The capital was to be the Honduran town of Amapala on the Gulf of Fonseca. The union was dissolved on 29 November 1898 after General Tomás Regalado seized power in El Salvador on 13 November 1898.

Before its dissolution, the Greater Republic established diplomatic relationships with the United States. Guatemala and Costa Rica both considered joining the union, but neither of them did so.

== Background ==
During the late 1880s, Guatemalan president General Manuel Barillas pushed the idea in Guatemala and neighboring El Salvador and Honduras to recreate a Central American union like the long dissolved Federal Republic of Central America. The pressure resulted in the nations of Guatemala, El Salvador, Honduras, and Nicaragua signing a treaty in San Salvador on 15 October 1889 which proclaimed the Republic of Central America. The republic was set to be established on 15 September 1890, to coincide with the date of independence of the original Federal Republic. On 22 June 1890, however, Salvadoran president General Francisco Menéndez was assassinated and his successor, General Carlos Ezeta, pulled out of the treaty, effectively killing the union before it was even formed. Guatemala refused to recognize Ezeta's presidency and declared war on El Salvador on 27 June 1890. The United States sent warships to the coasts of El Salvador and Guatemala to protect American interests in both countries and put pressure on both governments to end the war which the two agreed to do so on 21 August 1890. The treaty was signed by the five nations of Central America and legitimized Ezeta's government.

On 23 May 1892, El Salvador, Guatemala, Honduras, and Nicaragua signed a peace treaty strengthen relations and "sentiments of brotherhood" and leave a possibility open for a future Central American union. The treaty did little to ease relations however as Honduras and Nicaragua went to war in 1893 when Honduran president Domingo Vásquez accused Nicaraguan president José Santos Zelaya of supporting Honduran refugees to lead a revolution. The war ended on 22 February 1894 with the overthrow of Vásquez and the Nicaraguans establishing Policarpo Bonilla as President.

Meanwhile, in El Salvador, Ezeta, who derailed the formation of a union previously, was challenged by Salvadoran rebels on 29 April 1894 for the presidency. Led by Doroteo Caballero, the rebels attacked Ezeta's forces, and with the support of Guatemala, Honduras, and Nicaragua, overthrew Ezeta on 10 June 1894. General Rafael Antonio Gutiérrez, one of the revolution's leaders, became President of El Salvador. Ten days the revolution, the nations of El Salvador, Honduras, and Nicaragua met to officially recreate the Central American republic.

== Treaty of Amapala ==
The Treaty of Amapala was signed by the delegations of the Central American nations of El Salvador, Honduras, and Nicaragua, on 20 June 1895. The treaty was signed on the Honduran city of Amapala on Tiger Island in the Gulf of Fonseca and the signing was hosted by Bonilla. The treaty was not a constitution and the republic's existence relied solely on each member's willingness to remain in the union, but nonetheless established the Greater Republic of Central America with its capital at Amapala.

The treaty had three articles.

=== Article I ===
The Republics of El Salvador, Nicaragua, and Honduras shall hereafter form a single political entity for the exercise of sovereignty as regards their intercourse with foreign nations, to be known as the Greater Republic of Central America. This name shall continue in use until the republics of Guatemala and Costa Rica voluntarily accept the present treaty, in which case it shall be called the "Republic of Central America."

=== Article II ===
The signatory governments do not by the present treaty, renounce their autonomy and independence as regards the direction of their internal affairs, and the constitution and laws of each state shall remain in force so far as they are not inconsistent with the provisions of the present treaty.

=== Article III ===
For the execution of the provisions contained in Article I, there shall be a diet composed of one member and one substitute, elected by each of the Congresses of the signatory republics for a term of three years.

== Quick collapse ==
Neither Guatemala nor Costa Rica signed the treaty but they both did show interest in joining. The Greater Republic was officially formed on 15 September 1896. U.S. president Grover Cleveland recognized the nation on 24 December 1896.

On 27 August 1898, representatives met in Managua to draft and sign the constitution of the Greater Republic. The Constitution of the Greater Republic of Central America was ratified on 1 November 1898, officially changing the name of the country to the United States of Central America. With the ratification of the constitution, the Executive Federal Council was established in Amapala. The council was full of provisional members who scheduled a general election for sometime in December 1898 to elect members to the Executive Federal Council and to elect the first president of Central America which were set to take office sometime in March 1899.

On 13 November 1898, just 12 days after the constitution was ratified, Gutiérrez was overthrown by General Tomás Regalado, a fellow member of the revolution which had ousted Ezeta 4 years earlier. Regalado declared that El Salvador would no longer be a member of the union since he believed that the interests of El Salvador would "suffer." The Executive Federal Council attempted to come to a compromise with Regalado by offering El Salvador greater autonomy but Regalado refused, and when the military leaders of Honduras and Nicaragua failed to take military action against El Salvador, the Executive Federal Council declared the dissolution of the nation on 29 November 1898.

=== Heads of State ===
Year	El Salvador	Honduras	Nicaragua	Greater Republic
1895	Rafael Antonio Gutiérrez; Until 13 Nov. 1898	Policarpo Bonilla	José Santos Zelaya	Vacant
1896	Rafael Antonio Gutiérrez; Until 13 Nov. 1898	Policarpo Bonilla	José Santos Zelaya	Vacant
1897	Rafael Antonio Gutiérrez; Until 13 Nov. 1898	Policarpo Bonilla	José Santos Zelaya	Vacant
1898	Tomás Regalado; From 13 Nov. 1898	Policarpo Bonilla	José Santos Zelaya	Vacant

== Significance ==
The Greater Republic was the last successful attempt to create a Central American union as a single political entity. One last attempt would follow from 1921 to 1922 between Costa Rica, El Salvador, Guatemala, and Honduras, but ultimately fell apart due to the lack of support from Nicaragua.

Since then, some international entities have been created by the Central American nations such as the now defunct Organization of Central American States (1951-1973), and the currently existing Central American Court of Justice (est. 1901), Central American Integration System and Central American Parliament (est. 1991), Dominican Republic–Central America Free Trade Agreement (est. 2005), Central America-4 Border Control Agreement and Central America-4 passport (est. 2006), and the Mesoamerica Project (est. 2008).

== See also ==
- Central American reunification
- History of Central America
- 1923 Central American Treaty of Peace and Amity
