= Constitution of the Greater Republic of Central America =

Defunct constitution of Central America

Constitution of the United States of Central America
- Created: 27 August 1898
- Date effective: 1 November 1898
- Repealed: 29 November 1898
- Supersedes: Treaty of Amapala

The Constitution of the Greater Republic of Central America, officially the Constitution of the United States of Central America, was the supreme law of the United States of Central America in late 1898.

== History ==
On 20 June 1895, the nations of El Salvador, Honduras, and Nicaragua signed the Treaty of Amapala which established the Greater Republic of Central America, a political union between the three nations. The treaty was not a constitution for the nation and the republic's existed relied solely on each member's willingness to remain in the union.

On 27 August 1898, representatives met in Managua to draft and sign the constitution of the Greater Republic. The Constitution was ratified on 1 November 1898, officially changing the name of the country to the United States of Central America. With the ratification of the constitution, the Executive Federal Council was established in Amapala. The council was full of provisional members who scheduled a general election for sometime in December 1898 to elect members to the Executive Federal Council and to elect the first President of Central America which were set to take office sometime in March 1899.

The constitution was only effective for 29 days. On 13 November 1898, Salvadoran President Rafael Antonio Gutiérrez was overthrown by Tomás Regalado Sánchez which caused a crisis within the nation. Military leaders of Honduras and Nicaragua took no action against the coup which lead to the Executive Federal Council declaring the dissolution of the nation on 29 November 1898.

== Provisions ==
=== Preamble ===
We, the Representatives of the people of the States of Honduras, Nicaragua and El Salvador, meeting in the General Assembly, decree and sanction the following:

=== Structure ===
- Title I: Of the Nation and the bases of union of the States (arts. 1-6)
- Title II: Of sovereignty, territory and form of government (arts. 7-14)
- Title III: Of civil rights and social guarantees (arts. 15-43)
- Title IV: Of nationals and foreigners (arts. 44-50)
- Title V: Of the citizens (arts. 51-53)
- Title VI: Of the elections (arts. 54-57)
- Title VII: Of the Legislative Branch (arts. 58-73)
- Title VIII: Common Powers of the Chambers (art. 74)
- Title IX: Attributions peculiar to the Chamber of Deputies (art. 75)
- Title X: Peculiar powers of the Senate (art. 76)
- Title XI: Attributions of the two Chambers meeting (arts. 77-78)
- Title XII: Attributions of the Legislative Branch (arts. 79-81)
- Title XIII: On the formation and promulgation of the law (arts. 82-92)
- Title XIV: Of the Executive Branch (arts. 93-100)
- Title XV: Of the Ministers of State (arts. 101-106)
- Title XVI: Duties of the Executive Branch (art. 107)
- Title XVII: Attributions of the Executive Branch (arts. 108-110)
- Title XVIII: Of the Budget (arts. 111-114)
- Title XVIX: Of the National Treasury (arts. 115-118)
- Title XX: Of the Army and the Navy (arts. 119-123)
- Title XXI: Of the Judicial Branch (arts. 124-133)
- Title XXII: Of Township (arts. 134-137)
- Title XXIII: Of the responsibility of public officials (arts. 138-143)
- Title XXIV: Of the reform of the Constitution and the constitutive laws (arts. 144-147)
- Title XXV: Transitory dispositions (arts. 148-161)

== See also ==
- Politics of Central America
- Politics of El Salvador
- Politics of Honduras
- Politics of Nicaragua
