= Fernando Figueroa =

President of El Salvador (1885; 1907–1911)

Divisional General Fernando Figueroa
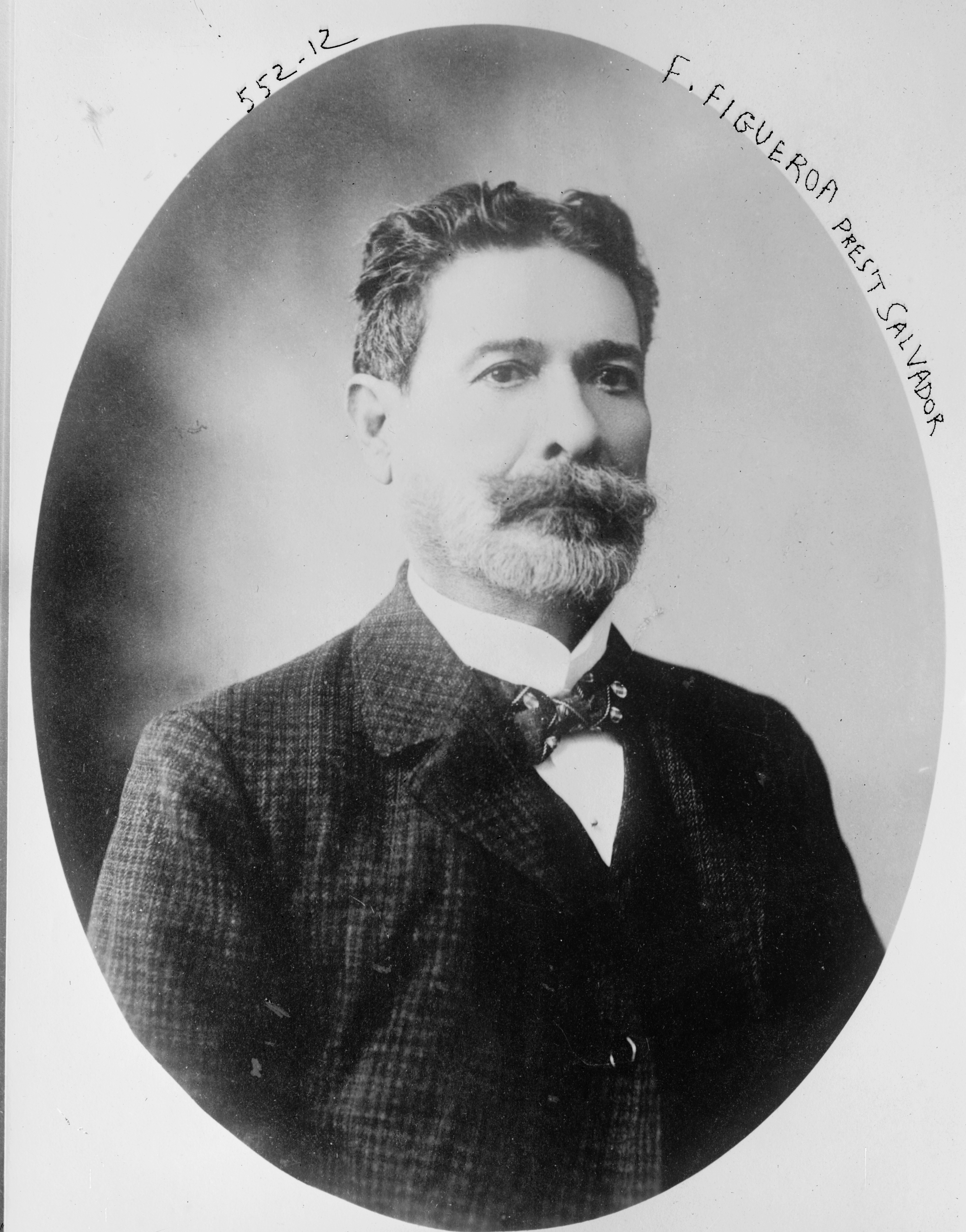
- Official portrait, c. 1907–1910

20th President of El Salvador
- In office 1 March 1907 – 1 March 1911
- Vice President: Manuel Enrique Araujo
- Preceded by: Pedro José Escalón
- Succeeded by: Manuel Enrique Araujo
- In office 14 May 1885 – 18 June 1885; Provisional President
- Preceded by: Rafael Zaldívar
- Succeeded by: José Rosales (acting)

19th Minister of War and the Navy of El Salvador
- In office 1 March 1903 – 10 September 1907
- President: Pedro José Escalón (until 1907); Himself (1907)
- Preceded by: Tomás Regalado
- Succeeded by: José María Peralta Lagos

Personal details
- Born: 4 March 1849 Ilobasco, El Salvador
- Died: 16 June 1919 (aged 70) San Salvador, El Salvador
- Party: Liberal
- Spouse: Luz Rodríguez (m. 1878)
- Children: 6
- Relatives: Fabio Castillo Figueroa (grandson)
- Occupation: Politician, military officer

Military service
- Allegiance: El Salvador
- Branch/service: Salvadoran Army
- Years of service: 1863–1885, 1891–1911
- Rank: Divisional general
- Battles/wars: War of 1863 (WIA); Honduran–Salvadoran War; First Honduran intervention; Battle of Sábana Grande; Battle of Santa Bárbara; Second Honduran intervention; Battle of Amapala; Guatemalan–Salvadoran War; Battle of Pasaquina (WIA); Menéndez's revolution; Second Totoposte War; Third Totoposte War; War of 1907

Fernando Figueroa (4 March 1849 – 16 June 1919) was a Salvadoran politician and military officer who served as the 20th President of El Salvador in 1885 and from 1907 to 1911. He also served as Minister of War and the Navy and as Governor of the San Vicente Department.

== Early life and career ==
Fernando Figueroa was born in Ilobasco, El Salvador. As a teenager, he enlisted in the Salvadoran Army and fought in the War of 1863 against Guatemala under the command of President Gerardo Barrios. During the war, Figueroa was promoted to lieutenant for distinguished service while severely wounded. After the war and Gerardo Barrios' overthrow, President Francisco Dueñas promoted Figueroa to captain. Figueroa commanded government soldiers during the 1871 Honduran–Salvadoran War that ended in Dueñas' overthrow by Marshal Santiago González.

Figueroa was briefly dismissed from the army but returned in 1872 when El Salvador went to war with Honduras. He participated in the invasion of Honduras and commanded Salvadoran forces at the battles of Sábana Grande and Santa Bárbara. He was promoted to lieutenant colonel for his service at the Battle of Sábana Grande. Figueroa was also a part of another war with Honduras in 1873, during which, he commanded troops during the Battle of Amapala.

In 1873, President González appointed Figueroa as Governor of the San Vicente Department. By 1876, he was promoted to the rank of general. Figueroa was again wounded in action at the Battle of Pasaquina during the Guatemalan–Salvadoran War of 1876 that resulted in Rafael Zaldívar being appointed President of El Salvador by Guatemalan president Justo Rufino Barrios.

== First presidency ==
In May 1885, Divisional General Francisco Menéndez launched a revolution against Zaldívar shortly after Justo Rufino Barrios was killed in action after he invaded El Salvador. Menéndez's revolution was supported by the new Guatemalan government. Zaldívar resigned on 14 May and fled El Salvador, upon which Figueroa assumed the presidency in a provisional capacity as he was the second presidential designate (third in the presidential line of succession). He also assumed supreme command of all Salvadoran government forces.

Zaldívar's cabinet resigned when Figueroa became provisional president. Due to this, Figueroa made the following cabinet appointments: Rafael Ayala as General Minister; Isidro Paredes as Minister of the Interior and Public Instruction; and Domingo López as Minister of Finance and the Navy. As president, Figueroa created the Society for the Protection of the Wounded, implemented conscription for all Salvadorans, and suspended the construction of schools and courts. He was promoted to divisional general by the legislature on 16 May.

Figueroa attempted to suppress Menéndez's revolution, but as violence continued into June, Figueroa resigned on 18 June and handed the presidency to Senator José Rosales, the third presidential designate. Figueroa then fled El Salvador fearing for his life. Menéndez eventually became President of El Salvador on 22 June and he ruled until 22 June 1890 when he was killed in a coup led by General Carlos Ezeta.

== Between presidencies ==
Figueroa returned to El Salvador after Ezeta's presidential inauguration in 1891. Ezeta appointed Figueroa back to his former position as Governor of San Vicente. In March 1900, President Tomás Regalado appointed Figueroa as Minister of War and the Navy.

== Second presidency ==
Figueroa was a presidential candidate in the 1907 presidential election. The election was fixed in his favor as President Pedro José Escalón handpicked Figueroa as his successor. Figueroa won 152,053 votes—99.76 percent. Figueroa assumed office on 1 March 1907. Manuel Enrique Araujo was his vice president. Figueroa appointed the following cabinet members: Tomás García Palomo as Minister of Governance, Promotion, and Public Instruction; Ramón García González as Minister of External Relations, Justice, and Charity; and Federico Mejía as Minister of Finance and Public Credit. He remained as Minister of War and the Navy.

Several politicians and military officers led by General Luis Alonso Barahona opposed Escalón choosing Figueroa as his successor. Barahona ran against Figueroa in the 1907 presidential election but he was arrested and his supporters were repressed. Barahona finished as the election's runner-up and won only 222 votes—0.15 percent. General Manuel Rivas launched a rebellion against Figueroa but it was suppressed. In 1907, Honduras, Nicaragua, Salvadoran rebels, and American filibusters invaded El Salvador as Nicaraguan president José Santos Zelaya wanted Prudencio Alfaro to win the 1907 presidential election, in which Alfaro only won 1 vote. The invasion violated the 1907 Central American Treaty of Peace and Amity earlier that year. Fighting only lasted one day and the United States mediated a peace treaty by December.

Figueroa's term expired on 1 March 1911 and he was succeeded by Araujo who won the 1911 presidential election.

== Personal life ==
Figueroa married Luz Rodríguez in 1878. The couple had six children: three sons and three daughters through whom he had nine grandchildren, including 20th century politician Fabio Castillo Figueroa. One of Figueroa's sons married a daughter of General Rafael Antonio Gutiérrez who was president from 1894 to 1898. Figueroa was a pragmatic liberal.

== Death ==
Figueroa died on in San Salvador, El Salvador, on 16 June 1919 at 6:15 p.m.

== See also ==
- List of heads of state and government who have been in exile

Political offices
Preceded by Rafael Zaldívar	President of El Salvador (provisional); 1885	Succeeded by José Rosales (acting)
Preceded by Tomás Regalado	Minister of War and the Navy of El Salvador; 1903–1907	Succeeded by José María Peralta Lagos
Preceded by Pedro José Escalón	President of El Salvador; 1907–1911	Succeeded by Manuel Enrique Araujo
