= 1890 Salvadoran coup d'état =

Coup d'état

| Date | 22 June 1890 |
| Location | San Salvador, El Salvador |
| Result | Coup successful: President Francisco Menéndez overthrown |

Belligerents
| Salvadoran government | Salvadoran Army |

Commanders and leaders
| Francisco Menéndez † | Carlos Ezeta |

Strength
| Unknown | Unknown |

The 1890 Salvadoran coup d'état was a military rebellion led by General Carlos Ezeta against President Francisco Menéndez, that occurred on June 22, 1890.

== Background and coup d'état ==
President Francisco Menéndez, politically an Idealist Liberal, gained power on June 22, 1885 after overthrowing Presidents Rafael Zaldívar and Fernando Figueroa.

Ezeta, a pragmatic liberal and former ally of Menéndez, felt betrayed as he had been excluded from the "Junta of Notables" that Menéndez formed to select a successor. On June 22, 1890, Ezeta along with a small army he had rounded up, stormed the Presidential Palace in San Salvador during a banquet which Menéndez was present at. President Menéndez supposedly attempted to hold back Ezeta's forces with a sword in the palace gardens, though he would be found dead in the aftermath of the rebellion.

Ezeta proclaimed himself Provisional President that same night, also appointing his brother, Antonio Ezeta, the commander-in-chief of the army. Antonio later became the Vice President.

== See also ==
- List of Salvadoran coup d'états
- History of El Salvador
