= Totoposte Wars =

Series of wars in Central America from 1890 to 1906

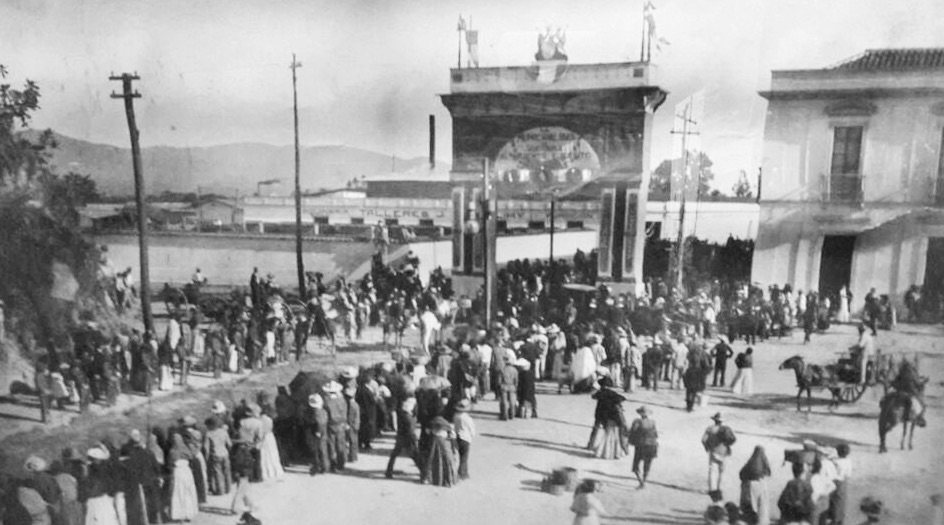
- Guatemalan soldiers in Guatemala City in 1903.
Date	1890 (first war); 1903 (second war); 1906 (third war)
Location	Central America, mostly in Guatemala
Result	Status quo ante bellum

Belligerents
First Totoposte War; El Salvador	First Totoposte War; Guatemala; Salvadoran exiles
Second Totoposte War; El Salvador; Mexico; Guatemalan exiles	Second Totoposte War; Guatemala
Third Totoposte War; El Salvador; Mexico; Guatemalan exiles	Third Totoposte War; Guatemala

Commanders and leaders
First Totoposte War; Carlos Ezeta; Antonio Ezeta	First Totoposte War; Manuel Barillas; Juan Martín Barrundia †; Camilo Álvarez
Second Totoposte War; Tomás Regalado; Porfirio Díaz; Manuel Barillas	Second Totoposte War; Manuel Estrada Cabrera
Third Totoposte War; Pedro José Escalón; Tomás Regalado †; Porfirio Díaz; Maximiliano Aguilar Santa María; Manuel Barillas	Third Totoposte War; Manuel Estrada Cabrera

Strength
Unknown	55,000

The Totoposte Wars were three military conflicts fought in Central America between 1890 and 1906. The First Totoposte War occurred during the presidency of Manuel Lisandro Barillas Bercián in Guatemala, after the overthrow of Salvadoran President Francisco Menéndez by General Carlos Ezeta in El Salvador, which caused the exile of many Salvadorans who took refuge in Guatemala and who requested the help of President Barillas Bercián to stop the armies of Ezeta. The Second Totoposte War arose after the opposition of Guatemalan President Manuel Estrada Cabrera to the integration of Guatemala with the Greater Republic of Central America since Estrada Cabrera was more inclined to work with the government of the United States. The Third Totoposte War occurred in 1906 in similar conditions. In all three wars, the Guatemalan people mockingly referred to the war as the "Totoposte War" because it only served to consume large amounts of this corn-based food, without actually fighting.

== Background, 1890 ==
On June 22, 1890, Salvadoran president Francisco Menéndez was overthrown by General Carlos Ezeta. As a result, many officials with ties to the previous administration fled the country to Guatemala. The officials made a request to Guatemalan President Manuel Lisandro Barillas Bercián to invade El Salvador and depose Ezeta, alleging that he was planning an invasion of Guatemala. The claims were false as the officials wanted to regain power, but Barillas Bercián believed the claims and made a decree declaring war on El Salvador on June 27, 1890.

== First War ==
Guatemalan soldiers were mobilized to the border with El Salvador. A column of Guatemalan troops, composed of forces from Santa Rosa, Alta Verapaz and Jutiapa was attacked by Salvadoran troops and emigrants from Guatemala. General Pedro Barillas, who commanded it, retreated violently and took favorable positions where he repelled the Salvadoran force Salvadoran Camilo Álvarez, a Salvadoran exile, was one of the army's commanders. The Guatemalan soldiers halted their advance when they arrived at the border. Meanwhile, Ezeta's army was busy crushing a rebellion in San Salvador, the nation's capital. After months of no combat and effective stalemate, diplomats signed a peace treaty on August 21, 1890.

Guatemalans called this the "Totoposte War", since it only served to mobilize ground corn grain (totoposte) to feed troops that never fought, which damaged the economy of the country.

== Interlude, 1895–1903 ==
In 1895, the leaders of El Salvador, Honduras, and Nicaragua met in Amapala and signed the Treaty of Amapala, establishing the Greater Republic of Central America. Guatemala was invited to join, but President José María Reina Barrios refused. The nation eventually was dissolved on 29 November 1898 after Tomás Regalado lead a coup in El Salvador against Rafael Antonio Gutiérrez.

== Second and Third Wars ==
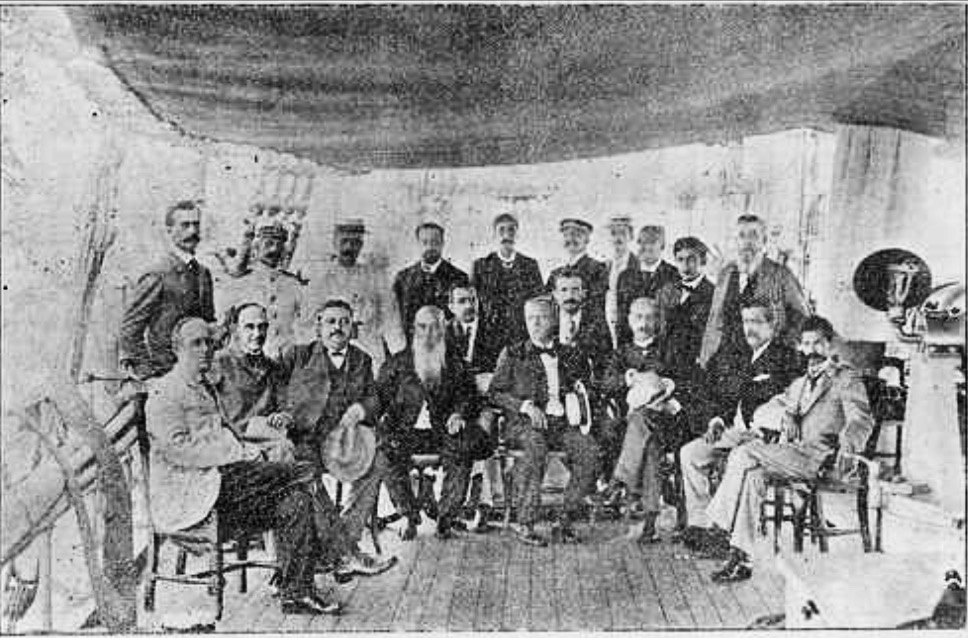
Signatories of the Treaty of Marblehead that ended the third war, 28 July 1906.

In 1902, the three nations again wished to reform the Greater Republic. The nation was supported by Mexican President Porfirio Díaz. Guatemala was invited to join, but President Manuel Estrada Cabrera refused. Many Guatemalans opposed Estrada Cabrera's presidency and had gone into exile in the three nations, notably former President Barillas Bercián.

In 1903, determined to create the nation by force, Salvadoran President Tomás Regalado declared war on Guatemala. Estrada Cabrera responded by mobilizing 55,000 soldiers, 40,000 to El Salvador and 15,000 to Mexico. After 84 days, the war ended with no military action being taken.

In 1906, Tomás Regalado declared war on Guatemala again with the consent of then President Pedro José Escalón and both El Salvador and Mexico invaded the country. The Salvadorans managed to capture Asunción Mita and Jutiapa while the Guatemalan Rebels under Manuel Lisandro Barillas captured Ayutla and Ocós. The Guatemalans eventually forced both forces to retreat. After two months, the war ended, but not before Tomás Regalado was killed in Guatemala on 7 July 1906. On July 14, Chiquimula's troops under Portillo and Calderón had attacked Tolo's Salvadoran positions, forcing them to concentrate at their headquarters in Ocotepeque. On that same day, at 2 p.m., the same Guatemalan troops took the Santa Fe positions, which the Salvadorans tried to retake by attacking their adversary from the front and flanks. The Salvadorans were driven back as far as the royal road. On the 16th, the Guatemalans occupied the heights of Machaca, from where they reported that the Salvadorans had tried to outflank them on the roads of La Brea and Quebrada Honda, but that, having received orders to suspend their operations, they had not continued their advance on the enemy positions.

== See also ==
- Greater Republic of Central America
- 1907 Central American Treaty of Peace and Amity
- 1923 Central American Treaty of Peace and Amity
