= Antonio Ezeta =

Vice President of El Salvador (1891–1894

General Antonio Ezeta
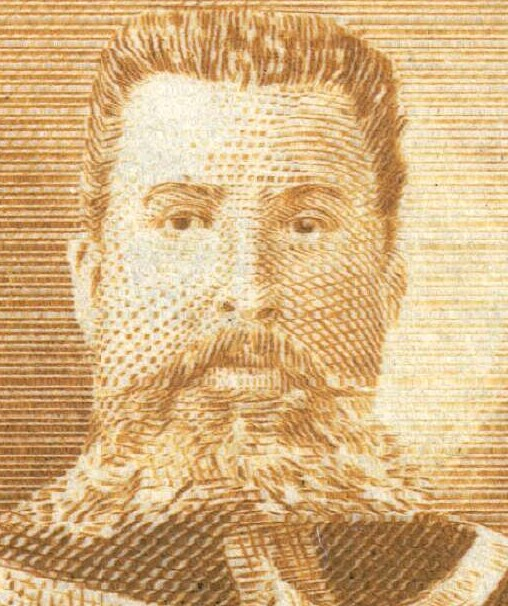
- Ezeta on a 1891 postage stamp

Acting President of El Salvador
- In office 4 June 1894 – 10 June 1894
- Preceded by: Carlos Ezeta
- Succeeded by: Rafael Antonio Gutiérrez

Vice President of El Salvador
- In office 1 March 1891 – 10 June 1894
- President: Carlos Ezeta
- Preceded by: Baltasar Estupinián
- Succeeded by: Prudencio Alfaro

13th Minister of War of El Salvador
- In office 1 January 1891 – 31 March 1891
- President: Carlos Ezeta
- Preceded by: Pedro José Escalón
- Succeeded by: Valentín Amaya

Commander-in-Chief of the Army
- In office 23 May 1894 – 10 June 1894
- President: Carlos Ezeta
- Preceded by: León Bolaños
- Succeeded by: Rafael Antonio Gutiérrez
- In office 1 March 1891 – 3 May 1894
- President: Carlos Ezeta
- Preceded by: Carlos Ezeta
- Succeeded by: León Bolaños

Personal details
- Born: Antonio Ezeta y León; El Salvador
- Died: Unknown
- Party: Liberal
- Relations: Carlos Ezeta (brother)
- Occupation: Military officer, politician

Military service
- Allegiance: El Salvador
- Branch/service: Salvadoran Army
- Years of service: ? – 1894
- Rank: General
- Commands: Salvadoran Army
- Battles/wars: First Totoposte War; Revolution of the 44 (WIA)

Antonio Ezeta y León was a Salvadoran military officer and politician who served as the country's vice president from 1891 until his overthrow in 1894. He fled to the United States where he avoided extradition and made a failed attempt to invade El Salvador.

== Rise to power ==
Antonio Ezeta y León's brother was Carlos Ezeta who overthrew President General Francisco Menéndez in June 1885. Ezeta commanded soldiers during the Totoposte War in July 1890. Ezeta was elected as his brother's vice president in the 1891 presidential election, assuming office on 1 March 1891. He was also appointed as commander-in-chief of the army.

== Revolution of the 44 ==
During the Revolution of the 44 of April to June 1894, Ezeta was injured by rebel forces on 3 May. He was replaced as commander-in-chief by General León Bolaños until 23 May when he recovered from his injuries. His brother fled the country on 4 June, upon which, he assumed office as acting president. He fled the country for the United States on 10 June, and General Rafael Antonio Gutiérrez became the country's provisional president.

Ezeta travelled to the US aboard the American warship Bennington. The new government, through minister Estanislao Pérez, attempted to halt his flight by appeal to U S Secretary of State Walter Q. Gresham for their extradition on charges of robbery, assassination and arson. Gresham refused on grounds that he did not recognise that a stable new government had formed and been recognised.

== Extradition and attempted return ==
By 2 July the new government had tried Ezeta in his absence and found him guilty and formally requested extradition. By August the Bennington had departed with Ezeta for San Francisco. Extradition was declined by the United States District Court for the Northern District of California on the grounds that the charges were judged to be political in nature which were excluded from the terms of the extradition treaty in place between the two countries.

Ezeta returned to El Salvador in January 1896, reportedly with 100 Mexican veterans and 60 Texan cowboys to attempt to restore himself to power. He failed to make a landing at San Salvador.

Political offices
Preceded by Baltasar Estupinián	Vice President of El Salvador; 1891–1894	Succeeded by Prudencio Alfaro
Preceded by Carlos Ezeta	Acting President of El Salvador; 1894	Succeeded by Rafael Antonio Gutiérrez
Military offices
Preceded by Carlos Ezeta	Commander-in-Chief of the Army; 1891–1894	Succeeded by León Bolaños
Preceded by León Bolaños	Commander-in-Chief of the Army; 1894	Succeeded by Rafael Antonio Gutiérrez
