= June 1876 Salvadoran presidential election =

- 4 June 1876
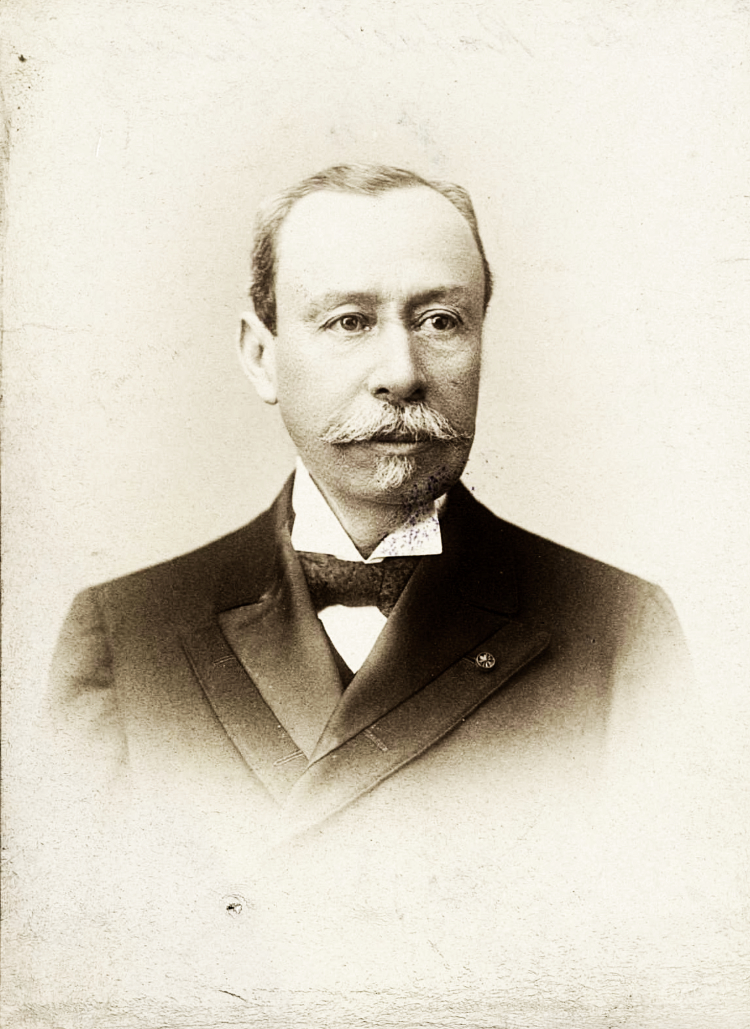
Candidate	Rafael Zaldívar
Party	Liberal
President before election
Rafael Zaldívar
Liberal
Elected President
Rafael Zaldívar
Liberal

Presidential elections were held in El Salvador on 4 June 1876. Rafael Zaldívar defeated Indalecio Miranda and was elected by the legislature.

== Results ==
Candidate	Party
Rafael Zaldívar	Liberal
Indalecio Miranda	Liberal
Total
Source: University of California, San Diego
