= 1887 Salvadoran presidential election =

- 9 January 1887
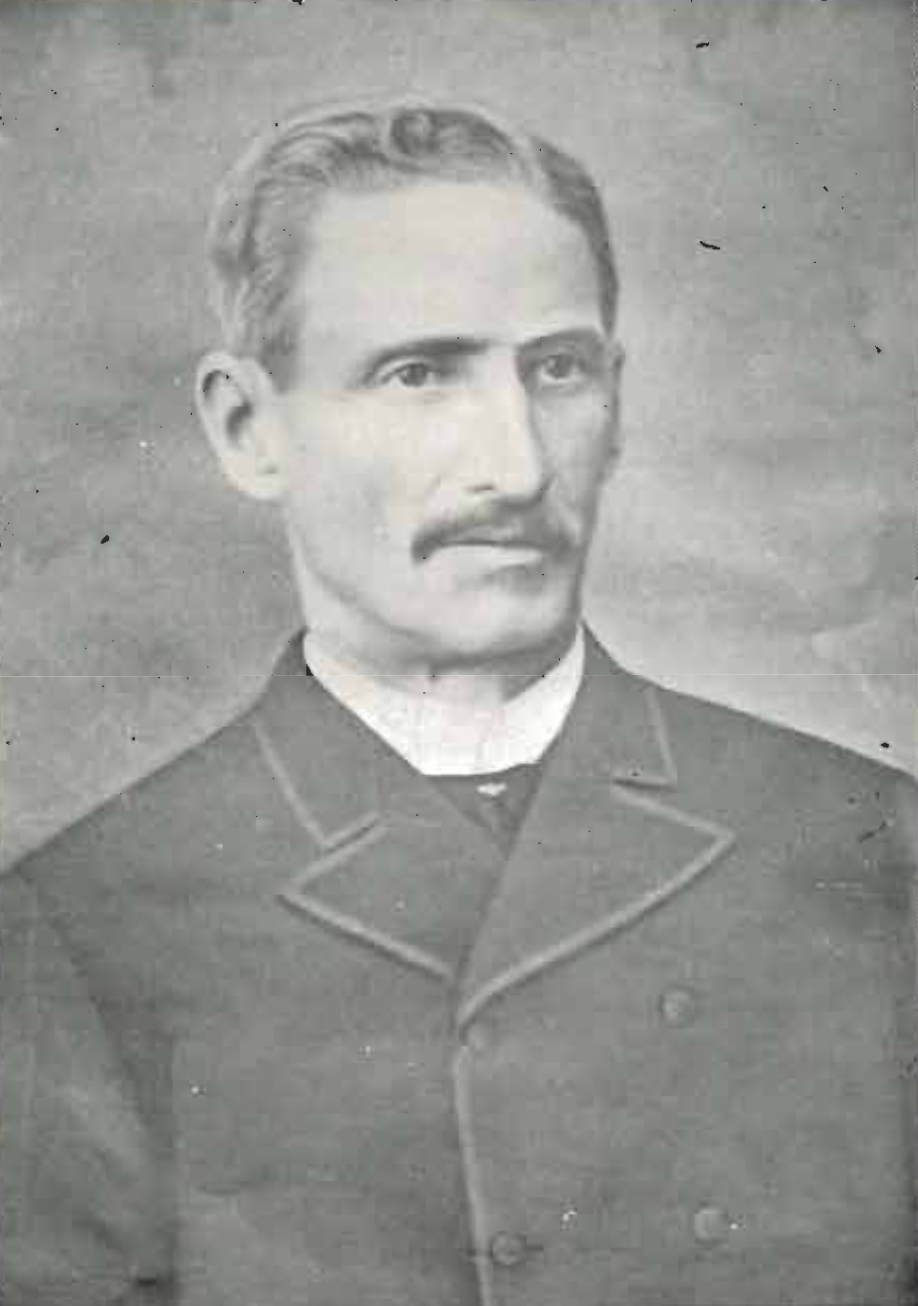
Candidate	Francisco Menéndez
Party	Liberal/Military
Running mate	Baltasar Estupinián
President before election
Francisco Menéndez
Liberal/Military
Elected President
Francisco Menéndez
Liberal/Military

Presidential elections were held in El Salvador on 9 January 1887. Provisional president General Francisco Menéndez was the only candidate. No results were posted.

== Results ==
Candidate	Party
Francisco Menéndez	Liberal/Military
Total
Source: University of California, San Diego
