= Francisco Menéndez =

President of El Salvador from 1885 to 1890

Divisional General Francisco Menéndez
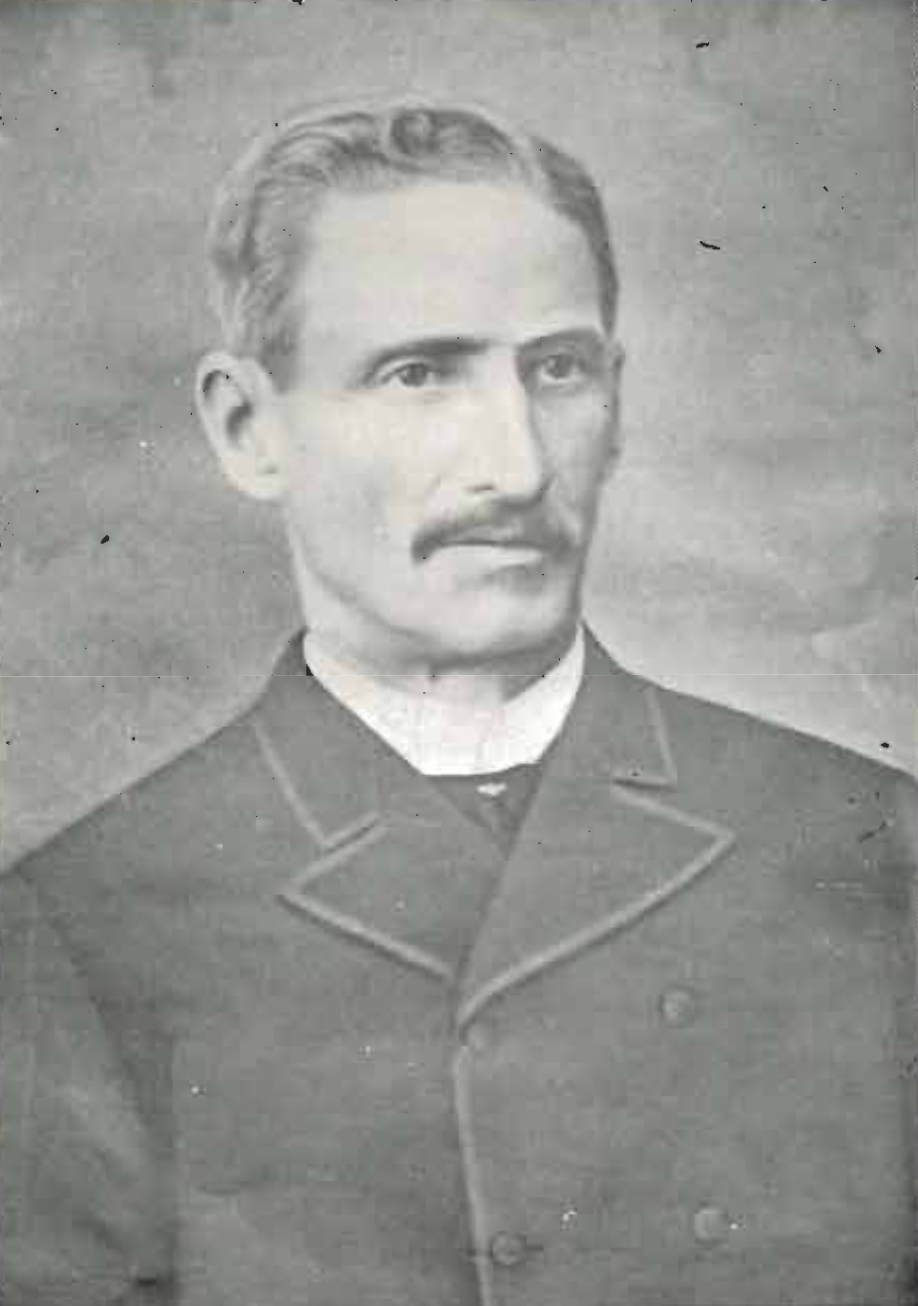
- Menéndez, c. 1885–1890

15th President of El Salvador
- In office 22 June 1885 – 22 June 1890; Provisional President until 1 March 1887
- Vice President: Vacant (until 1887); Baltasar Estupinián (1887); Vacant (from 1887)
- Preceded by: José Rosales (acting)
- Succeeded by: Carlos Ezeta

Deputy of the Constituent Assembly of El Salvador from Ahuachapán
- In office 1871

Mayor of Ahuachapán
- In office 1871

Personal details
- Born: Francisco Menéndez Valdivieso; 3 December 1830 Ahuachapán, Federal Republic of Central America
- Died: 22 June 1890 (aged 59) San Salvador, El Salvador
- Party: Liberal
- Spouse: Bonifacia Salazar (m. 1858)
- Occupation: Politician, military officer

Military service
- Allegiance: El Salvador
- Branch/service: Salvadoran Army
- Years of service: 1851–1890
- Rank: Divisional general
- Battles/wars: Battle of La Arada; Honduran–Salvadoran War; First Honduran intervention; Guatemalan–Salvadoran War; 1883 Salvadoran coup attempt; Menéndez's revolution; 1890 Salvadoran coup d'état †

Francisco Menéndez Valdivieso (3 December 1830 – 22 June 1890) was a Salvadoran politician and military officer who served as the 15th President of El Salvador from 1885 to his overthrow and death in 1890.

Menéndez enlisted in the Salvadoran Army in 1851 and became an officer in 1858. As mayor of Ahuachapán in 1871, he joined a liberal rebellion against conservative president Francisco Dueñas. Menéndez was promoted to divisional general under Marshal Santiago González's government. He launched a revolution against President Rafael Zaldívar and became provisional president on 22 June 1885. Menéndez was overthrown and killed in a coup led by General Carlos Ezeta five years later on 22 June 1890, as Ezeta wanted to succeed Menéndez as president.

== Early life ==
Francisco Menéndez Valdivieso was born on 3 December 1830 in Ahuachapán, El Salvador, then a part of the Federal Republic of Central America. His parents were wealthy landowners José Eustaquio Menéndez and Gabriela Valdivieso and Menéndez helped administer his family's wealthy by overseeing their lands dedicated to agriculture. His family in particular grew coffee. Menéndez was educated in Ahuachapán.

== Military career ==
Menéndez enlisted in the Salvadoran Army in 1851 at the age of 20. That year, he fought in the Salvadoran defeat at the Battle of La Arada as a corporal under the command of President Doroteo Vasconcelos. In 1858, he was promoted to sub-lieutenant and married Bonifacia Salazar. The couple had a son named José. That year, Menéndez was also a regidor on the Ahuachapán ayuntamiento.

He was the mayor of Ahuachapán in 1871. An idealist liberal, Menéndez joined Marshal Santiago González's rebellion against conservative president Francisco Dueñas. González elevated Menéndez to the rank of colonel and Menéndez established a defensive position at the Santa Ana hospital for four days amidst heavy canon fire. After the rebellion succeeded, González appointed Menéndez to the Constituent Assembly to draft a new constitution, but González abandoned this constitution the following year and adopted a new constitution that increased term lengths from two to four years.

Menéndez was the military commander of the Chalatenango Department during González's invasion of Honduras in 1872 where he protected the invasion force's rear. He was later promoted to brigadier general and became the governor of Ahuachapán Department. Menéndez recaptured the city of Apaneca in 1876 after a Guatemalan invasion, for which he was promoted to divisional general. Menéndez opposed the government of President Rafael Zaldívar who was installed by Guatemalan president Justo Rufino Barrios. After Menéndez participated in a failed coup led by General Manuel Estévez against Zaldívar's government, Menéndez fled El Salvador for Guatemala.

== Presidency ==
Barrios was killed at the Battle of Chalchuapa on 3 April 1885 when he attempted to forcibly reunite Central America by invading El Salvador. Menéndez, with the support of the new Guatemalan government, launched a revolution against Zaldívar. He resigned on 14 May and handed the presidency to General Fernando Figueroa, the second presidential designate, who served in a provisional capacity. Figueroa attempted to suppress the revolution, but he eventually resigned and fled El Salvador. Figueroa handed the presidency to Senator José Rosales on 18 June who served in an acting capacity, and he handed the presidency to Menéndez on 22 June when he entered San Salvador, El Salvador's capital city.

After the revolution, Menéndez appointed a cabinet consisting of Rafael Meza as Minister of External Relations, Justice, Public Instructions, and Worship; Manuel Gallardo as Minister of Finance and Public Credit; Jacinto Castellanos as Minister of Governance; Francisco Galindo as Minister of Promotion and Charity; and General Estanislao Pérez as Minister of War and the Navy.

As provisional president, Menéndez called the Constituent Assembly to draft a new constitution. The Constituent Assembly, which was mostly composed of Menéndez's opponents, drafted the 1885 constitution, but Menéndez refused it as it did not contain provisions that he desired. He dissolved the Constituent Assembly and held new elections the following year. This time, his allies in the new Constituent Assembly drafted the 1886 constitution. This constitution set presidential terms to 4 years, banned immediate re-election, and established a unicameral legislature. The 1886 constitution remains the longest lasting constitution in El Salvador's history, lasting 53 years until the 1939 constitution was adopted.

Menéndez won the 1887 presidential election. Baltasar Estupinián was elected as Menéndez's vice president. After Menéndez's inauguration, he made two cabinet changes: Gallardo was reassigned as Minister of Finance, and Rafael Ayala succeeded Gallardo as Minister of Governance. During Menéndez's presidency, he established the Telegraphy School, the National Library, and the Polytechnic School.

General José María Rivas, the governor of the Cuscatlán Department, rebelled against Menéndez's government in 1888 for refusing to appoint him as Estupinián's successor as vice president after he was forced to resigned for appearing to obstruct Menéndez's agenda. The rebellion failed, but Rivas maintained his governorship. In 1890, Rivas rebelled again when Menéndez refused to appoint him as Cuscatlán's military commander. The rebellion was suppressed and Rivas fled to Honduras. Later that year, Menéndez created the Junta of Notables to select his successor. Out of two dozen of Menéndez's allies, the junta selected Julio Interiano to succeed Menéndez. They then proceeded to prepare the country's election infrastructure to rig the 1891 presidential election in Interiano's favor.

== Overthrow and death ==
On 22 June 1890, General Carlos Ezeta led a coup d'état against Menéndez when his soldiers stormed the Presidential Palace during a banquet. Menéndez fought Ezeta's soldiers in the palace's garden with a sword. He died during the coup, either of a heart attack or cerebral hemorrhage. Menéndez's body was recovered by his nephew and he lay in state at the Plaza de Armas in downtown San Salvador. Menéndez was buried in the San Salvador General Cemetery.

Ezeta became provisional president after the coup, and in a victory speech, he declared that the 1885 Junta of Notables was "conspiratorial" because it excluded him; he wanted to be selected by the junta as Menéndez's successor. Ezeta won the 1891 presidential election virtually unanimously but he was overthrown in 1894 by General Rafael Antonio Gutiérrez, who supported Menéndez's 1885 coup.

Menéndez's adversaries accused him of embezzling public funds during his presidency. After Menéndez's death, a notary valued his personal wealth at 235,671 pesos. For establishing several educational institutions during his presidency, the Salvadoran government established Teacher's Day in 1928 and set its date as 22 June in Menéndez's honor.

== See also ==
- List of heads of state and government who died in office

Political offices
Preceded by José Rosales (acting)	President of El Salvador; 1885–1890	Succeeded by Carlos Ezeta
