= Revolution of the 44 =

1894 revolution in El Salvador

Date	29 April – 10 June 1894 (42 days)
Location	El Salvador
Result	Rebel victory: Carlos and Antonio Ezeta overthrown; Rafael Antonio Gutiérrez becomes provisional president

Belligerents
Salvadoran government	Anti-government rebels; Supported by: Guatemala; Honduras

Commanders and leaders
Carlos Ezeta; Antonio Ezeta (WIA); León Bolaños	Rafael Antonio Gutiérrez; Tomás Regalado

Strength
Unknown	5,500

Casualties and losses
2,000 killed; 5,000 wounded	Unknown

The Revolution of the 44 (Spanish: Revolución de los 44) was a military rebellion led by a group of Salvadoran generals and landowners, known as "the 44", against the government of President General Carlos Ezeta and Vice President General Antonio Ezeta.

The rebellion began in late-April 1894 when rebels captured the western Salvadoran city of Santa Ana, upon which, Ezeta declared a state of siege. By mid-June 1894, the rebels ousted the Ezeta brothers and installed General Rafael Antonio Gutiérrez as the country's provisional president.

== Background ==
On 22 June 1890, President General Francisco Menéndez was overthrown and killed in a coup d'état led by General Carlos Ezeta with the support of some indigenous Salvadorans. Carlos Ezeta overthrew Menéndez as, during the 1885 coup d'état against President Rafael Zaldívar in which Menéndez assumed the presidency, Carlos Ezeta (who was one of the coup's leaders) wanted the presidency for himself but did not receive it. After seizing the presidency, Carlos Ezeta blamed the "conspiratorial" junta of 1885 for excluding him from the presidency. Carlos Ezeta rewarded 32 military officers who supported his coup by granting them promotions.

The Guatemalan government refused to recognize Carlos Ezeta's government and declared war on El Salvador on 27 June 1890. Guatemalan forces and Salvadoran exiles under General Cayetano Sánchez clashed with Salvadoran forces under General Antonio Ezeta—Carlos Ezeta's brother—on 21 July outside of the Salvadoran city of Coatepeque, ending in a Guatemalan victory. Additionally, General José María Rivas, who had participated in several rebellions against several Salvadoran governments since the 1870s, rebelled against Carlos Ezeta and occupied the capital city San Salvador. Rivas was ultimately defeated and executed. The war between El Salvador and Guatemala ended with the signing of a peace treaty on 9 July 1890 on the condition that the Salvadoran people would be able to elect the country's president. Despite the peace treaty, Salvadoran and Guatemalan forces clashed again on 3 August near the town of Tempisque, ending in a Salvadoran victory.

During the 1891 presidential election, Carlos Ezeta won the presidency by a margin of 52,342 votes to 19 against. Antonio Ezeta was elected as vice president by a similar margin to the presidential election. The brothers assumed office on 1 March 1891 to serve a four year term, and Antonio Ezeta was appointed as the commander-in-chief of the Salvadoran Army.

== Revolution ==
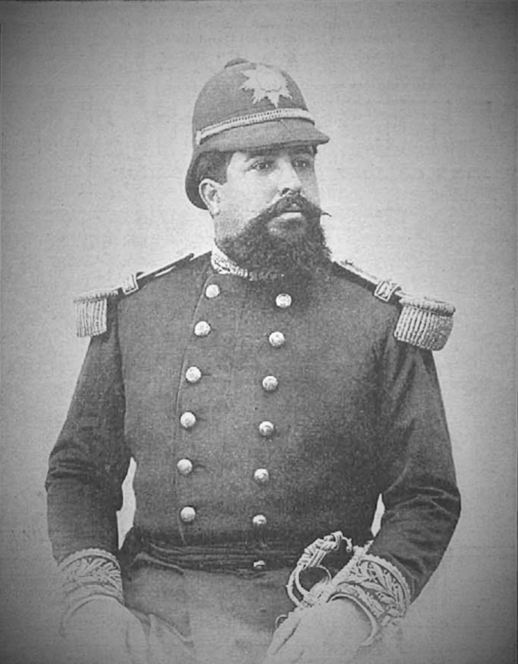
General Carlos Ezeta

On the morning of 29 April 1894, a group of rebels and landowners, known as "the 44", captured the western Salvadoran city of Santa Ana. The rebels, who had arrived from exile in Guatemala, captured the city's army barracks and forced Antonio Ezeta and General Jacinto Colocho, the barrack's commander, to flee the city to Coatepeque. In response to the rebellion, which numbered around 500 rebels and was supported by an additional 5,000 soldiers from Guatemala and Honduras, Carlos Ezeta invoked articles 4 and 91 of the constitution and declared a state of siege for twenty-nine days. In a public announcement issued through the Diario Oficial newspaper on the day the rebellion began, Carlos Ezeta stated:

Salvadorans: A seditious movement has just erupted in Santa Ana, that, although isolated and without elements to extend itself, it clearly reveals that the enemies of the fatherland do not rest in their ungrateful task to harm the country snatch the benefits of peace, that it has enjoyed until now. A treacherous hand, the eternal enemy of our autonomy, has given impulse to a handful of rebels, who promptly will be terribly chastened, because the wicked who want to bring the country the disgraces and calamities of a civil war do not deserve anything else. Salvadorans! I do not need more than a small force of our patriotism to annihilate the disturbers of order, and once again taste the autonomy and independence that El Salvador has conquered with many sacrifices, they are now indestructible, because the brilliant army that sustains it and the people will give everything until the last drop of blood in defense of that precious conquest, if necessary. Otherwise, tranquilly rest in that our Chief will know in any case how to fulfill his duty and always end all causes of disorder and anarchy.

— President General Carlos Ezeta, 29 April 1894

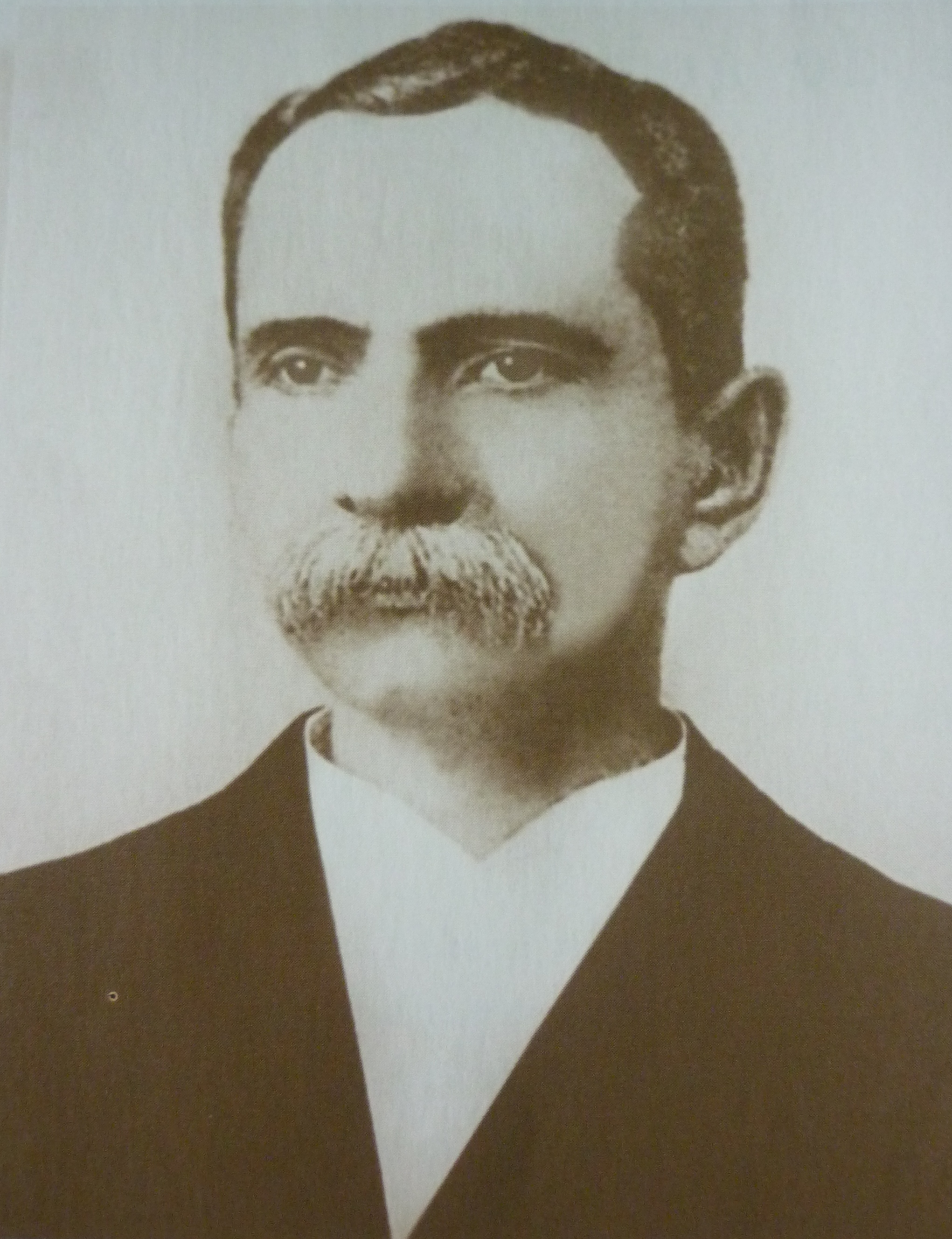
General Rafael Antonio Gutiérrez

On 1 May, General Rafael Antonio Gutiérrez, one of the rebellion's leaders, was proclaimed as the country's president in opposition to the Ezeta brothers' government. On 3 May, Antonio Ezeta was wounded by rebel forces, resulting in him being replaced as commander-in-chief of the army by General León Bolaños. On 5 May, while Carlos Ezeta was traveling to Santa Ana by train in command of an army of 1,000 soldiers, rebels derailed the train near the town of La Ceiba by ripping out the track's rivets on a bridge that crossed the Ateos river. He survived the derailment, as his carriage was specially designed to be stronger than the other carriages. The number of casualties is unknown. The rebels captured the Santa Ana Volcano and entered its crater on 8 May. Government forces under the command of General Joaquín López defeated rebel forces in the city of Chalchuapa on 11 May, forcing them to retreat back to Santa Ana. On 17 May, Brigadier General Luis Alonso Barahona captured the city of Chalatenango.

Antonio Ezeta reassumed the role of commander-in-chief on 23 May after recovering from his injuries.

As the rebels made advances towards San Salvador, Carlos Ezeta fled the country for Panama on 4 June, departing from the port of La Libertad. From there, he left for New York City and then Europe. Upon his brother's flight from the country, Antonio Ezeta assumed the presidency in an acting capacity and commanded his army to retreat to Santa Tecla on 5 June. By then, his army, which began with 1,700 soldiers, was reduced to a few hundred soldiers due to soldiers being killed, wounded, or deserting. The United States had dispatched the USS Bennington to the port of La Libertad to protect the interests of U.S. citizens in the country, where Antonio Ezeta and sixteen other generals requested asylum. After both Ezeta brothers had fled the country, Gutiérrez marched into San Salvador on 10 June and officially assumed office as provisional president. The new government requested the extradition of those who fled the country to the United States, but the U.S. government refused to extradite them; the U.S. would not recognize Gutiérrez's presidency until 3 August.

== Aftermath ==
Gutiérrez served as president in a provisional capacity until his inauguration on 1 March 1895 after he was elected through a rigged presidential election, in which he was the only candidate, in January of that year. He received 61,080 votes to only 91 against, or 99.85 percent. Prudencio Alfaro was elected as his vice president, winning 38,006 votes, or 62.51 percent. Similar to Carlos Ezeta in 1890, General Tomás Regalado overthrew Gutiérrez in November 1898 and became the country's provisional president as he believed that he would receive the presidency following the Revolution of the 44. Regalado eventually legitimized his presidency through the 1899 presidential election. The city of Santa Ana was nicknamed "The Heroic City" by the revolution's leaders after assuming power.

In an interview with The New York Times in July 1894, Carlos Ezeta stated that he would not seek to regain power. He added, "the revolution was planned by refugee Salvadorans and won with the support of Guatemala". His wife, four children, and three servants joined him in exile. He was accused of bringing USD$3 million with him to the United States, to which he responded, "I wish I had it".

Salvadoran poet and writer Roque Dalton criticized the revolution in his 1972 book Miguel Mármol. Dalton described the rebels as a "reactionary mob" and as "44 rich good-for-nothings and 44 traitors and 44 sons of bitches". He added, "in spite of everything, the Ezeta government was more for the people, while [the government] of the 44 was fundamentally an enemy of the people", citing a period of economic downturn during Gutiérrez's presidency.

== See also ==
- List of Salvadoran coups d'état
