= 1891 Salvadoran presidential election =

- January 1891
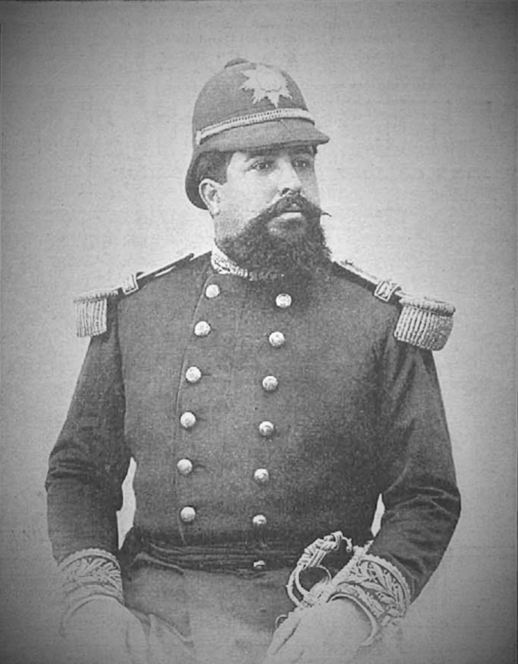
Candidate	Carlos Ezeta
Party	Liberal/Military
Running mate	Antonio Ezeta
Popular vote	52,342
Percentage	99.96%
President before election
Carlos Ezeta
Liberal/Military
Elected President
Carlos Ezeta
Liberal/Military

Presidential elections were held in El Salvador in January 1891. General Carlos Ezeta was the only candidate and was elected with only 19 votes against; his brother, Antonio Ezeta, was elected as his vice president.

== Results ==
Candidate	Party	Votes	%
Carlos Ezeta	Liberal/Military	52,342	99.96
Against		19	0.04
Total		52,361	100.00
Source: Source: Ching 1997, p. 180
