= First Guatemalan–Salvadoran intervention in Honduras =

Date	May–July 1872
Location	Honduras
Result	Allied victory

Combatants
El Salvador; Guatemala (Honduras) Honduran rebels	Honduras

Commanders and leaders
(El Salvador) Santiago González (Guatemala) Miguel García Granados (Honduras) Celeo Arias	(Honduras) José María Medina (POW)

The first Guatemalan–Salvadoran intervention in Honduras was a military conflict between the allied forces of Guatemala and El Salvador against Honduras in 1872.

== Conflict ==
To counter the conservative threat to the governments of Guatemala and El Salvador, they decided to wage war against General Medina. Three Salvadoran army columns invaded Honduras: one led by General Miguel Espinosa via Nacaome, defeating the Hondurans at Sabana Grande (May 5) and occupying Tegucigalpa on May 9. The second, commanded by General Ricardo Streber, invaded the Gulf of Fonseca, capturing the Port of Amapala on May 8. The third, under President González via Chalatenango, ousted General Medina from Gracias on May 22. González established a Provisional Government there, led by Licenciado Céleo Arias.

Guatemala's president, accepting the state of war with Honduras since May 8, delegated power to Brigadier Justo Rufino Barrios and led troops to the Honduran border. A Guatemalan column, led by General Gregorio Solares, joined the Salvadoran army in Gracias. After being repelled from Comayagua on May 27, President Medina retreated to Trujillo, then embarked for Omoa. Despite further defeats in Santa Cruz (July 12) and Santa Bárbara (July 26), Medina was eventually captured on July 28. Licenciado Céleo Arias was recognized as the Provisional President of Honduras.
