= Idealism in international relations =

School of thought

In foreign policy and international relations, idealism holds that a nation-state should make its internal political philosophy the goal of its conduct and rhetoric in international affairs. For example, an idealist might believe that ending poverty at home should be coupled with tackling poverty abroad. Both within and outside of the United States, American president Woodrow Wilson is widely considered an early advocate of idealism and codifier of its practical meaning; specific actions cited include the issuing of the famous Fourteen Points.

Wilson's idealism was a precursor to liberal international relations theory, the particular set of viewpoints arising amongst the so-called "institution builders" after World War II. Organizations that came about as a direct result of the war's outcome include the International Monetary Fund (IMF) and the United Nations (UN) among others.

In the broader, philosophical sense, this internationally minded viewpoint can be thought of as an extension of the moral idealism advocated by different thinkers during and after the Age of Enlightenment. That particular era involved multiple prominent individuals promoting a general sense of benevolence and government based upon strong personal character, with international conflict criticized as against the principles of reason.

More generally, academic Michael W. Doyle has described idealism as based on the belief that other nations' stated positive intentions can be relied on, whereas realism holds that said intentions are in the long run subject to the security dilemma described by thinker John H. Herz. Although realism in the context of foreign affairs is traditionally seen as the opposite of idealism, numerous scholars and individual leaders in charge of different nations have sought to synthesize the two schools of thought.

Scholar Hedley Bull has written:

By the 'idealists' we have in mind writers such as Sir Alfred Zimmern, S. H. Bailey, Philip Noel-Baker, and David Mitrany in the United Kingdom, and James T. Shotwell, Pitman Potter, and Parker T. Moon in the United States. ... The distinctive characteristic of these writers was their belief in progress: the belief, in particular, that the system of international relations that had given rise to the First World War was capable of being transformed into a fundamentally more peaceful and just world order; that under the impact of the awakening of democracy, the growth of 'the international mind', the development of the League of Nations, the good works of men of peace or the enlightenment spread by their own teaching, it was in fact being transformed; and that their responsibility as students of international relations was to assist this march of progress to overcome the ignorance, the prejudices, the ill-will, and the sinister interests that stood in its way.

== History ==
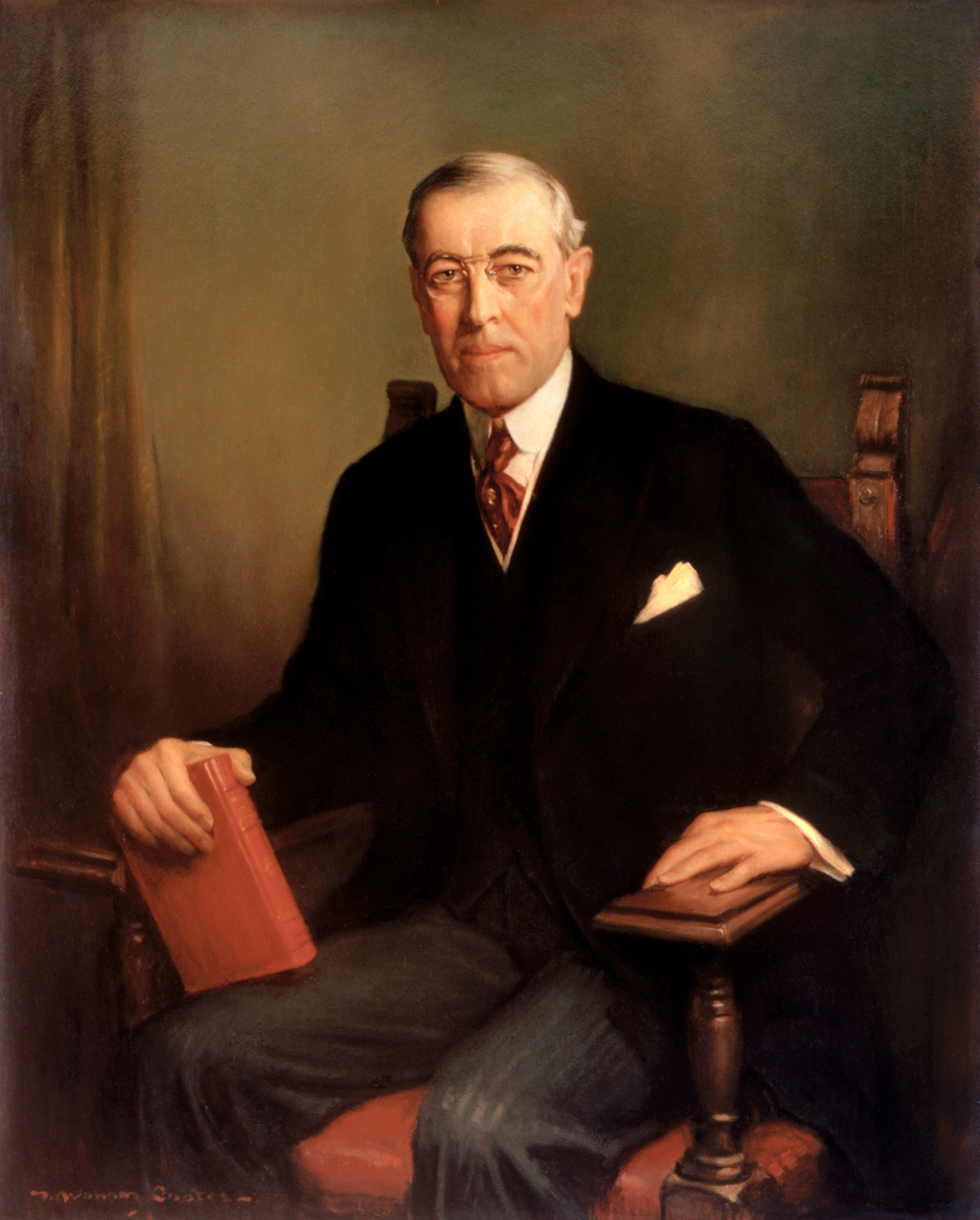
American president Woodrow Wilson is widely considered one of the codifying figures of idealism in the foreign policy context.

Since the 1880s, there has been growing study of the major writers of this idealist tradition of thought in international relations, including Sir Alfred Zimmern, Norman Angell, John Maynard Keynes, John A. Hobson, Leonard Woolf, Gilbert Murray, Florence Stawell (known as Melian Stawell), Philip Henry Kerr, 11th Marquess of Lothian, Arnold J. Toynbee, Lester Pearson and David Davies.

Much of this writing has contrasted these idealist writers with 'realists' in the tradition of E. H. Carr, whose The Twenty Years' Crisis (1939) both coined the term 'idealist' and was a fierce and effective assault on the inter-war idealists. Idealism is centered on the notion that states are rational actors capable of ensuring lasting peace and security rather than resorting to war.

Idealism is also marked by the prominent role played by international law and international organizations in its conception of policy formation. One of the most well-known tenets of modern idealist thinking is democratic peace theory, which holds that states with similar modes of democratic governance do not fight one another. Wilson's idealistic thought was embodied in his Fourteen Points speech, and in the creation of the League of Nations.

Idealism transcends the left-right political spectrum. Idealists can include both human rights campaigners (advocates for a cause traditionally, but not always, associated with the left) and promoters of American neoconservatism, with the latter ideological movement usually associated with the right.

Idealism may find itself in opposition to realism, a worldview which argues that a nation's national interest is more important than ethical or moral considerations; however, there need be no conflict between the two (see Neoconservatism for an example of a confluence of the two). Realist thinkers include Hans Morgenthau, Niccolò Machiavelli, Otto von Bismarck, George F. Kennan and others. Recent practitioners of Idealism in the United States have included Ronald Reagan and George W. Bush.

Arthur Link finds that Wilson from his earliest days had imbibed the beliefs of his denomination – in the omnipotence of God, the morality of the Universe, a system of rewards and punishments and the notion that nations, as well as man, transgressed the laws of God at their peril. Blum (1956) argues that Wilson developed a mystic conviction in the superiority of Anglo-Saxons, and in their righteous duty to make the world over in their image, from William Ewart Gladstone. Moral principle, constitutionalism, and faith in God were among the prerequisites for alleviating human strife. While he interpreted international law within such a brittle, moral cast, Wilson remained remarkably insensitive to new and changing social forces and conditions of the 20th century. He expected too much justice in a morally brutal world which disregarded the self-righteous resolutions of parliaments and statesmen like himself. Wilson's triumph was as a teacher of international morality to generations yet unborn. Daniel Patrick Moynihan sees Wilson's vision of world order anticipated humanity prevailing through the "Holy Ghost of Reason," a vision which rested on religious faith.

Wilson's views were based on the future welfare of humankind. He called for a world made safe democracy, this was organized around political, economic and social standards. These principles were stated in his 14-point peace program. Wilson thought of this program as an American commitment to show man kind the way of liberty. The core of Wilson's program was a League of Nations committed to peace, and bringing down tyranny which was thought to be the root of war. The idea was that if democracy could be widespread peace and prosperity would prevail.

Wilson's diplomatic policies had a profound influence on shaping the world. Diplomatic historian Walter Russell Mead has explained:

Wilson's principles survived the eclipse of the Versailles system and they still guide European politics today: self-determination, democratic government, collective security, international law, and a league of nations. Wilson may not have gotten everything he wanted at Versailles, and his treaty was never ratified by the Senate, but his vision and his diplomacy, for better or worse, set the tone for the twentieth century. France, Germany, Italy, and Britain may have sneered at Wilson, but every one of these powers today conducts its European policy along Wilsonian lines. What was once dismissed as visionary is now accepted as fundamental. This was no mean achievement, and no European statesman of the twentieth century has had as lasting, as benign, or as widespread an influence.

American foreign relations since 1914 have rested on Wilsonian idealism, says historian David Kennedy, even if adjusted somewhat by the "realism" represented by Franklin Delano Roosevelt and Henry Kissinger. Kennedy argues that every president since Wilson has "embraced the core precepts of Wilsonianism. Nixon himself hung Wilson's portrait in the White House Cabinet Room. Wilson's ideas continue to dominate American foreign policy in the twenty-first century. In the aftermath of 9/11 they have, if anything, taken on even greater vitality."

According to revisionist narrative, there was never a single 'great debate' between idealism and realism. Lucian M. Ashworth argues, the persistence of the notion that there was a real debate between idealism and realism, says less about the actual discussions of the time, and more about the marginalisation of liberal and normative thinking in the international relations in the post-war period. Richard Devetak wrote in his international relations textbook:

The structure of Carr’s masterpiece revolves around the dichotomy between realism and liberalism. In fact, he helped create the impression that the newly established discipline was dominated by a debate between realism and liberalism. This subsequently became known as the ‘first great debate’, although – as Andreas Osiander (1998), Peter Wilson (1998), Lucian Ashworth (1999), and Quirk and Vigneswaran (2005) have shown – no debate actually occurred, if by that we mean a series of exchanges between realists and liberals. Indeed, recent work suggests that the very idea of narrating the discipline’s history as a series of ‘great debates’ is questionable. Even so, it is important for students to learn and appreciate the stories the discipline has told about itself, which is why I persist with the narrative.

== Descendant theories ==
Idealism proper has been argued to be a relatively short-lived school of thought, and advocates particularly suffered a crisis of confidence following the failure of the League of Nations and the outbreak of World War II. However, subsequent theories of international relations have significantly drawn elements from Wilsonian-style idealism when constructing their world views. In addition, scholars describing themselves either as idealists or as sympathetic to the school of thought have remained active in international relations studies.

=== Liberalism ===
Liberalism manifested as a tempered version of Wilson's idealism in the wake of World War II. Cognizant of the failures of idealism to prevent renewed isolationism following World War I in certain areas, and its inability to manage the balance of power in Europe to prevent the outbreak of a new war, liberal thinkers devised a set of international institutions based on rule of law and regularized interaction. These international organizations, such as the United Nations and the NATO, or even international regimes such as the Bretton Woods system, and General Agreement on Tariffs and Trade (GATT), were calculated both to maintain a balance of power as well as regularize cooperation between nations.

=== Neoconservatism ===
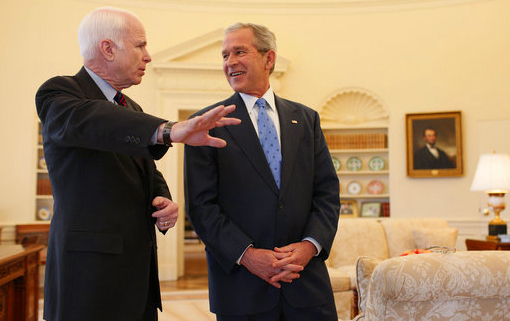
American president George W. Bush (right) and Senator John McCain (left), pictured meeting at the White House in March 2008, have both been known as prominent neoconservatives.

Neoconservatism has drawn from historical liberalism its intense focus on the promotion of "universal values", in this case democracy, human rights, free trade, women's rights and minority protections. However, it differs in that it is less wedded to the importance of preserving international institutions and treaties while pursuing assertive or aggressive stances which it deems morally worthy, and is willing to use force or the threat of force, unilaterally if necessary, to push for its goals.

== See also ==
- Ethical idealism
- Liberal internationalism
- "New world order"
- Straussian idealism
- Realism (international relations)
