= Rafael Antonio Gutiérrez =

President of El Salvador from 1894 to 1898

General Rafael Antonio Gutiérrez
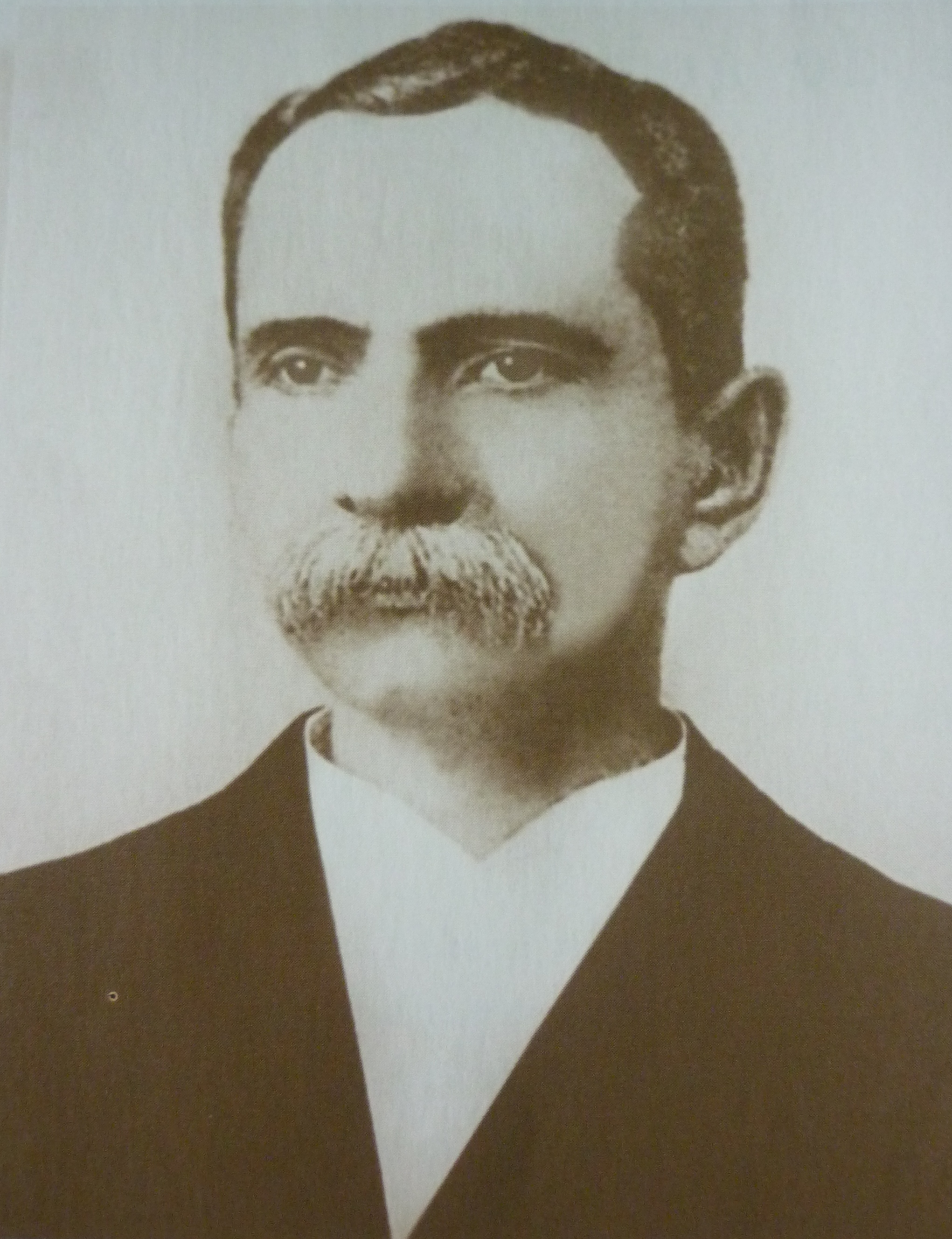

17th President of El Salvador
- In office 10 June 1894 – 13 November 1898; Provisional: 10 June 1894 – 1 March 1895
- Vice President: Prudencio Alfaro (1895–1898)
- Preceded by: Carlos Ezeta
- Succeeded by: Tomás Regalado

Personal details
- Born: 24 October 1845 Ilobasco, El Salvador
- Died: 9 January 1921 (aged 75) San Salvador, El Salvador
- Party: Liberal
- Spouse: Carlota Mejía
- Children: 8
- Parent: Marcela Gutiérrez (mother)
- Occupation: Military officer, politician

Military service
- Allegiance: El Salvador
- Branch/service: Salvadoran Army
- Years of service: ? – 1894
- Rank: General
- Battles/wars: Menéndez's revolution; Revolution of the 44

Rafael Antonio Gutiérrez (24 October 1845 – 9 January 1921) was the 17th president of El Salvador from 10 June 1894 to 13 November 1898. He was a leader of the Revolution of the 44 which overthrew President General Carlos Ezeta from April to June 1894. Gutiérrez served as provisional president until he was officially inaugurated in March 1895 after his victory in the 1895 presidential election, in which he was the only candidate.

During his four-year presidency, Gutiérrez settled land disputes, attempted to combat an economic crisis, and was a key figure in the foundation of the short-lived Greater Republic of Central America. He was overthrown on 13 November 1898 by General Tomás Regalado. Gutiérrez's overthrow subsequently lead to a revolt in Izalco the following day and the dissolution of the Greater Republic of Central America on 29 November 1898.

== Early and personal life ==
Rafael Antonio Gutiérrez was born in Ilobasco, Cabañas, El Salvador, on 24 October 1845. His father was a Spaniard and his mother was Marcela Gutiérrez. He married Carlota Mejía and they had eight children: Rafael Antonio, Carlos, Carlota, Tulio, Marcela, Rosa, Bernardo, and María. His daughter Marcela married a son of Fernando Figueroa, another Salvadoran general who served as president of El Salvador provisionally in 1885 and officially from 1907 to 1911. Gutiérrez was an idealist liberal.

In May 1885, Gutiérrez supported Divisional General Francisco Menéndez in a revolution which overthrew President Rafael Zaldívar and installed Menéndez as president of El Salvador. During the coup, Gutiérrez led indigenous Salvadoran soldiers in Nahuizalco.

== Presidency ==
=== Rise to power ===
On 29 April 1894, Gutiérrez, along with several other military officers, began a rebellion against President Carlos Ezeta, a pragmatic reformist, who had allowed a financial crisis to arise. With assistance from Guatemala, Honduras, and Nicaragua, Ezeta was overthrown on 9 June 1894 in what is known as the Revolution of the 44.

After a rivalry and struggle with General Manuel Rivas for the presidency, in which Rivas conceded to Gutiérrez, he became provisional president of the nation on 10 June 1894. He officially became the president of El Salvador on 1 March 1895 following the 1895 presidential election, in which he was the only candidate and won 61,080 votes. The election for vice president was contested between Prudencio Alfaro, Carlos Meléndez, and four other minor candidates, in which Alfaro defeated Meléndez with 38,006 votes compared to Meléndez's 18,792 votes and the minor candidates' approximately 4,000 votes. Gutiérrez repealed several taxes Ezeta had put into effect to combat the financial crisis, and later, Ezeta attempted to retake power in 1895 but his attempt failed.

=== Izalco land disputes ===
On 1 June 1895, Simeón Morán, a partidor, and 150 comuneros signed a petition to Gutiérrez to allow the indigenous community of Asunción to take more time in partitioning their land to Dolores, requested a surveyor to assist in the partition, and requested that the local governor nullifies partitions in Rincón del Tigre. A separate petition, signed by 120 comuneros, stated that Luciano Argueta, another partidor, had the actual authority over the land being partitioned and requested him to be the surveyor, as he had been an administrator since 1890. The system of partidores and comuneros on Izalco land was established in 1881 and 1882 under President Rafael Zaldívar in an attempt to "stimulate investment in commercial agriculture" and "create a class of entrepreneurial peasants and farmers," but the system took land away from Izalco indigenous people which caused tensions.

Morán filed two complaints against Argueta accusing him of selling land in 1896, with the second complaint specifying that he sold 180 hectares (440 acres) of land to Abrahám Castillo Mora, a military officer, and 22 hectares (54 acres) of land to Eliseo Godines, a local judge. In 1897, Gutiérrez decreed that Morán's partition was invalid and he was removed as a partidor. He was later jailed for several illegal actions he carried out between 1881 and 1886.

Sometime during Gutiérrez's presidency, he abolished the country's police force, however, he later was forced to reestablish it.

=== Economic crisis and the University of El Salvador ===
Gutiérrez supported and was directly involved in the management of the University of El Salvador (UES). He revived the University Council that was abolished during Ezeta's presidency. El Salvador faced an economic crisis in 1897. In response, Gutiérrez took "extreme fiscal policies" to combat the crisis. Those policies included the construction of a railroad from San Miguel to La Unión and another from San Salvador to Nejapa. Prior to the crisis, he had also constructed a rail line from Ateos to La Joya in 1895 and from La Joya to Santa Ana in 1896. His policies, however, were unpopular, and his government was blamed for the poor handling of the crisis.

He faced protests from university students because of the economic crisis, and as a result, he had the university expel any students who spoke out against him or university officials. On 28 September 1898, he issued a decree that would grant the university more autonomy from the government and was signed by Minister of Public Instruction Francisco Gavidia, but the bill never went into effect.

=== Central American union and overthrow ===
Gutiérrez was a supporter of a Central American union and signed the Pact of Amapala with Honduras and Nicaragua on 20 June 1895 which established the Greater Republic of Central America. The union did not last long, however, as he was overthrown in a coup d'état led by General Tomás Regalado, a pragmatic liberal who had helped him rise to power in 1894, on 13 November 1898. Regalado overthrew Gutiérrez as he intended to rig the upcoming presidential election so that he could continue serving as president. Gutiérrez and some supporters fled to Honduras, and the 1898 coup was the last where a political rival deposed El Salvador's incumbent president.

The day following Gutiérrez's overthrow, Indians in Izalco staged a revolt against the Salvadoran government. The overthrow of Gutiérrez eventually lead to the collapse of the Greater Republic of Central America on 29 November 1898.

== Later life and death ==
Gutiérrez stood for election for the presidency in 1907 but received only one vote. Gutiérrez died on 9 January 1921, aged 75, at 10:00 p.m. in Barrio San Jacinto, San Salvador, El Salvador. He was buried the following day at the Cemetery of Distinguished Citizens with full honors and President Jorge Meléndez declared three days of national mourning.

== Electoral history ==
Year	Office	Type	Party	Main opponent	Party	Votes for Gutiérrez				Result	Swing
Year	Office	Type	Party	Main opponent	Party	Total	%	P.	±%	Result	Swing
1895	President of El Salvador	General	Liberal	"Against"		61,080	99.85	1st	N/A	Won	Hold
1907	President of El Salvador	General	Liberal	Fernando Figueroa	Liberal	1	0.00	9th	–99.85	Lost	Hold

== See also ==
- Policarpo Bonilla – President of Honduras who helped form the Greater Republic of Central America
- José Santos Zelaya – President of Nicaragua who helped form the Greater Republic of Central America

Political offices
Preceded by Carlos Ezeta	President of El Salvador; 1894–1898	Succeeded by Tomás Regalado
