= Carlos Ezeta =

President of El Salvador from 1890 to 1894

General Carlos Ezeta
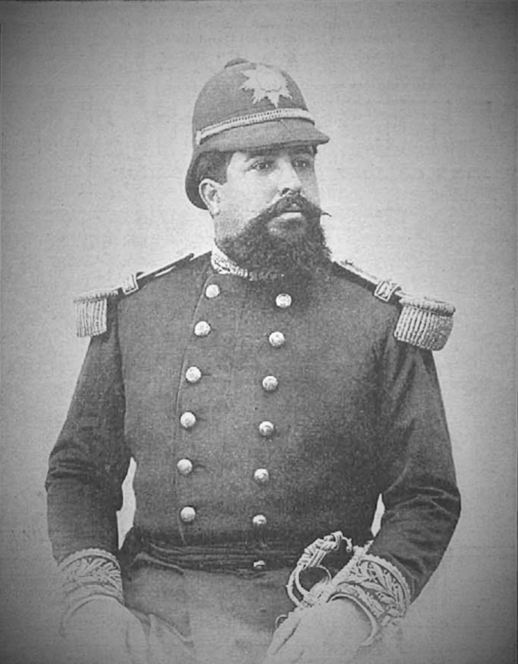

16th President of El Salvador
- In office 22 June 1890 – 10 June 1894; Provisional: 22 June 1890 – 1 March 1891
- Vice President: Antonio Ezeta (1891–1894)
- Preceded by: Francisco Menéndez
- Succeeded by: Rafael Antonio Gutiérrez

Personal details
- Born: 14 June 1852 San Salvador, El Salvador
- Died: 21 March 1903 (aged 50) Mazatlán, Mexico
- Party: Liberal
- Spouse: Josefa Marroquín
- Children: 4
- Relatives: Antonio Ezeta (brother)
- Profession: Military

Military service
- Allegiance: El Salvador
- Branch/service: Salvadoran Army
- Years of service: 1872–1894
- Rank: General
- Battles/wars: Barrios' War of Reunification; First Totoposte War; Revolution of the 44

Carlos Basilio Ezeta y León (14 June 1852 – 21 March 1903) was the 16th President of El Salvador from 22 June 1890 to 9 June 1894, when he was overthrown in the Revolution of the 44. He was a military ruler. He died on 21 March 1903, aged 50.

== Early life ==
Carlos Ezeta was born in San Salvador, El Salvador, on 14 June 1852. His father was General Eligió Ezeta and his mother was Asunción de León Corleto, and he had a younger brother, Antonio Ezeta. He married Josefa Marroquín and had four children: Carlota, Matilde, Emilia, and Asunción.

== Military service ==
Ezeta served in the Salvadoran Army during Santiago González's and Fernando Figueroa's invasions of Honduras in 1872 and 1873. During his service, he was injured in battle in Santa Bárbara. He lived in Costa Rica in 1875, returned to El Salvador in 1876, and later visited the United States and Guatemala. He returned to El Salvador in 1885 to fight against Guatemala in Barrios' War of Reunification and fought in the Battle of Chalchuapa.

== Presidency ==
On 22 June 1890, Ezeta travelled to the White House of the incumbent President, General Francisco Menéndez, and started an uprising that overthrew Menéndez during which he died. On 1 March 1891, Ezeta formally took office as the President of El Salvador after winning the 1891 Salvadoran presidential election.

Ezeta oversaw El Salvador's relative political stability at a time when the neighboring republics of Honduras and Guatemala were at war, but he soon lost favor with the landowners and was overthrown in the Revolution of the 44 on 9 June 1894 by Rafael Antonio Gutiérrez with assistance from Nicaragua, Guatemala and Honduras.

== Later life and death ==
He fled to Panama, and then travelled to Europe as there was a warrant for his death; he then returned to Central America and then settled in Mazatlán, Mexico, where he died on 21 March 1903, aged 50. His remains are buried at Angela Peralta Cemetery in Mazatlán.

Political offices
Preceded by Francisco Menéndez	President of El Salvador; 1890–1894	Succeeded by Rafael Antonio Gutiérrez
