= Rafael Zaldívar =

President of El Salvador (1876–1885)

Doctor Rafael Zaldívar
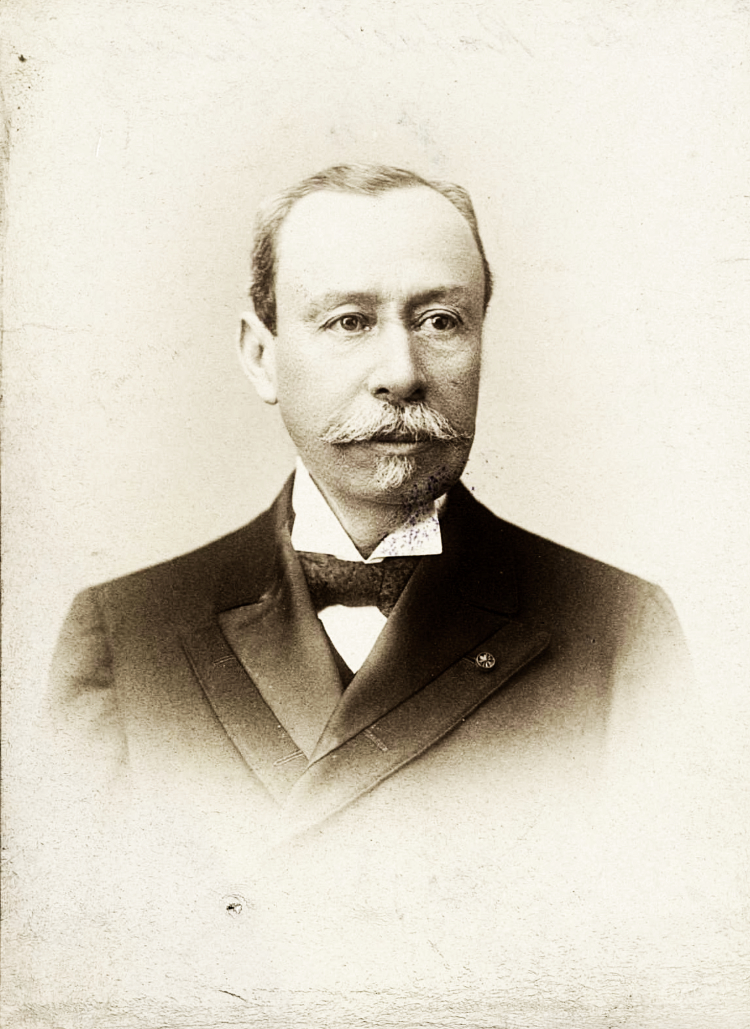
- Zaldívar in c. 1902

14th President of El Salvador
- In office 21 August 1884 – 14 May 1885
- Vice President: Ángel Guirola
- Preceded by: Ángel Guirola (acting)
- Succeeded by: Fernando Figueroa (provisional)
- In office 1 May 1876 – 6 April 1884; Provisional President until 1 February 1880
- Vice President: Vacant (until 1884); Ángel Guirola (from 1884)
- Preceded by: Andrés del Valle
- Succeeded by: Ángel Guirola (acting)

8th Minister of War and Public Instruction of El Salvador
- In office 1 February 1871 – 12 April 1871
- President: Francisco Dueñas
- Preceded by: Juan Delgado
- Succeeded by: Fabio Morán

25th President of the Legislative Assembly of El Salvador
- In office 15 January 1870 – 12 February 1870
- Preceded by: Ireneo Chacón
- Succeeded by: Rafael Campo

Personal details
- Born: Rafael Zaldívar Lazo; 24 October 1837 San Alejo, Federal Republic of Central America
- Died: 2 March 1903 (aged 65) Paris, France
- Party: Liberal
- Spouse: Sara Guerra (m. 1858)
- Children: 4
- Education: National College of Asunción; University of El Salvador; University of San Carlos; University of Paris
- Occupation: Politician, diplomat, physician

Rafael Zaldívar Lazo (24 October 1837 – 2 March 1903) was a Salvadoran politician, diplomat, and physician who served as the 14th President of El Salvador from 1876 to 1884 and from 1884 to 1885.

== Early life and education ==
Rafael Zaldívar Lazo was born on 24 October 1837 in San Alejo, El Salvador, then a part of the Federal Republic of Central America. His parents were Apolonio Zaldívar and Antonia Lazo. Zaldívar had three brothers: Francisco, José, and Fermín. At a young age, Zaldívar was tutored in Tecapa by José Miguel Alegría, a presbyter and a deputy of the Legislative Assembly of El Salvador. Alegría tutored Zaldívar in humanities, Latin, and Classical literature.

Before 1852, Zaldívar graduated from the National College of Asunción as a Bachelor of Science and a Bachelor of Arts. In 1852, he enrolled in the Faculty of Medicine at the University of El Salvador. After an April 1854 earthquake destroyed the University of El Salvador, Zaldívar transferred to the University of San Carlos in Guatemala City where he completed his doctorate of medicine on 23 May 1860. He later moved to France and studied obstetrics at the University of Paris.

== Diplomatic career ==
After Zaldívar returned to Central America, he was appointed as El Salvador's envoy extraordinary and minister plenipotentiary to Guatemala, a post he held until December 1865. In January 1866, he became the vice rector of the University of El Salvador's Faculty of Medicine. In 1867, Zaldívar was a member of the Public Instruction Council and was appointed as the Protomedic of the Nation. In 1869, Zaldívar was the minister plenipotentiary to the Kingdom of Prussia. Zaldívar served as the president of the Legislative Assembly from 15 January to 12 February 1870. In 1871, Zaldívar was Minister of War and Public Instruction under President Francisco Dueñas.

After Dueñas was overthrown by Marshal Santiago González in 1871, Zaldívar fled El Salvador and settled in San José, Costa Rica and established a pharmacy. In Costa Rica, Zaldívar befriended Costa Rican president Tomás Guardia Gutiérrez who helped Zaldívar obtain resources for his pharmacy.

== Presidency ==
In 1876, González left the presidency and handed power to Andrés del Valle, an ally who won the 1876 presidential election. González himself became Vice President and Commander-in-Chief of the Salvadoran Army. In April, Guatemalan president Justo Rufino Barrios invaded El Salvador after del Valle and González refused to support his invasion of Honduras. After two weeks, del Valle and González surrendered and resigned.

Barrios established the Junta of Notables to select El Salvador's next president. Zaldívar and General Indalecio Miranda were the two frontrunners of the election, but Zaldívar won due to his endorsement from Guardia. Zaldívar became Provisional President of El Salvador on 1 May 1876. He appointed a cabinet consisting of Cruz Ulloa as Minister of External Relations, Justice, Ecclesiastic Business, and Public Instruction; José López as Minister of Governance; General Estanislao Pérez as Minister of War; and Brigadier General Fabio Morán as Minister of Finance. On 11 May, Zaldívar signed a peace treaty with Guatemala.

There were attempted coups against Zaldívar in 1877, 1879, and 1883, but all attempts failed.

Zaldívar's nine-year presidency was the longest in Salvadoran history until Brigadier General Maximiliano Hernández Martínez served for 12 years between 1931 and 1944.

== Personal life ==
On 25 August 1858, Zaldívar married Sara Guerra, a Nicaraguan woman he met while attending university in Guatemala City. The couple had four children: Rafael, Sara, María, and Dolores.

Zaldívar was a pragmatic liberal.

== Awards and decorations ==
Zaldívar received the following awards and decorations.

France

- Commander of the Legion of Honor

Prussia

- Knight of the Order of the Black Eagle

Spain

- Grand Cross of the Order of Charles III
- Collar of the Order of Isabella the Catholic

Venezuela

- Collar of the Order of the Liberator

== See also ==
- List of heads of state and government who have been in exile

Political offices
Preceded by Ireneo Chacón	President of the Legislative Assembly of El Salvador; 1870	Succeeded by Rafael Campo
Preceded by Juan Delgado	Minister of War and Public; Instruction of El Salvador; 1871	Succeeded by Fabio Morán
Preceded by Andrés del Valle	President of El Salvador; 1876–1884	Succeeded by Ángel Guirola (acting)
Preceded by Ángel Guirola (acting)	President of El Salvador; 1884–1885	Succeeded by Fernando Figueroa (provisional)
