= 1903 in El Salvador =

- Decades: 1880s; 1890s; 1900s; 1910s; 1920s
- See also: Other events of 1903; Timeline of Salvadoran history

The following lists events that happened in 1903 in El Salvador.

== Incumbents ==
- President: Tomás Regalado Romero (until 1 March), Pedro José Escalón (starting 1 March)
- Vice President: Francisco Antonio Reyes (until 1 March), Calixto Velado (starting 1 March)

== Events ==
=== January ===
- January – Voters in El Salvador voted for Pedro José Escalón to be President of El Salvador.

=== March ===
- 1 March – Conservative Pedro José Escalón was sworn in as President of El Salvador. Calixto Velado was sworn in as Vice President.

=== Undated ===
- The Second Totoposte War was fought with Guatemala.

== Deaths ==
- 2 March – Rafael Zaldívar, politician (b. 1834)
- 21 March – Carlos Ezeta, politician (b. 1852)
