= 1907 in El Salvador =

- Decades: 1880s; 1890s; 1900s; 1910s; 1920s
- See also: Other events of 1907; Timeline of Salvadoran history

The following lists events that happened in 1907 in El Salvador.

== Incumbents ==
- President: Pedro José Escalón (until 1 March), Fernando Figueroa (starting 1 March)
- Vice President: Calixto Velado (until 1 March), Manuel Enrique Araujo (starting 1 March)

== Events ==
- January – Voters in El Salvador voted for Fernando Figueroa to be President of El Salvador.
- 1 March – Liberal Fernando Figueroa was sworn in as President of El Salvador. Manuel Enrique Araujo was sworn in as Vice President.
