= 1895 Salvadoran presidential election =

- January 1895
- Turnout: ~40%
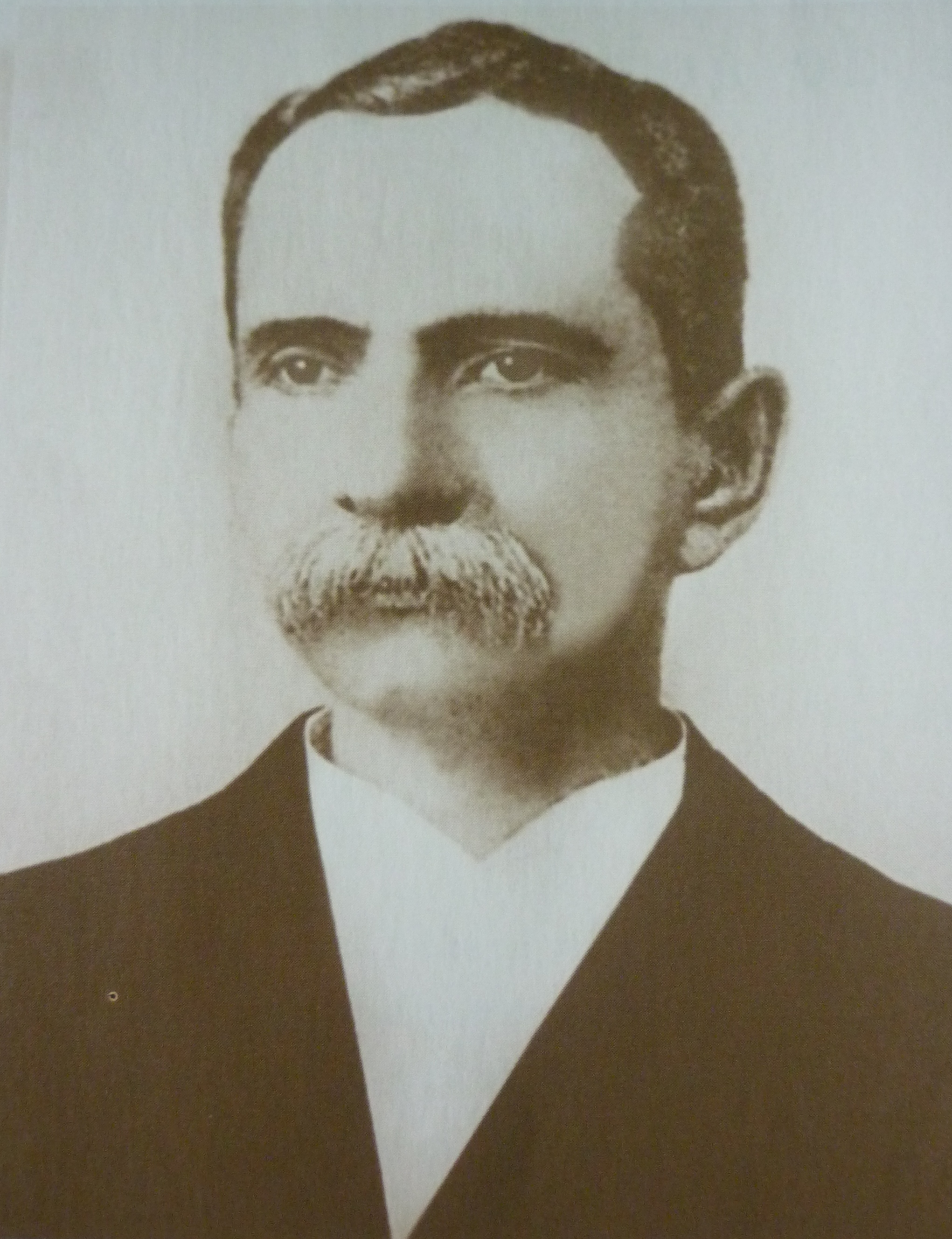
Candidate	Rafael Antonio Gutiérrez
Party	Liberal/Military
Popular vote	61,080
Percentage	99.85%
President before election
Rafael Antonio Gutiérrez
Liberal/Military
Elected President
Rafael Antonio Gutiérrez
Liberal/Military

Presidential elections were held in El Salvador in January 1895. General Rafael Antonio Gutiérrez, who was serving as the country's provisional president during the election, ran unopposed and was elected with over 99 percent of the vote. Concurrent vice presidential elections were held, during which, Prudencio Alfaro defeated Carlos Meléndez and four minor candidates.

The election was held in the aftermath of the Revolution of the 44 the previous year, wherein Gutiérrez overthrew Carlos and Antonio Ezeta. Fellow revolutionaries Alfaro and Meléndez competed to gain control of polling stations in the country's municipalities to secure the vice presidency, with no candidate running on an ideological platform. Two unsuccessful candidates, Tomás Regalado and Meléndez, would eventually obtain the presidency, with the former overthrowing Gutiérrez and Alfaro in 1898, and the latter becoming president in 1913 and founding the political dynasty that ruled the country for the next fifteen years.

== Campaign ==
Presidential elections were scheduled to be held in January 1895 following the Revolution of the 44 which overthrew President Carlos Ezeta and Vice President Antonio Ezeta in June 1894. General Rafael Antonio Gutiérrez, who led the revolution and succeeded Carlos as provisional president, ran for president unopposed. Meanwhile, the vice presidential election was contested by Prudencio Alfaro and Carlos Meléndez, both of whom were also leaders of the 1894 revolution. Gutiérrez did not endorse either candidate and allowed them to compete for the vice presidency. General Estanislao Pérez, General Tomás Regalado, and two other minor candidates also participated in the vice presidential election. All men were eligible to vote in the election.

Gutiérrez, Alfaro, Meléndez, and Regalado were all liberals. However, none of the candidates are known to have run on ideological platforms or proper policy proposals. Meléndez's campaign was supported by the Nueva San Salvador-based newspaper La Verdad.

== Results ==
In the presidential election, Gutiérrez received 61,080 votes with only 91 votes against. In the vice presidential election, Alfaro and Meléndez both sought to gain a competitive advantage over the other by ensuring that their allied municipal leaders would be in control of polling stations in the country's 248 municipalities. In 176 of the 248 municipalities, the winning candidate won with over 95 percent of the vote, due to the candidates seeking to install allies in charge of polling stations. Additionally, in 96 of the municipalities, the winning candidate won unanimously. Alfaro held an advantage in seven departments—Ahuachapán, La Paz, La Unión, Morazán, San Miguel, Sonsonate, and Usulután—while Meléndez held an advantage in two—Cabañas and San Vicente. Both candidates won by large margins in the departments where they held massive influence. Neither candidate had an outright advantage in the remaining five departments—Chalatenango, Cuscatlán, La Libertad, San Salvador, and Santa Ana—and the results across those departments were not as lopsided. Ultimately, Alfaro was elected vice president with 38,006 votes; Meléndez came in second place with 18,792 votes, and the other four candidates earned around 4,000 votes combined. Historian Erik Ching estimated oter turnout to be around 40%.

Ching described monopolizing voting at polling stations as "the golden rule of politics in El Salvador" and that the 1895 vice presidential election exemplified that. He also described Gutiérrez's role in the election as that of an "undisputed leader who kept electoral passions in check".

=== President ===
Candidate	Party	Votes	%
Rafael Antonio Gutiérrez	Liberal/Military	61,080	99.85
Against		91	0.15
Total		61,171	100.00
Source: Ching 1997, p. 175

=== Vice president ===
Candidate	Party	Votes	%
Prudencio Alfaro	Liberal	38,006	62.51
Carlos Meléndez	Liberal	18,792	30.91
Other candidates		4,000	6.58
Total		60,798	100.00
Source: Ching 1997, p. 175

==== Results by department ====
The following table displays the number of votes each candidate received from each of the country's 14 departments. The candidate with the most votes in a department is highlighted in gray. Results are not complete, and one candidate is not displayed.

Department	Alfaro	Meléndez	Pérez	Regalado	Hurtado
Department	Votes	Votes	Votes	Votes	Votes
Ahuachapán	3,647		167		
Cabañas					
Chalatenango	4,278	2,759			
Cuscatlán (Note: According to Erik Ching, the results of the 1895 vice presidential election in Cuscatlán was 2,679 votes for Meléndez and 2,632 votes for Alfaro.)	2,635	2,634			
La Libertad	1,001	2,752		472	
La Paz	3,334	408			
La Unión					
Morazán					
San Miguel					
San Salvador	4,543	2,696			
Santa Ana	1,210		1,901	432	
San Vicente	260	3,170			
Sonsonate	3,645	188	590		177
Usulután	3,096	270			
Total	38,006	18,792	≈4,000		
Source: Diario Oficial 1895, pp. 161–162

== Aftermath ==
Meléndez's supporters at La Verdad subsequently launched a public relations campaign, claiming in its pages that the elections had been fraudulent. Alfaro and Gutiérrez's supporters responded in the government newspaper Diario Oficial, accusing La Verdad of being a "clerical, Catholic paper" opposed to liberalism, and publishing results showing that multiple candidates received votes. They attributed Gutiérrez's unanimous victory to widespread public support for the revolution and the provisional government.

Gutiérrez and Alfaro both assumed office on 1 March 1895. In 1898, Regaldo overthrew the government due to Gutiérrez's plans to rig the upcoming presidential election to allow him to remain in office. Alfaro, Gutiérrez, and Meléndez all unsuccessfully ran for president in 1907, and that same year, Alfaro led a failed war against the Salvadoran government. In 1913, Meléndez finally became president, beginning a political dynasty that would rule the country for the next thirteen years.
