= 1911 in El Salvador =

- Decades: 1890s; 1900s; 1910s; 1920s; 1930s
- See also: Other events of 1911; Timeline of Salvadoran history

The following lists events that happened in 1911 in El Salvador.

== Incumbents ==
- President: Fernando Figueroa (until 1 March), Manuel Enrique Araujo (starting 1 March)
- Vice President: Manuel Enrique Araujo (until 1 March), Onofre Durán (starting 1 March)

== Events ==
=== January ===
- January – Voters in El Salvador voted for Manuel Enrique Araujo to be President of El Salvador.

=== March ===
- 1 March – Independent Manuel Enrique Araujo was sworn in as President of El Salvador. Onofre Durán was sworn in as Vice President.

== Births ==
- 22 July – José María Lemus, politician (d. 1993)
