= Luis Alonso Barahona =

Salvadoran military officer

General Luis Alonso Barahona
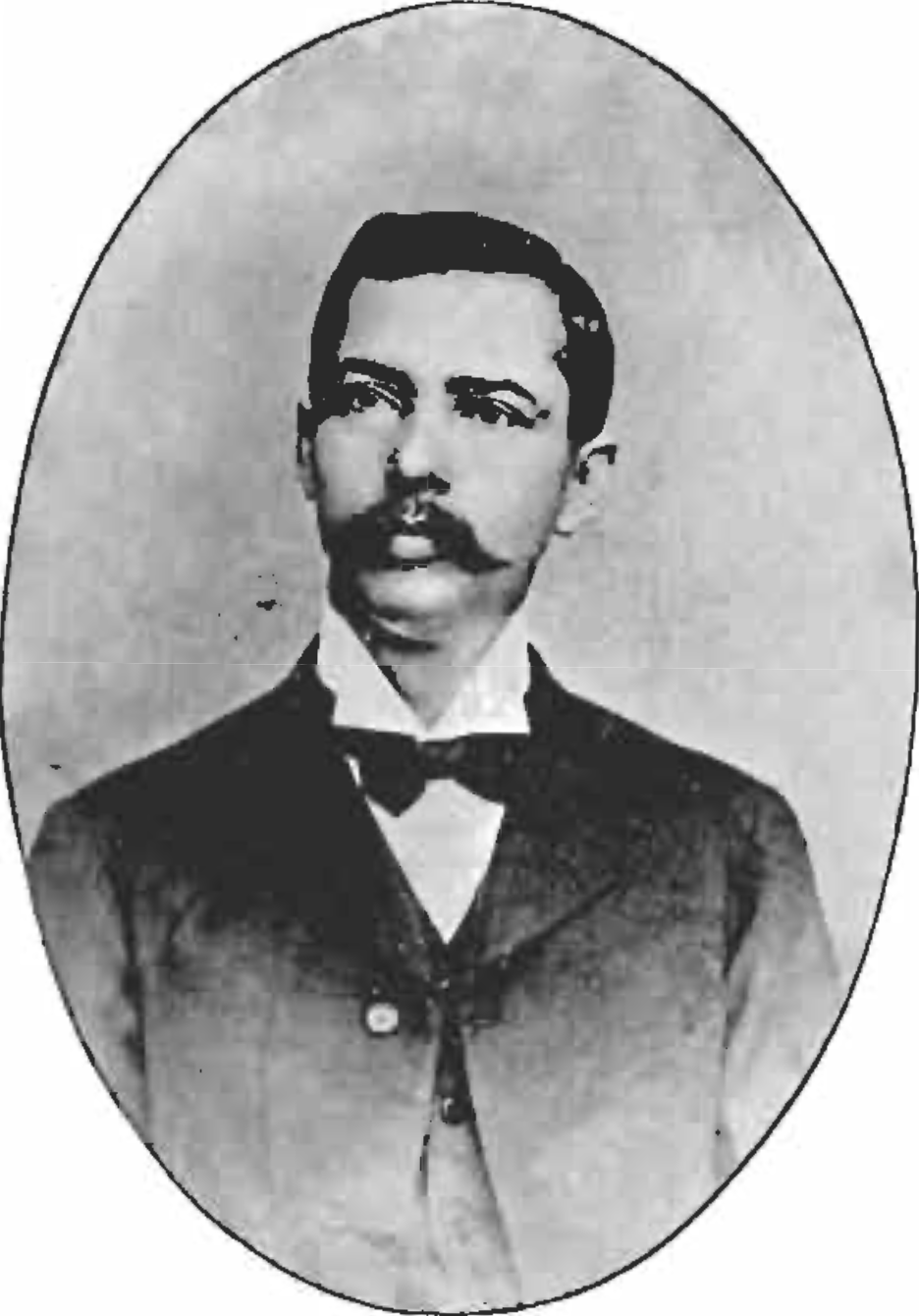

Minister of War and the Navy
- In office 3 March 1915 – 20 October 1915
- President: Carlos Meléndez; Alfonso Quiñónez Molina
- Preceded by: Pío Romero Bosque
- Succeeded by: Enrique Córdova

Governor of Cortés
- In office 9 August 1900 – 1 July 1902
- President: Terencio Sierra
- Preceded by: Pilar M. Martínez
- Succeeded by: Miguel Nuila

Deputy of the Greater Republic of Central America from El Salvador
- In office 27 August 1898 – 29 November 1898

Personal details
- Born: 17 October 1867 La Unión, El Salvador
- Died: 20 October 1915 (aged 48) El Salvador
- Spouse: Gertrudis Lemus
- Occupation: Military officer, politician, diplomat

Military service
- Allegiance: El Salvador
- Rank: General
- Battles/wars: Revolution of the 44; War of 1907

Luis Alonso Barahona (17 October 1867 – 20 October 1915), sometimes spelt Baraona, was a Salvadoran military officer, politician, and diplomat who served as the minister of war and the navy in 1915. He also served as the governor of the Honduran department of Cortés from 1900 to 1902 and as a deputy to the legislature of the Greater Republic of Central America in 1898. Barahona stood as a presidential candidate in El Salvador in both 1907 and 1911, however, he lost both elections to Fernando Figueroa and Manuel Enrique Araujo, respectively.

== Early life ==
Luis Alonso Barahona was born on 17 October 1867 in La Unión, El Salvador. He married Gertrudis Lemus.

== Career ==
On 17 May 1894, during the Revolution of the 44 which overthrew President Carlos Ezeta, Barahona commanded a group of soldiers and captured the city of Chalatenango. In 1897, Barahona served as the secretary of Crisanto Medina, the ambassador of the Greater Republic of Central America to the United Kingdom in London. Between 1897 and 1898, General Rafael Antonio Gutiérrez, the president of El Salvador whom the Revolution of the 44 brought to power, appointed Barahona as the general commander of the Santa Ana Department and as the sub-secretary of war. He was later employed as a professor at the University of El Salvador, and then later served as the legation secretary to France for the Greater Republic of Central America. Beginning on 27 August 1898, Barahona served as a deputy in the legislature of the Greater Republic and helped draft the country's constitution. He was named as the general commander of federal soldiers in Sensuntepeque.

Barahona was exiled from El Salvador in 1898 and relocated to San Pedro Sula, Honduras. On 9 August 1900, Honduran President Terencio Sierra appointed Barahona as the governor of the Cortés Department, replacing General Pilar M. Martínez. Barahona served as governor until 1 July 1902 when he was replaced by Colonel Miguel Nuila. Barahona also became the superintendent of the Honduran National Railroad. In 1907, Barahona returned to El Salvador and stood for election as a presidential candidate during the 1907 presidential election; he finished in second place behind Divisional General Fernando Figueroa and accumulated 222 votes, 0.15 percent of the total vote count. After losing the election, Barahona became part of a group of rebel commanders which led an army of at least 3,000 rebels from Honduras against Figueroa in a June 1907 rebellion. The rebellion, which only lasted one day, failed to overthrow Figueroa and subsequently withdrew back to Honduras. Barahona again ran for president during the 1911 presidential election but lost to Manuel Enrique Araujo; the number of votes received by Barahona is unknown.

On 3 March 1915, newly elected President Carlos Meléndez appointed Barahona to serve as minister of war and the navy, succeeding Francisco Martínez Suárez. Diario Oficial, the Salvadoran government's official newspaper, described Barahona as "one of [the government's] most important collaborators" ("unos de sus más importantes colaboradores").

== Death ==
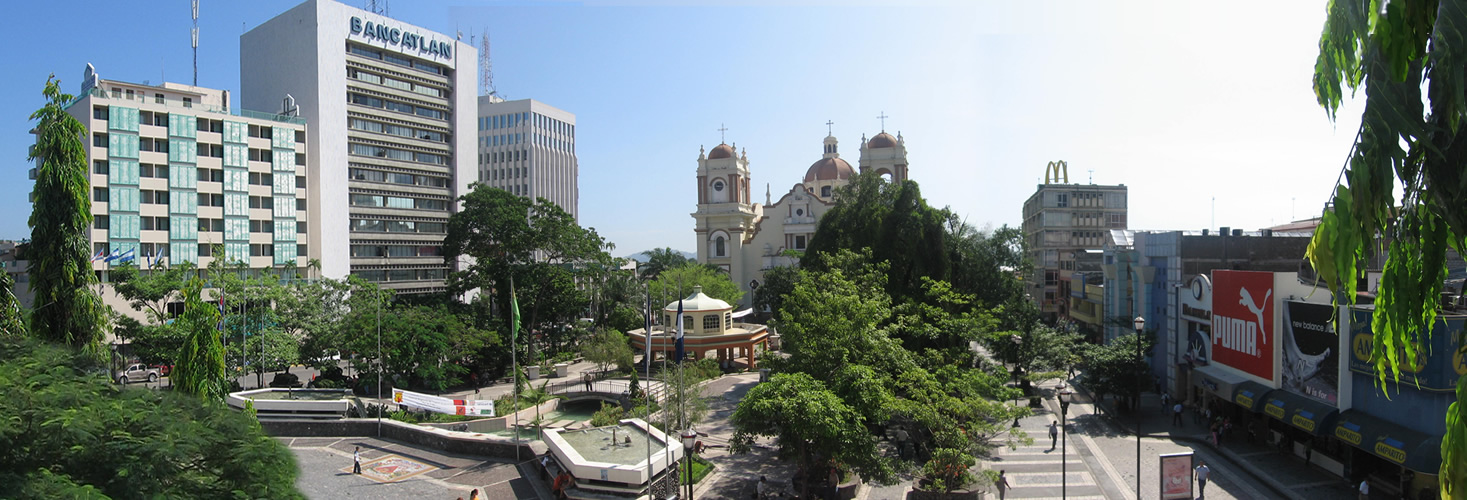
Luis Alonso Baraona Central Park in San Pedro Sula, Honduras

Barahona died on 20 October 1915 at 6:30 a.m. local time due to illness. Meléndez declared nine days of national mourning and appointed Enrique Córdova to succeeded Barahona as minister of war and the navy. Barahona's funeral was held in San Salvador on 22 October. Miguel Mármol, a Salvadoran activist who founded the Communist Party of El Salvador, claimed in his biography that Barahona was poisoned by the Salvadoran government.

The Luis Alonso Baraona Central Park in San Pedro Sula, Honduras is named after him. A statue of Barahona was erected in the park in 1936.

== Electoral history ==
| Year | Office | Type | Party | Main opponent | Party | Votes for Barahona | | | | Result | Swing |
| Year | Office | Type | Party | Main opponent | Party | Total | % | P. | ±% | Result | Swing |
|---|---|---|---|---|---|---|---|---|---|---|---|
| 1903 | President of El Salvador | General | Military | Pedro José Escalón | Liberal | Unknown | | | | Lost | Hold |
| 1907 | President of El Salvador | General | Military | Fernando Figueroa | Liberal | 222 | 0.15 | 2nd | N/A | Lost | Hold |
| 1911 | President of El Salvador | General | Military | Manuel Enrique Araujo | Liberal | Unknown | | | | Lost | Hold |

Political offices
| Preceded by Pilar M. Martínez | Governor of Cortés; 1900–1902 | Succeeded by Miguel Nuila |
| Preceded by Pío Romero Bosque | Minister of War and the Navy; 1915 | Succeeded by Enrique Córdova |
