= 1910 in El Salvador =

- Decades: 1890s; 1900s; 1910s; 1920s; 1930s
- See also: Other events of 1910; Timeline of Salvadoran history

This is a list of events that happened in 1910 in El Salvador.

== Incumbents ==
- President: Fernando Figueroa
- Vice President: Manuel Enrique Araujo

== Events ==
In the decade of 1900-1910, El Salvador experienced great economic, political and social changes. Coffee exports expanded in 1901, boosting economic growth. Politically, the first constitutional president was elected in 1903 and a war was fought against Guatemala in 1906. Socially, the ruling classes continued to dominate while the gap between rich and poor widened.

== Births ==
- 14 December – Óscar Osorio, politician (d. 1969)

== Deaths ==
- 27 April – Ángel Guirola, politician (b. 1826)
