= 1900 in El Salvador =

- Decades: 1880s; 1890s; 1900s; 1910s; 1920s
- See also: Other events of 1900; Timeline of Salvadoran history

The following lists events that happened in 1900 in El Salvador.

== Incumbents ==
- President: Tomás Regalado Romero
- Vice President: Francisco Antonio Reyes
