= 1912 in El Salvador =

- Decades: 1890s; 1900s; 1910s; 1920s; 1930s
- See also: Other events of 1912; Timeline of Salvadoran history

The following lists events that happened in 1912 in El Salvador.

== Incumbents ==
- President: Manuel Enrique Araujo
- Vice President: Onofre Durán

== Events ==
=== May ===
- 27 May – The current Flag of El Salvador was adopted.

=== September ===
- 15 September – The current Coat of arms of El Salvador was adopted.

=== Undated ===
- The National Guard of El Salvador was established by President Manuel Enrique Araujo.
