= 1913 in El Salvador =

- Decades: 1890s; 1900s; 1910s; 1920s; 1930s
- See also: Other events of 1913; Timeline of Salvadoran history

The following lists events that happened in 1913 in El Salvador.

== Incumbents ==
- President: Manuel Enrique Araujo (until 9 February), Carlos Meléndez Ramírez (starting 9 February)
- Vice President: Onofre Durán (until 9 February), Vacant (starting 9 February)

== Events ==
=== February ===
- 9 February – Manuel Enrique Araujo was attacked with machetes and assassinated. Carlos Meléndez Ramírez became Provisional President.
- 11 February – The Roman Catholic Diocese of San Miguel was established with Juan Antonio Dueñas y Argumedo as Ordinary. The Roman Catholic Diocese of Santa Ana was also established.
