= 1911 Salvadoran presidential election =

- 8–10 January 1911
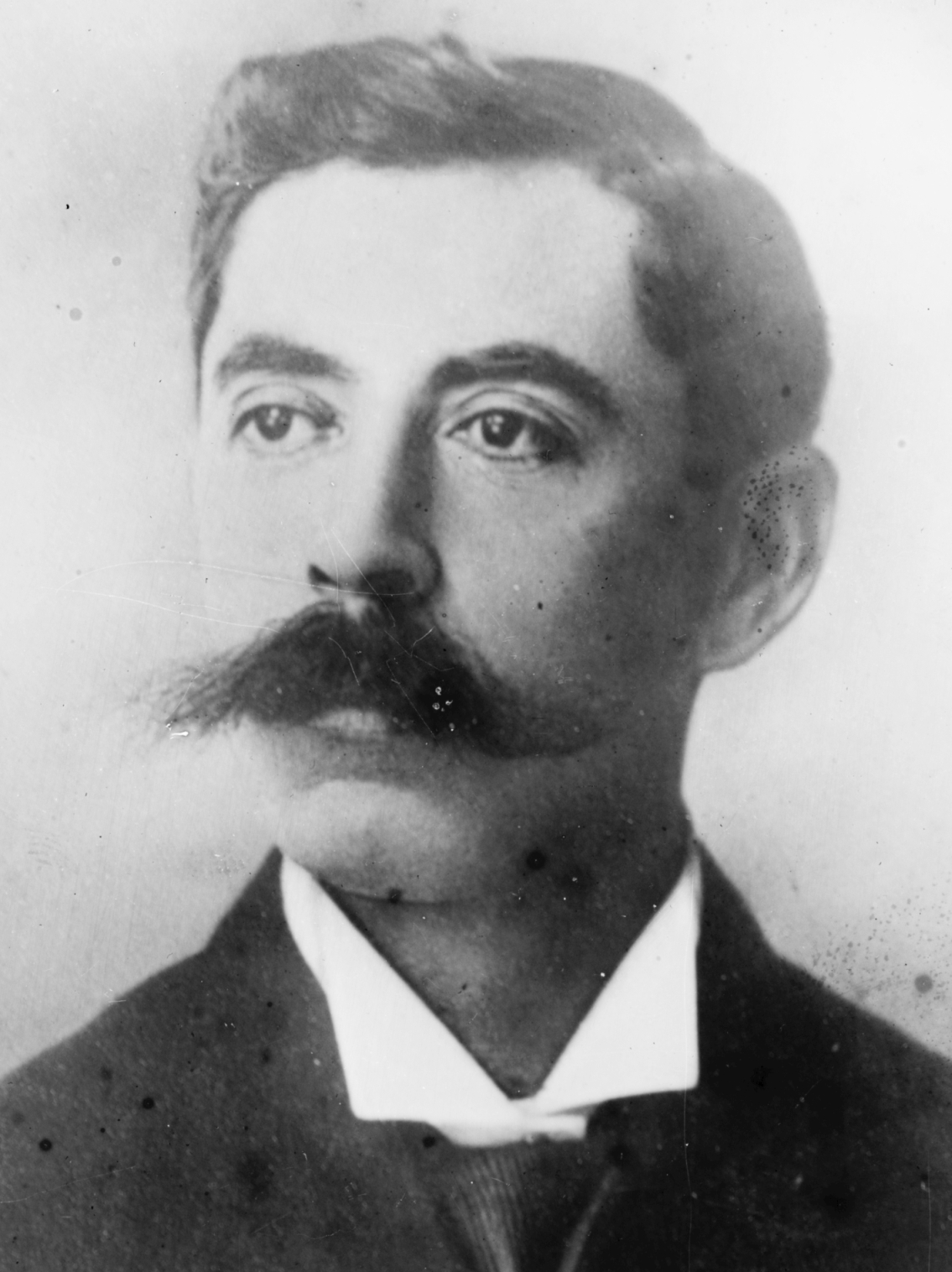
Candidate	Manuel Enrique Araujo
Party	Liberal
Running mate	Onofre Durán Santillana
Popular vote	182,964
President before election
Fernando Figueroa
Liberal/Military
Elected President
Manuel Enrique Araujo
Liberal

Presidential elections were held in El Salvador in January 1911. Manuel Enrique Araujo was elected president through a popular election, receiving 182,964 votes. Araujo defeated General Luis Alonso Barahona and Doctor Esteban Castro. All men were eligible to vote in the election.

President Fernando Figueroa selected Araujo as his successor and heavily rigged the election in his favor. Historian Alastair White wrote that "opponents were allowed to participate but not allowed to win". Thomas Dabney, the United States interim chargé d'affaires to El Salvador, wrote that "popular suffrage is but a fiction [...] That the official candidate will be elected in 1911, is according to general opinion, a foregone conclusion". The Diario Oficial newspaper reported that the 182,964 votes in favor Araujo "genuinely represented" ("genuinamente representado") the will of the people.

== Results ==
Candidate	Party	Votes	%
Manuel Enrique Araujo	Liberal	182,964	
Luis Alonso Barahona	Military/Independent		
Esteban Castro	Independent		
Total			
Source: Diario Oficial 1911, p. 105
