= 1907 Salvadoran presidential election =

- 13 January 1907
- Presidential election
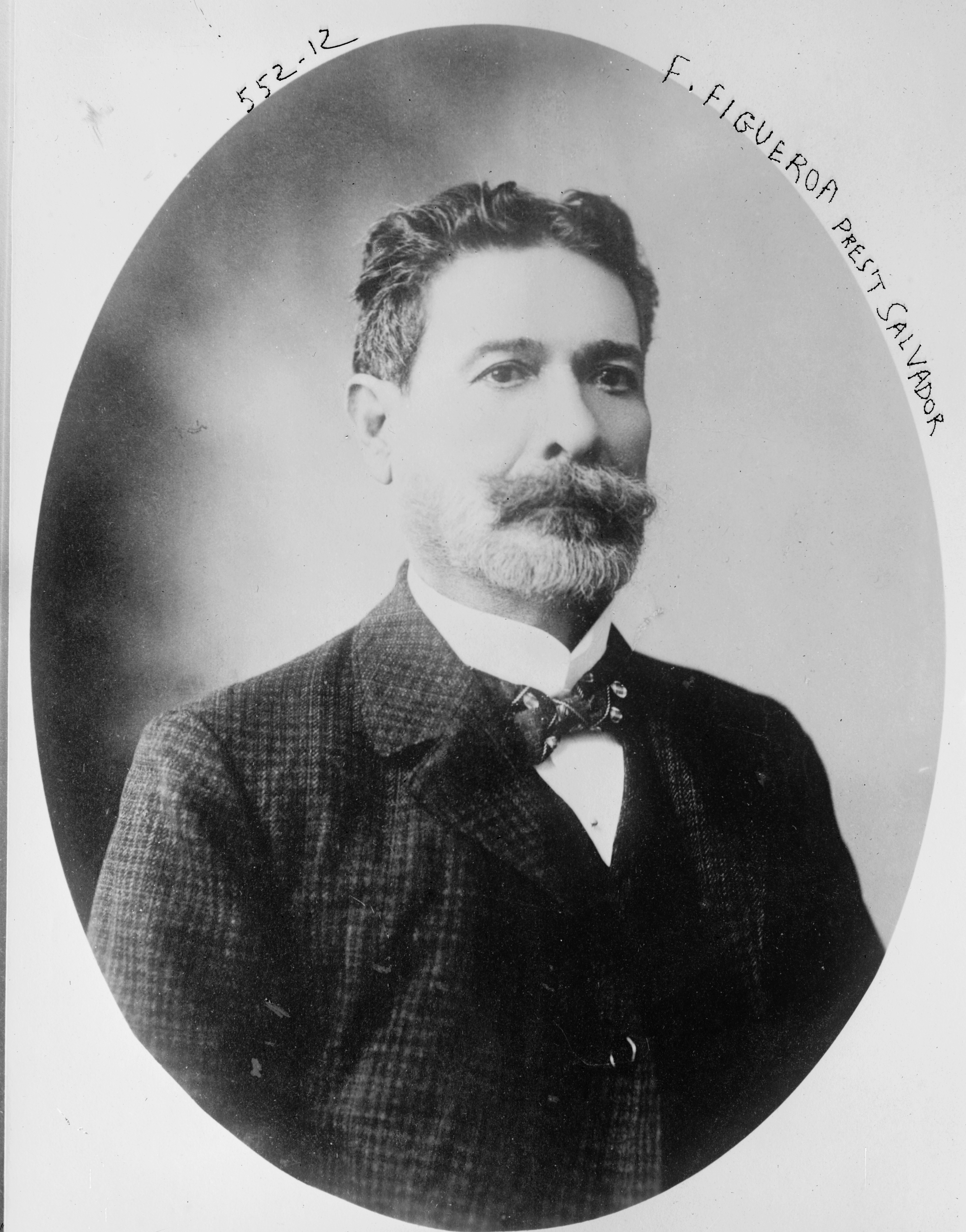

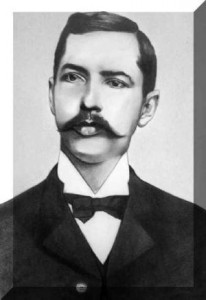
Candidate	Fernando Figueroa	Luis Alonso Barahona
Party	Liberal/Military	Liberal/Military
Popular vote	152,053	222
Percentage	99.76%	0.15%
- Results by department
President before election
Pedro José Escalón
Liberal/Military
Elected President
Fernando Figueroa
Liberal/Military

Presidential elections were held in El Salvador on 13 January 1907. Divisional General Fernando Figueroa was elected with 99.76 percent of the vote. His closest rival Luis Alonso Barahona received 222 votes to Figueroa's 152,053.

== Campaign ==
Prior to the 1907 presidential election, President General Pedro José Escalón and his allies hand-picked Vice President Divisional General Fernando Figueroa to be his successor as president of El Salvador. This followed a precedent set by Escalón's predecessor, Tomás Regalado, who selected him as his successor ahead of the 1903 presidential election. Some politicians opposed Figueroa's selected. Among them were General Luis Alonso Barahona who decided to run against Figueroa. Before the election, Figueroa had Barahona arrested and Barahona's supporters were persecuted.

== Results ==
All men were eligible to vote in the election.

=== President ===
Candidate	Party	Votes	%
Fernando Figueroa	Liberal/Military	152,053	99.76
Luis Alonso Barahona	Liberal/Military	222	0.15
Horacio Villavicencio	Independent/Military	39	0.03
Rafael Guirola Duke	Liberal	16	0.01
Camilo Arévalo	Independent	11	0.01
Carlos Meléndez	Liberal	8	0.01
Potenciano Escalón	Independent/Military	6	0.00
Baltasar Estupinián	Liberal	4	0.00
Rafael Antonio Gutiérrez	Liberal/Military	1	0.00
Prudencio Alfaro	Liberal	1	0.00
Other candidates		58	0.04
Total		152,419	100.00
Source: Diario Oficial 1907, p. 354

==== Results by department ====
The following table displays the number of votes each presidential candidate received from each of the country's 14 departments. The candidate with the most votes in a department is highlighted in gray.

Department	Figueroa	Barahona	Villavicencio	Guirola	Arévalo	Meléndez	Escalón	Estupinián	Gutiérrez	Alfaro	Others
Department	Votes	Votes	Votes	Votes	Votes	Votes	Votes	Votes	Votes	Votes	Votes
Ahuachapán	9,902	2	2	0	3	0	0	0	0	0	0
Cabañas	5,364	1	0	0	0	0	0	0	0	0	0
Chalatenango	9,778	142	1	0	0	3	0	0	1	0	0
Cuscatlán	9,890	4	1	0	0	2	0	0	0	0	0
La Libertad	11,797	13	3	16	6	1	4	0	0	0	8
La Paz	14,299	11	24	0	0	0	0	0	0	0	17
La Unión	6,655	1	1	0	0	0	0	0	0	0	4
Morazán	9,457	0	0	0	0	0	0	0	0	0	0
San Miguel	11,467	2	0	0	0	1	0	1	0	0	0
San Salvador	18,851	3	5	0	0	1	0	0	0	1	0
Santa Ana	13,947	2	1	0	2	0	1	0	0	0	3
San Vicente	6,778	15	0	0	0	0	0	0	0	0	0
Sonsonate	11,028	26	1	0	0	0	1	3	0	0	3
Usulután	12,840	0	0	0	0	0	0	0	0	0	0
Total	152,053	222	39	16	11	8	6	4	1	1	58
Source: Diario Oficial 1907, p. 354

=== Vice president ===
Candidate	Party	Votes	%
Manuel Enrique Araujo	Liberal	146,298	95.47
José Miguel Batrés	Independent/Military	6,689	4.36
Jorge Meléndez	Liberal	112	0.07
Norberto Morán	Independent	24	0.02
José María Estupinián	Independent/Military	11	0.01
Other candidates		112	0.07
Total		153,246	100.00
Source: Diario Oficial 1907, p. 354

==== Results by department ====
The following table displays the number of votes each vice presidential candidate received from each of the country's 14 departments. The candidate with the most votes in a department is highlighted in gray.

Department	Araujo	Batrés	Meléndez	Morán	Estupinián	Others
Department	Votes	Votes	Votes	Votes	Votes	Votes
Ahuachapán	9,901	0	0	0	0	7
Cabañas	5,365	0	0	0	0	1
Chalatenango	9,769	0	112	0	0	13
Cuscatlán	10,885	0	0	0	0	26
La Libertad	11,790	0	0	0	0	1
La Paz	14,298	0	0	0	11	26
La Unión	6,617	0	0	0	0	3
Morazán	9,457	0	0	0	0	0
San Miguel	11,469	0	0	0	0	3
San Salvador	18,855	0	0	0	0	4
Santa Ana	13,926	0	0	0	0	18
San Vicente	6,770	0	0	23	0	0
Sonsonate	4,354	6,689	0	1	0	10
Usulután	12,842	0	0	0	0	0
Total	146,298	6,689	112	24	11	112
Source: Diario Oficial 1907, p. 354

== Aftermath ==
Figueroa and Araujo were inaugurated as president and vice president, respectively, on 1 March 1907.
