= Guirola family =

Salvadoran elite family

The Guirola clan was a prominent Salvadoran political family which formed in the city of Santa Tecla, where they were considered pioneers of local development. The family accumulated massive fortunes through the indigo trade and banking, eventually involving themselves in national politics, philanthropy and diplomacy.

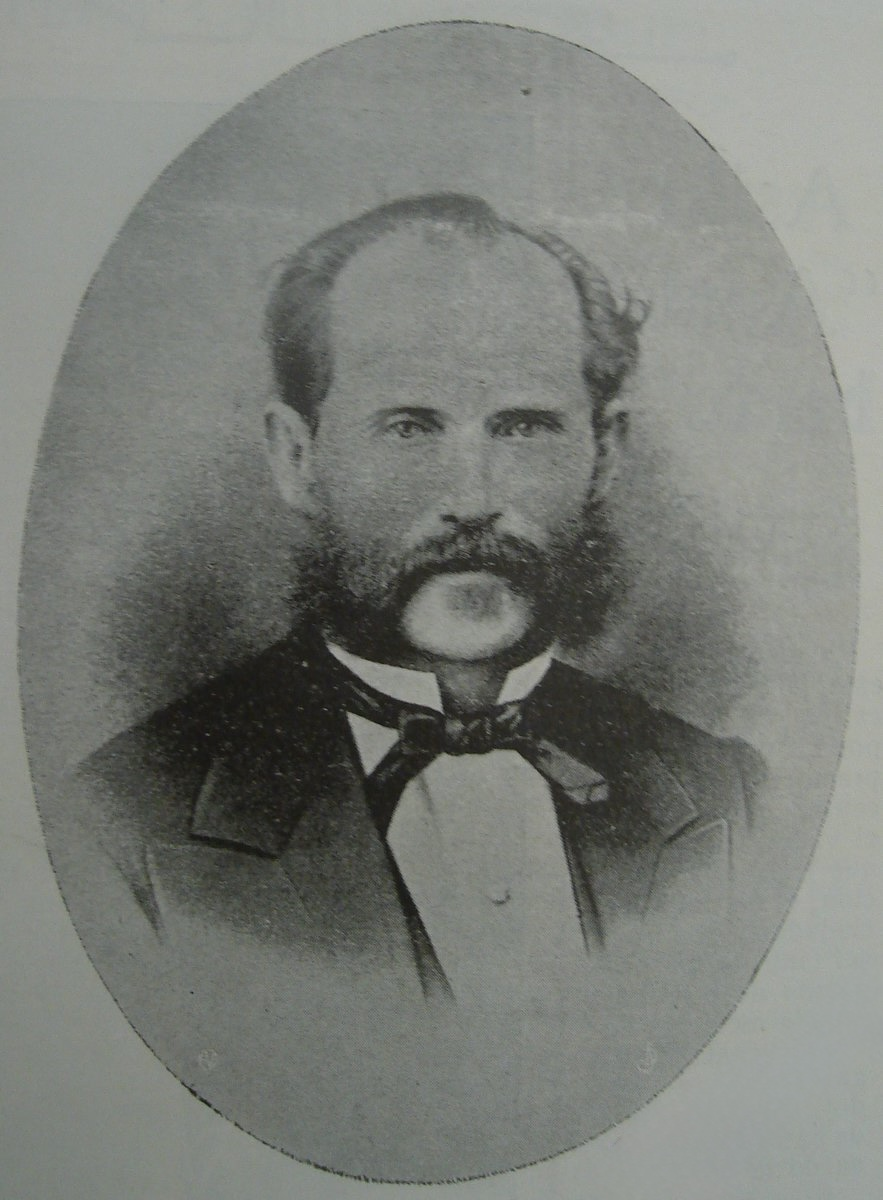
Ángel Guirola (1826–1910) businessman, politician, banker, and patriarch of the large family.

== Family ==
The family traced back to one Rafael María Guirola (1780–1837), a Spanish businessman from Santander who settled in Zacatecoluca, where he became a councilman and governor of La Paz Department. His son, Ángel Guirola de la Cotera (1826–1910) became patriarch of the clan, involving himself in national trade and banking, even serving as the acting President of El Salvador in 1884.

In New York City, Ángel married a wealthy woman from Kingston, Jamaica, named Cordelia Duke Alexander. Together they had seven children, one being Rafael Guirola Duke, a politician and diplomat who served as the Minister of Finance (1892–1894, 1911–1913) Another son, Eduardo Guirola Duke, was a banker and philanthropist.

The Guirola descendants continued to manage the family business, with most marrying into other prominent families.

== Properties ==
- The Guirola Mansion, known better as the Casa de las Águilas (Santa Tecla, El Salvador)

== See also ==
- History of El Salvador
