= Prudencio Alfaro =

Salvadoran politician (1861–1915)

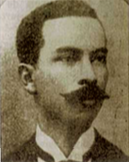

13th Vice President of El Salvador
- In office 1 March 1895 – 13 November 1898
- President: Rafael Antonio Gutiérrez
- Preceded by: Antonio Ezeta
- Succeeded by: Francisco Antonio Reyes

Personal details
- Born: 1861 Jutiapa, Guatemala
- Died: 23 December 1915 (aged 53–54) San Salvador, El Salvador
- Cause of death: Execution
- Party: Liberal
- Spouse: Carmen Castellanos
- Occupation: Politician

Prudencio Alfaro Menéndez (1861 – 23 December 1915) was a Salvadoran politician who served as Vice President of El Salvador from 1895 until 1898. He later led a joint Honduran-Nicaraguan invasion of El Salvador in 1907.

== Early life ==
Prudencio Alfaro Menéndez was born in 1861 in Jutiapa, Guatemala. His father was Manuel Alfaro and his mother was Andrea Menéndez. He attended the University of El Salvador where he completed his bachelor's degree and doctorate in the Faculty of Political and Social Sciences.

== Political career ==
In 1885, he participated in a revolution which overthrew Salvadoran President Rafael Zaldívar, and after which, he was elected as a deputy to the Legislative Assembly of El Salvador from Ahuachapán. He opposed the government of President Carlos Ezeta, who deposed President Francisco Menéndez in 1890, and in 1894, he participated in the Revolution of the 44 which deposed Ezeta and installed Rafael Antonio Gutiérrez as president.

In the 1895 Salvadoran presidential election, Gutiérrez was the only candidate and won 61,080 votes. For Vice President, the race was between Alfaro, Carlos Meléndez, and four other politicians, and Alfaro won with 38,006 votes accounting for 62.51 percent of the vote. He assumed office on 1 March 1895.

Both Gutiérrez and Alfaro were deposed on 13 November 1898 by Tomás Regalado. Alfaro sought to regain power and fought Regalado at two battles in Ilobasco and Sensuntepeque, however, he lost both battles and fled for exile in Honduras.

Alfaro stood for election for the presidency in 1907 but only received one vote.

== 1907 invasion of El Salvador ==
On 11 June 1907, Alfaro was one of the leaders of a joint Honduran-Nicaraguan invasion of El Salvador against President Fernando Figueroa. During the invasion, another leader, Manuel Rivas, raided a bank in Acajutla for $20,000 in silver, which led to a personal disagreement between Alfaro and Rivas on how to continue the invasion. Rivas proposed that the two split control of the country, with Rivas controlling the east from San Salvador and Alfaro controlling everything west of San Salvador, however, Alfaro rejected the proposal. After Figueroa personally led an army to engage with Alfaro and Rivas, the two ordered their armies to retreat, effectively ending the War of 1907.

== Later years and death ==
Alfaro was allowed to return to El Salvador in 1911 when Manuel Enrique Araujo became president, however, he was accused of being involved in Araujo's assassination in 1913, and again left the country. He again returned to El Salvador in 1915 when Carlos Meléndez became president. Alfaro was executed in San Salvador on 23 December 1915 for his alleged role in Araujo's assassination.

== Personal life ==
He married Carmen Castellanos.

== Electoral history ==
Year	Office	Type	Party	Main opponent	Party	Votes for Alfaro				Result	Swing
Year	Office	Type	Party	Main opponent	Party	Total	%	P.	±%	Result	Swing
1895	Vice President of El Salvador	General	Liberal	Carlos Meléndez	Ind.	38,006	62.51	1st	N/A	Won	Hold
1907	President of El Salvador	General	Liberal	Fernando Figueroa	Liberal	1	0.00	10th	N/A	Lost	Hold

== See also ==
- Rafael Antonio Gutiérrez

Political offices
Preceded by Antonio Ezeta	Vice President of El Salvador; 1895–1898	Succeeded by Francisco Antonio Reyes
