= 1903 Salvadoran presidential election =

- 16 February 1903
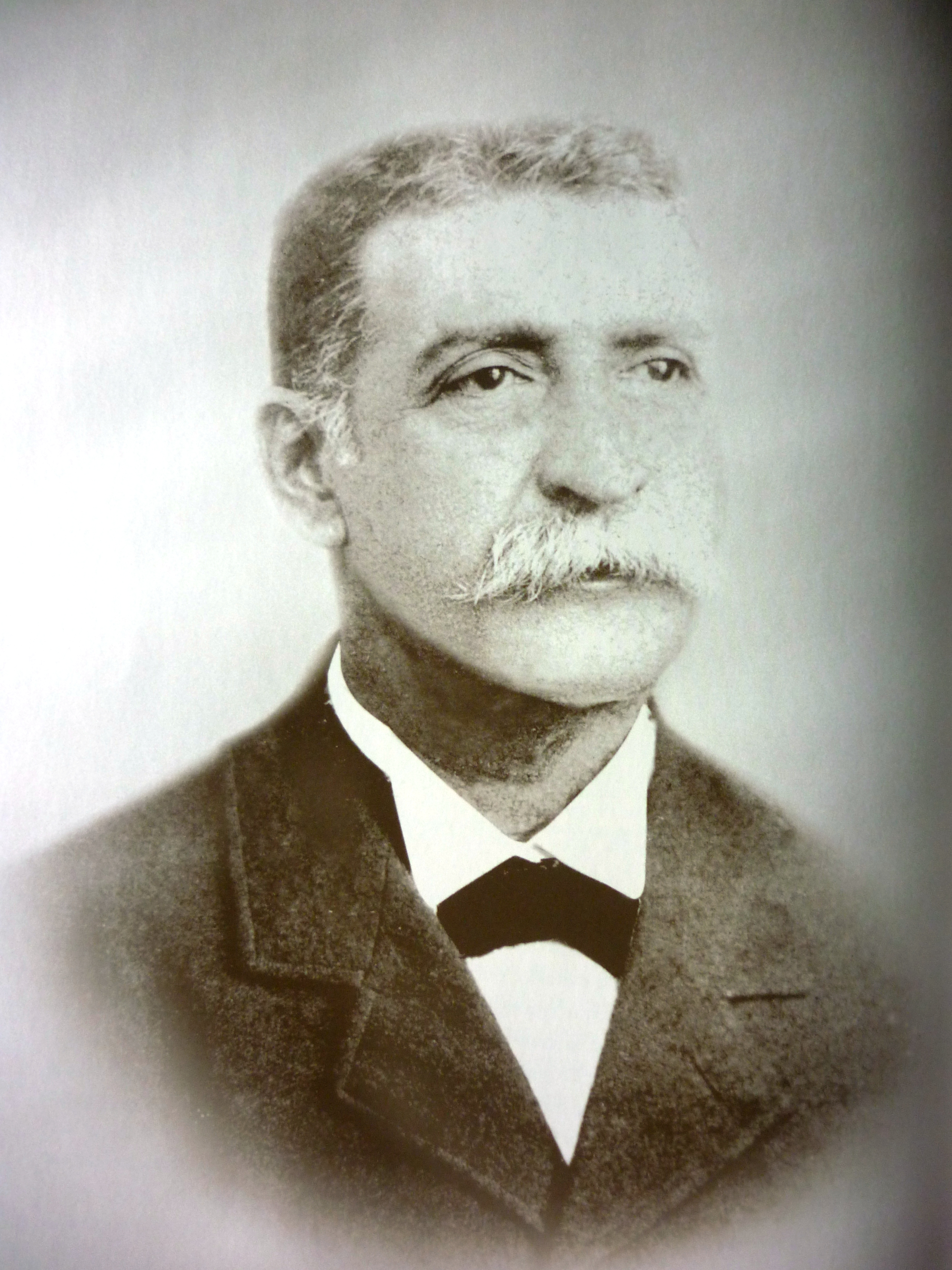

Candidate	Pedro José Escalón	Francisco Antonio Reyes
Party	Liberal/Military	Liberal
Popular vote	91,861	19,900
Percentage	77.82%	16.86%
- Results by department
President before election
Tomás Regalado
Liberal/Military
Elected President
Pedro José Escalón
Liberal/Military

Presidential elections were held in El Salvador on 16 February 1903. General Pedro José Escalón was elected with 78 percent of the vote. President Tomás Regalado hand-picked Escalón to be his successor. All men were eligible to vote in the election.

== Results ==
=== President ===
Candidate	Party	Votes	%
Pedro José Escalón	Liberal/Military	91,861	77.82
Francisco Antonio Reyes	Liberal	19,900	16.86
Potenciano Escalón	Independent/Military	5,445	4.61
Tomás Regalado	Liberal/Military	501	0.42
Joaquín Pérez	Independent	150	0.13
Other candidates (Note: Other candidates for president were Carlos Meléndez, José Rosa Pacas, Fidel Novoa Meléndez, Hermógenes Alvarado, Dionisio Arzú, Emilio Peñate, Samuel Luna, Camilo Arévalo, Rafel S. López, David Rosales, Horacio Villavicencio, Juan Espinosa, Baltasar Estupinián, Calixto Velado Eduardo, Rubén Rivera, Federico Prado, Rafael Reyes, José Antonio Trigueros, Justo Sol, Mardoqueo Sandoval, Manuel Antonio Reyes, Juan María Villatoro, Nicolás Angulo, Francisco Reyes, Juan F. Castro, Domingo López, Santiago Contreras, Gonzalo Herrera, Fernando Gómez, Luis Alonso Barahona, Joaquín Medina, and Onofre Durán Santillana.)		191	0.16
Total		118,048	100.00
Source: Diario Oficial 1903, p. 298

==== Results by department ====
The following table displays the number of votes each presidential candidate received from each of the country's 14 departments. The candidate with the most votes in a department is highlighted in gray.

Department	P.J. Escalón	Reyes	P. Escalón	Regalado	Pérez	Others
Department	Votes	Votes	Votes	Votes	Votes	Votes
Ahuachapán	9,603	275	9	2	4	10
Cabañas	4,907	23	0	7	0	9
Chalatenango	8,579	81	166	30	2	1
Cuscatlán	6,102	1,964	199	43	0	10
La Libertad	4,721	1,902	349	36	27	14
La Paz	2,006	4,271	1,471	130	1	26
La Unión	4,699	793	0	122	0	26
Morazán	6,477	257	1	2	0	2
San Miguel	8,874	243	2	4	0	18
San Salvador	4,501	5,342	2,423	69	0	4
Santa Ana	10,735	462	28	29	114	15
San Vicente	3,597	2,689	501	8	0	5
Sonsonate	8,064	336	278	7	1	23
Usulután	8,996	1,252	18	12	1	28
Total	91,861	19,900	5,445	501	150	191
Source: Diario Oficial 1903, p. 298

=== Vice president ===
Candidate	Party	Votes	%
Calixto Velado Eduardo	Independent	69,142	58.58
Joaquín Badica	Independent	17,840	15.11
Onofre Durán Santillana	Liberal	17,750	15.04
José Rosa Pacas	Independent	8,572	7.26
Samuel Luna	Independent	1,989	1.69
José Miguel Batrés	Independent/Military	787	0.67
Simeon Magaña	Independent	190	0.16
Potenclano Facilia	Independent	149	0.13
Carlos Meléndez	Liberal	138	0.12
Other candidates (Note: Other candidates for vice president were Emeterio S. Ruano, Francisco Antonio Reyes, Enrique Vásquez, Fidel Novoa Meléndez, Rafael S. López, Maximiliano González, Santiago Andrade, Carlos d'Aubuisson, Baltasar Estupinián, José Antonio Martínez, Hilario Interiano, Santiago Meléndez, Francisco Hurtado, Enrique Zeyala, Hermógenes Alvarado, Alfredo Lara, Joaquín Pérez, Ramón Flores, Máximo Brizuela, Samuel Quiróz, Manuel Delgado, Guillermo Mazzini, David Rosales, Alejandro Velásquez, Rubén Rivera, Eugenio Araujo, Dionisio Aráuz, Francisco García de Machén, Estanislao Pérez, Juan María Villatoro, and Carlos Modesto Meléndez.)		1,476	1.25
Total		118,033	100.00
Source: Diario Oficial 1903, p. 298

==== Results by department ====
The following table displays the number of votes each presidential candidate received from each of the country's 14 departments. The candidate with the most votes in a department is highlighted in gray.

Department	Velado	Badica	Durán	Rosa	Luna	Batrés	Magaña	Facilia	Meléndez	Others
Department	Votes	Votes	Votes	Votes	Votes	Votes	Votes	Votes	Votes	Votes
Ahuachapán	9	4	9,680	10	0	0	0	1	1	36
Cabañas	3,385	13	1,514	0	0	0	0	0	4	105
Chalatenango	8,520	33	0	125	9	0	0	2	0	119
Cuscatlán	6,145	1,993	0	50	0	0	0	1	1	13
La Libertad	4,935	1,369	115	279	23	380	190	25	1	42
La Paz	314	4,214	1,697	1,410	0	0	0	1	117	133
La Unión	4,775	646	2	1	0	0	0	1	8	157
Morazán	6,486	250	0	0	0	0	0	0	0	107
San Miguel	8,866	210	0	0	0	0	0	0	3	144
San Salvador	6	5,334	4,490	2,416	1	1	0	1	0	106
Santa Ana	8,903	276	1	20	1,956	0	0	112	0	106
San Vicente	0	2,306	0	4,140	0	0	0	0	0	133
Sonsonate	7,771	27	260	111	0	406	0	1	0	120
Usulután	9,027	1,171	0	1	0	0	0	4	3	127
Total	69,142	17,840	17,750	8,572	1,989	787	190	149	138	1,476
Source: Diario Oficial 1903, p. 298
