= Cordelia Duke Alexander =

Salvadoran socialite

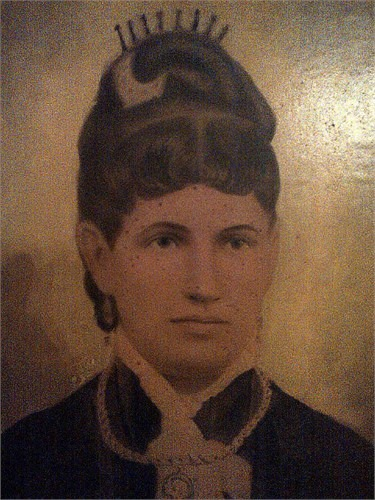
- Born: 31 December 1834; Kingston, Jamaica
- Died: 3 January 1920 (aged 85); Nueva San Salvador, El Salvador
- Occupation: Socialite
- Spouse: Ángel Guirola (m. 1859; died 1910)
- Children: 7, including Rafael

Cordelia Duke Alexander (31 December 1834 – 3 January 1920) was a Salvadoran socialite originally from Kingston, Jamaica, and the wife of Ángel Guirola, a prominent banker and politician. She is the matriarch of the Guirola family, which played a major role in Salvadoran society during the 19th century.

Duke was born in Kingston, Jamaica to Isaac Duke and Judith Alexander. She married Guirola in New York City in 1858 or 1859, while serving as a deputy in San Salvador. The couple had around 7 children, with descendants marrying into other prominent elite families. Duke died on 3 January 1920, in Nueva San Salvador.
