= War of 1907 =

War in Central America in 1907

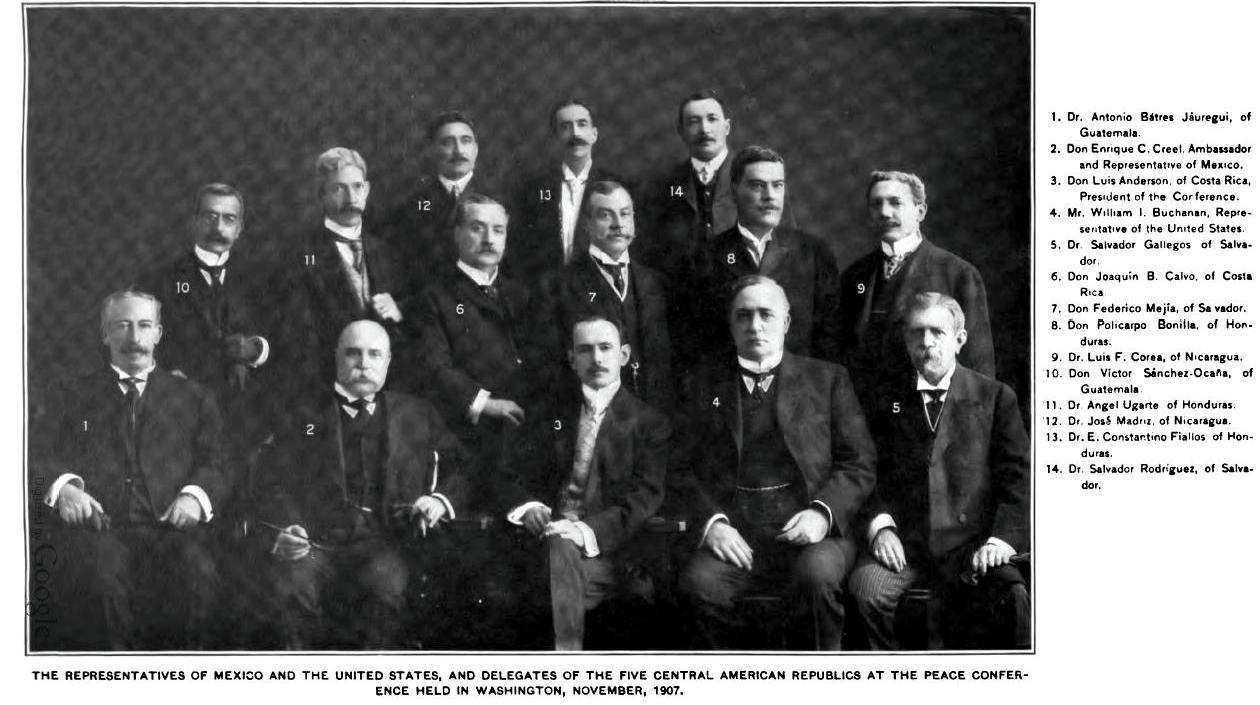
- Delegates of the peace conference by the end of war
Date	11 June 1907 – 20 December 1907; (6 months, 1 week and 2 days); Active conflict: 11 June 1907 (1 day)
Location	Central America
Result	Salvadoran military victory
Territorial changes	Status quo ante bellum

Belligerents
El Salvador	Nicaragua; Salvadoran exiles; American filibusters; Honduras

Commanders and leaders
Fernando Figueroa	José Santos Zelaya; Manuel Rivas; Luis Alonso Barahona; Prudencio Alfaro; Miguel R. Dávila

Units involved
1st Infantry Regiment; 1st Artillery Regiment	Unknown

Strength
82,881–100,000	Unknown; At least 4,000; 1 gunboat

Casualties and losses
300 Salvadorans dead	400 Nicaraguans dead; 300 Hondurans dead
- 1300–2500 total killed

The War of 1907 (Spanish: Guerra de 1907) was a conflict fought between El Salvador and an alliance between Honduras, Nicaragua, Salvadoran exiles, and American filibusters. The invasion of El Salvador on 11 June 1907 resulted in a quick military victory for El Salvador as invading forces withdrew by the end of the day. The war officially ended with the signing of a peace treaty on 20 December 1907 which established the Central American Court of Justice.

== Background ==
On 13 November 1898, a coup d'état in El Salvador led by General Tomás Regalado overthrew President General Rafael Antonio Gutiérrez, and after the coup, Regalado declared that El Salvador would no longer be a member of the Greater Republic of Central America, which it was a part of at the time. As a result of Regalado's coup, his declaration of secession from the Greater Republic, and the failure of the militaries of Honduras and Nicaragua, the other two members of the Greater Republic, to take action to forcibly prevent El Salvador's secession, the Executive Federal Council of the Greater Republic of Central America voted to dissolve the union on 29 November 1898.

From 1898 to 1903, Rafael Zaldívar, the former President of El Salvador from 1876 to 1885, attempted to convince Regalado and Mexican President Porfirio Díaz to forcibly reestablish a Central American union, like how Guatemalan President Justo Rufino Barrios attempted in 1885, but his efforts failed when Regalado's term ended in 1903. On 20 January 1902, Costa Rica, El Salvador, Honduras, and Nicaragua signed the Treaty of Peace and Compulsory Arbitration which strengthened political ties between the nations. On 2 November 1903, Guatemala, Honduras, and Nicaragua signed another treaty which outlined a similar agreement, and on 21 August 1904, El Salvador, Guatemala, Honduras, and Nicaragua signed a third treaty outlining another similar agreement. Despite the treaties, a war erupted in 1906 when Guatemala invaded El Salvador and Honduras. The war was ended with a peace treaty on 25 September 1906 when the United States intervened diplomatically. Another war erupted on 19 February 1907 when Nicaragua invaded Honduras and overthrew President Manuel Bonilla. The war ended with another diplomatic intervention by the United States and Mexico, and the nations of Central America signed the 1907 Central American Treaty of Peace and Amity on 23 April 1907.

== War ==
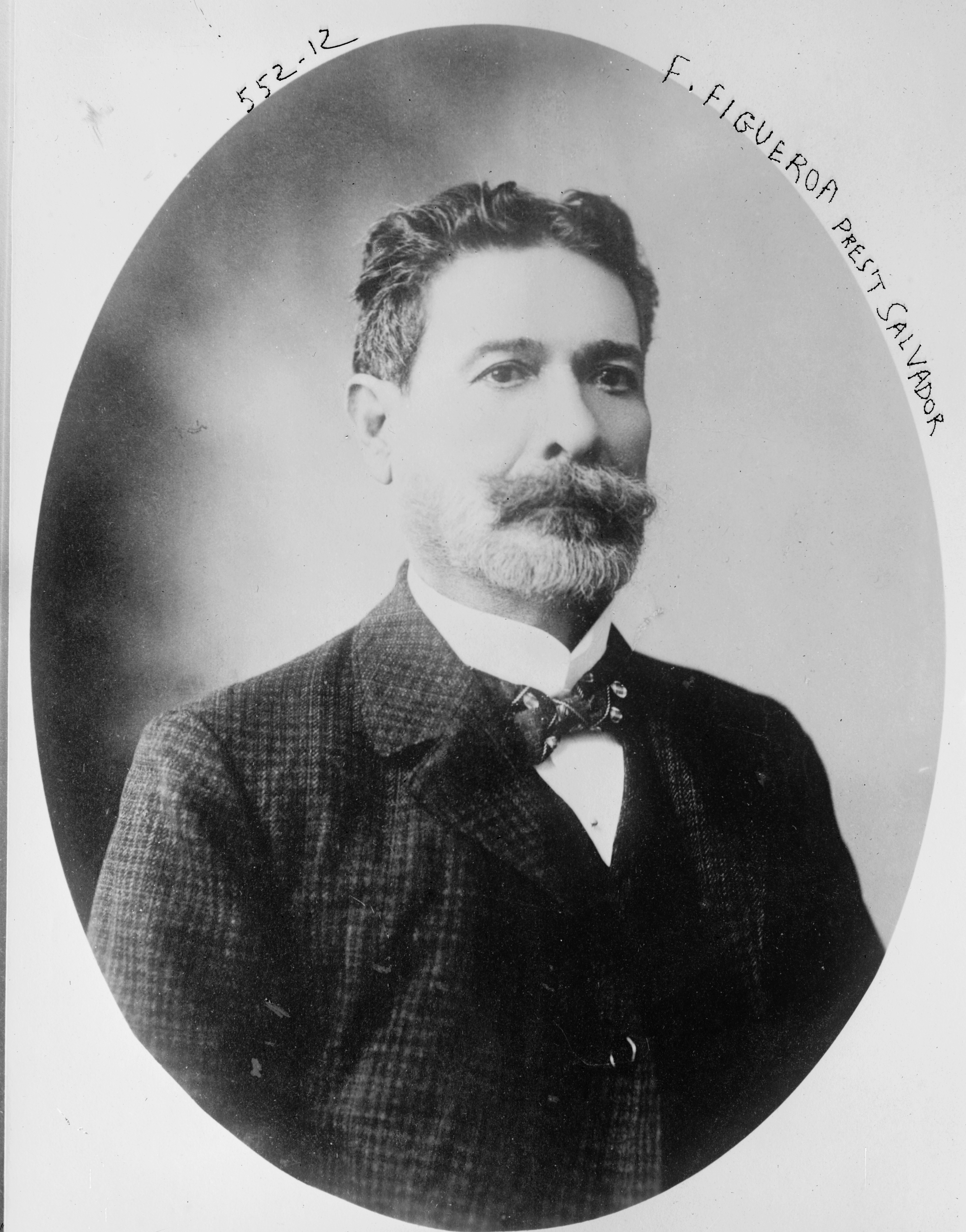
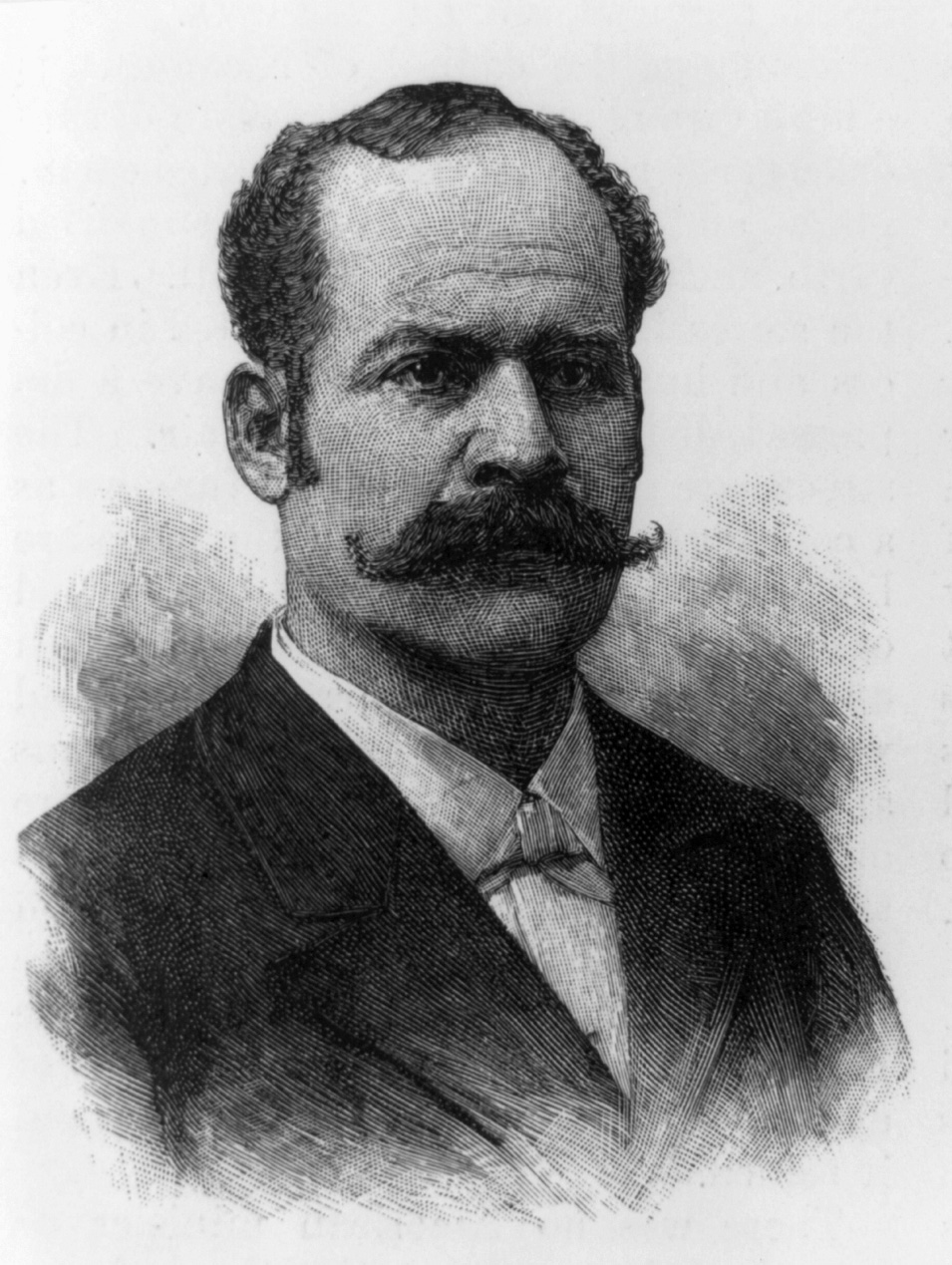
Fernando Figueroa (left) and José Santos Zelaya (right).

On 11 June 1907, a joint coalition of Honduran and Nicaraguan soldiers, Salvadoran exiles, and American filibusters launched a surprise invasion of Salvadoran territory in open violation of the treaty of peace and amity which was only signed two months prior. The coalition was led by General Manuel Rivas, an exiled Salvadoran military officer who was a leader of the 1894 Revolution of the 44 which brought Gutiérrez to power, General Luis Alonso Barahona, another exiled Salvadoran military officer, and Dr. Prudencio Alfaro, an exiled Salvadoran politician who served as the Vice President of El Salvador under Gutiérrez's administration from 1895 until he was deposed in 1898. José Santos Zelaya, the President of Nicaragua, intended to help install Alfaro as President of El Salvador, deposing incumbent President General Fernando Figueroa in the process. Miguel R. Dávila allowed Honduran soldiers to join the invasion force the day prior to the invasion. During the first month of the invasion, the invading forces commenced a naval landing in Acajutla, capturing the city and seizing locomotives and cars belonging to the Salvadoran Railroad Company in the process, and the army also arrived at the city of Sonsonate.

The day of the invasion, Figueroa gave a speech entitled "Proclamation to the Salvadoran People" in an effort to retain the loyalty and morale of the citizens of El Salvador and of the Salvadoran Army. He stated:

Compatriots: General J. Santos Zelaya, in violation of the faith imposed in international agreements, has broken his solemn obligations contracted through the intervention of the Governments of the United States and Mexico. At day-break this morning he surprised the small military force at Acajutla, and has landed Nicaraguan forces with the object of conquest. Before this brutal offense which the Nicaraguan Government has committed against us, we should all, as one man, gather round the flag of our country and defend it, letting our blood flow rather than allow it to be stained by the adventurers who, in an evil hour, seek to defile it. The national honor, the deeds of our forefathers, the future of our children, and the lofty legends of our people, cry to us to arise and punish the insolence of the Nicaraguan President, and to preserve, not only our military glory and our interests, which recent events in Honduras have shown to be in danger, but the respect that our heroic army has inspired whenever it has been called upon in defense of our country.

Soldiers: Do not permit the consummation of this insolent attempt in the annals of an enlightened people which would fill us with shame and opprobrium, rendering us unworthy to preserve intact the sacred treasure of our autonomy, the honour of our victorious banner and our sovereignty. Before permitting the arms of an audacious adventurer to violate the soil of our beloved country, whose safeguard is entrusted to the national army and to your undoubted patriotism, prefer yes, a thousand times, death with honor on the battlefield, where I will accompany you even to death.

I have full confidence in your loyalty and in your military honor, and I therefore place in your hands the sacred trust of the national defense.

Free and heroic peoples never retreat before the enemy, for they carry in their hearts the conscience of doing their duties and confidence in the right, which assist all worthy and independent peoples to repel aggression against their autonomy.

Salvadorans: In this movement be assured that I shall save, untarnished, the honor of the country and the security of your homes, which are now threatened by the mercenary soldiery of the Nicaraguan ruler.

Your chief and friend,

— Fernando Figueroa, San Salvador, 11 June 1907

He also telegrammed Dr. Manuel Delgado, the Salvadoran ambassador to the United States, who was in Washington D.C. at the time:

This morning the revolutionists bombarded and captured the port of Acajutla. The forces were commanded by General Manuel Rivas, and came from Corinto in the warship Momotombo, armed by the President of Nicaragua. It is in this manner that President Zelaya complies with the terms of the Treaty of Amapala, which was the result of the intervention of the American Government

In Acajutla, Rivas raided a bank for $20,000 in silver, which led to a personal disagreement between Rivas and Alfaro. Rivas proposed to Alfaro that they split control over the country, with Rivas ruling the east from San Salvador and Alfaro ruling the west from Sonsonate, but Alfaro objected to the proposal. Figueroa later personally led an army to Acajutla, and upon hearing the news, the soldiers under Rivas and Alfaro retreated from the city, using several boats and barges to flee to the gunboat Momotombo which landed them there.

In northern El Salvador, General Salvador Toledo commanded Salvadoran exiles and Hondurans in an invasion along the Salvadoran–Guatemalan border. General Cierra commanded 3,000 soldiers in eastern El Salvador, marching south with the intention of capturing La Unión. Figueroa declared San Salvador to be under a state of siege in order to suspend political guarantees and arrest political opponents, despite not actually being under siege.

The war effectively ended after the first day, as the invading forces withdrew from El Salvador after no direct combat having occurred. The objective of the invasion was to capture the entire country by the end of the month.

== Aftermath ==
On 14 November 1907, the United States opened a peace conference in Washington D.C. to end the war, in which the five nations of Central America, Costa Rica, El Salvador, Guatemala, Honduras, and Nicaragua were invited. Honduras and Nicaragua presented a plan to reestablish a Central American union, but the plan met objections from the delegates from Costa Rica, El Salvador, and Guatemala, and the proposal eventually was dropped. On 20 December 1907, the five nations signed the treaty which established the Central American Court of Justice. The Court held its first session on 1 January 1909.

== See also ==
- Federal Republic of Central America – the first and longest lasting union of Central American nations
