= 1899 Salvadoran presidential election =

- January 1899
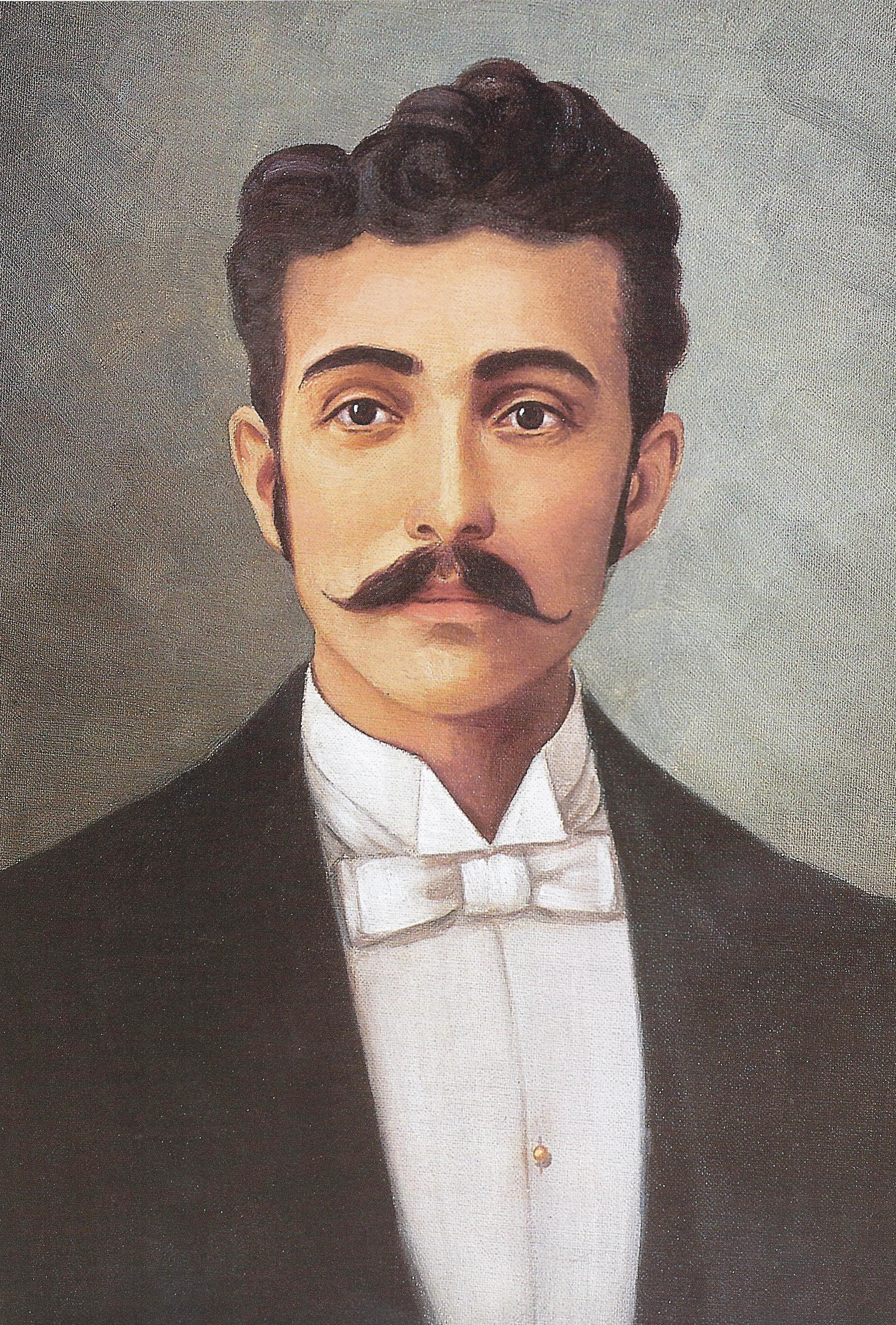
Candidate	Tomás Regalado
Party	Liberal/Military
Running mate	Francisco Antonio Reyes
President before election
Tomás Regalado
Liberal/Military
Elected President
Tomás Regalado
Liberal/Military

Presidential elections were held in El Salvador in January 1899. Provisional president General Tomás Regalado was the only candidate. No results were posted.

== Results ==
Candidate	Party
Tomás Regalado	Liberal/Military
Total
Source: University of California, San Diego
