= Ángel Guirola =

Salvadoran politician

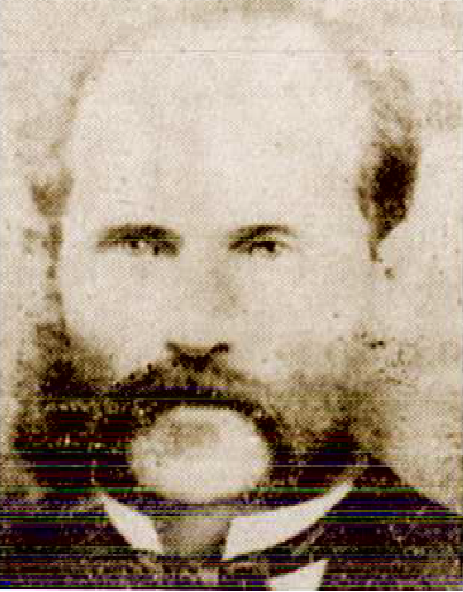

President of El Salvador
- In office 6 April 1884 – 21 August 1884; Acting President
- Preceded by: Rafael Zaldívar
- Succeeded by: Rafael Zaldívar

President of the Legislative Assembly of El Salvador
- In office 14 January 1885 – 29 May 1885
- Preceded by: Himself
- Succeeded by: Hermógenes Alvarado Gómez
- In office 19 January 1884 – 29 February 1884
- Preceded by: Teodoro Moreno
- Succeeded by: Himself

Deputy of the Legislative Assembly of El Salvador
- In office 1866–1885

Personal details
- Born: Ángel Guirola de la Cotera; 5 August 1826 Zacatecoluca, Federal Republic of Central America
- Died: 27 April 1910 (aged 83) Nueva San Salvador, El Salvador
- Party: Independent
- Spouse: Cordelia Duke Alexander (m. 1859)
- Relations: Guirola family
- Children: 7, including Rafael
- Occupation: Politician

Ángel Guirola de la Cotera (5 August 1826 – 27 April 1910) was a Salvadoran politician who served as the acting president of El Salvador in 1884 and as the president of the Legislative Assembly in 1884 and 1885.

== Biography ==
Ángel Guirola de la Cotera was born in Zacatecoluca, Federal Republic of Central America, on 5 August 1826. His parents were Rafael María Guírola and Gertrudis de la Cotera y González. He married Cordelia Duke Alexander in 1859 in New York City. He had seven children: José Adalberto (who died during the Third Totoposte War), Rafael, Ángel, Eduardo, Julia, Lulú, and Matilde.

Guirola was elected as the mayor of San Vicente in 1852. He was elected as a deputy to the Legislative Assembly in 1866 from the department of San Salvador. He served as the president of the Legislative Assembly from 19 January 1884 to 29 February 1884, and again from 14 January 1885 to 29 May 1885. Additionally, he was installed as the acting president of El Salvador from 6 April 1884 to 21 August 1884 while President Rafael Zaldívar was on an official visit to Europe. Guirola resigned from the legislature in 1885 and left the country for the United States and Europe.

He died on 27 April 1910 in Nueva San Salvador, El Salvador (modern-day Santa Tecla).
