= Rafael Guirola Duke =

Salvadoran politician and diplomat

Doctor Rafael Guirola Duke
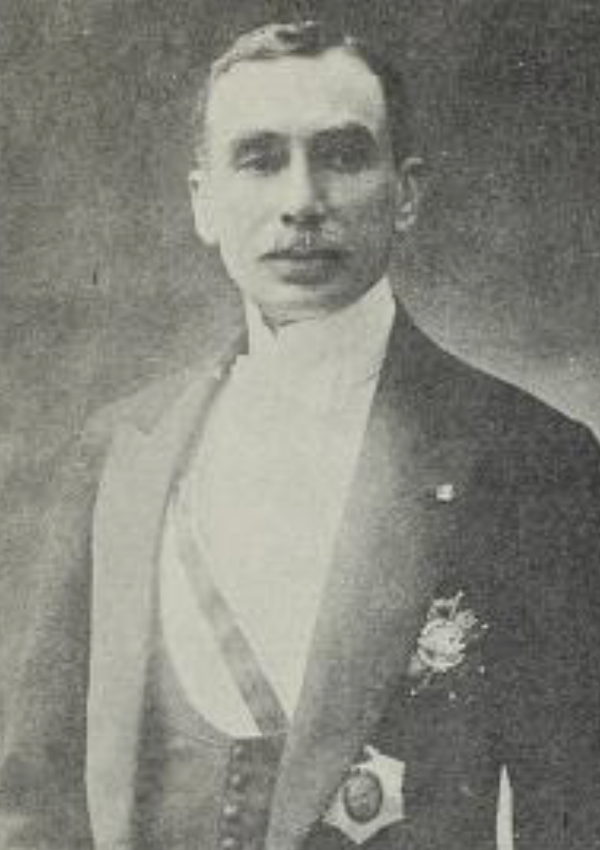
- Guirola in c. 1916

Minister of Finance and Public Credit of El Salvador
- In office 1 March 1911 – 9 February 1913
- President: Manuel Enrique Araujo
- Preceded by: Domingo López
- Succeeded by: Tomás García Palomo
- In office 1892 – 9 June 1894
- President: Carlos Ezeta
- Preceded by: Reyes Arrieta Rossi
- Succeeded by: Cornelio Lemus

Personal details
- Born: 4 October 1864 Zacatecoluca, El Salvador
- Died: 23 April 1919 (aged 54) Nueva San Salvador, El Salvador
- Spouse: Claudia Matamoros
- Parent(s): Ángel Guirola; Cordelia Duke Alexander
- Occupation: Politician, diplomat

Rafael Guirola Duke (4 October 1864 – 23 April 1919) was a Salvadoran politician and diplomat who served as Minister of Finance from 1892 to 1894 and from 1911 to 1913.

== Career ==
Guirola (far-right) at the Pan-American Scientific Congress in 1915

Rafael Guirola Duke was born on 4 October 1864 in Zacatecoluca, El Salvador. His parents were Ángel Guirola (the acting president of El Salvador in 1884) and Cordelia Duke Alexander from Kingston, Jamaica. Guirola had 6 siblings: José Adalberto, Ángel, Eduardo, Gertrudis, Cordelia Julia, and Matilde.

From 1892 to 1884, Guirola served as minister of finance and public credit under President General Carlos Ezeta. Guirola was elected as a member of the Legislative Assembly of El Salvador in 1895. Guirola ran in the 1907 presidential election. He only won 16 votes, all from La Libertad, and finished in fourth place.

From March 1911 to February 1913, Guirola served as minister of finance and public credit under President Manuel Enrique Araujo. Araujo also appointed Guirola as El Salvador's ambassador to Belgium, France, Ireland, and the United Kingdom. During a state visit to Spain, King Alfonso XIII awarded Guirola the Grand Cross of the Order of Isabella the Catholic.

In 1916, Guirola was El Salvador's ambassador to Costa Rica. Guirola was elected as the honorary president of the Subcommittee of Physical Culture in 1918.

Guirola died on 23 April 1919 in Nueva San Salvador, El Salvador (modern-day Santa Tecla).

== Personal life ==
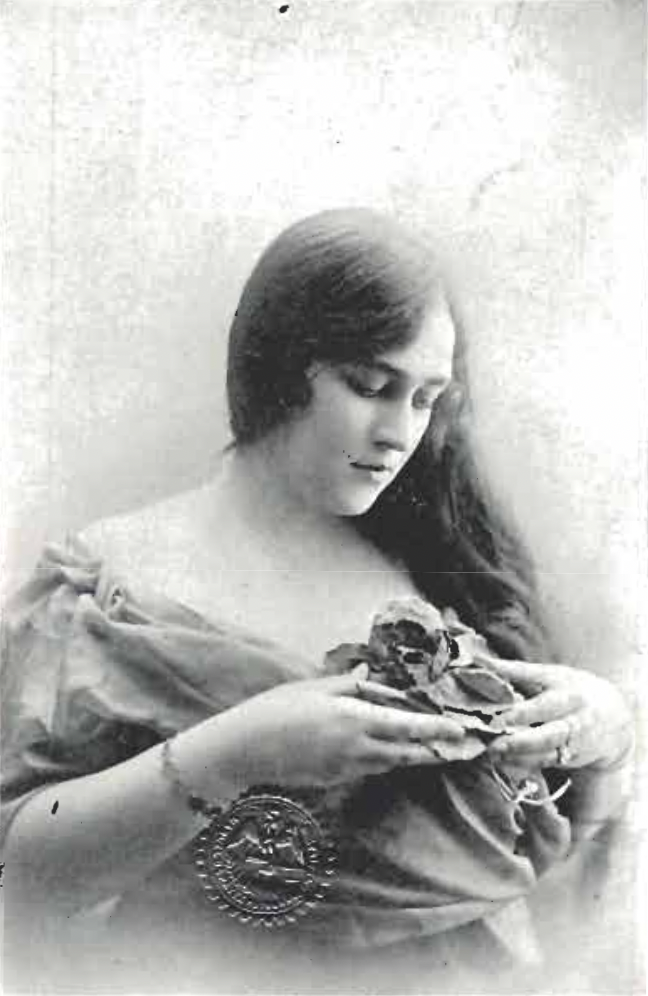
Guirola's wife Claudia Matamoros

Guirola married Claudia Matamoros, a Costa Rican woman.

Guirola owned four coffee plantations in Nueva San Salvador known as El Paraíso, La Asunción, San Luis, and San Rafael. In 1910, these four plantations produced a combined 300,000 pounds (140,000 kg) of coffee.

== Electoral history ==
Year	Office	Type	Party	Main opponent	Party	Votes for Guirola				Result	Swing	Ref
Year	Office	Type	Party	Main opponent	Party	Total	%	P.	±%	Result	Swing	Ref
1907	President of El Salvador	General	Independent	Fernando Figueroa	Liberal	16	0.01	4th	N/A	Lost	Hold	

Political offices
Preceded by Reyes Arrieta Rossi	Minister of Finance and Public Credit of El Salvador; 1892–1894	Succeeded by Cornelio Lemus
Preceded by Domingo López	Minister of Finance and Public Credit of El Salvador; 1911–1913	Succeeded by Tomás García Palomo
