= Calixto Velado =

Salvadoran politician

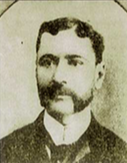

Vice President of El Salvador
- In office 1 March 1903 – 1 March 1907
- President: Pedro José Escalón
- Preceded by: Francisco Antonio Reyes Gálvez
- Succeeded by: Manuel Enrique Araujo

Minister of Finance
- In office 1 March 1923 – 1923
- President: Alfonso Quiñónez Molina
- Preceded by: Reyes Arrieta Rossi
- Succeeded by: Gustavo Vides

Personal details
- Born: Calixto Velado Eduardo; 14 March 1855 Izalco, El Salvador
- Died: 16 March 1927 (aged 72)

Calixto Velado Eduardo (14 March 1855 – 16 March 1927) was a politician and writer from El Salvador who was Vice President of El Salvador during the presidency of Pedro José Escalón.

== Biography ==
Calixto Velado Eduardo was born on 14 March 1855, in Izalco, Sonsonate department. He attended secondary school in the United States and Europe. His first published poem was El cantar de la paloma, which made his writings became widely known throughout Central America, Spain, and France. He wrote the books "Arte y Vida" and "Poema de Job". He was a founding member of the Academia de Ciencia y Bellas Artes. He worked as a manager of the Banco Occidental.

Velado was a representative for Izalco in the Constituent Assembly of 1871. He served as the Treasurer General of the Republic (1885-1890) during economically difficult times. He was a candidate in the 1903 Salvadoran presidential election to be Vice President of El Salvador. He won, receiving 69,142 out of 118,033 votes, defeating numerous other candidates including future vice president Onofre Durán and future president Carlos Meléndez. He served as vice president in the cabinet of Pedro José Escalón from 1 March 1903 to 1 March 1907. He was also a member of the Legislative Assembly and a presidential designate. He was Minister of Finance and Public Credit from 1 March 1923 in the cabinet of Alfonso Quiñónez Molina. He was later replaced by future vice president Gustavo Vides.

He died on 16 March 1927.
