= Manuel Enrique Araujo =

President of El Salvador from 1911 to 1913

Doctor Manuel Enrique Araujo
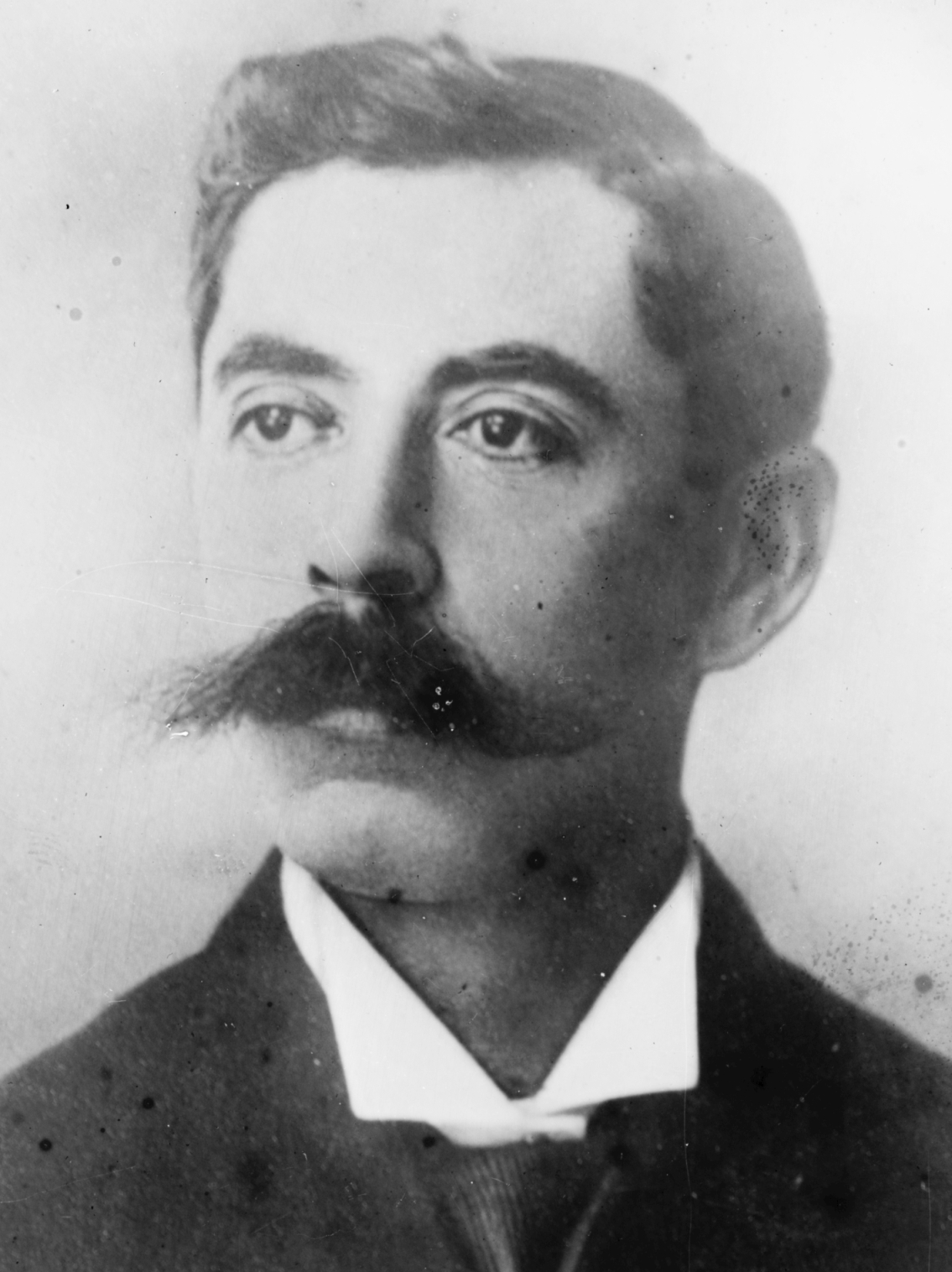
- Araujo in c. 1911–1913

21st President of El Salvador
- In office 1 March 1911 – 9 February 1913
- Vice President: Onofre Durán
- Preceded by: Fernando Figueroa
- Succeeded by: Carlos Meléndez (provisional)

16th Vice President of El Salvador
- In office 1 March 1907 – 1 March 1911
- President: Fernando Figueroa
- Preceded by: Calixto Velado
- Succeeded by: Onofre Durán

54th Mayor of San Salvador
- In office 1888
- Preceded by: Francisco A. Funes
- Succeeded by: Antonio Peralta

Personal details
- Born: Manuel Enrique Araujo Rodríguez; 12 October 1865 Estanzuelas, El Salvador
- Died: 9 February 1913 (aged 47) San Salvador, El Salvador
- Cause of death: Assassination (stab wounds)
- Party: Liberal
- Spouse: Hortensia Peralta Lagos (m. 1887)
- Children: 1
- Education: University of El Salvador
- Occupation: Politician, physician

Manuel Enrique Araujo Rodríguez (12 October 1865 – 9 February 1913) was a Salvadoran politician and physician. He served as the 21st President of El Salvador from 1 March 1911 until his death on 9 February 1913 from injuries sustained in an assassination attempt. Araujo is the only Salvadoran president to have been assassinated while in office.

Araujo studied medicine at the University of El Salvador and in Europe. He practiced medicine during the 1890s and 1900s, specializing in surgery. From 1880 to 1889, Araujo served as the mayor of San Salvador. In 1907, he was elected as Fernando Figueroa's vice president, serving from 1907 to 1911. Figueroa selected Araujo to succeed him, and in the 1911 presidential election, Araujo won with a large majority of the vote.

Araujo was inaugurated on 1 March 1911. Araujo, a pragmatic liberal, sought to portray himself as a populist and implemented several social and economic reforms. In 1912, he established the National Guard which he utilized to repress opposition to his government and support allied landowners. Araujo strongly criticized the 1912 United States' military intervention in Nicaragua.

On 4 February 1913, Araujo was attacked by three men in San Salvador with machetes and a revolver. He survived the initial attack but died to his injuries five days later on 9 February. The motives for his assassination were never determined, but the Salvadoran government believed that former vice president Prudencio Alfaro had ordered the assassination. Araujo was succeeded as president by Carlos Meléndez, who eventually formed a political dynasty that ruled El Salvador until 1927.

== Early life ==
Manuel Enrique Araujo Rodríguez was born on 12 October 1865 in Hacienda Condadillo, Estanzuelas in the department of Usulután, El Salvador. His parents were Manuel Enrique Araujo and Juana Rodríguez de Araujo; his father was Basque and his mother was Portuguese. Araujo was baptized on 22 October in the church of Tecapa (modern day Alegría). Araujo was the youngest of eight children.

Araujo studied medicine at the University of El Salvador, where he obtained a doctorate in pharmacy. After graduating, Araujo continued his studies in Paris and Vienna. Araujo specialized in surgery and actively practiced medicine during the 1890s and 1900s, performing surgeries on prostate glands and eye tumors.

Araujo was the mayor of San Salvador in 1888.

== Vice President of El Salvador ==
During the 1907 presidential election, Araujo sought to be elected as the vice president of El Salvador. He defeated his opponents with 95.47 percent of the vote; he won 146,298 votes, second-place General José Miguel Batrés won 6,689 votes, and no other candidate won more than 112 votes. Araujo was elected to serve as under president-elect Fernando Figueroa, who himself won with 99.76 percent of the vote. Both Figueroa and Araujo assumed office on 1 March 1907. Araujo succeeded Calixto Velado Eduardo as vice president.

=== 1911 presidential election ===
Araujo ran for president in the 1911 election. The Legislative Assembly wanted Araujo to select his brother Rosendo as his running mate but Araujo refused as he did not want to portray himself as establishing a political dynasty. Instead, Araujo selected Onofre Durán as his running mate. Figueroa supported Araujo's campaign, having personally selected Araujo to be his successor. While Araujo lacked the support of the military, he did have the support of the Salvadoran people. Araujo's opponents were Doctor Esteban Castro and General Luis Alonso Barahona, who had previously run for president in 1907.

Araujo won the 1911 election with 182,964 votes; the number votes received by Castro and Barahona is unknown. According to the Diario Oficial newspaper, Araujo won "a majority so considerable that it can well be called the universality of the people" ("una mayoría tan considerable que puede bien llamársele la universalidad del pueblo"). Regarding the election's conduct, historian Alastair White stated that "opponents were allowed to participate but not allowed to win". The election followed a trend of the incumbent president selecting his successor as had occurred in 1903 and 1907.

== Presidency ==
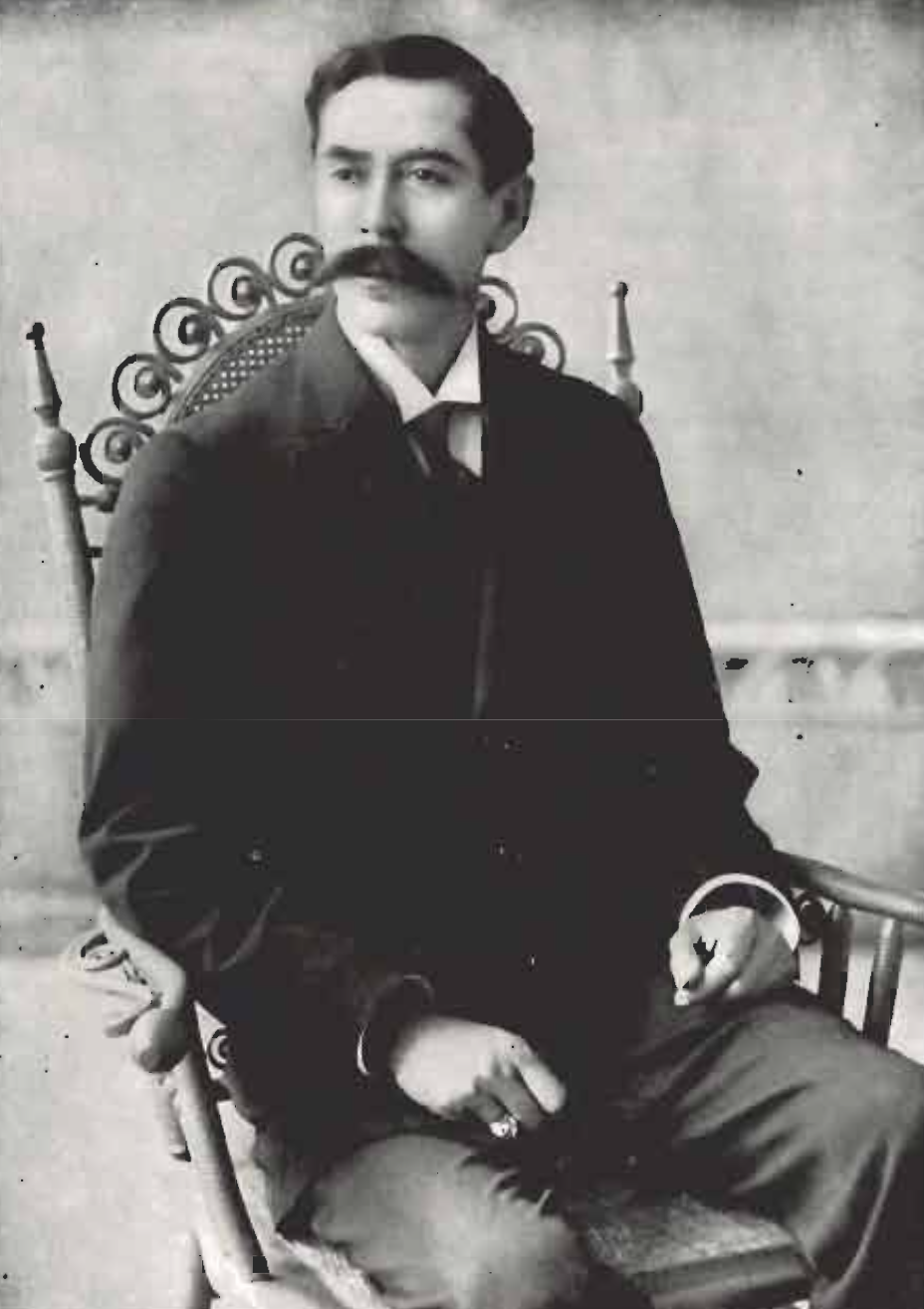
Araujo in c. 1911–1913

On 1 March 1911, Araujo and Durán assumed office as president and vice president, respectively. Araujo was the first civilian to assume the presidency since Rafael Zaldívar was deposed by the military on 14 May 1885. Araujo's cabinet consisted of Doctor Teodosio Carranza as minister of government, Doctor Rafael Guirola Duke as minister of finance, Doctor Manuel Castro Ramírez as minister of external relations, (Note: Araujo initially appointed Doctor Francisco Dueñas as minister of external relations, but Dueñas did not accept the position and Castro Ramírez assumed the office instead.) and General José María Peralta Lagos (Araujo's brother-in-law) as minister of war.

=== Reforms and public works ===
Araujo was afraid that Guatemalan president Manuel Estrada Cabrera and allied Salvadoran exiles would seek to overthrow him and he thus sought to retain high popular support within El Salvador to dissuade a potential for a coup d'état. He sought to present himself as a populist and made frequent visits to schools, prisons, and hospitals across the country. Like Araujo's predecessors, he was a pragmatic liberal, but he also received some support from the country's idealist liberals due to his reputation for respecting freedoms. Araujo was also a reformist, seeking to implement several labor reforms during his presidency.

Araujo passed the Work Accidents Law which mandated that the state and employers would share responsibility in compensating workers who were disabled in work accidents, or their families if the worker was killed, however, the law did not apply to rural laborers. Araujo restructured the country's tax system to be able to directly tax capital or property and abolished imprisonment for failing to repay debt. In an interview with Diario del Salvador's Alberto Masferrer titled "The New Ideas in the Government" ("Las Nuevas Ideas en el Gobierno"), Araujo stated that he also planned to implement an agrarian reform, establish free medical centers in rural areas, and establish mounts of piety to lend money at low interest rates, however, these reforms were never implemented.

In 1911, Araujo began construction of the National Theater in San Salvador. In commemoration of the 100-year anniversary of the 1811 Independence Movement, Araujo inaugurated the Monument to the Heroes of 1811 in the Libertad Plaza. Designs similar to the current national flag and coat of arms were adopted in 1912 during Araujo's presidency.

Prior to Araujo's presidency, the Salvadoran Army was responsible for law enforcement, and he sought to relieve the army of this responsibility. In June 1912, Araujo established the National Guard — a military-operated rural police force — and the rural patrols — paramilitary groups of peasants who were retired conscripts. Araujo's government used both the National Guard and the rural patrols to repress peasants who criticized the government, acquire intelligence on the affairs of rural El Salvador, and defend the interest of powerful landowners who supported the government politically and economically. The National Guard was modeled off the Spanish Civil Guard. Although Araujo wanted to make the National Guard separate from the army, a 1914 presidential decree declared it to be "an integral part of the army, on active service". The Salvadoran government continued to utilize the National Guard as an instrument of repression until the unit was abolished and merged into the National Civil Police in 1992. In addition to establishing the National Guard, Araujo, with the advice of Spanish military officers, also reformed the army's command structure by establishing a general staff.

=== Relations with the United States ===
Businessmen and diplomats from the United States were critical of Araujo's government for not adhering to the United States' idea of democracy by its liberal approach to social improvement in El Salvador. William Heimké, a United States envoy to El Salvador, wanted to acquire commercial privileges for American companies in El Salvador and to establish an extradition treaty, but Araujo's government refused to grant either due to Araujo's desire to avoid being dependent on any major power.

Araujo was critical of the United States' military intervention in Nicaragua to support conservative president Adolfo Díaz—a U.S. ally—against a liberal rebellion led by Luis Mena. Araujo described the intervention as "a great scandal on the whole continent". Araujo unsuccessfully sought to organize a pan-Central American military counter-intervention, as the other Central American states were wary about confronting the United States militarily. Despite this failure, Araujo continued to condemn the intervention as a violation of the 1907 Central American Treaty of Peace and Amity. U.S. president William Howard Taft sent a letter to Araujo criticizing his position on the intervention, to which Araujo responded by saying that El Salvador could determine its own foreign policy, adding "I do not obey anyone's orders" ("no obedezco órdenes de nadie"). French diplomat Auguste Jean Marc Fabre described Araujo as being Central America's "champion in resistance to U.S. encroachment", but Araujo did not consider himself to be an opponent of the United States. British envoys believed that the United States may attempt to overthrow Araujo for his anti-American sentiment.

== Assassination ==
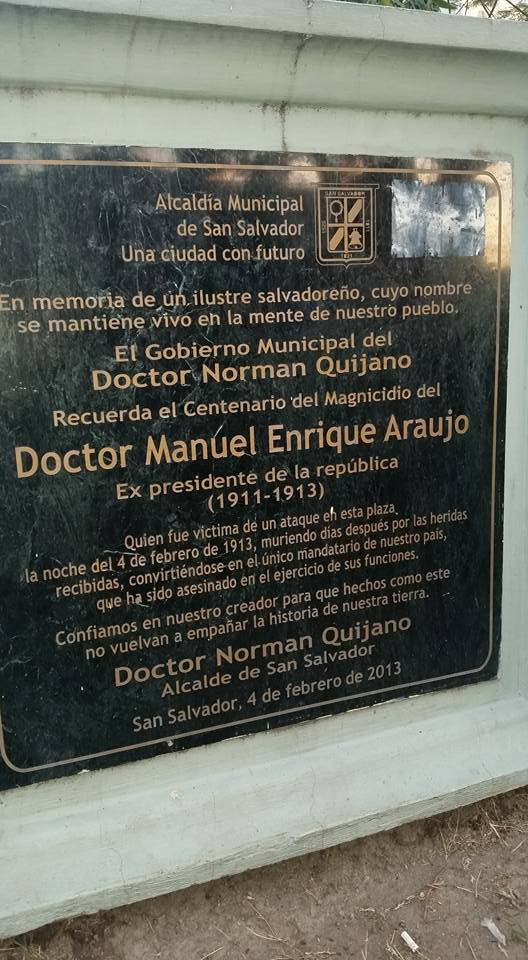
A commemorative plaque installed in 2013 at the location Araujo was attacked in 1913

During Araujo's presidency, he allowed Prudencio Alfaro, a former vice president of El Salvador, to return to the country after being in exile since his defeat in the War of 1907.

On 4 February 1913, Araujo attended a concert at the Bolívar Park (today the Gerardo Barrios Plaza) in San Salvador. Araujo attended the concert alone, without a security escort as was typical for him. At 8:30 p.m., while Araujo was sitting on a park bench with a nephew and two friends, three men attacked Araujo with machetes and a revolver. Araujo was shot once in the left shoulder and stabbed five times, with one of the wounds causing a traumatic brain injury. Araujo's friends rushed him to a pharmacy where he lost consciousness due to massive blood loss. Although seriously injured, Araujo regained consciousness and was able walk and speak. On 9 February 1913, eleven doctors operated on Araujo to remove bone splinters from his face, but his injuries had become infected. Araujo fell into a coma and died at 4 p.m., but not before receiving an anointing from Antonio Adolfo Pérez y Aguilar, the bishop of San Salvador. Before his death, Araujo forgave the men who attacked him.

Three indigenous farmers—Mulatillo Virgilio, Fabián Graciano, and Fermín Pérez—were arrested for their involvement in Araujo's assassination. Although their motive was never determined, the three men identified Major Fernando Carmona as the mastermind of the assassination. Carmona was arrested, but before he could testify, he committed suicide in prison by shooting himself with a gun. On 19 February 1913, Virgilio, Graciano, and Pérez were executed by firing squad.

Alfaro was accused of being involved in the assassination and he fled the country as a result, denying that he had any involvement; he would not return until 1915 when he was arrested and executed on 23 December 1915 for his alleged role in the assassination. Contemporary rumors also claimed that the American, Guatemalan, and Honduran governments were responsible for the assassination, but no proof substantiated the rumors. At the time, U.S. diplomats privately believed that Cabrera had ordered the assassination as he feared that Araujo sought to unite Central America under his rule. Thomas Hohler, the chargé d'affaires of the United Kingdom to El Salvador, wrote in his 1942 book Diplomatic Petrel that be believed that Araujo's assassination was carried out for "purely private reasons" rather than being politically motivated. White disagreed with Hohler's interpretation, writing that Hohler "did not know El Salvador or her politics". White believed that Araujo was "probably" assassinated on Alfaro's orders in an attempt to overthrow the pragmatic liberals.

== Legacy ==
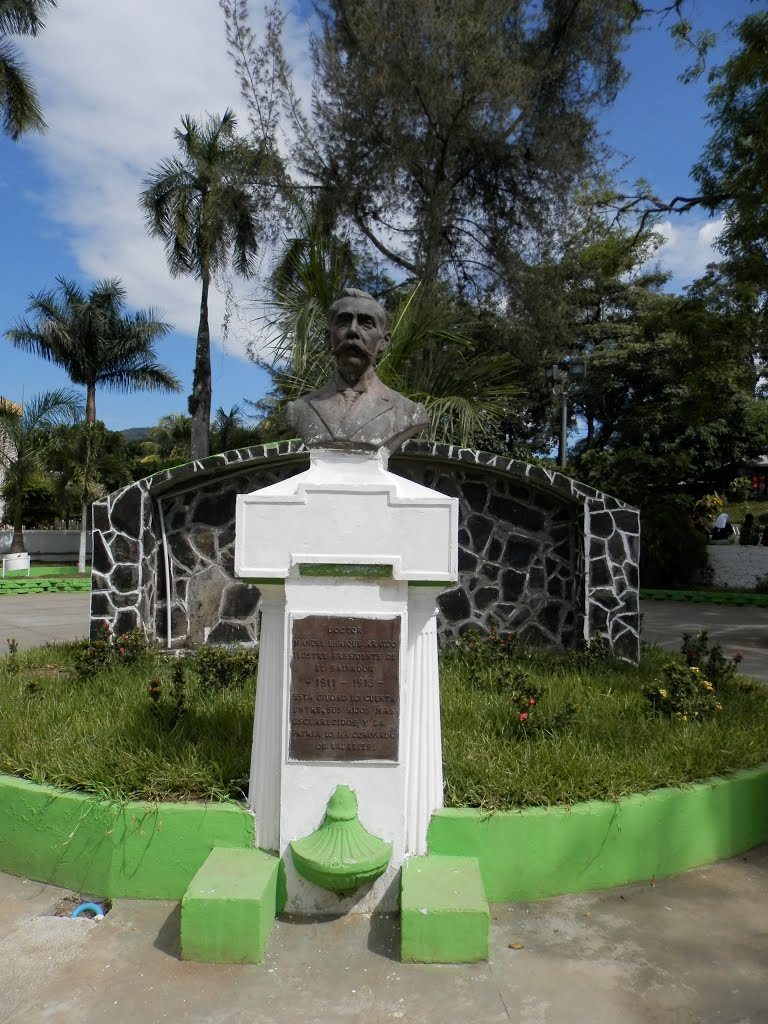
A bust of Araujo located in Usulután

On 9 February 1913, the Legislative Assembly declared 30 days of mourning. Araujo lay in state in the National Palace and the Metropolitan Cathedral of San Salvador from 10 to 12 February 1913. Araujo's funeral was held at the cathedral on 12 February 1913, and a reported 15,000 people attended. He is buried in the Cemetery of Distinguished Citizens. The Monument to the Divine Savior of the World, located in San Salvador, was built on top of a pedestal that was originally used to decorate Araujo's tomb. The statue of Jesus on top of the monument was donated by Araujo's family and the monument was unveiled on 26 November 1942. A street, Alameda Manuel Enrique Araujo, is named after him in San Salvador.

Prior to Araujo's assassination, Durán resigned from the vice presidency. As a result, Araujo was succeeded by Carlos Meléndez, the then-incumbent president of the Legislative Assembly, as he was the first presidential designate. Meléndez served as president in a provisional capacity until August 1914 when he resigned to be eligible to run in the 1915 presidential election, an election he won. Araujo's assassination led to the formation of a political dynasty led by Meléndez that would rule El Salvador until 1927. Araujo is the only Salvadoran president to have been assassinated while in office and he was referred to as the "Martyred President" after his assassination.

== Personal life ==
Araujo married María Hortensia Peralta Lagos in 1887. Peralta was a daughter of José María Peralta, who served as the acting president of El Salvador in 1859. The couple had one daughter, Conchita Araujo Peralta.

== Electoral history ==
Year	Office	Type	Party	Main opponent	Party	Votes for Araujo				Result	Swing	Ref.
Year	Office	Type	Party	Main opponent	Party	Total	%	P.	±%	Result	Swing	Ref.
1907	Vice President of El Salvador	General	Liberal	José Miguel Batrés	Military	146,298	95.47	1st	N/A	Won	Hold	
1911	President of El Salvador	General	Liberal	Luis Alonso Barahona	Military	182,964	?	1st	N/A	Won	Hold	

== See also ==
- Arturo Araujo, a distant relative who served as President of El Salvador in 1931
- List of heads of state and government who were assassinated or executed

== Notes ==
Political offices
Preceded by Francisco A. Funes	Mayor of San Salvador; 1888	Succeeded by Antonio Peralta
Preceded by Calixto Velado Eduardo	Vice President of El Salvador; 1907–1911	Succeeded by Onofre Durán Santillana
Preceded by Fernando Figueroa	President of El Salvador; 1911–1913	Succeeded by Carlos Meléndez (provisional)
