= National Press of El Salvador =

Government gazette publisher

- Imprenta Nacional de El Salvador

Agency overview
- Jurisdiction: Government of El Salvador
- Headquarters: San Salvador
- Agency executive: Sr. Luis Ernesto Flores, Director
- Parent agency: Ministry of Interior
- Website: www.imprentanacional.gob.sv

The National Press of El Salvador (Spanish: Imprenta Nacional de El Salvador) is the state institution responsible for coordinating and implementing actions for printing and publication of the country's Official Journal, in which all documents ordered by law are published. It also performs printing services requested by the public sector, legal entities, and people in the private sector.

== History ==
During the 19th century, the Government of El Salvador circulated print media with the names Gaceta Oficial, La Gaceta, El Constitucional, and Boletín Oficial. The final name Diario Oficial (Official Journal) was established on 31 December 1875. This appeared daily, and included agreements and the public budget. It also presented a summary of the week's most important events, and a brief critique.

In 1973 the Official Journal had a major administrative reform and became a department of the National Press. On 15 December 2010, by agreement of the Ministry of Interior (the National Press's parent agency) and the Salvadoran Banking Association, the Historical Archives of the Official Journal for the years 1847 to 2002 were released in digital format. El Salvador thus claimed to be the first country in Central America to have a historical digitized version of an official publication.

== Official Journal ==
Some of the documents that must appear in the Official Journal of El Salvador, by provision of the laws of the country, are:

- Laws issued by the Legislative Assembly of El Salvador; according to article 140 of the Constitution of the country.
- Agreements of fess or contributions approved by the Municipal Councils (Article 204 Cn..);
- Resolutions of the Council of Ministers communicated to the President of the Court of Auditors, to ratify the decision of the President of this body about the violation of any law or regulation, communicated to an official of the Executive Branch (Article 197 Cn..);
- Edicts of civil judges, mentioning all created with the right to an inheritance, after the appointment of administrators and representatives of succession (article 1163 Civil Code.)
- Declaration of vacant inheritance (Article 1164 CC.);
- News of the opening of succession by heirs or their legal representative (Article 1194 CC.);
- Subpoena of those who are considered disappeared prior to the declaration of presumption of death (Article 80 CC.);
- Resolution to increase capital of a corporation (Article 30 Commercial Code.)
- Notice of the application for registration of a mark at the Registry of Intellectual Property (Article 15 of the Law on Trademarks and other distinctive signs.)
