= Pedro José Escalón =

President of El Salvador from 1903 to 1907

General Pedro José Escalón
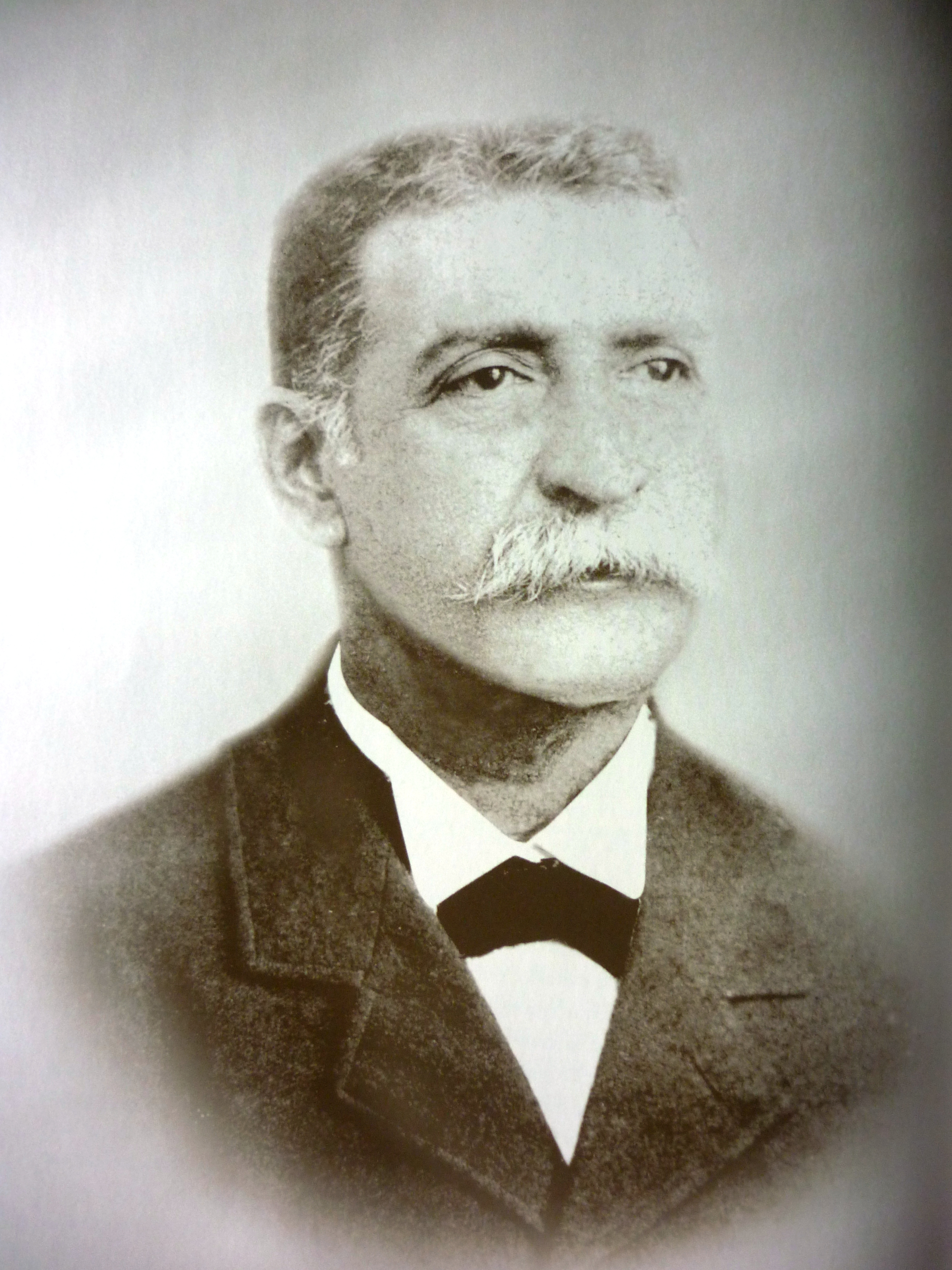

19th President of El Salvador
- In office 1 March 1903 – 1 March 1907
- Vice President: Calixto Velado
- Preceded by: Tomás Regalado
- Succeeded by: Fernando Figueroa

Personal details
- Born: 25 March 1847 Santa Ana, El Salvador
- Died: 6 September 1923 (aged 76) Santa Ana, El Salvador
- Party: Liberal
- Spouse: Elena Rodríguez (m. 1865; died 1921)
- Children: 3
- Occupation: Politician, military officer

Military service
- Allegiance: El Salvador
- Branch/service: Salvadoran Army
- Rank: General

Pedro José Escalón (25 March 1847 – 6 September 1923) was born in Santa Ana, El Salvador. In 1865 he married Elena Rodríguez (died 3 December 1921) and they had three children: Dolores, Federico and Pedro.

He served as the 19th President of El Salvador from 1 March 1903 to 1 March 1907; he was a military ruler. He died in Santa Ana on 6 September 1923, aged 76. His ascension to the presidency was the first peaceful succession in many years, ushering in an era of political stability that ended with the events of 1931–32.

== Background ==
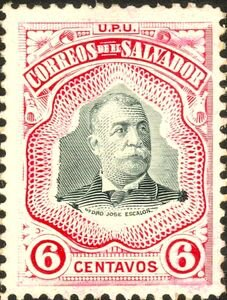
Escalón's presidency also marked the beginning of democracy in the country. It was during his term that the law began to limit each president to a maximum of four years in office.

Escalón was a landowner who held large estates. Escalón's presidency was paved by General Tomás Regalado who, in 1903, after gaining and centralizing power, transferred power to him. Escalón's presidency also marked the beginning of democracy in the country. It was during his term in office that the law of every president being allowed a maximum of four years in office was put into effect.

Political offices
Preceded by Tomás Regalado	President of El Salvador; 1903–1907	Succeeded by Fernando Figueroa
