= Francisco Antonio Reyes =

Salvadoran politician

Vice President of El Salvador
- In office 1 March 1899 – 1 March 1903
- President: Tomás Regalado
- Preceded by: Prudencio Alfaro
- Succeeded by: Calixto Velado

Personal details
- Born: Francisco Antonio Reyes Gálvez; 1860 San Vicente, El Salvador
- Died: April 1951 (aged 90–91) San Salvador, El Salvador
- Parent(s): E. Antonio Reyes and Vicenta Gálvez de Reyes

Francisco Antonio Reyes Gálvez (1860 – April 1951) was a politician from El Salvador who was Vice President of El Salvador during the presidency of Tomás Regalado.

Reyes was born in the city of San Vicente in 1860. He studied law and social sciences at the National University of El Salvador, from which he earnt his doctorate in 1889.

Reyes worked as a judge and magistrate on various occasions. In politics, he was Minister of Public Education, Minister of Foreign Affairs and Minister of Justice. In diplomatic service, he was a diplomatic representative in Central America, Mexico, and Brazil, and also plenipotentiary delegate to several Pan-American conferences. He was also a candidate for the Presidency of the Republic.

Reyes was elected Vice President of El Salvador in 1899 alongside President Tomás Regalado and served until 1903.

Reyes was elected as a member of the Legislative Assembly from Santa Ana department. He was elected President of the Legislative Assembly in 1930. He was again elected President of the Legislative Assembly during the dictatorship of Maximiliano Hernández Martínez from 1939 to 1944.

Reyes married Luz Regalado, who was a sister of President Tomás Regalado. Reyes and Regalado had children Francisco Antonio, María (de Bustamante), and María Luz. Reyes died in the first week of April 1951 in San Salvador.
