= Onofre Durán =

Salvadoran politician

Vice President of El Salvador
- In office 1 March 1911 – 9 February 1913
- President: Manuel Enrique Araujo
- Preceded by: Manuel Enrique Araujo
- Succeeded by: Alfonso Quiñónez Molina

Personal details
- Born: Onofre Durán Santillana; 25 November 1836 Ahuachapán, El Salvador
- Died: 17 November 1914 (aged 77) Ahuachapán, El Salvador
- Parent(s): José Ignacio Durán and Josefa Santillana

Onofre Durán Santillana was a politician from El Salvador who was Vice President of El Salvador during the presidency of Manuel Enrique Araujo.

Durán was born on 25 November 1836 in Ahuachapán. He studied law at the Universidad de San Carlos de Guatemala. He owned a farm in Ahuachapán. In February 1856, the Supreme Court of Justice of El Salvador appointed him to the Ahuachapán office. He was the mayor and a councilor of Ahuachapán on several occasions. He was a director of a shipping house in the port of Acajutla in 1877. He was a senior member of the board of the Ahuachapán hospital (1889-1890).

In 1892, Durán was elected President of the Legislative Assembly in 1892. In 1895, he was the co-founder of Banco de Ahuachapam. After the bank folded, the relocated to San Francisco, California, and later to Europe until 1905. In 1908 he was appointed as the governor of Ahuachapán department.

Durán was elected Vice President of El Salvador in 1911, for the administration of Manuel Enrique Araujo, who was assassinated in February 1913. When Araujo was assassinated, Durán rejected to take the office of President of El Salvador, and presidency fell to Carlos Meléndez who was one of the presidential designates.

Durán died in the city of Ahuachapán on 17 November 1914.
