= Tomás Regalado (Salvadoran politician) =

President of El Salvador from 1898 to 1903

General Tomás Regalado
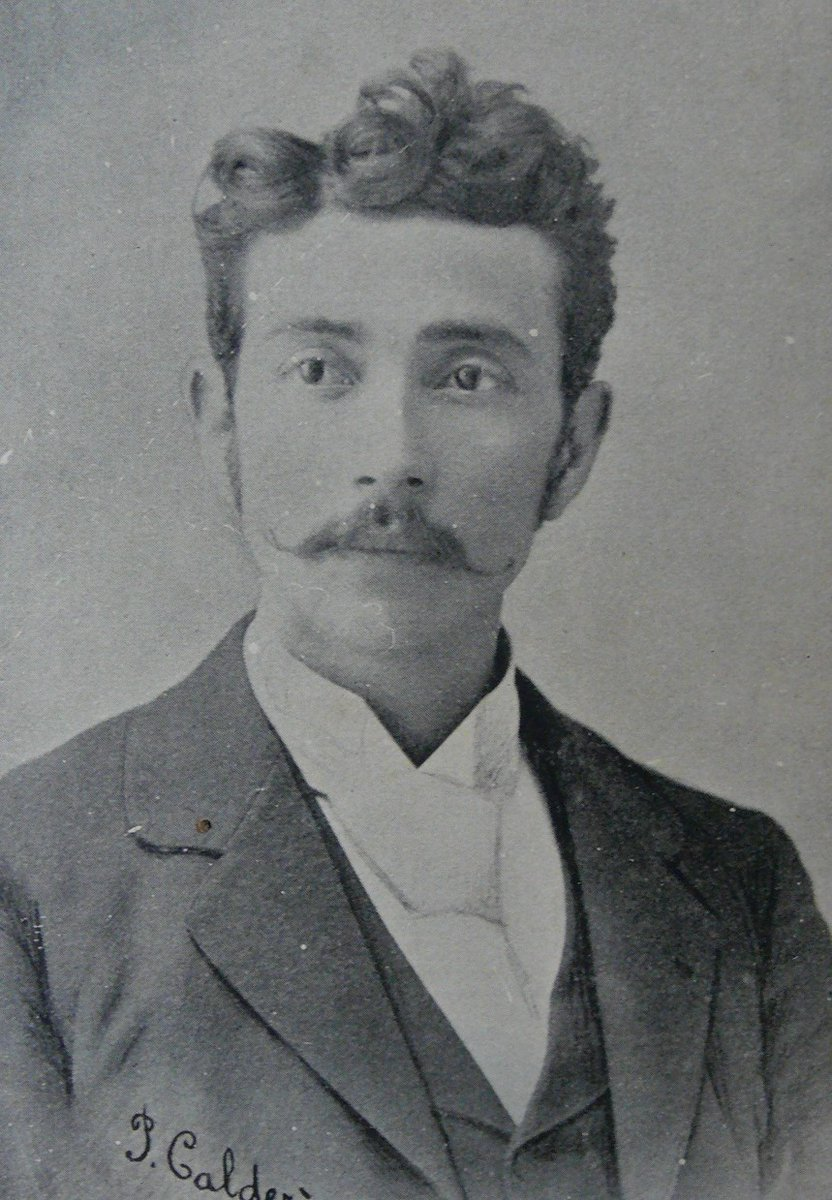

18th President of El Salvador
- In office 14 November 1898 – 1 March 1903; Provisional President until 1 March 1899
- Vice President: Francisco Antonio Reyes
- Preceded by: Rafael Antonio Gutiérrez
- Succeeded by: Pedro José Escalón

Minister of War of El Salvador
- In office 1 March 1903 – 11 July 1906
- President: Pedro José Escalón
- Preceded by: Rafael Severo López
- Succeeded by: Fernando Figueroa

Personal details
- Born: Tomás Herculano de Jesús Regalado Romero; 7 November 1860 Santa Ana, El Salvador
- Died: 11 July 1906 (aged 45) Jutiapa, Guatemala
- Party: Liberal
- Spouse: Concepción González Fortis (m. 1894)
- Children: 2
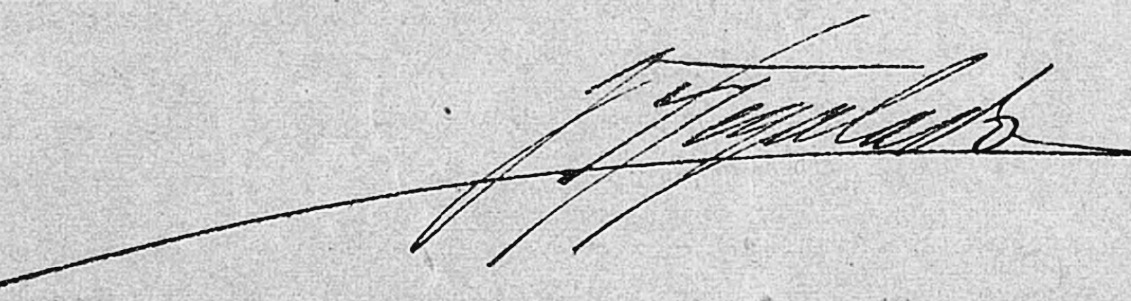
- Signature

Military service
- Allegiance: El Salvador
- Branch/service: Salvadoran Army
- Years of service: ?–1906
- Rank: General
- Battles/wars: First Totoposte War; Revolution of the 44; 1898 Salvadoran coup d'état; 1898 Izalco Revolt; Second Totoposte War; Third Totoposte War †

Tomás Herculano de Jesús Regalado Romero (7 November 1861 – 11 July 1906) was a Salvadoran military officer and politician who served as the 18th president of El Salvador from 14 November 1898 to 1 March 1903. He gained power by deposing General Rafael Antonio Gutiérrez whom Regalado had previously helped achieve control of the country by taking part in the Revolution of the 44 four years earlier. Regalado was elected to a four-year term in 1899. He promoted the construction of railways, declared an amnesty for political exiles, and began the construction of the Santa Ana Theater.

== Early life ==
Tomás Herculano de Jesús Regalado Romero was born on 7 November 1861 in Santa Ana, El Salvador. He was baptized the following day. His parents were Tomás Regalado and Petrona Romero de Regalado and he had seven siblings. Regalado married Concepción González Fortis, the daughter of former Salvadoran president Marshal Santiago González, on 8 October 1894 in Nueva San Salvador. They had two children: Tomás and Marísa.

== Political career ==
Regalado was a member of the Santa Ana municipal council in 1886 and 1889.

Upon leaving office, Regalado remained active in the Salvadoran Army and was appointed Minister of War by his handpicked successor, General Pedro José Escalón. During a war against Guatemala in 1906 he led a Salvadoran invasion force and went into battle. Seriously wounded, he soon died on 11 July.

Regalado was the last in a series of presidents who had come to power by force during the 19th Century. His peaceful transfer of power to Escalón in 1903 allowed for a degree of political stability that persisted until the 1931 Salvadoran coup d'état.

Political offices
Preceded by Rafael Antonio Gutiérrez	President of El Salvador; 1898–1903	Succeeded by Pedro José Escalón
