= Casa de Ferro =

Building in Maputo

Coordinates: 25.9704°S 32.5728°E

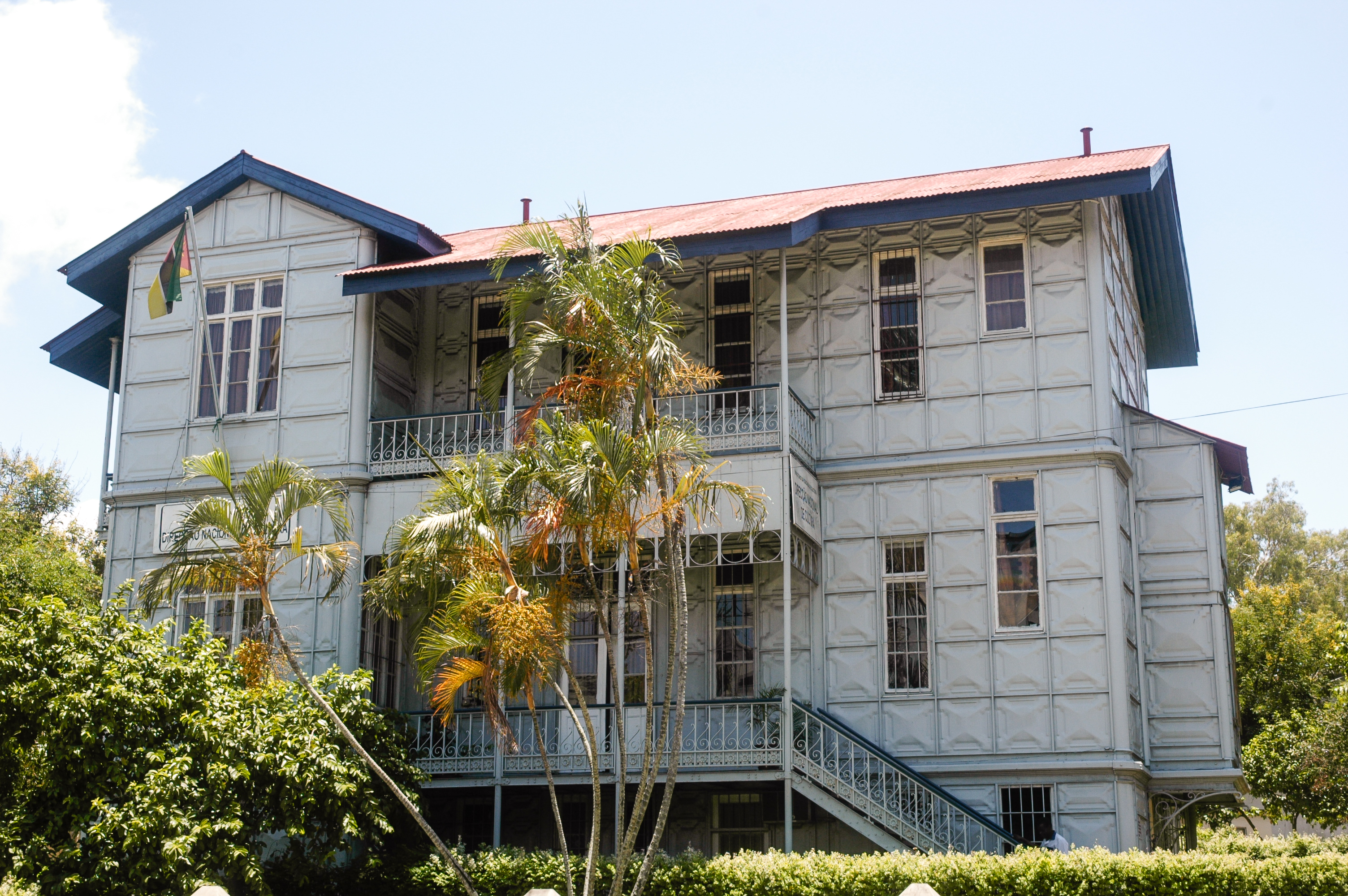
- The main façade of the building.
- Interactive map of the Casa de Ferro area

General information
- Type: House
- Location: Maputo, Mozambique, Intersection of Avenida Samora Machel and Rua Enrique de Sousa
- Completed: 1892 (assembled in Maputo)

Technical details
- Structural system: Danly system

Design and construction
- Architect: Joseph Danly

The Casa de Ferro (English: Iron House) is a historic prefabricated iron building located in Maputo, Mozambique. Originally built in Belgium, the structure was bought by the Portuguese colonial government and reassembled in 1892 in Maputo (at the time named Lourenço Marques). It was intended to serve as the residence of the Governor of the District of Lourenço Marques.

However, the building was never inhabited and has instead served as the seat of a variety of local and national institutions throughout its existence. The house is currently open to the public as a fine example of the experimental use of iron in European colonial architecture in the final decades of the nineteenth century.

== History ==
The use of iron in architecture acquired considerable popularity in the mid-to-late nineteenth century, as improvements in techniques allowed for increasingly finer castings for the employment of iron as a both decorative and structural material. The simultaneous development of prefabricated and transportable buildings further contributed to the success of iron architecture, enabling entire iron buildings to be transported in pieces across vast distances and subsequently assembled.

The colonial expansion of the late nineteenth and early twentieth centuries saw the construction of several prefabricated iron buildings in colonial contexts. Colonial administrations sought them out partly due to the fashionable nature of a construction material still perceived as a novelty within the context of domestic architecture, but also for iron's fire-retardant and damp-proof properties, strength, and durability. The Casa de Ferro is one of a handful of well-preserved surviving examples found in former Portuguese colonies of the short-lived building trend, together with the Palácio de Ferro in Luanda, Angola.

The Casa de Ferro was constructed in Belgium, in the workshops of the Societé Anonyme des Forges d'Aiseau, using a newly patented, state-of-the-art construction system developed by the Belgian engineer Joseph Danly and known as the Danly system. It was later acquired by the Portuguese government by order of the Governor-general of Portuguese Mozambique, Raphael Jácome Lopes de Andrade, to serve as the new residence for the Governor of the District of Lourenço Marques.

The house was brought in pieces to Lourenço Marques by ship together with two workers assigned to carry out the final assembly, and was erected there in 1892. The building's erection took place concurrently with the relocation of colonial offices and institutions from the Island of Mozambique (the historical capital of Portuguese Mozambique) to the southern settlement of Lourenço Marques (now Maputo), which had been elevated to the status of city in 1887 and would become the new capital of the colony in 1898.

However, the Governor of the District rejected the idea of residing in the Casa de Ferro soon after its completion. According to popular belief, the decision was motivated by the insufferable heat produced by the iron's prolonged exposure to the tropical sun. However, research has established that the climate was a minor, if not outright irrelevant, factor in the unexpected turn of events, with the Governor's preference for a more traditionally constructed building playing a much more substantial part.

Upon completion the structure was provisionally used as a court. In 1893, mere months after its construction, the Governor-general donated it to António Barroso, the Catholic Prelate of Mozambique. Barroso converted the house into the seat of the newly established Instituto de Ensinho Rainha Dona Amélia, a missionary institute for female education. In 1910 the Instituto Dona Amélia ceased to exist; consequently, the Casa de Ferro changed hands again and became a school run by the Sociedade de Instrução e Beneficiência 1° de Janeiro. The building subsequently went on to house colonial offices, specifically the Serviços de Agrimensura (land surveying services).

In 1966 the structure was moved from its original location on Avenida 5 de Outubro to its present placement at the intersection of Avenida Samora Machel and Rua Enrique de Sousa, adjacent to the Tunduru Gardens. In 1974, after the end of the Mozambican War of Independence, the Casa de Ferro served as the provisional seat of the FRELIMO political party, and later as the headquarters of the Ministry of Culture's Arquivo do Património Cultural (ARPAC). Restored in 2014, the building is still used to this day to house offices of the Ministry of Culture, but is open to visitors.

== Architecture ==
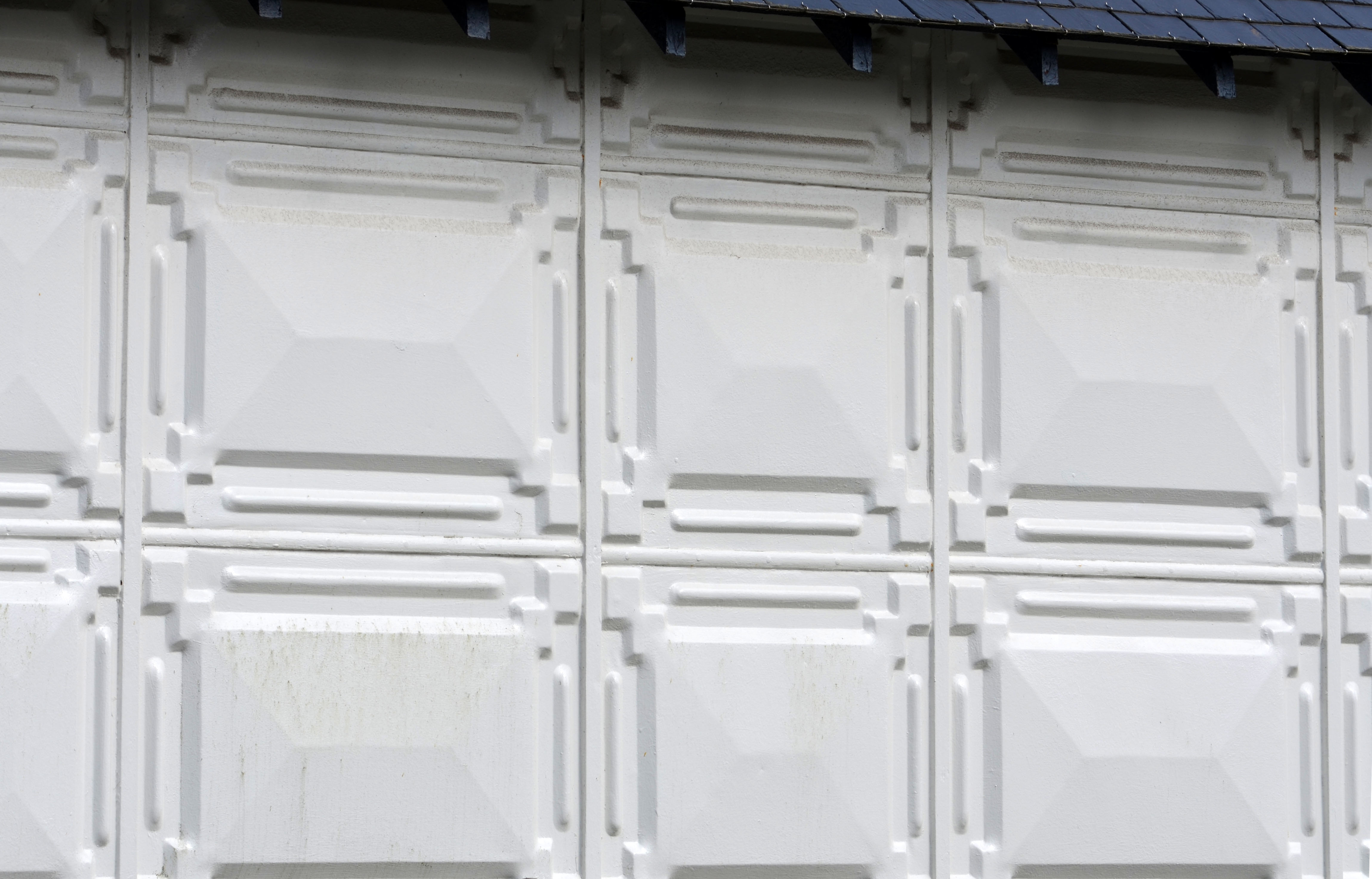
Detail of the exterior of Villa Ker ar Bruck in Crozon, France, constructed with the Danly system. Note the design of the panels, identical to that of the Casa de Ferro.

Similarly to the Peruvian Casa de Fierro (also by Joseph Danly), the Casa de Ferro is sometimes erroneously described as the work of renowned architect Gustave Eiffel. However, claims that the building was designed by Eiffel are unfounded.

Buildings constructed according to the Danly system feature a wrought iron structure, with cast iron connecting pieces and thin, embossed iron cladding panels with convex geometrical designs which serve both decorative and structural functions. The iron panels are mounted both on the inside and on the outside of the frame, leaving a clear internal space and thus allowing air to circulate freely inside the walls; internal ventilation is further ensured by holes pierced on the interior panels close to the ceilings, as well as by the numerous windows in each room. No foundations are needed for houses built with the Danly system, as the lightweight structures are simply mounted on top of an iron frame laid upon the ground; this made the construction and the later relocation of the Casa de Ferro simple and fast processes.

The abundance of design features allowing for air movement in Danly's buildings demonstrate that they were intended for hot climates; in fact, the Belgian engineer developed his system specifically for use in the colony of Belgian Congo. The Danly system, regarded as highly sophisticated in comparison with other prefabricated iron building systems of that era, had considerable success in Latin America and was extensively employed in countries such as Peru, Brazil, and Mexico; at the time of the construction of the Casa de Ferro, the system was also very popular in Portuguese Mozambique.

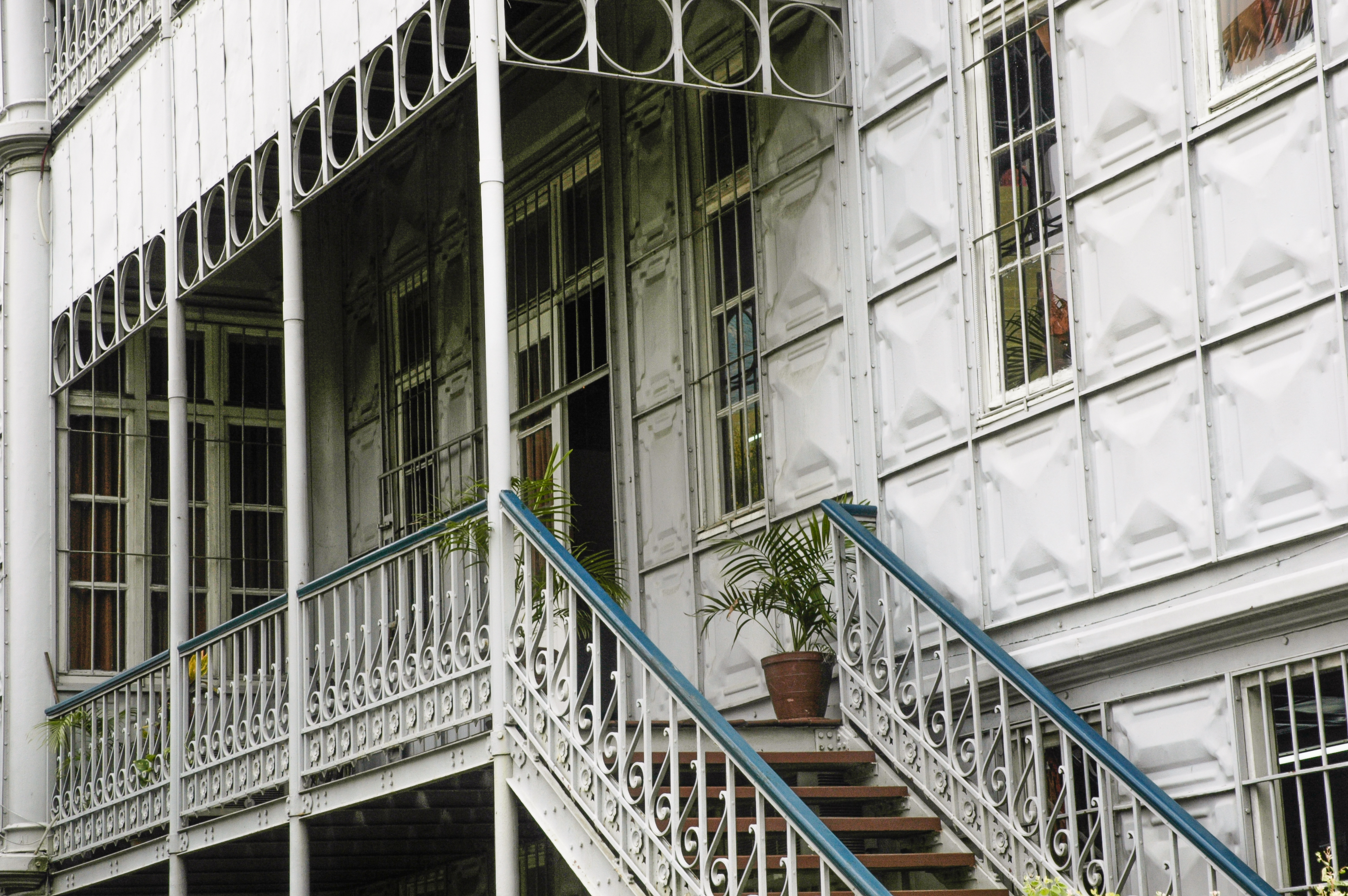
The façade portico.

Eclectic in style, the Casa de Ferro has a design reminiscent of Victorian architecture, blending with Maputo's other late nineteenth-century colonial buildings, which were largely influenced by South African architecture. It features an irregular rectangular plan and is three stories tall, with a cross gable roof. The main entrance, which opens on a two-story portico, is on the second story, and is reached through an external flight of steps; a set of two superimposed balconies and a two-story protruding bay, all supported by curved brackets, can be found respectively on the elevations facing north-west and south-east. Apart from the brackets, few other ornamentations adorn the exterior; the building's main decorative element is the ubiquitous geometric design of the gray-painted iron panels, which is repeated throughout both the exterior and the interior of the house.

== See also ==
- Cast-iron architecture
