= Joseph Danly =

Belgian engineer and businessperson

Joseph Barbe Léonard Danly
- Born: 19 March 1839; Marcinelle, Belgium
- Died: 1899
- Occupation: Engineer

Joseph Barbe Léonard Danly (19 March 1839 – 1899) was a Belgian engineer and businessperson. The operator of a forge in Aiseau, Belgium, in the 1880s he patented a construction system for prefabricated iron buildings known as the Danly system. Considered to be highly sophisticated in comparison with other prefabricated iron building systems of that era, the Danly system was originally intended for use in the colony of Belgian Congo, but was also extensively used in other African colonies as well as in Latin America.

== Life and career ==
Joseph Barbe Léonard Danly was born in Marcinelle on 19 March 1839. He attended the University of Liège, earning a degree in mining engineering. In 1863, together with his brother Louis, a banker, Joseph bought a forge located in Aiseau and developed it into a manufacturing facility for the production of railway equipment. After Louis's death in 1883, Joseph decided to embark on a new, more profitable activity, and took advantage of the presence of stamping and galvanizing workshops in the forge to experiment with the production of prefabricated iron buildings.

In July 1885 Joseph was granted in Belgium his first patent, titled La construction de bâtiments en tôles embouties ("The Construction of Buildings in Stamped Sheet Metal"). Later that same year, he founded the Societé Annonyme des Forges d'Aiseau, a public limited company, and took part with his patent in the Antwerp International Exposition, where he exhibited a project for mobile iron ambulance huts in a competition held by the International Committee of the Red Cross, winning second place. The huts Joseph Danly showcased at the Antwerp fair had a simple design and were made of iron panels with edges folded at 90 degrees, mounted together without a supporting frame. Joseph soon realized the necessity to upgrade his system to allow for the construction of larger, taller buildings, and in 1887 he was granted an improvement patent, describing what we know today as the Danly system.

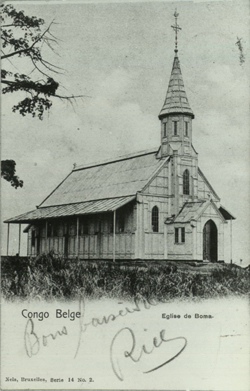
The iron church of Boma, second capital of the Congo Free State, in a period postcard. The structure was inaugurated on 19 April 1891.

Several factors were contributing to the growing interest for prefabricated metal buildings in the final decades of the 19th century. Above all, the gold rushes in North America and Australia, soon followed by the colonial expansion in Africa and Asia, prompted a demand for construction materials that could be easily transported across long distances and through arduous terrain. Moreover, the tropical climate of most European colonies required building materials that could withstand rot, insect and rodent damage, and fire. Iron soon became widely appreciated for its fire-retardant and damp-proof properties, strength, and durability.

Joseph intended his improved building system to be employed in the newly established Congo Free State, where it was in fact used to construct, among other structures, the first church of Boma. However, his prefabricated iron buildings were also extensively sold to other European colonial administrations (see, for example, the Casa de Ferro, acquired by the Portuguese government by order of the Governor-general of Portuguese Mozambique and erected in Maputo) or to privates (for instance, see the Casa de Fierro, bought by the Bolivian explorer and entrepreneur Antonio Vaca Diez and assembled in Iquitos, Peru).

After the 1887 improvement patent, another identical patent was issued in France. It was operated by the Société des forges et fonderies d'Hautmont (Nord), which had a manufacturing license for the production and distribution of buildings constructed with the Danly system in France and in its colonies. However, the Hautmont company ultimately produced a negligible quantity of buildings compared to the much more successful Societé Annonyme des Forges d'Aiseau. Joseph Danly died in 1899, and his son Albert Marie Joseph Danly (1867 – 1908) continued to operate the factory. However, financial difficulties soon arose, and the company ceased to exist in 1906.

== The Danly system ==
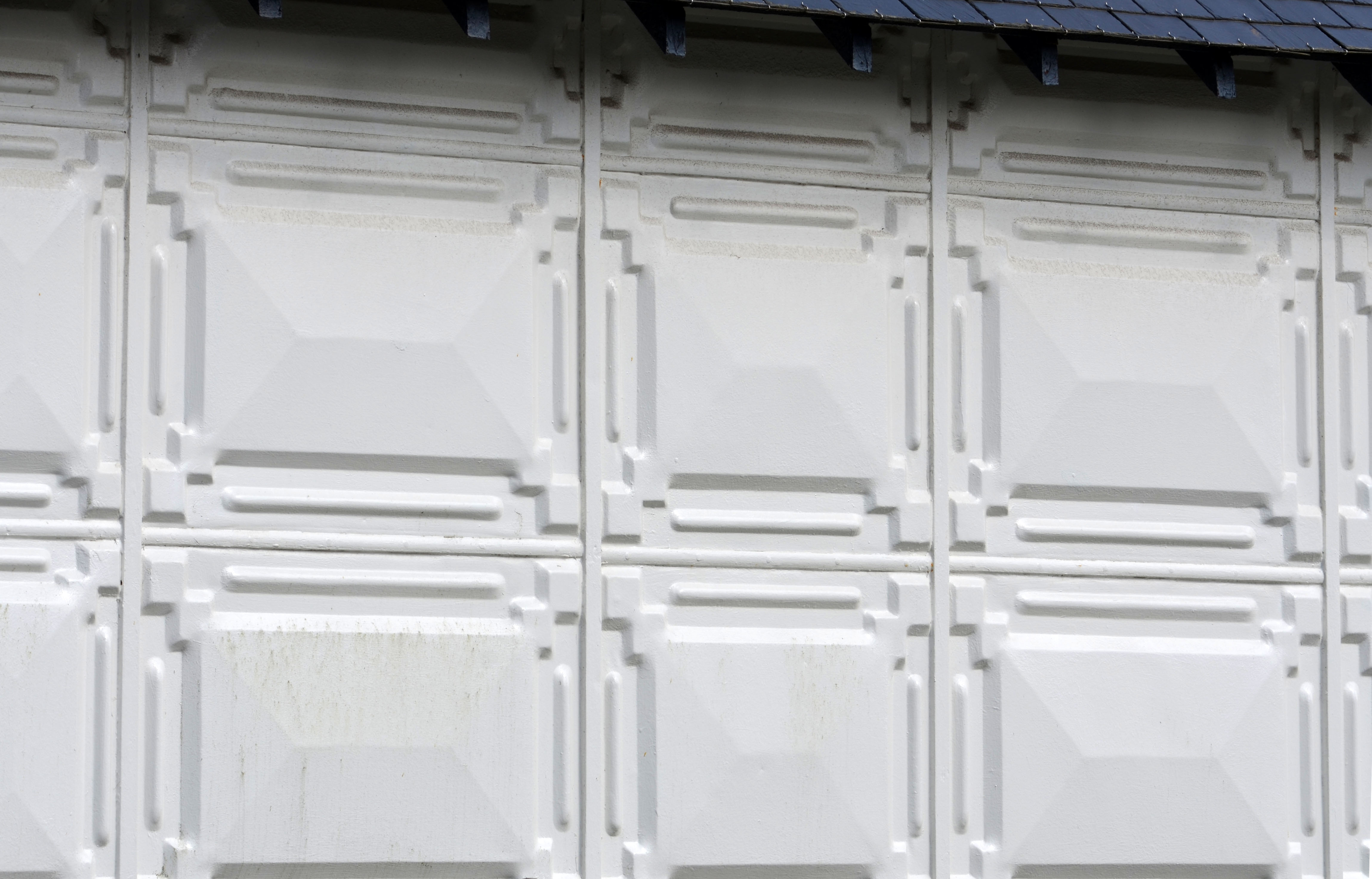
Detail of the exterior of Villa Ker ar Bruck in Crozon, France, constructed with the Danly system.

Buildings constructed according to the Danly system featured a wrought iron structure, with cast iron connecting pieces and thin, galvanized and embossed iron cladding panels. The panels had edges folded at 90 degrees with holes for the bolts, and featured convex geometrical designs serving both decorative and structural functions. The wrought iron structural frame, introduced with the 1887 improvement patent, allowed for the erection of elaborate and complex buildings, often two stories tall; smaller, single-story buildings featured a relatively lighter frame, made of small vertical T-beams.

The improvement patent also introduced a series of building features aimed at providing ventilation in the face of the warm, humid climate of the Congo Basin. The iron panels were mounted both on the inside and on the outside of the frame, leaving a clear internal space and thus allowing air to circulate freely within the exterior walls; internal ventilation was further ensured by holes pierced on the interior panels close to the ceilings and to the floors, as well as by numerous windows. A partial exception to this were the structures constructed by the Société des forges et fonderies d'Hautmont, which often had the interior layer of the building envelope made of wood or bricks instead of metal.

Buildings constructed with the Danly system featured a metal roof, often elaborate in design, which was made of metal sheets bolted to an iron frame; however, the patents contain no description of the frame itself. No foundations were needed for houses built with the Danly system, as the lightweight structures were simply mounted on top of an iron frame laid upon the ground.

Upon order, individual buildings were manufactured and then mounted in Aiseau, before being dismantled and shipped to destination. Structures constructed with the Danly system were advertised as quick to assemble and disassemble without the need for specialized workers. Indeed, in colonial contexts the assembly of those buildings was often carried out by local labourers under the supervision of one or two technicians sent from Aiseau, as was the case for the church of Boma.

The Danly system, regarded as highly sophisticated in comparison with other prefabricated iron building systems of that era, was widely employed in the Congo Free State, but had considerable success also in other African colonies, such as Portuguese Mozambique, as well as in Latin America, where it was extensively employed in countries such as Chile, Peru, Brazil, El Salvador, Costa Rica, and Mexico.

== Buildings constructed with the Danly system ==
Unless otherwise indicated, the date refers to the completion of the final assembly of the structure.

=== France ===
- Théâtre des Folies Parisiennes for the Universal Exposition in Paris (1889; dismantled)
- Pavilion for the Universal Exposition in Paris (1889; after the fair, reassembled at the Pebeco foundry in Port-Brillet)
- Villa Ker ar Bruck, Crozon (1889)
- Villa Hamlet, Arcachon (1894)
- Église Saint Auguste, Vendin-le-Vieil (1894; destroyed during World War I or dismantled)
- Maison électrique for the 1895 Bordeaux Exposition (1895; dismantled)
- Iron house, Poissy (1896; destroyed by a storm in 1999, reconstructed in 2020)
- Iron house, Jarville-la-Malgrange (year unknown)
- Chapelle Saint-Jean-Baptiste, Bagnoles-de-l'Orne (year unknown; dismantled in 1933 and partially repurposed as an agricultural barn in Saint-Ouen-le-Brisoult and a smaller building in Juvigny Val d'Andaine)
- Maison Caillet et Gronow, Puteaux, Paris (year unknown; dismantled)
- Hut near the Seine in Puteaux, Paris (year unknown; dismantled)

=== Africa ===
- Cathedral of San Jose, Malabo, Equatorial Guinea (1890; dismantled in 1930)
- Church of Boma, Democratic Republic of the Congo (1891; partially reassembled in its present location in 1952)
- Casa de Ferro, Maputo, Mozambique (1892; reassembled in its present location in 1966)
- Residence of the Governor-General, Boma, Democratic Republic of the Congo (year unknown)

=== Latin America ===
==== Brazil ====
- Bananal Railway Station, Bananal (1889)
- São João public market, São Paulo (1890; reassembled in a new location circa 1914; dismantled circa 1924)
- Chalet in the Belém campus of the Federal University of Pará, Belém (1893)
- Armazém 15 (port warehouse), Manaus (year unknown)
- Chalé do Bosque, Belém (year unknown; reassembled in its present location in 1985)
- Chalet of the Imprensa Oficial do Estado do Pará, Belém (year unknown; dismantled in 1987, with pieces stored at the Federal University of Pará campus)

==== Other countries ====
- Church of Guayacán, Chile (1889)
- Casa de Fierro, Iquitos, Peru (1890)
- Villa Julia, Caracas, Venezuela (1892)
- Palacio de Hierro, Orizaba, Mexico (1894)
- Escuela Buenaventura Corrales, San Jose, Costa Rica (1896)
- Chapel of the Hospital Nacional Rosales, San Salvador, El Salvador (1900)
- Hospital Nacional Rosales, San Salvador, El Salvador (1902)
- Hospicio de Huérfanos, San Salvador, El Salvador (year unknown)

== Gallery ==
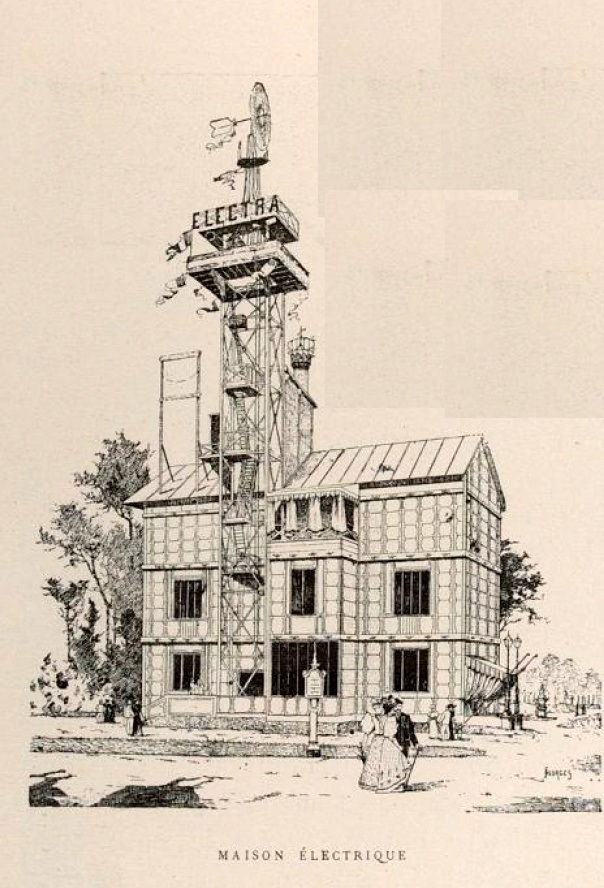
Drawing of the maison électrique showcased at the 1895 Bordeaux Exposition.

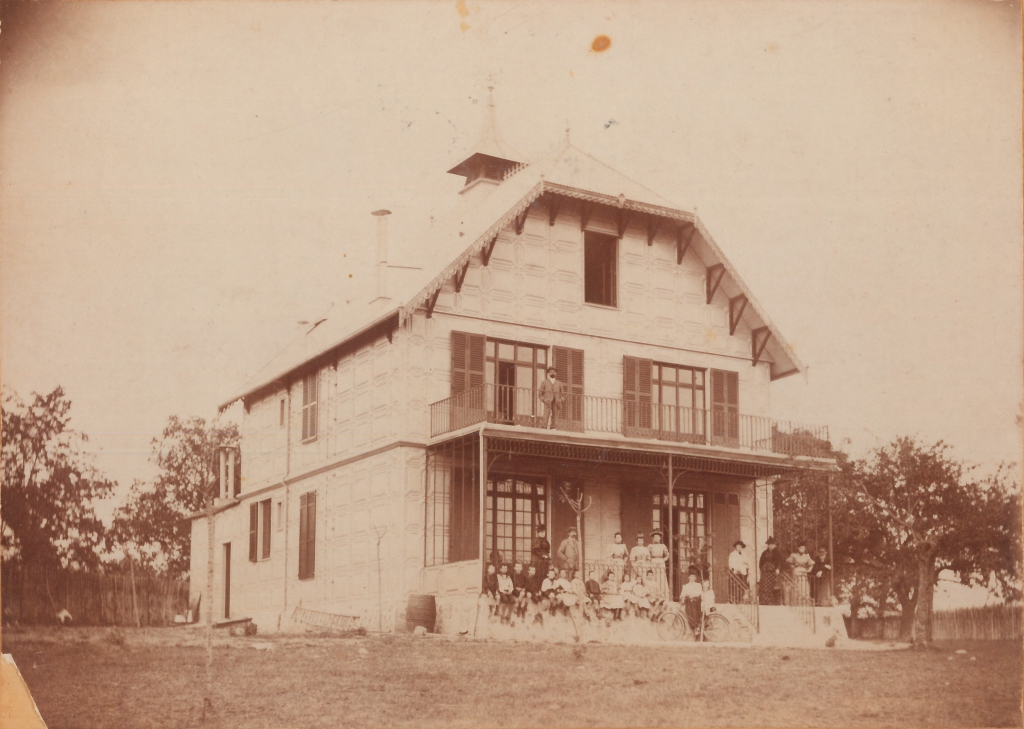
The iron house in Poissy, France shortly after completion.

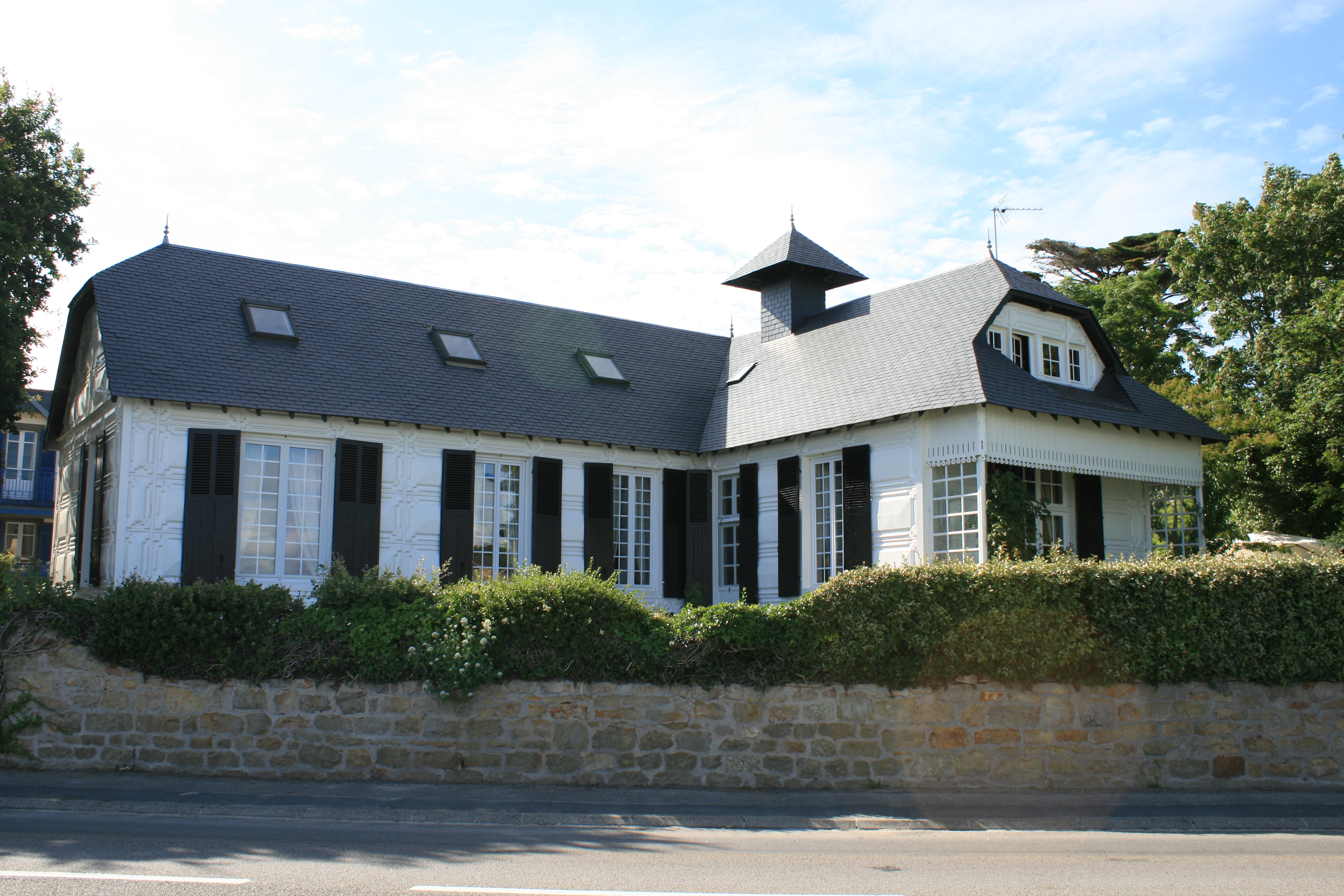
Villa Ker ar Bruck, Crozon, France.

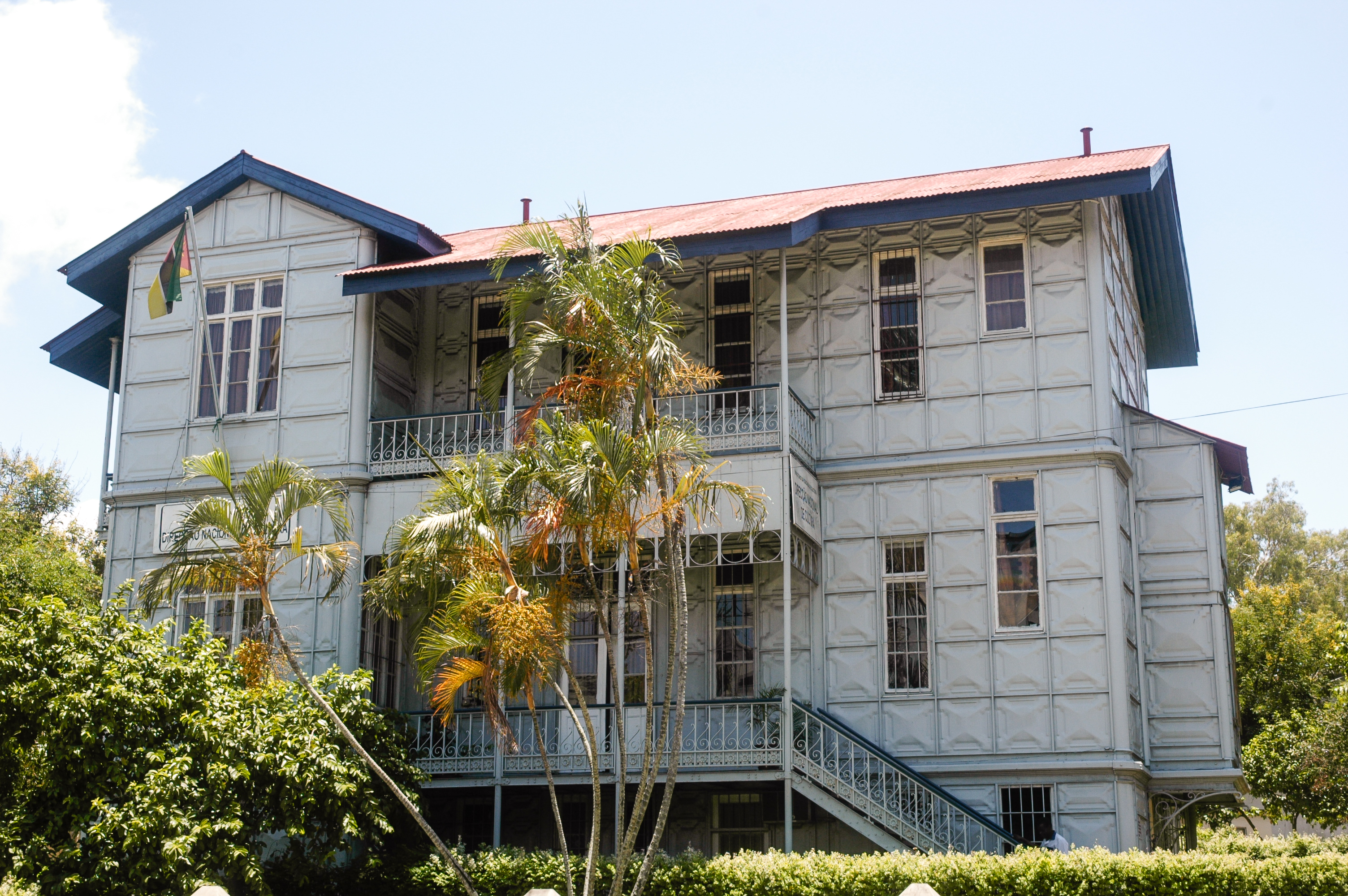
Casa de Ferro, Maputo, Mozambique.

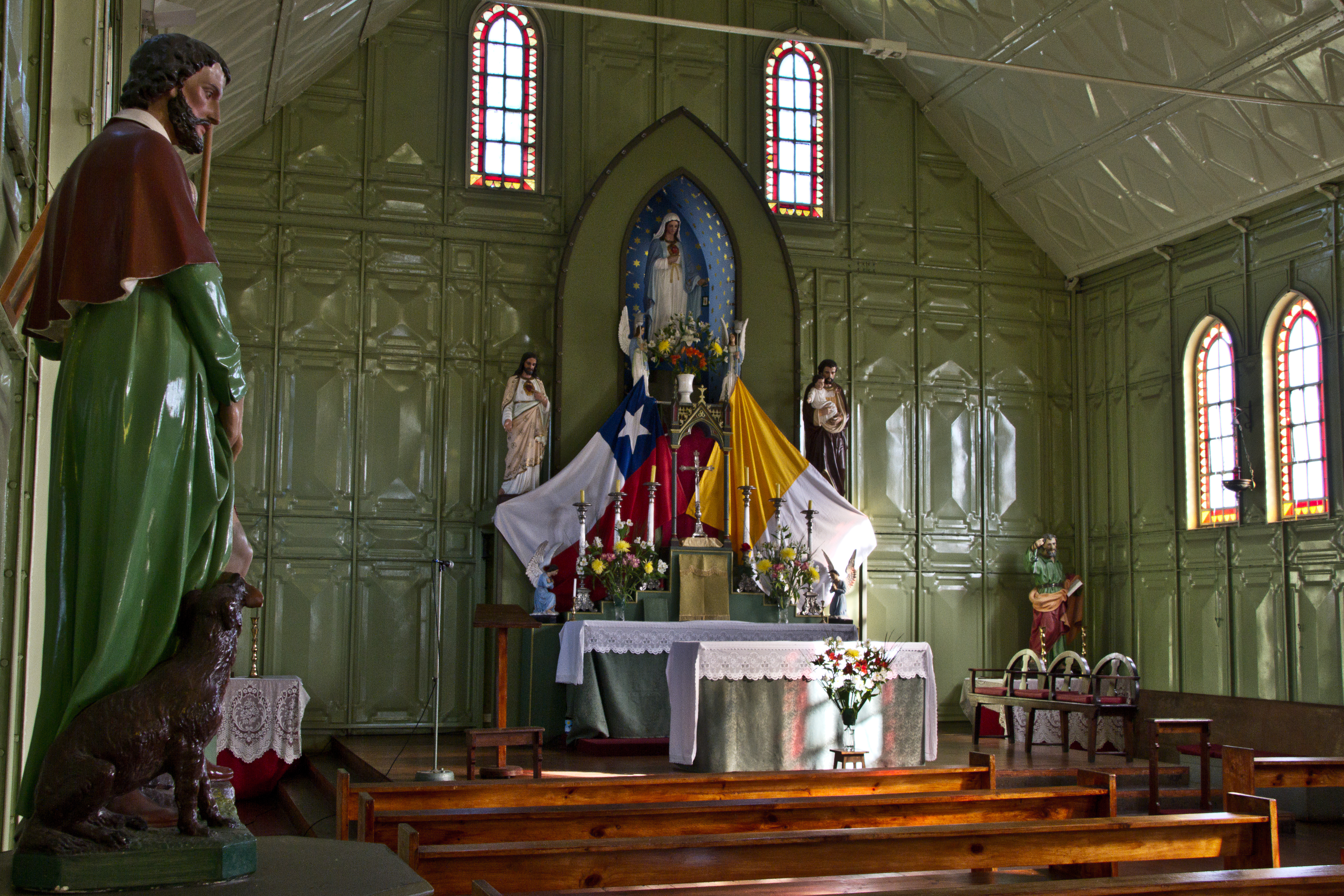
Interior of the church of Guayacán, Chile.

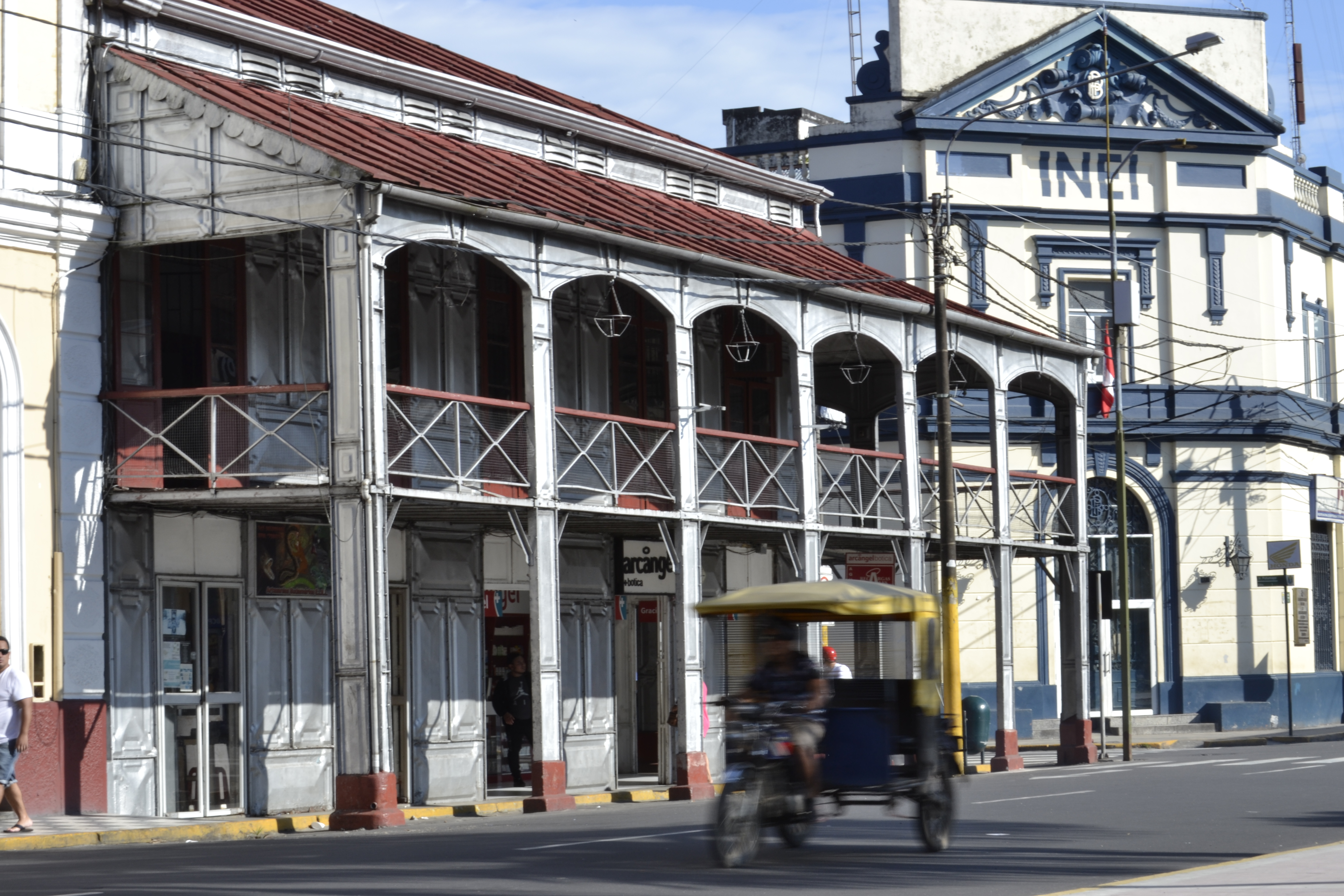
Casa de Fierro, Iquitos, Peru.

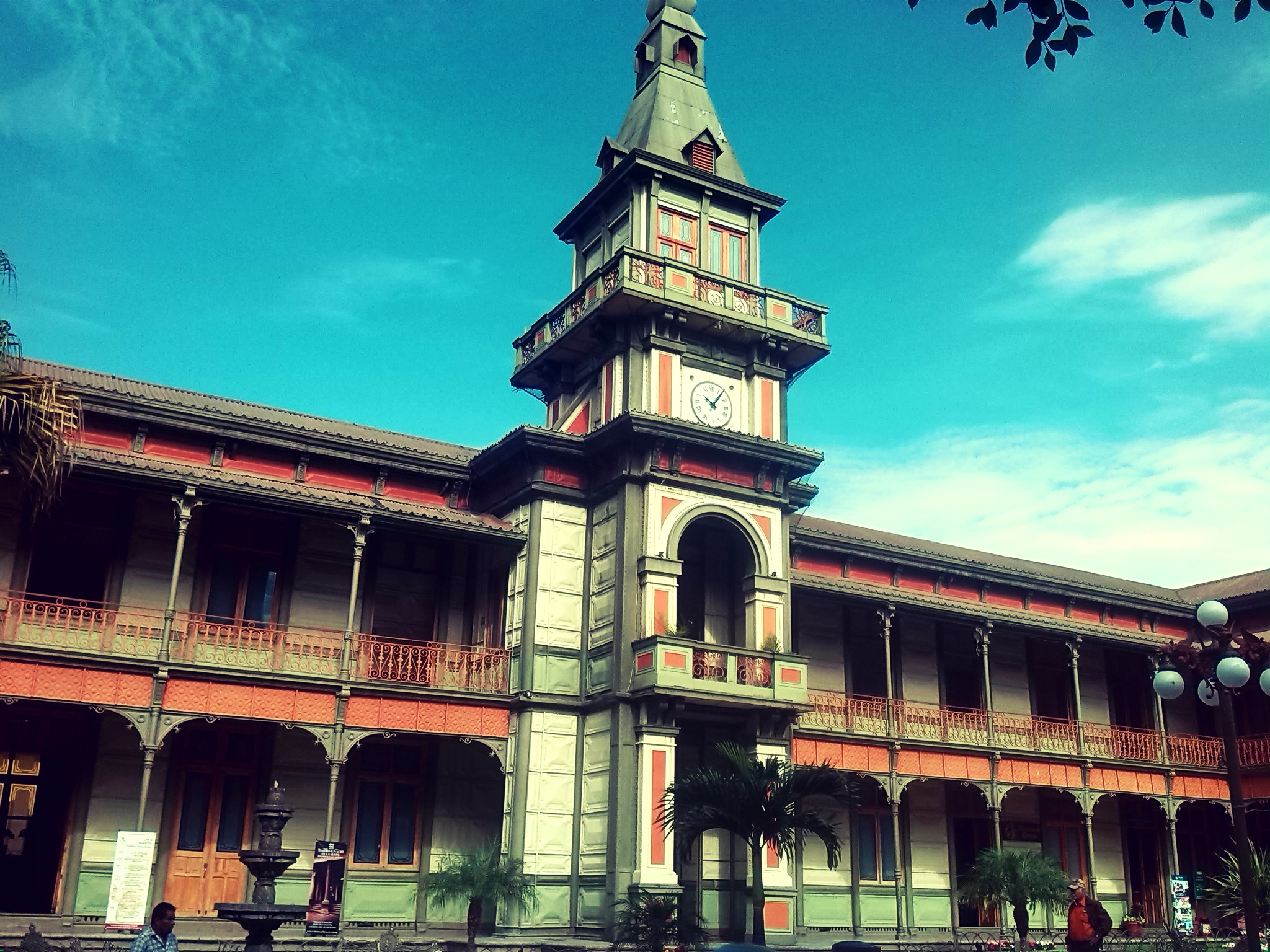
Palacio de Hierro, Orizaba, Mexico.

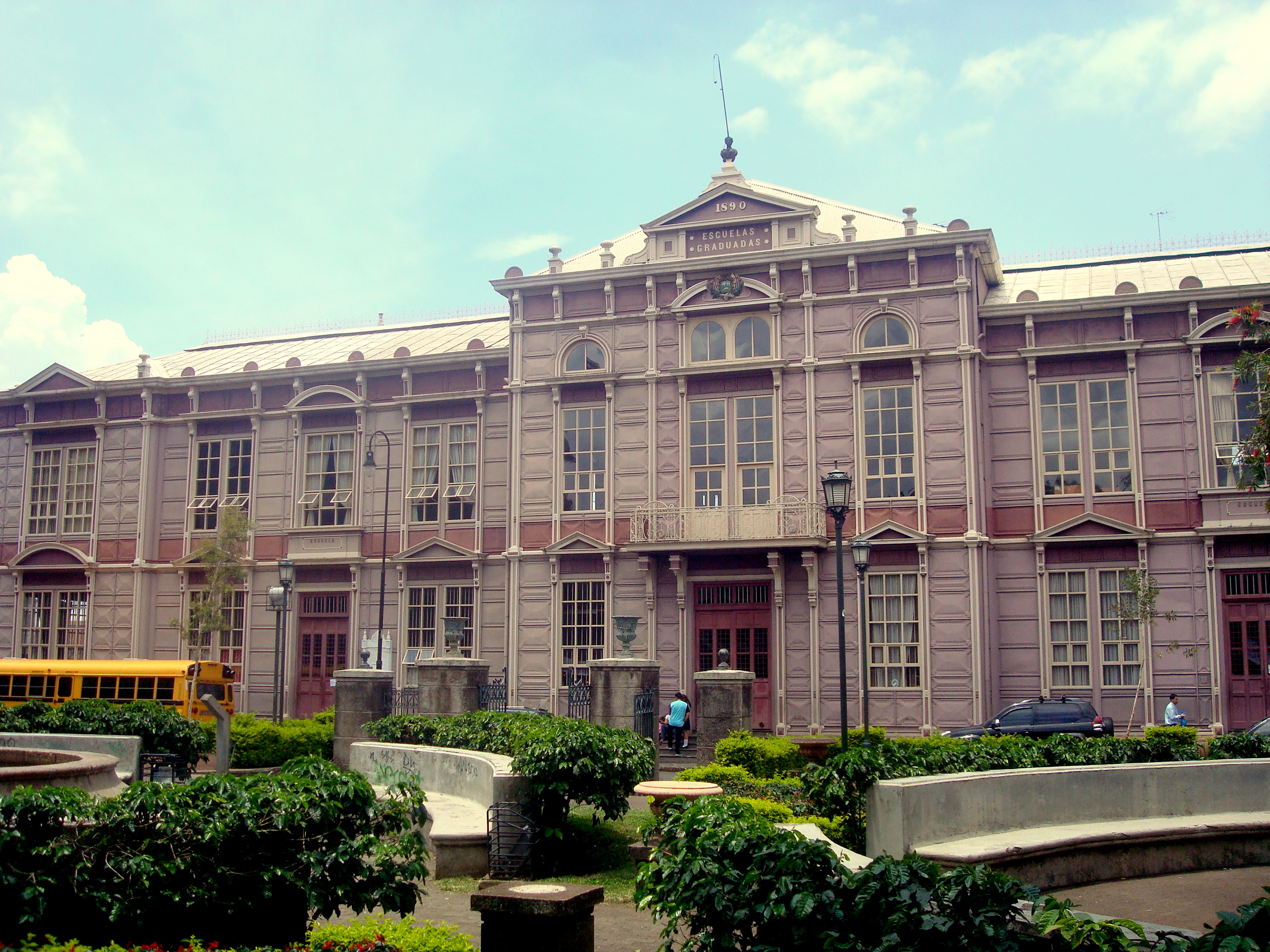
Escuela Buenaventura Corrales, San José, Costa Rica.

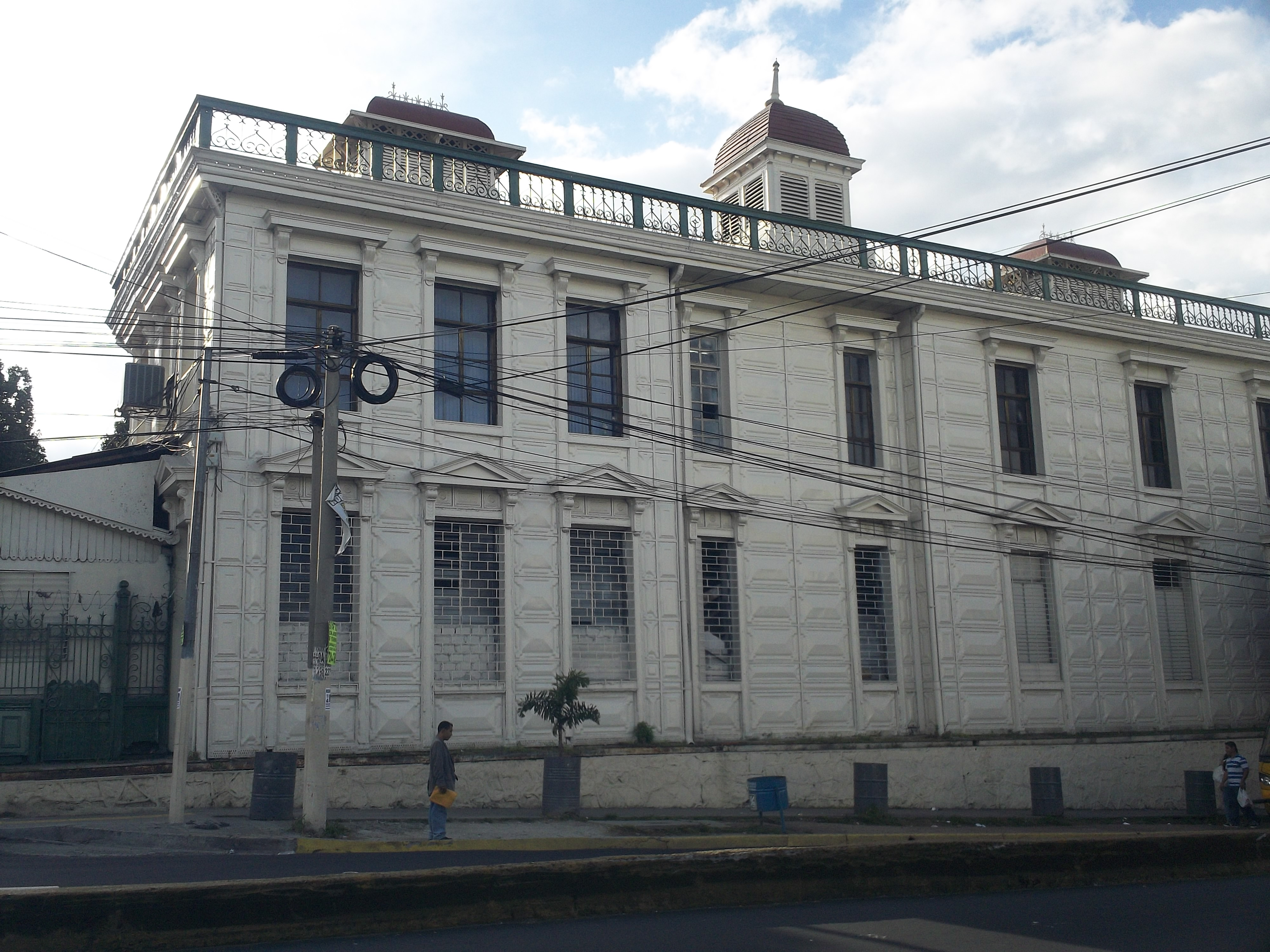
The main building of the Hospital Nacional Rosales, San Salvador, El Salvador.

== See also ==
- Cast-iron architecture
