= Hospital Rosales =

Hospital in San Salvador

National Hospital Rosales
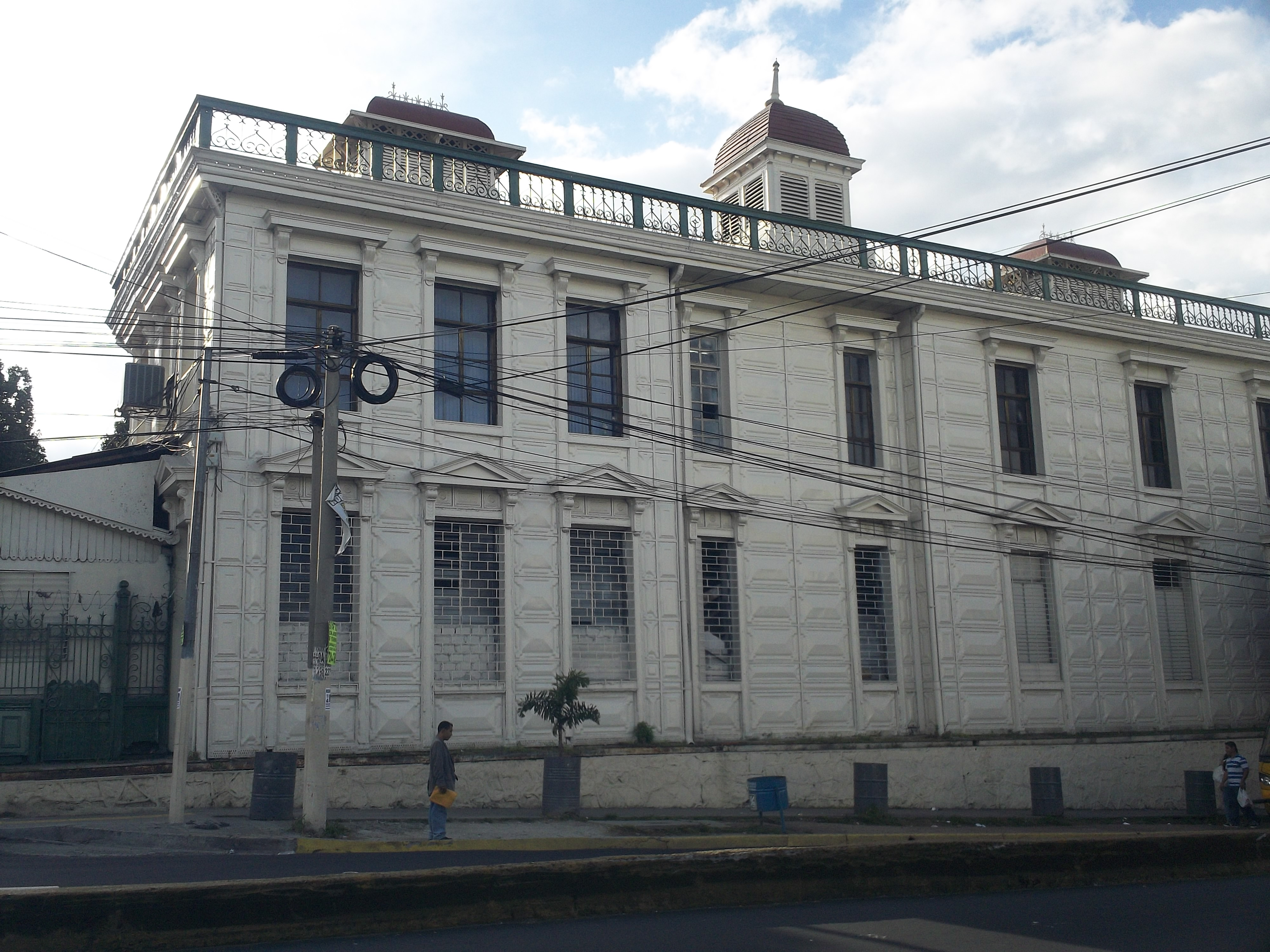
- Hospital Rosales in 2013

Geography
- Location: San Salvador, El Salvador
- Coordinates: 13°42′02″N 89°12′24″W

History
- Constructed: 12 April 1891; 135 years ago
- Opened: 13 July 1902; 124 years ago

National Hospital Rosales (Spanish: Hospital Nacional Rosales) is a hospital located in San Salvador, El Salvador.

== History ==
In 1883, French architect and artilleryman Joseph Albert Touflet created plans to build a new general hospital in San Salvador. The Society of Saint Vincent de Paul helped negotiate the donation of land on a hill west of San Salvador to build the hospital. When José Rosales, a former president of El Salvador and businessman, died on 6 April 1891, his will allocated 500,000 pesos to help finance the hospital as Rosales had "no legal heirs" ("al no tener herederos forzosos"). Construction began a few days later on 12 April.

Salvadoran president Pedro José Escalón inaugurated the completed hospital on 13 July 1902 and named it in Rosales' honor. Several of El Salvador's first medical procedures occurred at Hospital Rosales, including the first caesarean section in 1917, brain tumor removal in 1918, and heart suture in 1929.

In 1989, the Legislative Assembly declared part of the hospital to be a national monument. In 2008, the hospital handled 6,500 patients monthly and had 1,800 employees. Salvadoran president Salvador Sánchez Cerén initiated renovations of Hospital Rosales. In 2023, President Nayib Bukele began new construction at Hospital Rosales which health minister Francisco Alabí said would triple the hospital's capacity. Bukele inaugurated the renovated Hospital Rosales on 1 June 2026.

== Architecture ==
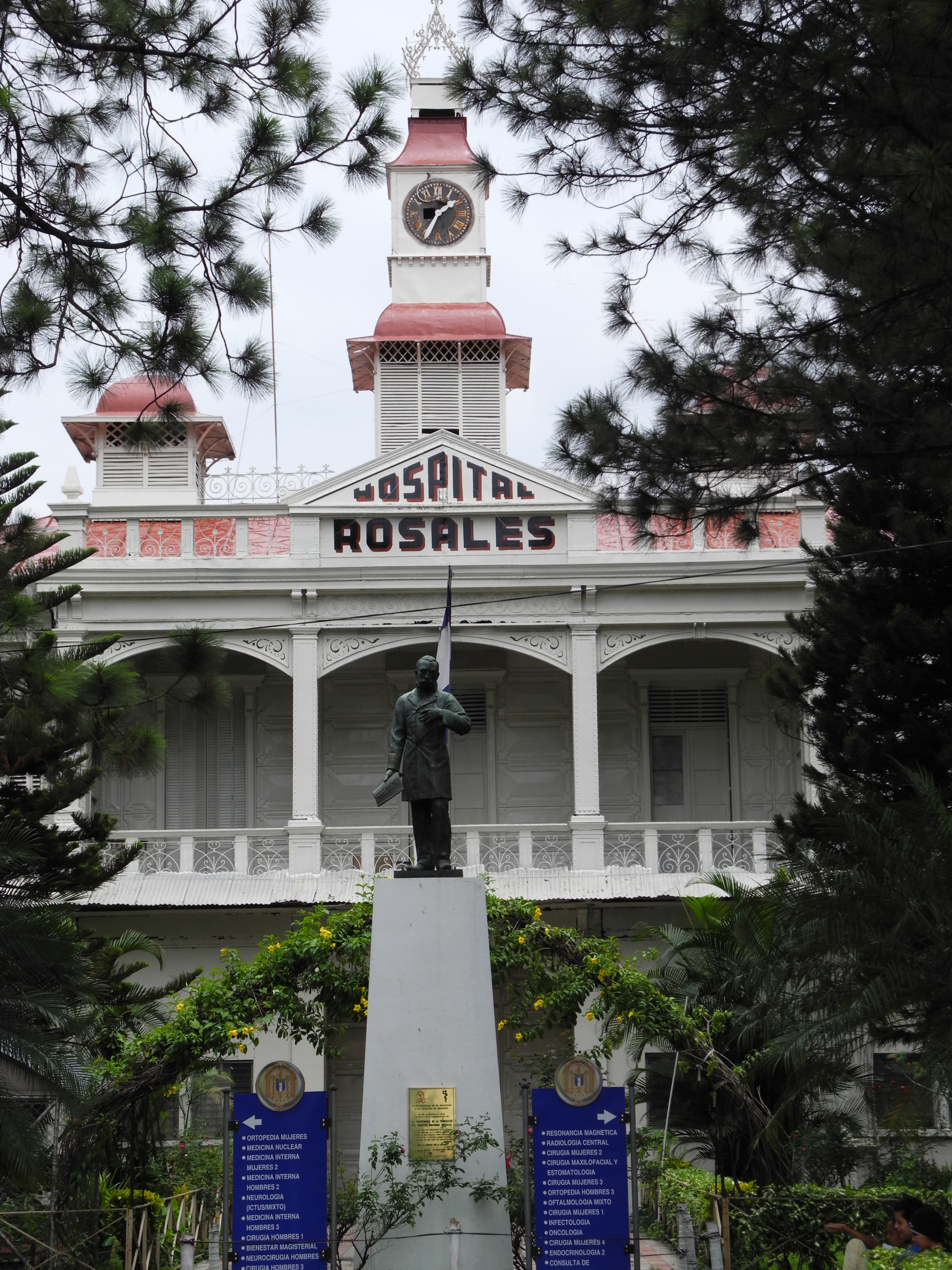
A statue of José Rosales Herrador in front of Hospital Rosales

Hospital Rosales was built on a hill then on the outskirts of San Salvador. The hospital consists of three 2-story buildings built in a neoclassical and neo-Gothic style. The main structure was erected using a then-popular and innovative building technique known as the Danly system, invented by the Belgian engineer Joseph Danly. The Danly system consisted in the erection of a wrought iron structure, strengthened with cast iron connecting pieces and clad with thin, galvanized and embossed prefabricated iron panels. The hospital has a statue of Rosales in its central rose garden. A metal bridge on the hospital grounds used to cross the now-paved Coco stream.

== See also ==
- Health in El Salvador
