= José Rosales (politician) =

President of El Salvador in 1885

Colonel José Rosales
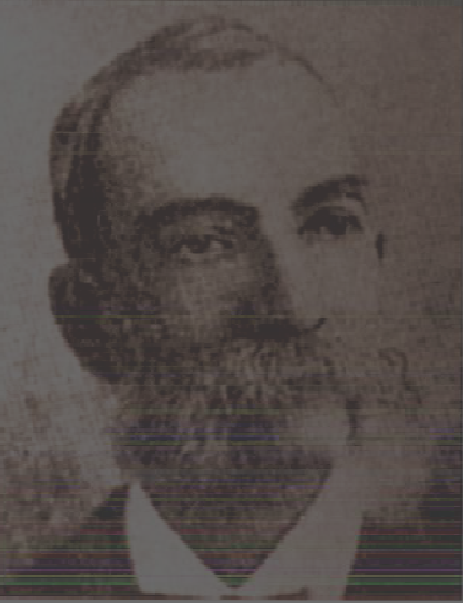

President of El Salvador
- In office 18 June 1885 – 22 June 1885; Acting President
- Preceded by: Fernando Figueroa (provisional)
- Succeeded by: Francisco Menéndez

Member of the Senate of El Salvador from San Salvador
- In office 1877, 1881, 1884 – 1885

29th & 42nd Mayor of San Salvador
- In office 1876
- Preceded by: Rafael Reyes
- Succeeded by: Manuel Bertis
- In office 1860
- Preceded by: Escolástico Andrino
- Succeeded by: Antonio Sifontes

Personal details
- Born: José Rosales Herrador; 19 March 1827 San Salvador, Federal Republic of Central America
- Died: 6 May 1891 (aged 64) San Salvador, El Salvador
- Spouse: Carmen Ungo
- Occupation: Politician, businessman

Military service
- Allegiance: El Salvador
- Branch/service: Salvadoran Army
- Rank: Colonel

José Rosales Herrador (19 March 1827 – 6 April 1891) was a Salvadoran politician, businessman, and military officer who served as President of El Salvador for five days in June 1885. He served as a senator in the Senate of El Salvador from the San Salvador Department on several occasions during the 1870s and 1880s.

== Early life ==
José Rosales Herrador was born on 19 March 1827 in San Salvador, Federal Republic of Central America. His parents were Colonel José Rosales y Sáenz and Josefa Herrador. In Rosales' youth, he attended a school run by Franciscans until it was shut down by Central American president Francisco Morazán, after which, Rosales was taught by private tutors from the Morales Villaseñor family. Rosales attended university in Guatemala City during the 1840s. Rosales owned various businesses and properties in San Salvador and Chalatenango. Rosales served in the Salvadoran Army and attainted the rank of colonel.

== Political career ==
Rosales served as mayor of San Salvador in 1860 and 1876. He was also a senator in the Senate of El Salvador from the San Salvador Department in 1877 and 1881 and later a deputy to the Constituent Congress in 1883. He was a senator in 1884 and 1885 and served as the Senate's vice president in 1885.

From 18 to 22 June, Rosales served as the acting president of El Salvador as the third presidential designate. He became president after a revolution by Divisional General Francisco Menéndez overthrew presidents Rafael Zaldívar and Divisional General Fernando Figueroa. Rosales signed the Treaty of San Andrés with Menéndez on 19 June, and on 22 June, Rosales formally handed Menéndez the presidency when he marched into San Salvador. He had one of the shortest presidencies in Salvadoran history.

After the revolution, Menéndez appointed Rosales as commander-in-chief of the Salvadoran Army in June. On 4 December, Menéndez appointed Rosales as councilor of state.

== Personal life ==
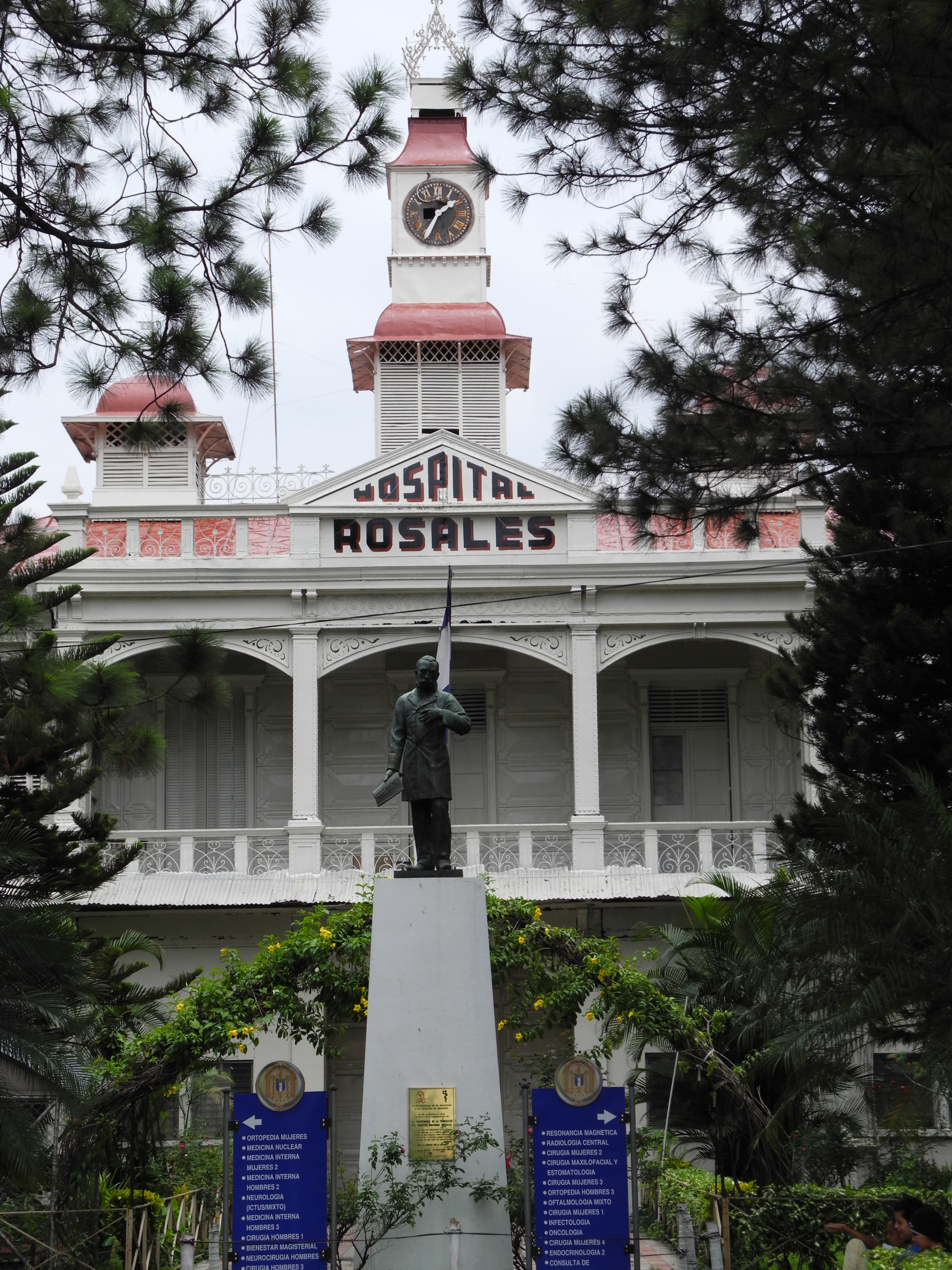
A statue of Rosales in front of Hospital Rosales

Rosales married Carmen Ungo. They had no children.

Rosales died in San Salvador, El Salvador on 6 April 1891. In Rosales' will, he allocated 500,000 pesos (Note: The 500,000 Salvadoran pesos allocated by Rosales to build a new hospital in 1891 was worth approximately 4 million United States dollars at the time. This is equivalent to $143,333,333 in 2025.) to build a new hospital in San Salvador. On 13 July 1902, the Salvadoran government inaugurated the new hospital and named it after him: Hospital Rosales.

== Notes ==
Political offices
Preceded by Escolástico Andrino	Mayor of San Salvador; 1860	Succeeded by Antonio Sifontes
Preceded by Rafael Reyes	Mayor of San Salvador; 1876	Succeeded by Manuel Bertis
Preceded by Fernando Figueroa (provisional)	President of El Salvador (acting); 1885	Succeeded by Francisco Menéndez
