= Salvadoran colón =

Currency of El Salvador from 1892 to 2001

colón salvadoreño (Spanish)

ISO 4217
- Code: SVC
- Subunit: 0.01

Unit
- Plural: colones
- Symbol: ₡

Denominations
- Subunit
- 1/100: centavo
- Banknotes: 1, 2, 5, 10, 25, 50, 100, 200 colones
- Coins: 1, 2, 3, 5, 10, 25, 50 centavos, 1 cólon

Demographics
- Date of introduction: 1892
- Replaced: Salvadoran peso
- Date of withdrawal: January 1, 2001 (de facto)
- Replaced by: United States dollar
- User(s): El Salvador

Issuance
- Central bank: Central Reserve Bank of El Salvador
- Website: www.bcr.gob.sv

Valuation
- Pegged with: United States dollar = 8.75 colones
- This infobox shows the latest status before this currency was rendered obsolete.

The colón is the currency of El Salvador, used de jure since 1892. In 2001 it was replaced de facto by the U.S. dollar during the presidency of Francisco Flores. The colón was subdivided into 100 centavos and its ISO 4217 code is SVC, which didn't deprecate as a historical code. The plural is "colones" in Spanish and the currency was named after Christopher Columbus, known as Cristóbal Colón in Spanish.

== Currency symbol ==
The symbol for the colón is a c with two slashes. The symbol "₡" has Unicode code point U+20A1, and the decimal representation is 8353. In HTML it can be entered as &#8353;. The colón sign is not to be confused with the cent sign (¢), which has a code point U+00A2 in Unicode (or 162 in decimal), or with the cedi sign ₵, which has a code point U+20B5 in Unicode (or 8373 in decimal). Nonetheless, the commonly available cent symbol '¢' is frequently used locally to designate the colón in price markings and advertisements.

== History ==
On October 1, 1892, the government of President Carlos Ezeta, decided that the Salvadoran peso should be called the 'Colon', in homage to Christopher Columbus. The colón replaced the peso at par in 1919. It was initially pegged to the U.S. dollar at a rate of 2 colones = 1 dollar. El Salvador left the gold standard in 1931 and its value floated.

On June 19, 1934, the Central Bank was created as the government body responsible for monetary policy and the sole body authorized to issue currency in the nation. On January 1, 2001, under the government of President Francisco Flores, the Law of Monetary Integration went into effect and allowed the free circulation of U.S. dollar in the country (see dollarization), with a fixed exchange rate of 8.75 colones. The colon has not officially ceased to be legal tender.

=== Post-colonial currency ===
In the mid-19th century, farms produced tin sheets (property sheets) with the farm's name and were used as payment to employees, the sheets only had value in the farm store that issued it, so it created a monopoly. Workers couldn't leave their jobs without losing everything. During the existence of the Central American Federation, the monetary system did not change with respect to the colonial system and continued using silver by weight as the main currency with circulation of macaques and property sheets. Once the federation dissolved, the Salvadoran government decreed the issuance of the first national currency, "Reales", silver coins engraved with an "R" and the "Escudos (Shields)" were gold coins with an "E" engraved.

In 1883, under the presidency of Dr. Rafael Zaldívar, the First Monetary Law was adopted using "peso" as a monetary unit, discarding the Spanish system of division into 8 reales. The new law served as a basis for the metric system, where the peso was equivalent to 10 reales. At the end of the 19th century, new paper money began to play an important role as an instrument of change as a unit of measure of the value of goods and as an element of savings. The job of issuing banknotes was decreed to private banks licensed by the government.

The first bank to issue banknotes was the Banco International (International Bank), founded in 1880, this bank was granted exclusive issuing rights, but then lost exclusivity to Banco Occidental and Banco Agricola Comercial. Under the presidency of Carloz Ezeta, the mint was inaugurated on August 28 of 1892. On October 1 of that year as a tribute to Christopher Columbus in the Discovery of America, the legislature reformed the monetary law and changed the name to "Colón". The exchange rate from US dollar at that time was 2 colones for a dollar.

In 1919 currency laws were amended stipulating that the coins with daily wear would be withdrawn from circulation and coins with cuts or punched out parts would not be accepted as legal tender. The amendment also prohibited the using of cards, vouchers or counterparts to replace the official currency. Furthermore, it gave the Ministry of Finance the power to control the circulation of the currency.

Despite the relative economic prosperity of the 1920s, the worldwide depression of 1929, the global drop in coffee prices and the government deregulation of the monetary system caused a national economic crisis. The main problem was the lack of a specialized institution dedicated to ensuring that currency retained its value by controlling banking activity. In response, the government of General Maximiliano Hernández Martínez hired an Englishman named Frederick Francis Joseph Powell to analyze and structure the Salvadoran banking body. In its final report, it was recommended that the banking system should be organized around a central bank to protect the currency and its value, and issue the currency and credit control.

Thus through the presidential initiative on June 19, 1934, the legislature approved the creation of the Central Bank of El Salvador, an institution whose objectives are set to control the volume of credit and demand of currency, and was also conferred the exclusive power to issue monetary kind.

== Coins ==
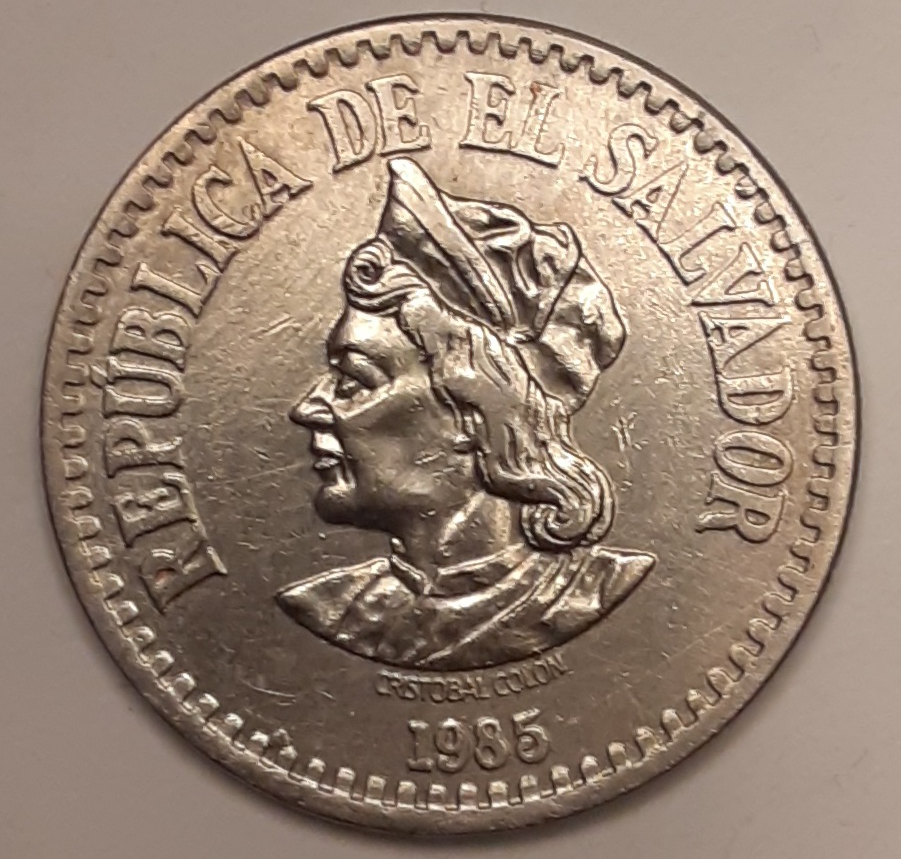
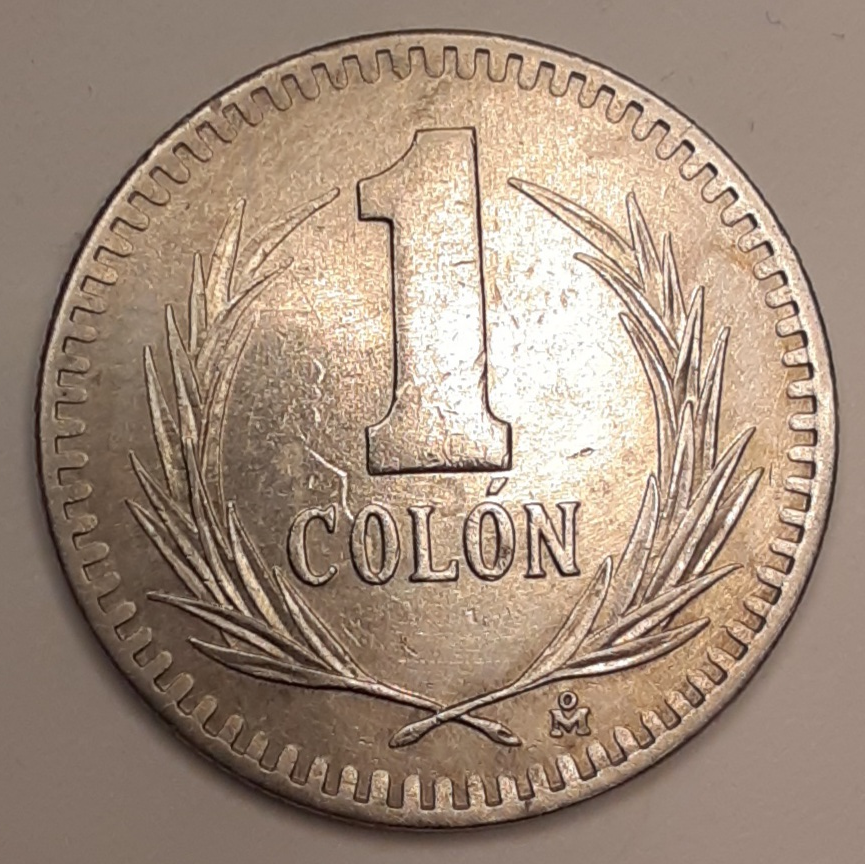
1 Salvadoran colón from El Salvador from 1985, which was minted in Mexico City by the Mexican Mint.

Because the colón replaced the peso at par, 1 and 5 centavos coins issued before 1919 continued to be issued without design change after the colón's introduction. In 1921, cupro-nickel 10 centavos were introduced, followed by silver 25 centavos in 1943. In 1953, silver 50 centavos were introduced alongside smaller silver 25 centavos. Both were replaced by nickel coins in 1970. In 1974, nickel-brass 2 and 3 centavos coins were introduced, followed by 1 colón coins in 1984. U.S. coins are now used.

== Banknotes ==
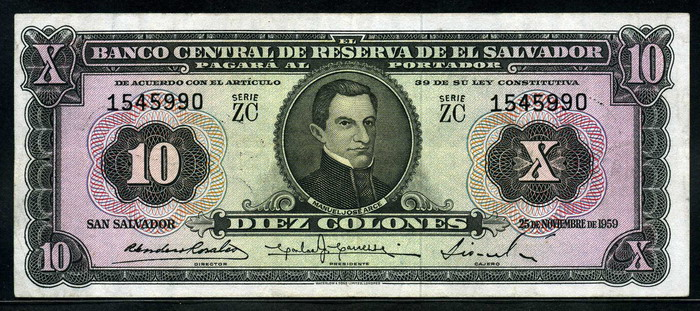
El Salvador 10 Colones banknote of 1959.

On August 31, 1934, the Central Reserve Bank of El Salvador put into circulation the first uniform family of banknotes, replacing banknotes issued by the Banco Agricola Comercial, the Banco Occidental, and the Banco Salvadoreño: the first banknote family consisted of six denominations: 1, 2, 5, 10, 25 and 100 colones. The Central Reserve Bank later authorised the first 50-colón banknotes on May 3, 1979, and the first 200-colón banknotes on April 18, 1997. The last two-colón banknotes were authorized on 24 June 1976, followed by the one-colón banknote on 3 June 1982.

Salvadoran banknotes were notable for having a validation overprint on the reverse: the practice of validating Salvadoran banknotes on a regular basis originated from the time when the government supervised the issue of commercial banknotes, and the date of the overprint on the back was later than the initial date of issue on the front. From 1961 to 2001, the Superintendency of the Central Reserve Bank (Spanish: Superintendencia de Bancos y otras Instituciones Financieras) was responsible for the validation of Salvadoran banknotes.

Validation overprints were discontinued with the latest series of colón banknotes in 1997, when the banknotes were only printed on the authorization of both the Central Reserve Bank and the Superintendency, but the differences between the dates on the front and reverse remained until the dollarization.

Colón banknotes
Image		Value	Main Color	Description	
Obverse	Reverse	Value	Main Color	Obverse	Reverse
		₡ 1 (US$0.11)	Red	Christopher Columbus	Presa 5 de Noviembre
		₡ 2 (US$0.23)	Magenta	Christopher Columbus	Colonial church in Panchimalco
		₡ 5 (US$0.57)	Green	Christopher Columbus	Palacio Nacional
		₡ 10 (US$1.14)	Blue	Christopher Columbus	Volcán de Izalco (Izalco volcano)
		₡ 25 (US$2.86)	Cyan	Christopher Columbus	Pirámide de San Andres
		₡ 50 (US$5.71)	Purple	Christopher Columbus	Lago de Coatepeque
		₡ 100 (US$11.43)	Olive Green	Christopher Columbus	Pirámide del Tazumal
		₡ 200 (US$22.86)	Brown	Christopher Columbus	Monumento al Divino Salvador del Mundo (Monument to the Divine Savior of the World)
For table standards, see the banknote specification table.

Salvadoran colón
Preceded by: Salvadoran peso Ratio: at par	Currency of El Salvador; 1919 – 31 December 2000; Note: currency still legal tender but no longer in circulation	Succeeded by: United States dollar Reason: dollarised by presidential decree Ratio: 1 U.S. dollar = 8.75 colones
