= Central Reserve Bank of El Salvador =

Monetary Authority of El Salvador

Central Reserve Bank of El Salvador Banco Central de Reserva de El Salvador

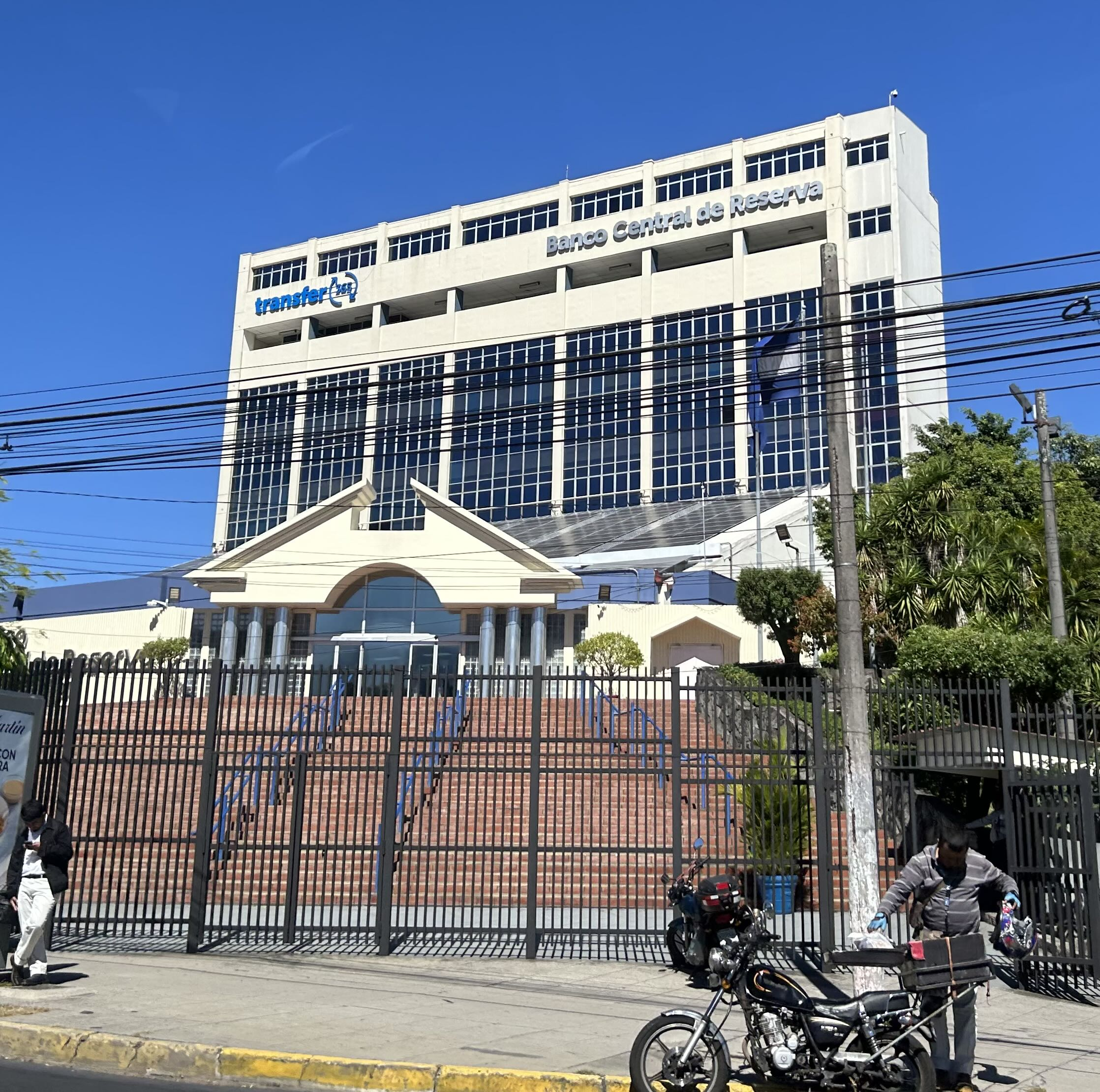
- Central bank of: El Salvador
- Headquarters: San Salvador
- Established: 19 June 1934; 91 years ago
- Ownership: 100% state ownership
- President: Douglas Rodríguez Fuentes
- Currency: none^{1}
- Reserves: ▲US$3.57 billion (2017)
- Website: www.bcr.gob.sv
- ^{1}Since 2001, with the dollarization of the Salvadoran economy, the Central Reserve Bank of El Salvador no longer has an independent monetary policy.

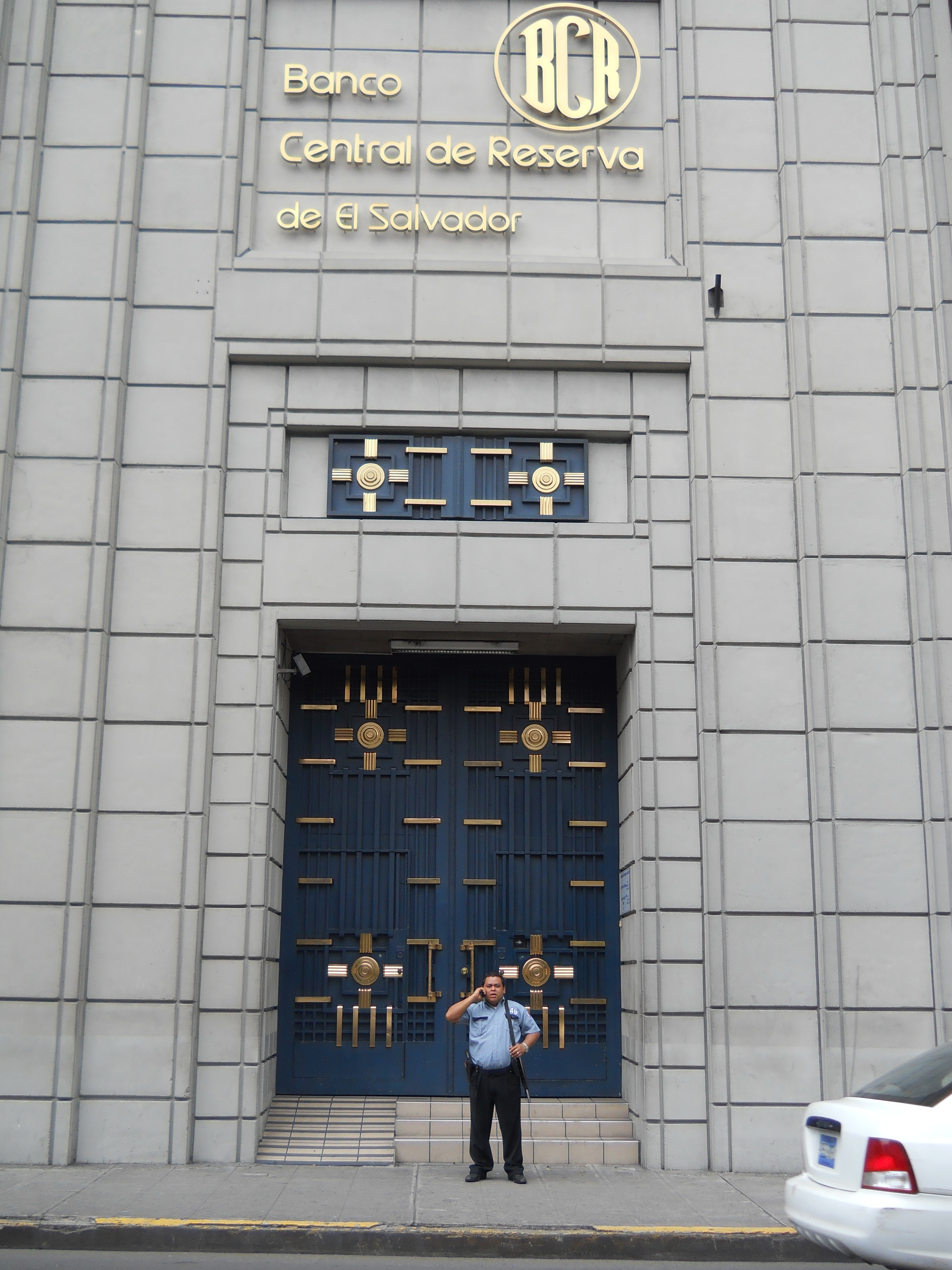
Façade of the Central Reserve Bank of El Salvador

The Central Reserve Bank of El Salvador (Spanish: Banco Central de Reserva de El Salvador) is the central bank of El Salvador, which controls the currency rate and regulates certain economic activities within El Salvador. The bank was originally privately owned, but was brought under state control through The Law on the Reorganization of Central Banking.

It was in charge of issuing Salvadoran colón coins and banknotes until the Monetary Integration Law of 2000 started the process of dollarizing the Salvadoran economy. In 2001, it stopped issuing new colón currency and no longer maintains a monetary policy of its own.

The bank is active in developing financial inclusion policy and is a member of the Alliance for Financial Inclusion. In 2013, the bank made a joint Maya Declaration Commitment with the Superintendencia del Sistema Financiero of El Salvador to carry out a series of concrete and measurable actions.

== Presidents ==
- Luis Alfaro Durán, 1934–1954
- Carlos J. Canessa, 1954–1961
- Manuel López Harrison, 1961
- Francisco Aquino, 1961–1966
- Guillermo Hidalgo Qüehl, 1966–1967
- Abelardo Torres, 1967
- Alfonso Moisés Beatriz, 1967–1971
- Edgardo Suárez Contreras, 1971–1975
- Guillermo Hidalgo Qüehl, 1975–1977
- Víctor Hugo Hurtarte, 1978–1979
- Pedro Abelardo Delgado, 1980–1981
- Alberto Benítez Bonilla, 1981–1987
- Maurice Choussy Rusconi, 1987–1988
- Mauricio Antonio Gallardo, 1988–1989
- Roberto Orellana Milla, 1989–1998
- Gino Rolando Bettaglio, 1998–1999
- Rafael Barraza, 1999–2002
- Luz María Serpas de Portillo, 2002–2009
- Carlos Gerardo Acevedo, 2009–2013
- Marta Evelyn de Rivera, 2013–2014
- Oscar Cabrera Melgar, 2014–2019
- Carlos Federico Paredes, 2019
- Nicolás Alfredo Martínez, 2019–2020
- Douglas Rodríguez Fuentes, 2020–

== See also ==
- Economy of El Salvador
- Ministry of Finance (El Salvador)
- List of central banks
