= Salvadoran real =

Currency of El Salvador from 1828 to 1877

The real was the currency of El Salvador, issued from 1828 until 1877 and used until 1889.

== History ==
The Spanish colonial and Central American Republic reales both circulated in El Salvador. Between 1828 and 1835, coins were issued specifically for El Salvador. From 1830, various foreign coins were counterstamped for use in El Salvador. In 1877, banknotes denominated in pesos were introduced, with 8 reales = 1 peso. The real ceased to be used in 1889, when El Salvador decimalized.

== Coins ==
Silver coins were issued between 1828 and 1835 in denominations of ½, 1, 2 and 4 reales. All bore a design of a mountain on one face, with the inscription "Moneda Provisional" (Provisional Money). In addition, foreign coins were countermarked. Most were reales denominations, including ½, 1, 2, 4 and 8 reales, but some British sixpences and shillings were also countermarked.
