= Casa de Fierro =

Cultural heritage site in Peru

Coordinates: 3°44′59.49″S 73°14′38.41″W

The Iron House
- La Casa de Fierro (in Spanish)
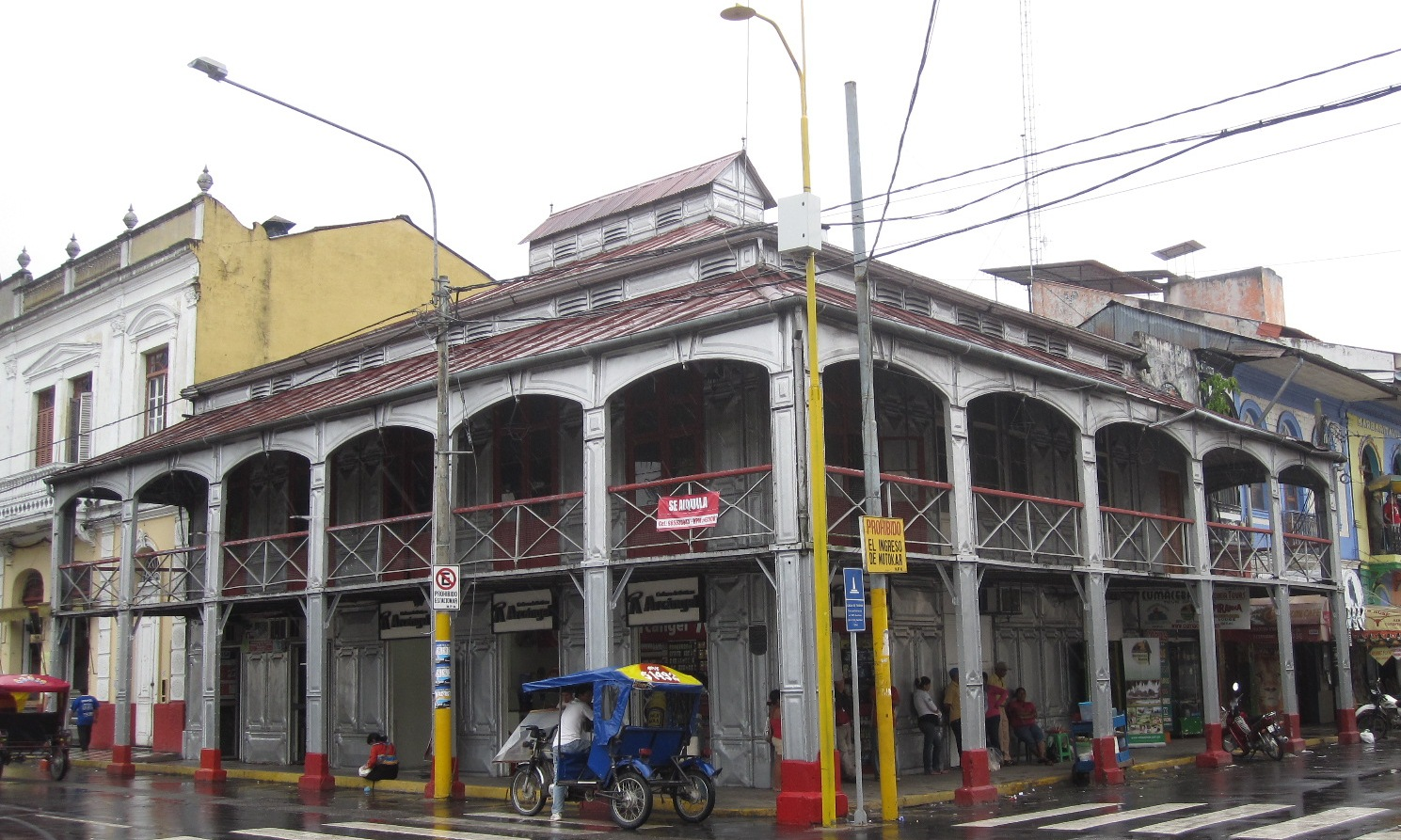
- The "Casa de Fierro" in Iquitos, Peru
- Interactive map of the The Iron House area
- Alternative names: La Maison de Fer (in French)

General information
- Type: House
- Location: Iquitos, Peru, between Próspero and Putumayo streets
- Current tenants: "The Café of the Amazon" (restaurant; first and second floors)
- Construction started: 1887 (creation in Belgium)
- Completed: 1889 (prefabrication state)
- Inaugurated: 1890 (built in Iquitos)
- Owner: Judith Acosta Vda. De Fortes

Technical details
- Structural system: Precompression

Design and construction
- Architect: Joseph Danly
- Architecture firm: Forges d'Aiseau
- Awards: Cultural Heritage of Peru

La Casa de Fierro (archaism, English: the Iron House, French: La Maison de Fer), located in the city of Iquitos in the jungle of Peru, in front of the major square between Próspero and Putumayo streets, is a large iron residence built during the rubber boom at the end of the nineteenth century. The house was bought by the Bolivian explorer and entrepreneur Antonio Vaca Diez.

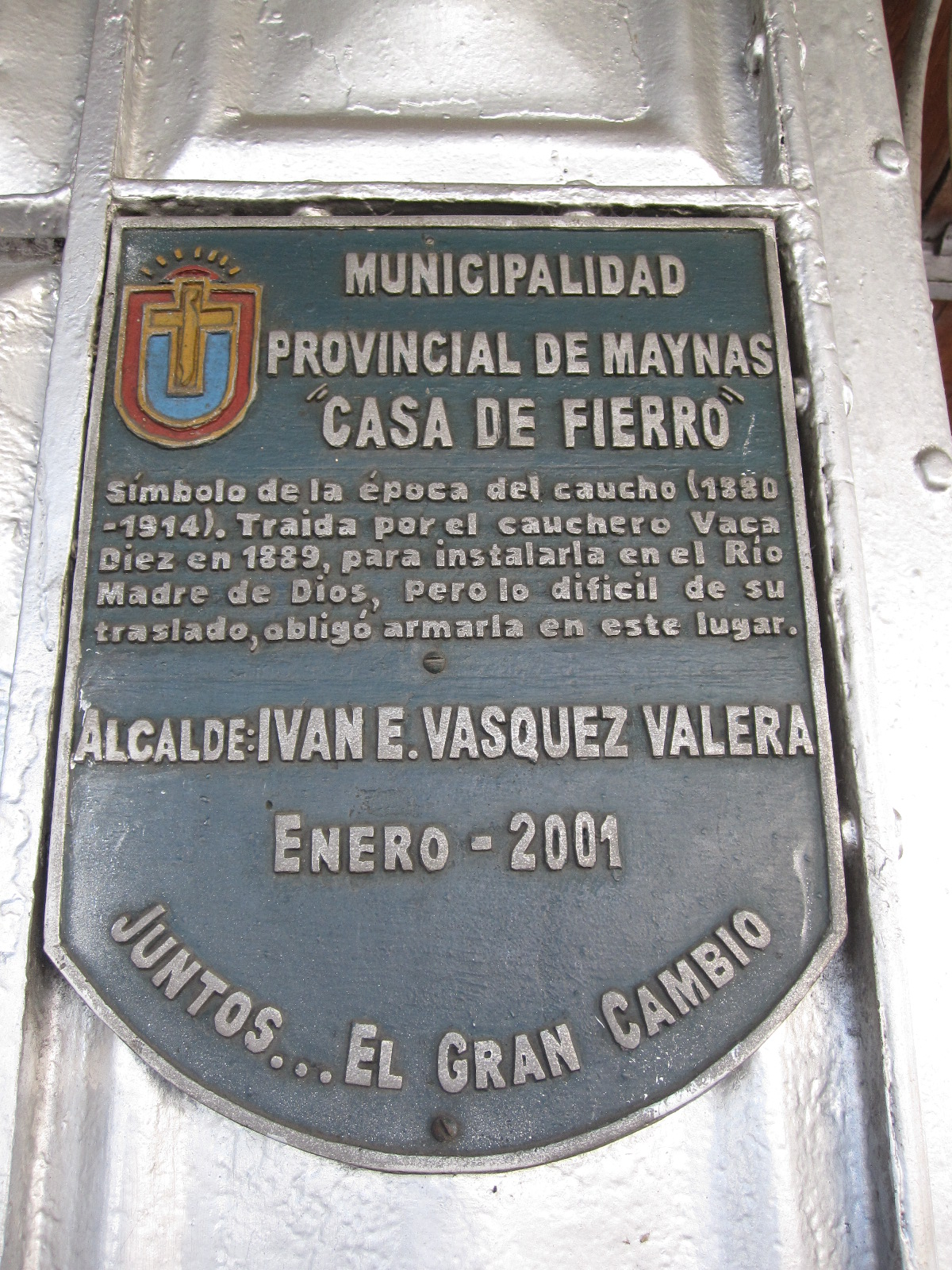
Commemorative plaque mounted on the exterior wall

La Casa de Fierro is one of the finest as well as best-preserved samples of civil architecture in Peru. The walls, ceiling, and balcony are plastered in rectangular sheets of iron. It is said to be the first prefabricated house in the Americas. Although popularly said to have been designed by the French architect Gustave Eiffel, there is no evidence at all that this is true; the building does not reflect his architectural style. Since 2011 well substantiated claims prove it was built in the Belgian workshops of Les Forges d'Aiseau (Joseph Danly process). Rubber baron Anselmo del Aguila bought it at the International Exposition of Paris in 1889. Once dismantled, it was brought in pieces to Iquitos (the metal sheets were carried by hundreds of men through the jungle), and assembled there in 1890.

Since 1985, it is being administered by the Club Social de Iquitos; which has contributed in its restoration. Today the house is a commercial structure. It contains a restaurant, La Casa de Fierro Restaurante, on its second floor with stores on the ground level.

A fully different story of the origin of the house is told in Mario Vargas Llosa's Captain Pantoja and the Special Service (Pantaleón y las visitadoras), a comic novel.

== See also ==
- Fitzcarraldo
