= Aiseau =

Section of Aiseau-Presles, Wallonia, Belgium

Coordinates: 50°25′N 04°35′E

Aiseau (French pronunciation: [ɛzo]; Walloon: Åjhô) is a village of Wallonia and a district of the municipality of Aiseau-Presles, located in the province of Hainaut, Belgium.

It was a separate municipality before the Merger of Commons in 1977.

It borders the Biesme, near its mouth on the Sambre.

- Postal area: 6250 (old zone: 6268)
- Province: Hainaut
- District: Charleroi
- Hamlets of Aiseau: Menonri (wa: In Mnonri); Oignies (wa: Ougniye), with its béguinage.

== Prehistory and history ==
Traces of human presence date back to prehistoric times. In caves in Parc du Comte de Presles various bones were discovered of Neanderthal man dating back to the Paleolithic Era.

Later, during the Roman Empire, a Gallo-Roman villa was built at the southern end of the village (along Presles Road). A cistern was present. A cemetery was a few hundred meters further north, at the foot of Bois de Broue, along the rue d'Aiseau.

The village itself appeared in the tenth century, at a place called the "Hayettes." A farm was present in 952.

A mansion was built in the center of village. It was enlarged over centuries to be remodeled for the last time in 1721. It was destroyed in 1794 by French revolutionaries. In 1860, the village school took its place. Only part remaining today is the front porch with the arms of the last family that ruled the village, the "Gavre" porch. This building was then used as stables of the castle and by house servants. A few outer walls of the castle can also be seen along the rue du Curé.

Not far away, the "Baudecart Farm" was built as the farm of the Lord of the village. This farm still exists, although changed.

== Culture and heritage ==
=== Oignies Priory ===
Hugo d'Oignies, the great Mosan goldsmith, worked at Priory Oignies. His work was conserved, which is exceptional. It was hidden in Falisolle during the French Revolution in 1818 and entrusted to the Sisters of Notre Dame in Namur. Today we can admire the largest part of the treasure in the museum the Sisters of Notre-Dame in Namur, the rest is kept in the parishes of Aiseau, Falisolle, Septic, Nivelles and Walcourt as well as Royal Museums of art and History in Brussels and the diocesan Museum of Namur.

=== Industrial development ===
Historically, Aiseau was a village dedicated to agriculture, logging, but also to the industry.

As evidence of development, several centuries of iron ore have been discovered. This activity leads to the creation and perpetuation of Forges d'Aiseau, factories located south of the village, along the Biesme. These products were exported around the world, including Mexico. But their location, far from the Sambre and railways, made it impossible to work there. These factories closed in the early twentieth century. Nowadays, the Somville Workshops produce light metals.

Wagons came from Aiseau coal mines. For centuries, coal was mined from various locations on the hillside. Two wells exist, one in Oignies (St. Henry's Well) and the other in Ménonry (the colliery Champfroment). A ventilation shaft was located not far from the place called " l'Etoile" (Star) 50 m behind Somville Workshops. Concrete wells are still visible today.

The production of glass was also occurred in Aiseau through "Glaceries Sainte-Marie d'Oignies". This huge farm was located along the present street Oignies, the along the Sambre. Its fame was international, the windows of the Empire State Building in New York were especially produced there. King Leopold I visited the buildings. While the lower village was laid out accordingly, Abbey Oignies partly destroyed houses built for workers, and the Biesme diverted from its original course.

The factory closed in 1930 due to the global crisis. Today, there are only ruins, found in a park.

In addition to industries Aiseau also owned a chemical plant (opposite the Abbey), a cooperage (near the station), water mills, and others.

=== World War I ===
Aiseau, along with whole region, suffered much from the conflict which has always marked the region. The Battle of Charleroi, from 21 to 23 August 1914, was one of the most painful episodes.

On 21 August, the Germans descended on the Sambre, attacked Roselies at Northwest Aiseau. The French, driven from the village, retreated between Menonry, Aiseau-Centre and Presles. During the night of August 21 to 22, against the French counter-attacked and suffered very heavy losses at Roselies. The pantalons rouges fell back again Aiseau and left the village, going in the direction of Presles. At North East Aiseau, on the border with Tamines where other heavy fighting occurred, the Germans broke through the French lines and up the valley of the Sambre towards Le Roux by the Oignies neighborhood. At the height of the "Ferme de la Belle-Motte", during the fighting, there was a rare violence in the woods and surrounding fields. The farm burned and the French had to withdraw on Le Roux and then to Devant-les-Bois.

As in the neighboring villages, in addition to the damage caused by the fighting, German soldiers set fire to dozens of home and shot many villagers. After the war, at a place called Belle-Motte, a Franco-German cemetery was built, called logically "Cemetery Belle-Motte." The soldiers buried around the village and the region, were gathered in the upper part of the village. A few years later, German soldiers were transported to Vladslo Cemetery, near Ypres. 4,057 French soldiers are buried in the cemetery of Belle-Motte. 1182 buried in tombs and 2875 in two ossuaries.

== Natural environment ==
Aiseau offers an impressive variety of natural habitats. In the North, the Sambre and alluvial grasslands allows us to remember that before the passage of the river, it was composed of unbroken meanders. Marshes occupied these places. Today, grasslands remain moist, with much biodiversity. A bank of the Moignelée, a former meander, is also protected.

The slag heap of Champfroment hosts various species of plants that are found further south in Europe.

The Biesme Valley also offers a remarkable diversity of natural habitats and species. In addition to the wealth of fish from the river, it is connected to Oignies ponds, dug by the monks of the Priory. These ponds are a nature reserve.

Still further south, the Biesme digs the valley more deeply. It then enters the "Marlagne" an area along the south of the Sambre several tens of kilometers. At the border of Presles, the river flows through a limestone area which makes the steep valley cliffs bordering the creek. The caves of the valley host bats.

The maximum height difference between Biesme and the top of the valley is about 100 m.

The Condroz is found Southeast of the village.

== Demographics ==
Historical population

Year	Pop.	±%
1806	1,806	—
1816	1,816	+0.6%
1830	1,830	+0.8%
1846	1,846	+0.9%
1856	1,856	+0.5%

Year	Pop.	±%
1866	1,866	+0.5%
1876	1,876	+0.5%
1880	1,880	+0.2%
1890	1,890	+0.5%
1900	1,900	+0.5%

Year	Pop.	±%
1910	1,910	+0.5%
1920	1,920	+0.5%
1930	1,930	+0.5%
1947	1,947	+0.9%
1961	1,961	+0.7%

Year	Pop.	±%
1970	1,970	+0.5%
1976	1,976	+0.3%
