= Salvadoran peso =

Former currency of El Salvador

peso salvadoreño (Spanish)

Denominations
- Subunit
- 1/8: real until 1889
- 1/100: centavo
- Banknotes: 1, 2, 5, 10, 25, 50, 100, 500 pesos
- Coins: 1, 3, 5, 10, 25, 50 centavos, 1 peso

Demographics
- User(s): El Salvador
- This infobox shows the latest status before this currency was rendered obsolete.

The peso was the currency of El Salvador between 1877 and 1919.

== History ==
The peso replaced the Salvadoran and Central American Republic reales, at a rate of 8 reales = 1 peso. Banknotes were issued from 1877. The Salvadoran real continued to be used until 1889. In 1889, El Salvador decimalized, with the peso subdivided into 100 centavos, and began to issue coins. The peso was initially pegged to the French franc, at a rate of 1 peso = 5 francs. The peso was replaced in 1919 by the colón, at par.

== Coins ==
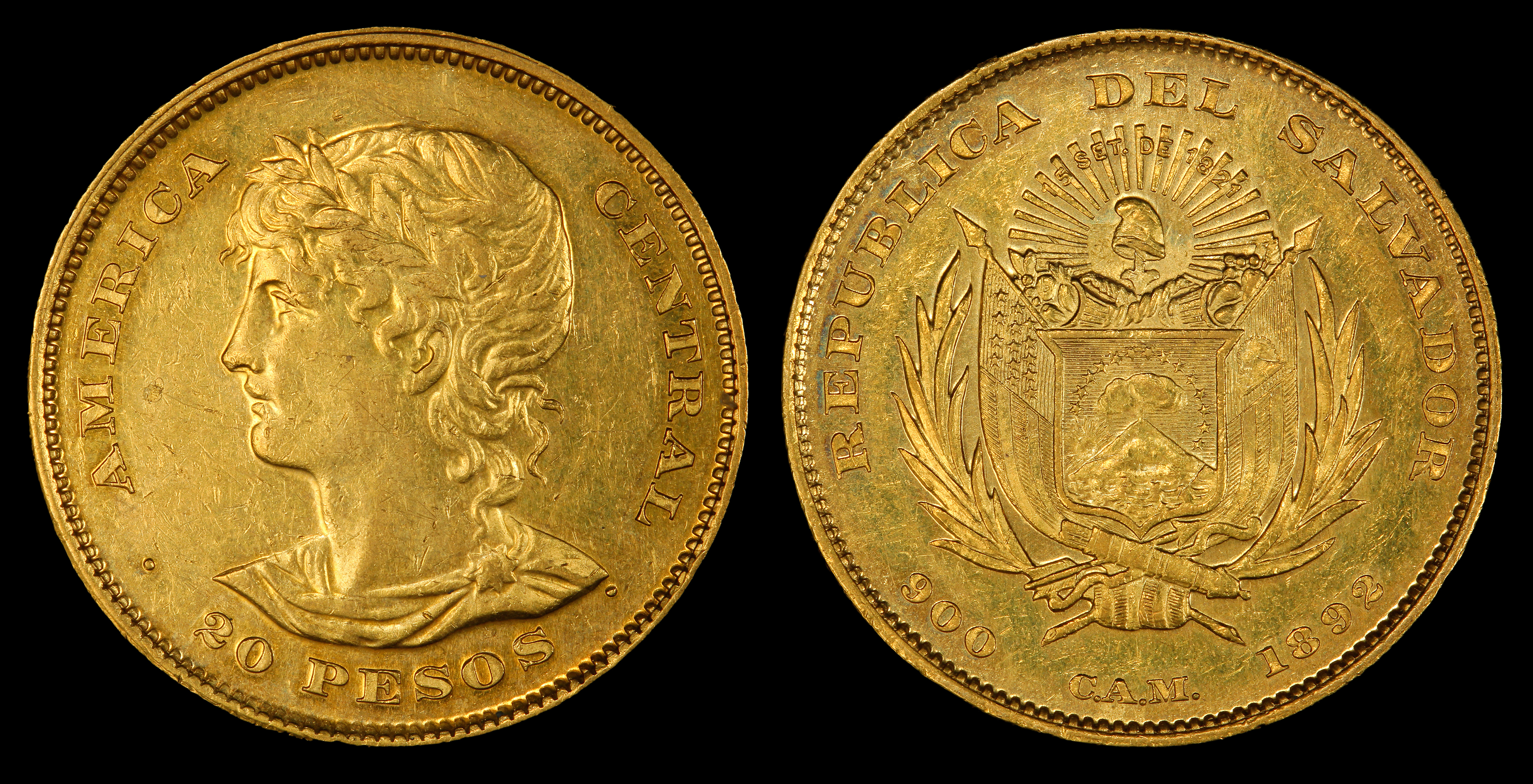
El Salvador 1892 20 Pesos, first year of issue for gold coins

The first decimal Salvadoran coins were issued in 1889. These were copper-nickel 1 and 3 centavos. On August 28, 1892, the Salvadoran mint was established and production of silver and gold coins denominated in centavos and pesos began. In addition to copper 1 centavo coins, there were silver 5, 10, 20 centavos and 1 peso, and gold 2 1/2, 5, 10 and 20 pesos, although the gold coins were only issued in very small numbers (597, 558, 321, and 300 respectively). In 1909, bronze 1/4 real coins were issued in response to the continued use of the real currency system in parts of the country. Coins for 25 centavos were introduced in 1911. Production of silver coins was suspended in 1914.

== Banknotes ==
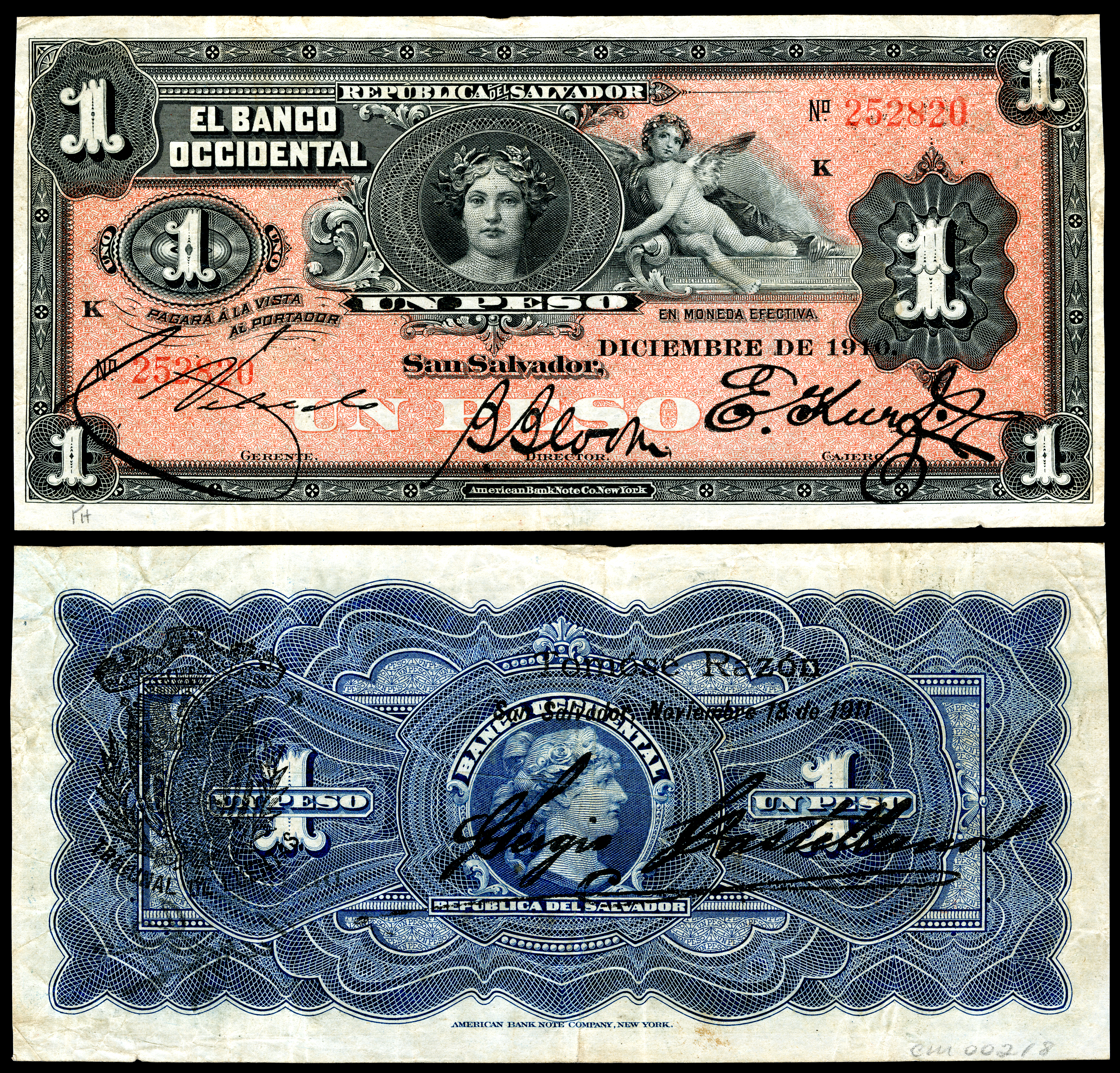
Banco Occidental (private bank), 1 Peso (1910)

The government issued banknotes (engraved and printed by the National Bank Note Company of New York) denominated in pesos in 1877, in denominations of 1, 2, 5, 10, 25, 50, 100 and 500 pesos. Following this, private banks issued notes until after the peso was replaced by the colón. These included the Banco Agricola Comercial, the Banco de Ahuachapam, the Banco de Centro America y Londres, the Banco Industrial del Salvador, the Banco Internacional del Salvador, the Banco Nacional del Salvador, the Banco Occidental and the Banco Salvadoreño. Notes were issued in denominations of 1, 2, 5, 10, 25, 50, 100 and 500 pesos.
