= Meléndez–Quiñónez dynasty =

Political dynasty in El Salvador

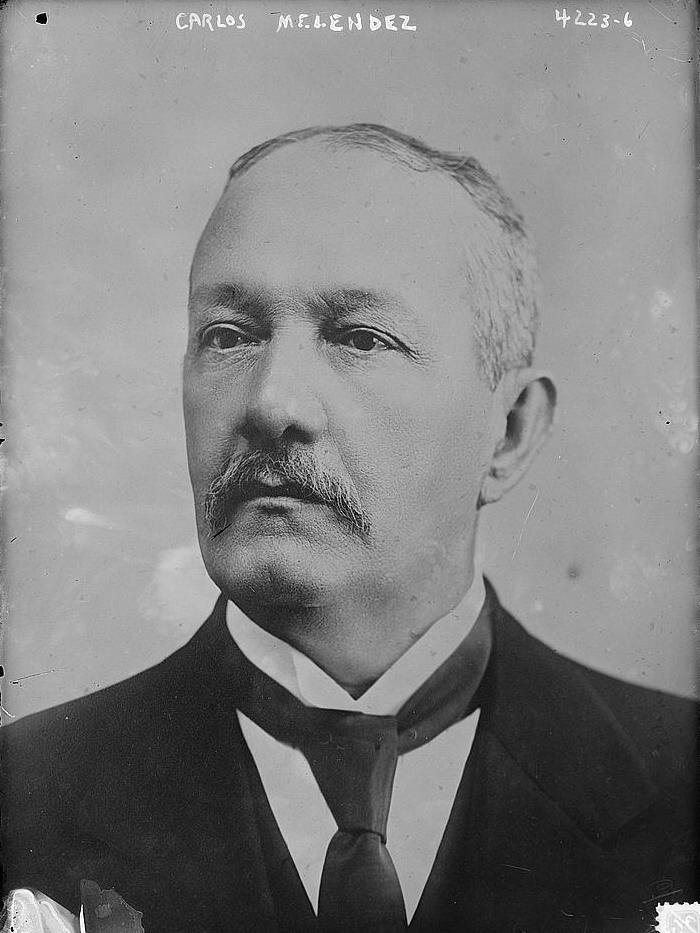
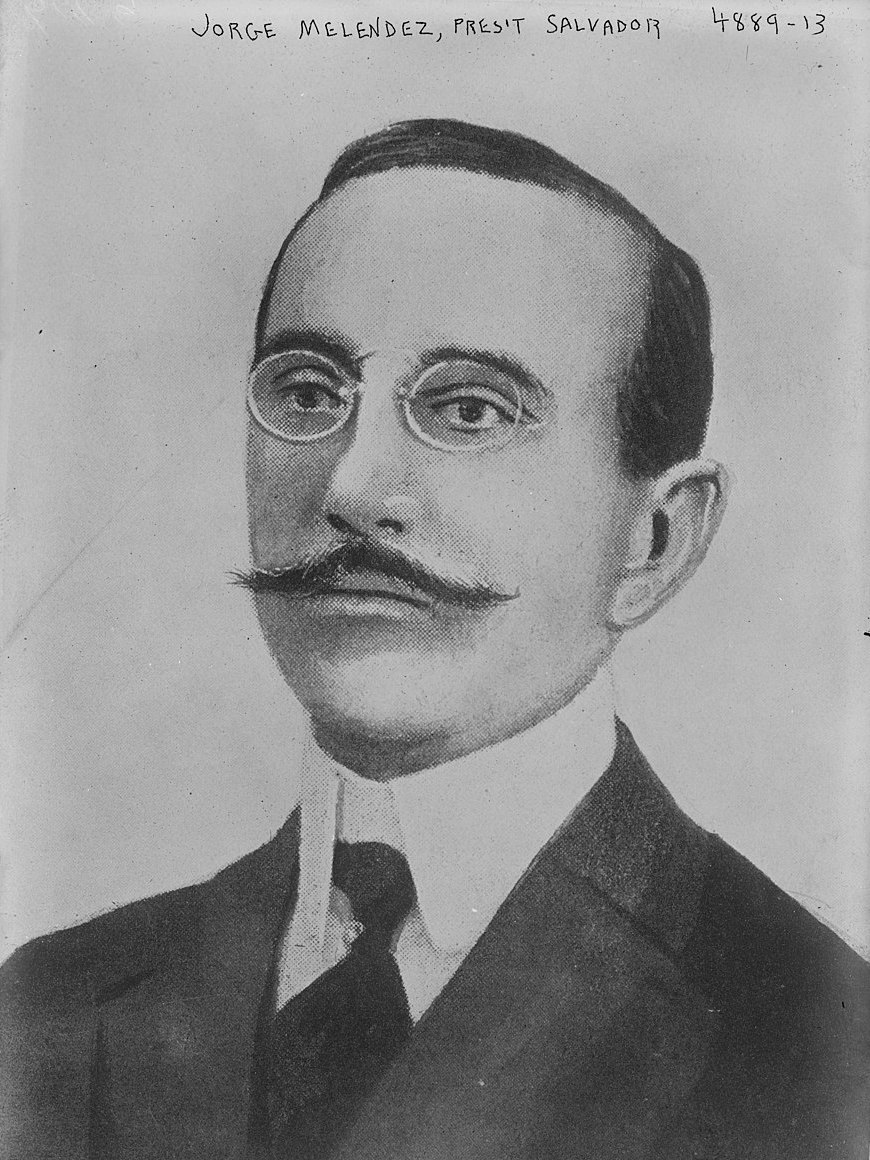
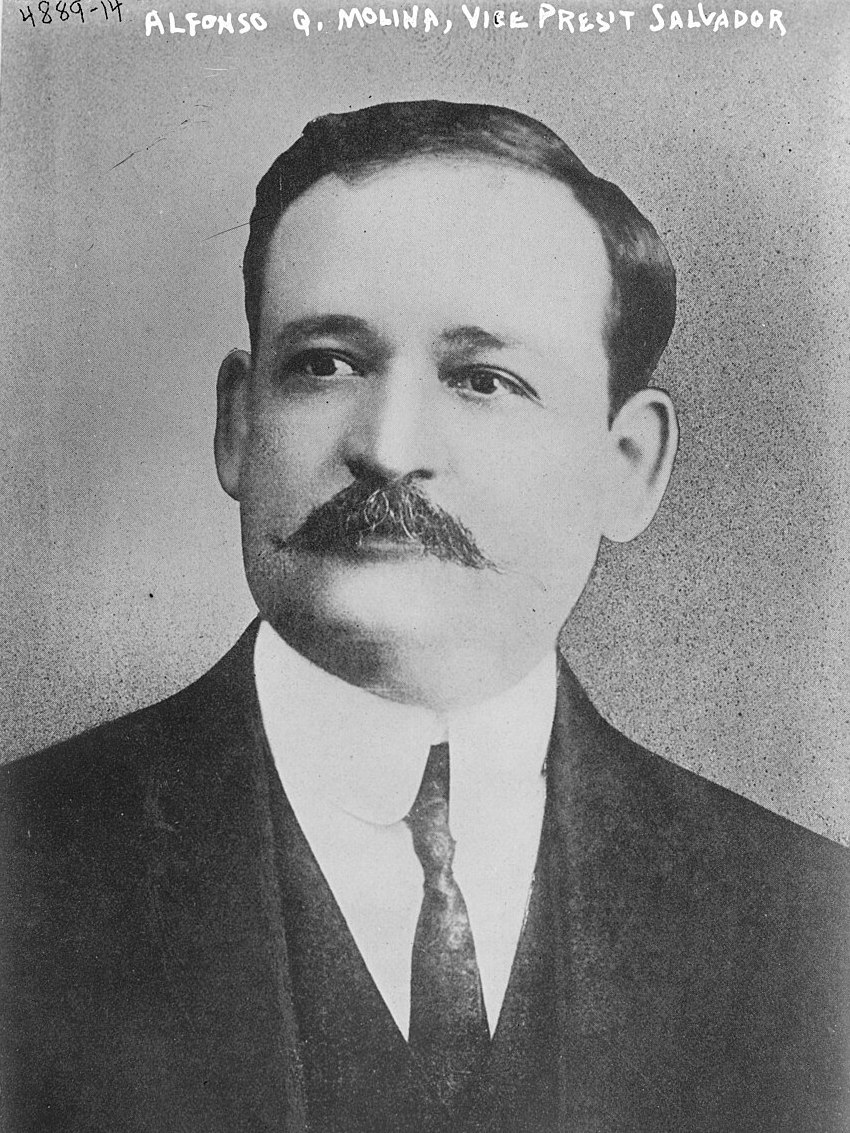
(From left to right) Carlos Meléndez, Jorge Meléndez, and Alfonso Quiñónez Molina, the three presidents of El Salvador during the Meléndez–Quiñónez dynasty

The Meléndez–Quiñónez dynasty (Spanish: dinastía Meléndez-Quiñónez) was a period in El Salvador's history from 1913 to 1927 when the Salvadoran government was controlled by the Meléndez–Quiñónez political family. During this period, three of the family's members—brothers Carlos Meléndez and Jorge Meléndez and their brother-in-law Alfonso Quiñónez Molina—rotated control of the presidency between themselves.

The dynasty began in 1913 when Carlos became president after Manuel Enrique Araujo's assassination. Carlos resigned in 1914 to run in the 1915 presidential election and was briefly succeeded by Quiñónez. Carlos won the election and served until his resignation in 1918. Quiñónez again succeeded him, and Carlos' younger brother Jorge won the 1919 election. He served until 1923 when he was succeeded by Quiñónez. Quiñónez served until 1927 when he was succeeded by Pío Romero Bosque, his minister of war and a personal friend. Quiñónez intended to continue ruling El Salvador through Romero as a puppet ruler, but Romero politically broke from the Meléndez–Quiñónez dynasty. Jorge and Quiñónez attempted to overthrow Romero, but their December 1927 coup attempt failed, ending the dynasty's influence in El Salvador.

The Meléndez–Quiñónez dynasty ruled El Salvador in an authoritarian manner. It utilized fraudulent elections and political repression by the Red League paramilitary to hold onto power. Jorge and Quiñónez established the National Democratic Party (PDN) in 1918 to ensure that its allies got elected to political offices. In 1922, the Red League killed a dozen people who supported a rival in the 1923 presidential election during the Christmas Day Massacre. The dynasty benefitted economically from high coffee prices and foreign investments; meanwhile, Salvadoran workers protested and demanded more rights and improved working conditions.

== Establishment ==
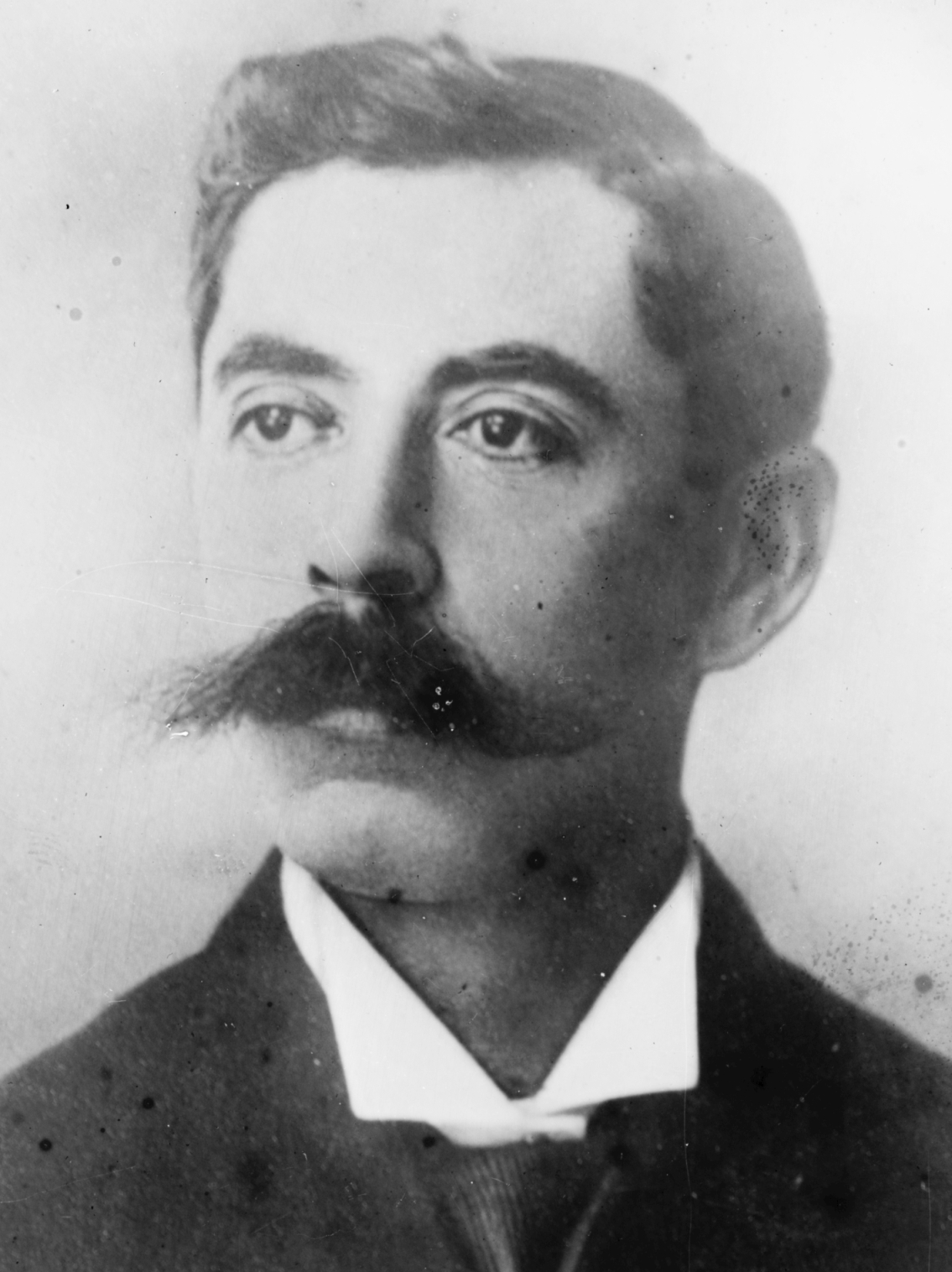
Manuel Enrique Araujo, whose assassination led to the rise of the Meléndez–Quiñónez dynasty

On 9 February 1913, Salvadoran president Manuel Enrique Araujo died from wounds sustained in an assassination attempt five days prior. As Vice President Onofre Durán Santillana resigned before Manuel Enrique Araujo's death, Carlos Meléndez, the president of the Legislative Assembly of El Salvador and the first presidential designate, succeeded Manuel Enrique Araujo as the provisional president. Shortly after assuming office, Carlos had Manuel Enrique Araujo's assassins executed by firing squad.

Carlos had been active in Salvadoran politics since the 1894 Revolution of the 44 that brought General Rafael Antonio Gutiérrez to power. Carlos ran for vice president in the 1895 election but lost to Prudencio Alfaro by 19,214 votes. Carlos ran for vice president again in the 1903 election, and for president in 1903 and 1907, but was unsuccessful each time. Carlos intended to be elected to the presidency in the 1915 presidential election and established the Club Melendista (a pseudo-political party) to help him win the election. The club ensured that only his allies would be elected to local offices so that they could select election officials who would guarantee Carlos' victory.

On 29 August 1914, Carlos resigned from the presidency and handed it to his brother-in-law Alfonso Quiñónez Molina, the country's first presidential designate. Carlos did this because he would have been constitutionally ineligible to run for president in the 1915 presidential election if he did not resign early. The constitution prohibited anyone who had held the office of President in the six months prior to an election from participating in it, as a way to prevent consecutive re-election. Carlos ultimately won the 1915 election and was inaugurated as President on 1 March 1915. Quiñónez became his vice president.

== Rule over El Salvador ==
=== Centralization of power ===
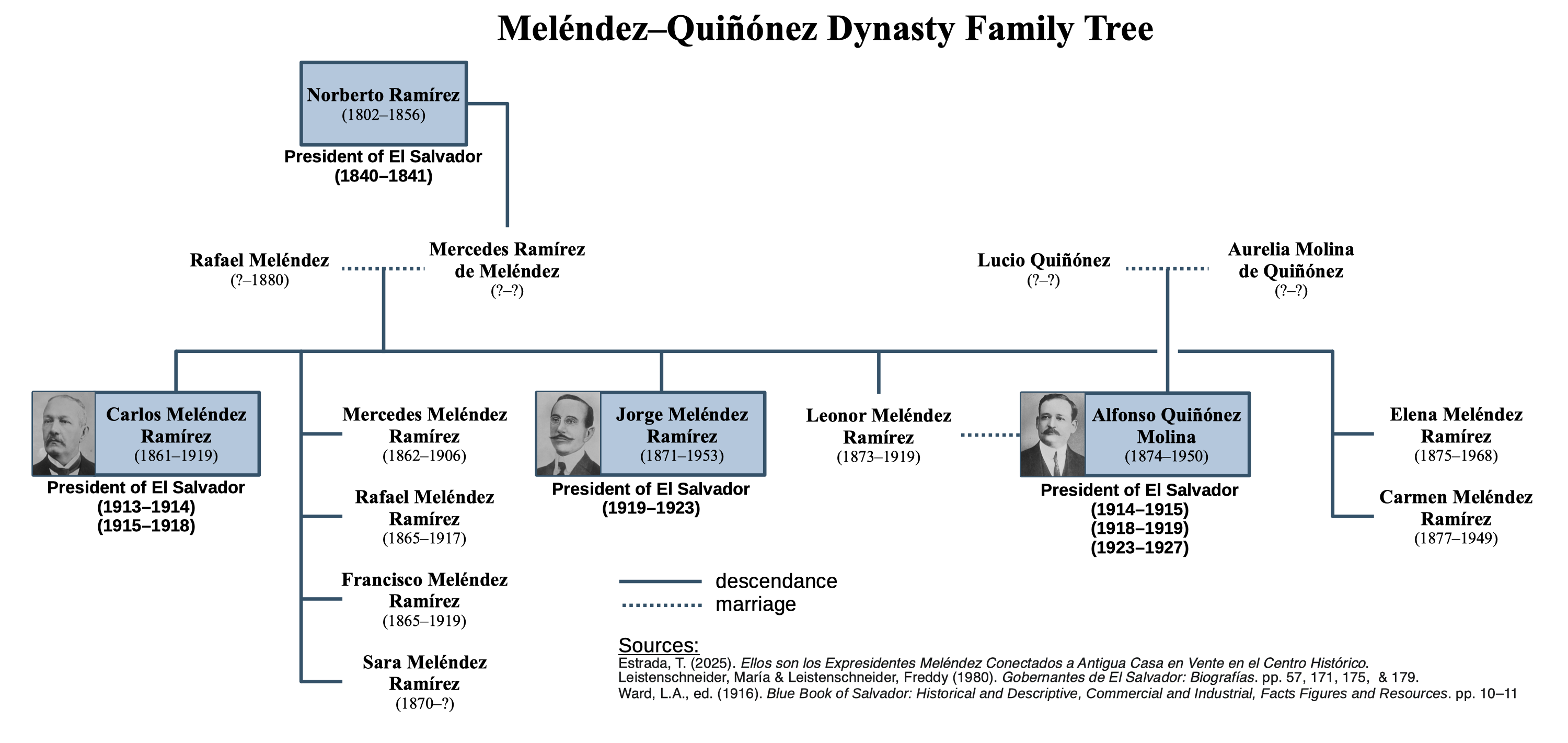
Family connections of the Meléndez–Quiñónez dynasty

Once the Meléndez–Quiñónez dynasty was in power, it sought to ensure that it would remain in power through the use of fraudulent and rigged elections that would favor the dynasty. Political scientist Michael Krennerich wrote that El Salvador's elections during the Meléndez–Quiñónez dynasty "had little political significance" outside of a small oligarchy that was allowed to participate. Furthermore, those that were allowed to participate in elections all had political positions similar to those of the dynasty. According to historians Luis Guillermo Bernal Ramírez and Ana Elia Quijano de Batres, "the entire country" ("todo el país") knew that elections were fraudulent. One contemporary election official remarked that "presidential continuance depend[ed] often enough on electoral fraud".

"Why would capitalists risk their money by investing it in a transport business, for example, when in the morning, General X, jefe of a revolutionary band, expropriates it? Why would they put their money into useful enterprises when just as quickly it is extracted by an exaggerated tribute decreed by some irresponsible government born in the clamor of gunfire? [...] It is necessary that politics be guided along a path that little by little dispenses with the gangrene of personalism, the primordial cause of our instability."

— Jorge Meléndez in Economic Orientations of President Meléndez, 14 September 1917

In mid-1918, Jorge Meléndez (Carlos' younger brother) and Quiñónez established the National Democratic Party (PND) to consolidate their political networks and allegiances. All political activity outside the party was soon outlawed. During Carlos' presidency, the Meléndez brothers portrayed their government and a break from the country's past of factionalized violence and revolutions. In a pamphlet titled Economic Orientations of President Meléndez, Jorge praised his brother's presidency as having defeated caudillismo in the name of "civilized government". They presented this liberal and democratic portrayal of the government to justify their centralization of power into their government, the Club Melendista, and the PND. The PND had a paramilitary wing known as the Red League ("Liga Roja") that intimidated opponents with violence. Many of the Red League's members were clients of the dynasty's allies and indigenous Salvadorans that sought to use the paramilitary's training for their own political advantage.

In the lead up to the 1919 presidential election, Carlos did not designate a presidential successor, so Quiñónez and Tomás García Palomo (Carlos' minister of government and finance) ran against each other. During the December 1918 municipal elections, Quiñónez and Palomo's supporters clashed with each other at polling stations, killing around 100 people and wounding 200 more. The election resulted in Quiñónez's allies winning, virtually assuring him victory in the presidential election. On 21 December 1918, Carlos resigned as president due to illness and Quiñónez assumed the presidency, disqualifying him from participating in the election. Quiñónez considered running anyway, and Palomo subsequently dropped out of the race because he did not want to run against the incumbent president. One week before the election, Quiñónez selected Jorge to be the PND's candidate. Landowner Arturo Araujo (no relation to Manuel Enrique Araujo) of the Salvadoran Laborist Party also announced his own campaign. In response, Jorge and Quiñónez ordered Supreme Court Chief Justice Pío Romero Bosque to run and they planned to have him receive more votes than Arturo Araujo to humiliate him. The election resulted in Jorge receiving 97 percent of the vote, Romero receiving 2 percent, and Arturo Araujo receiving 1 percent.

=== Violence and rebellions ===
Jorge was inaugurated as president of El Salvador on 1 March 1919. Carlos died on 8 October 1919 in New York City, United States due to complications from the same illness that had led to his resignation. In 1920, Arturo Araujo attempted to seize power by invading El Salvador from Honduras with an army of 300 to 1,000 militiamen, but Jorge's government repelled the invasion. During Jorge's presidency, he and Quiñónez expanded the PND's influence, and many of the party's local officials labeled independent politicians and non-PND members as enemies. The government also used the military to ensure that PND candidates won local elections and prevent factionalism.

Government–military relations began to deteriorate during Jorge's presidency, especially as the government cut army wages in 1919 due to budget deficits. The military was also dissatisfied with the treatment of the National Guard (a gendarmerie) which it saw as supplanting it in importance. In February 1922, 63 cadets of the Polytechnic School attempted a coup d'état against Jorge's government and killed around 50 loyalist soldiers. The coup failed and Jorge closed the school for four years. In May 1922, 200 soldiers of the 6th Infantry Brigade in San Salvador took control of their barracks and declared Jorge to be deposed. The rebelling soldiers failed to capture the El Zapote barracks; 40 were captured or killed while the remaining soldiers fled the country.

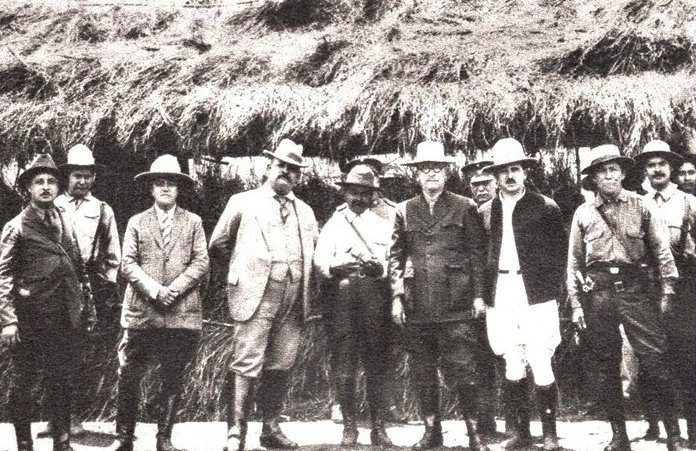
Alfonso Quiñónez Molina with members of his cabinet in 1926

Quiñónez was the PND's candidate in the 1923 presidential election. Miguel Tomás Molina, Jorge's former minister of government and one of Quiñónez's cousins, challenged Quiñónez's presidential bid. Jorge implemented a state of emergency that prevented Molina from holding political rallies to support his campaign. Despite the ban on rallies, Molina held a rally on 25 December 1922 in downtown San Salvador. The Red League, National Guard, National Police, and army shot at people attending the rally, killing around a dozen people and injuring around a hundred. Molina sought refuge in the Spanish embassy after the Christmas Day Massacre, and on election day, Quiñónez won unanimously with 178,000 votes. Romero was elected as his vice president, and they both assumed office on 1 March 1923. Quiñónez disbanded the Red League in 1923 after assuming the presidency because it began to engage in politics outside of his orders.

== Fall of the dynasty ==
=== Conflict with Romero ===
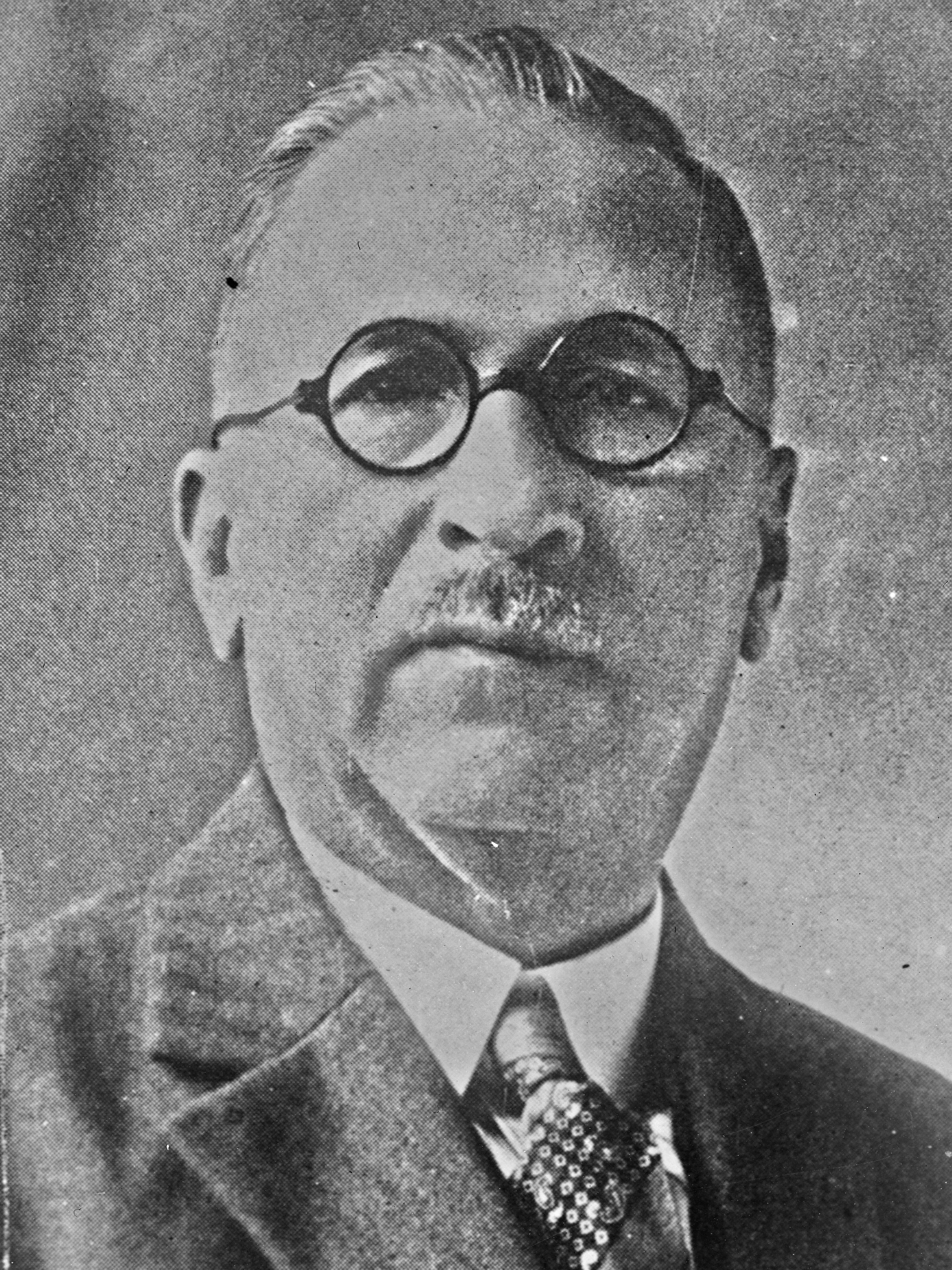
Pío Romero Bosque, Quiñónez's vice president and successor who ended the dynasty

As the 1927 presidential election approached, Quiñónez nominated Romero as his presidential successor. Romero agreed to retain certain political appointments made by Quiñónez as a precondition for Quiñónez picking him as the next president. Romero won the election unanimously and assumed office on 1 March 1927. Quiñónez expected to use Romero as a puppet ruler, and contemporary American diplomats such as Cornelius Van Hemert Engert and Jefferson Caffery also believed that Quiñónez would continue to rule El Salvador behind the scenes. In 1927, the Legislative Assembly appointed Quiñónez as the first presidential designee, second in line to the presidency after Vice President Gustavo Vides.

In April 1927, Romero backtracked on his agreement with Quiñónez to maintain existing political appointments by forcing two of his sub-secretaries to resign, which led to Quiñónez accusing him of failing to uphold his political promises. Engert believed that the forced resignations were part of a campaign by Romero to "do away with the Quinonez [sic] influence". That same month, Romero also lifted press censorship and the ban on public demonstrations and, soon after, University of El Salvador students protested in San Salvador against Quiñónez's appointment as the first presidential designate, even protesting in front of his home demanding his resignation. In June 1927, as Quiñónez's and Romero's supporters in the Legislative Assembly debated the constitutionality of Quiñónez's appointment, Quiñónez resigned and left with his family for exile in France.

=== 1927 pro-dynasty coup attempt ===
Jorge and Quiñónez plotted a coup to overthrow Romero's government to preserve the dynasty's influence in Salvadoran politics. Jorge was the coup's primary organizer and he recruited several of his and Quiñónez's allies to carry it out. Among those recruited to the plot were Federico Guillermo Kreitz (chief of police under the Meléndez–Quiñónez dynasty), Colonel Juan Enrique Aberle (the incumbent chief of the army's machine shop), and Major Manuel Alfaro Noguera (the incumbent deputy chief of police). Jorge and Kreitz recruited around 500 militiamen armed with machetes.

On 6 December 1927, Aberle and Noguera arrived at the country's police headquarters and told Chief of Police Colonel Enrique Leitzelar that an unspecified military junta had proclaimed Aberle as the country's president and Noguera as the new chief of police. Leitzelar demanded confirmation of this information from General Carlos Carmona Tadey, the commander of the 1st Infantry Regiment; Carmona (who was supposed to be a coup collaborator) denied any knowledge of Aberle and Noguera's proclamation. Both Aberle and Noguera then surrendered. When they were both brought before Romero himself, Aberle told Romero the same news that he had told Leitzelar and offered him and his family safe passage out of El Salvador if he resigned peacefully. Romero instead had Aberle and Noguera arrested, and had them both court martialed and executed by firing squad two days later. The 500 militiamen did not participate in the coup attempt, and Jorge subsequently fled the country to Honduras and later Costa Rica after being denied asylum by the United States embassy in El Salvador.

In a February 1928 interview with Montgomery Schuyler Jr. (former U.S. chargé d'affaires to El Salvador), Quiñónez expressed his sympathy to the coup and condemned the executions of Aberle and Noguera. Regarding his relationship with Romero, Quiñónez said:

"You know, of course, that we are no longer friends with Romero Bosque. We were old friends. He was in my government. I helped him greatly. But we have nothing to do with each other now."

The coup's failure ended the Meléndez–Quiñónez dynasty's influence in El Salvador. Romero went on to implement democratic reforms in El Salvador and allow for greater political participation. On 6 September 1927, Romero dissolved the National Democratic Party and banned politicians from running for election under its banner. While some candidates with no former ties to the PND were elected in 1927 and 1929 municipal elections, many politicians elected during the Meléndez–Quiñónez dynasty stayed in power. In the 1928 legislative election, Romero pre-selected a set of candidates that would ensure his political allies were elected. (Note: According to historian Erik Ching, the Salvadoran government pre-selecting legislative candidates was effectively a political tradition at this time, including during the Meléndez–Quiñónez dynasty.) Historian Erik Ching theorized that Romero did not extend his democratic reforms to the legislative election as he did not want to allow his enemies to potentially impeach him. Alberto Gómez Zárate (Romero's minister of war, the navy, and aviation) ran in the 1931 presidential election. Many saw him as being closely associated with the Meléndez–Quiñónez dynasty, and many former members of the PND supported his campaign. Ultimately, Arturo Araujo won the election, but he was overthrown by the military later that year, which ushered in five decades of military rule.

== Politics and policies ==
The Meléndez brothers and Quiñónez were all pragmatic liberals. Supporters and allies of the Meléndez–Quiñónez dynasty were known as melendistas or quiñonistas. The dynasty's supporters included indigenous Salvadorans, to whom the dynasty promised the restoration of land, and the country's wealthy landowners who benefited from the dynasty's economic policies.

=== Economics ===
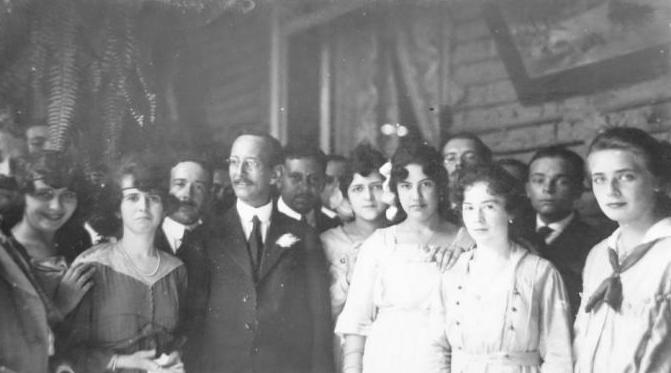
Jorge Meléndez with public workers in 1919

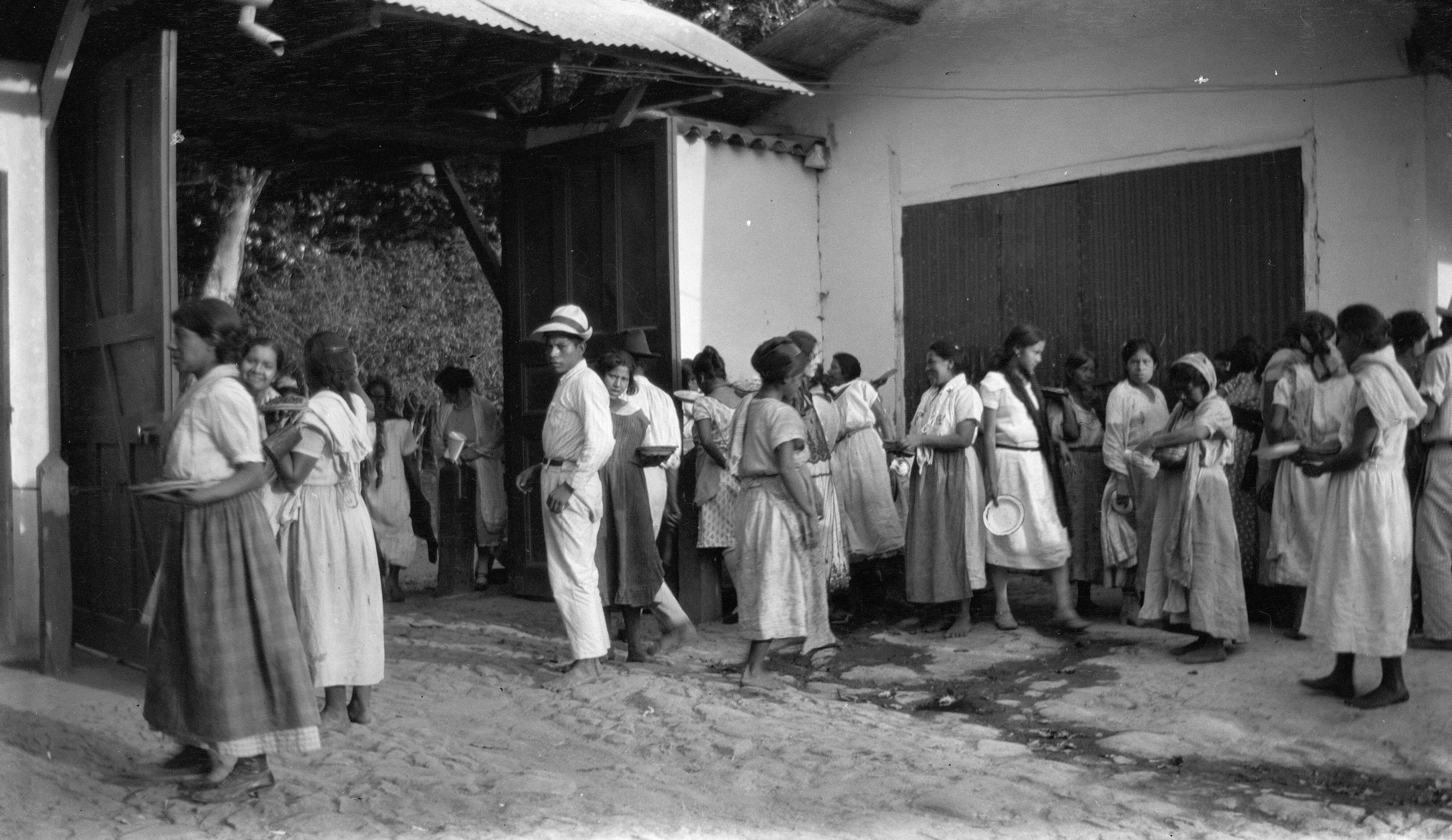
Salvadoran coffee plantation workers waiting in line to receive their wages in 1927

During the Meléndez–Quiñónez dynasty, the Salvadoran economy was heavily reliant on coffee exports. When the price of coffee exports fell during the Recession of 1920–1921, the Salvadoran government acquired loans from banks in the United States. These loans and subsequent spending led to an increase in American investments in El Salvador, and some Americans even immigrated to El Salvador and gained a controlling stake in El Salvador's coffee production. By 1926, El Salvador has doubled its pre-World War I coffee production and exported 110,000,000 pounds (50,000,000 kg) of coffee that year, becoming the leading coffee producer in Central America. This, together with record-high coffee prices up to SV₡32 per 100 pounds (45 kg) by 1927, led the country's economy to grow substantially. While coffee was El Salvador's main export, Salvadoran government officials and American immigrant merchants also sought to diversify El Salvador's economy by investing in cotton and sugar production. Corruption, embezzlement, and extortion were common during the Meléndez–Quiñónez dynasty.

The Meléndez–Quiñónez dynasty did not implement social reform programs, but it did allow and encourage urban laborers and artisans to organize and form unions. This led to the spread of ideologies such as socialism and communism among Salvadoran workers. While some urban workers' rights progressed, the government continued to protect the interests of the country's wealthy landowners through the National Guard and did not allow rural workers' living conditions to improve. In 1920, urban tailors held the first recorded strike in Salvadoran history to protest abuse from their employers. Other groups such as teachers, railroad workers, and bakers, among others, also held strikes throughout 1920 and 1921. Anarcho-syndicalist groups such as the Regional Federation of the Workers of El Salvador (FRTS) emerged during the 1920s and demanded land redistribution, an eight-hour workday, and literacy programs from the Meléndez–Quiñónez government.

=== Meléndez Doctrine ===
Carlos opposed the Bryan–Chamorro Treaty between Nicaragua and the United States as it appeared to infringe on Nicaragua's sovereignty and opened the possibility of a U.S. naval base being built in the Gulf of Fonseca. Carlos promoted the "Meléndez Doctrine" ("Doctrina Meléndez") that declared the Gulf of Fonseca as a "territorial bay" ("bahía territorial"), recognizing it as a condominium shared by El Salvador, Honduras, and Nicaragua instead of it being divided by the three countries. According to Salvadoran diplomat Rafael Guirola Duke, Carlos despised the U.S. and sympathized with the German Empire during World War I. As such, El Salvador remained neutral during the war and retained its embassies with both the German Empire and Austria-Hungary. Minister of Foreign Relations José Gustavo Guerrero later denounced the doctrine in 1928.

El Salvador briefly joined the short-lived Federation of Central America from 1921 to 1922. The federation failed in part due to Nicaragua's inability to join due to the Bryan–Chamorro Treaty and due to a coup d'état in Guatemala installing a military government that withdrew Guatemala from the federation.

== Wealth ==
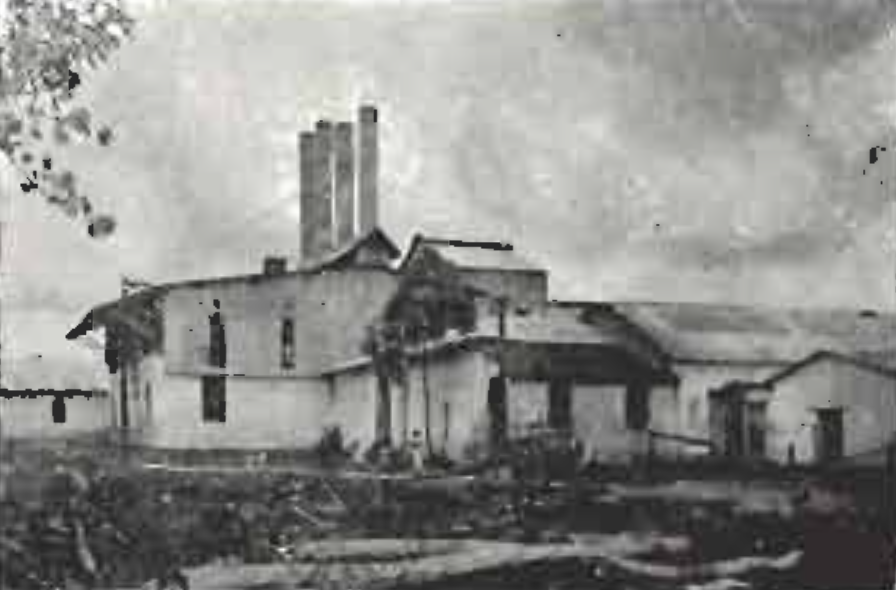
The Venecia sugar hacienda owned by Jorge Meléndez

Both the Meléndez and Quiñónez families were very wealthy and owned several properties including 16 haciendas and multiple coffee and sugar plantations. The Meléndez brothers were largest producers of sugar in El Salvador during the time of the Meléndez–Quiñónez dynasty. Ching wrote that North American and European visitors to El Salvador during the Meléndez–Quiñónez dynasty "did not miss on the opportunity to comment" on the wealth of Quiñónez and the Meléndez brothers. Jorge used his wealth to finance the failed December 1927 coup against Romero's government. Despite the Meléndez and Quiñónez families' wealth, many Salvadoran oligarchs looked down upon them as they had relatively recently earned their wealth.

== Timeline ==
The following graph visualizes the timeline of the presidencies of the Meléndez–Quiñónez dynasty, as well as those of Manuel Enrique Araujo (whose assassination led to the dynasty's rise) and Romero (whose policies ended the dynasty's influence). In total, the dynasty ruled El Salvador for 14 years and 20 days from 9 February 1913 to 1 March 1927.

== See also ==
- Norberto Ramírez, Carlos and Jorge's maternal grandfather
