= 1927 Salvadoran coup attempt =

Attempted overthrow of President Pío Romero Bosque

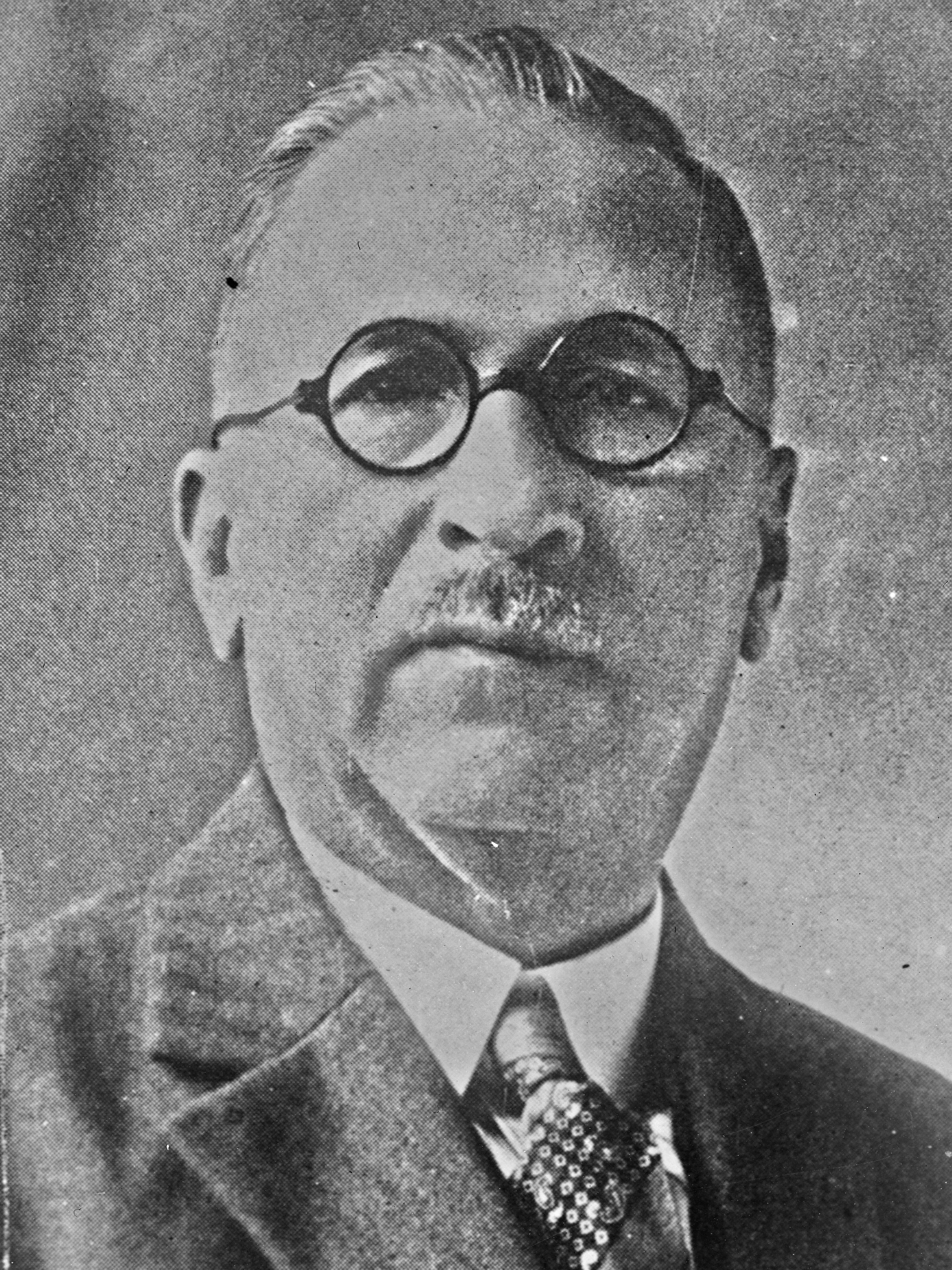
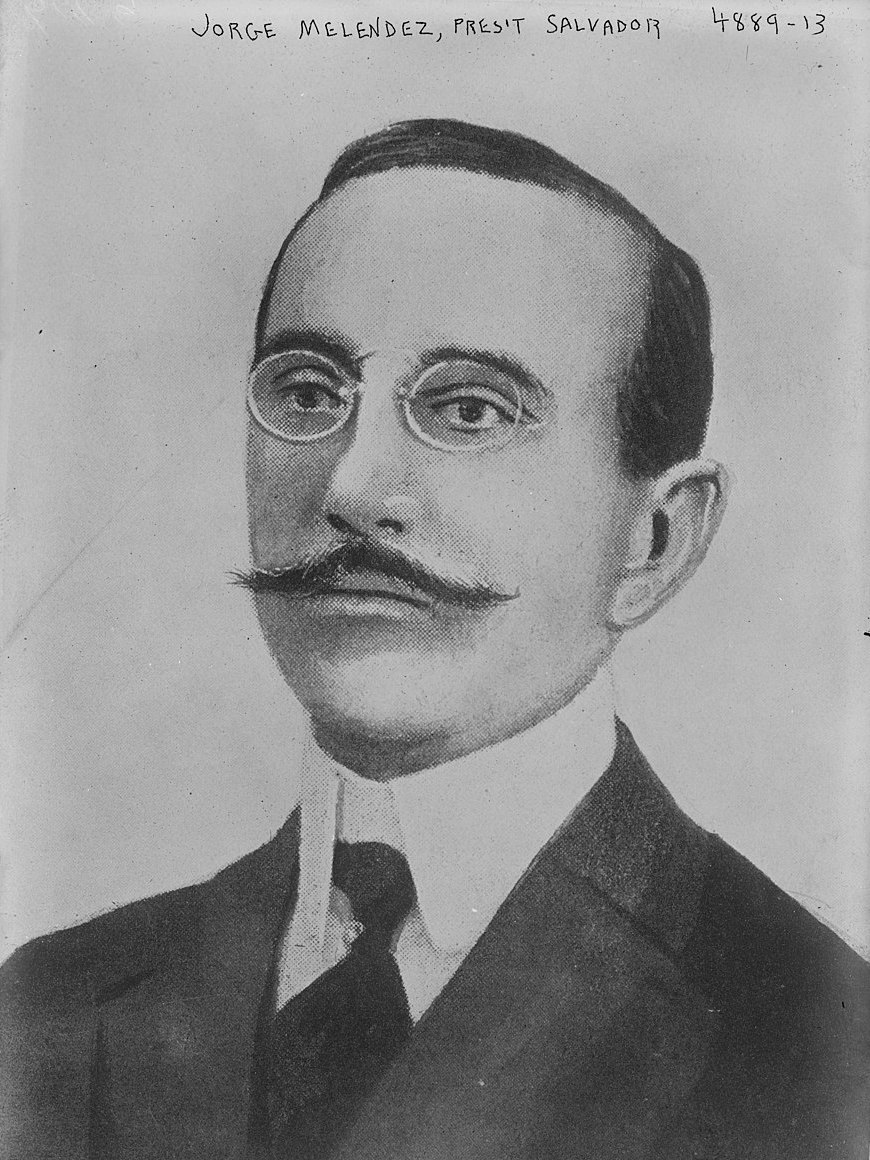
- President Pío Romero Bosque (left) and coup leader and former president Jorge Meléndez (right)
Date	6 December 1927
Location	San Salvador, El Salvador
Result	Coup failure

Belligerents
Salvadoran government	Meléndez–Quiñónez dynasty

Commanders and leaders
Pío Romero Bosque; Enrique Leitzelar	Jorge Meléndez; Alfonso Quiñónez Molina; Federico Kreitz (POW); Juan Enrique Aberle (executed); Manuel Alfaro Noguera (executed); Carlos Carmona (POW)

Strength
Unknown	500 militiamen

Casualties and losses
None	100+ arrested 2+ executed

On 6 December 1927, the Meléndez–Quiñónez political dynasty of El Salvador attempted to overthrow the government of President Pío Romero Bosque. Former presidents Jorge Meléndez and Alfonso Quiñónez Molina and former chief of police Federico Guillermo Kreitz attempted to overthrow Romero's government in an attempt to restore the political dynasty's power after Romero distanced himself from the dynasty's rule.

On 6 December, Colonel Juan Aberle and Major Manuel Noguera attempted to inform both Romero and police chief Colonel Enrique Leitzelar that a military junta had deposed Romero and elected Aberle as president. Both Romero and Leitzelar rejected this information and Romero had Aberle and Noguera arrested, court-martialed, and executed by firing squad. Hundreds of conspirators were arrested while Meléndez, the coup's chief plotter, fled El Salvador for exile.

== Background ==
From 1913 to 1927, the Meléndez–Quiñónez political dynasty controlled the government of El Salvador. The political dynasty alternated control of the presidency between family members. (Note: The presidents of the Meléndez–Quiñónez dynasty were Carlos Meléndez (1913–1914, 1915–1918), Alfonso Quiñónez Molina (1914–1915, 1918–1919, 1923–1927), and Jorge Meléndez (1919–1923).) In 1927, President Alfonso Quiñónez Molina was constitutionally term-limited. As there were no more family members that were willing the assume the presidency, Quiñónez selected Pío Romero Bosque, his Vice President and personal friend, to succeed him. Romero won the 1927 presidential election unanimously and became President on 1 March 1927.

Quiñónez planned to continue ruling El Salvador from behind the scenes and intended Romero to serve as merely a puppet ruler, but Romero broke with the Meléndez–Quiñónez dynasty. He forced two of Quiñónez's appointees—Undersecretary of Promotion Marcos A. Letona and Undersecretary of Public Instruction Salvador Rivas Vides—to resign as an effort to remove Quiñónez's influence from government. In April, Romero lifted a state of siege implemented during Quiñónez's presidency that allowed for freedom of the press and public demonstrations. Soon afterwards, University of El Salvador students organized protests against Quiñónez's appointment as the first presidential designate by the Legislative Assembly that placed him second in the line of succession to the presidency after Vice President Gustavo Vides. Quiñónez resigned from the position in June and left El Salvador for exile in France after the Legislative Assembly began a debate regarding the issue.

With Quiñónez out of the country, Romero implemented democratic reforms ahead of the 1927 legislative and municipal elections. He dissolved the ruling National Democratic Party (PND) and banned candidates from running under its banner in the election. Interior minister Manuel Vicente Mendoza assured that the government did not favor or back any candidates during the election, a break with prior practices where candidates were government sponsored.

== Coup attempt ==
=== Plotting ===
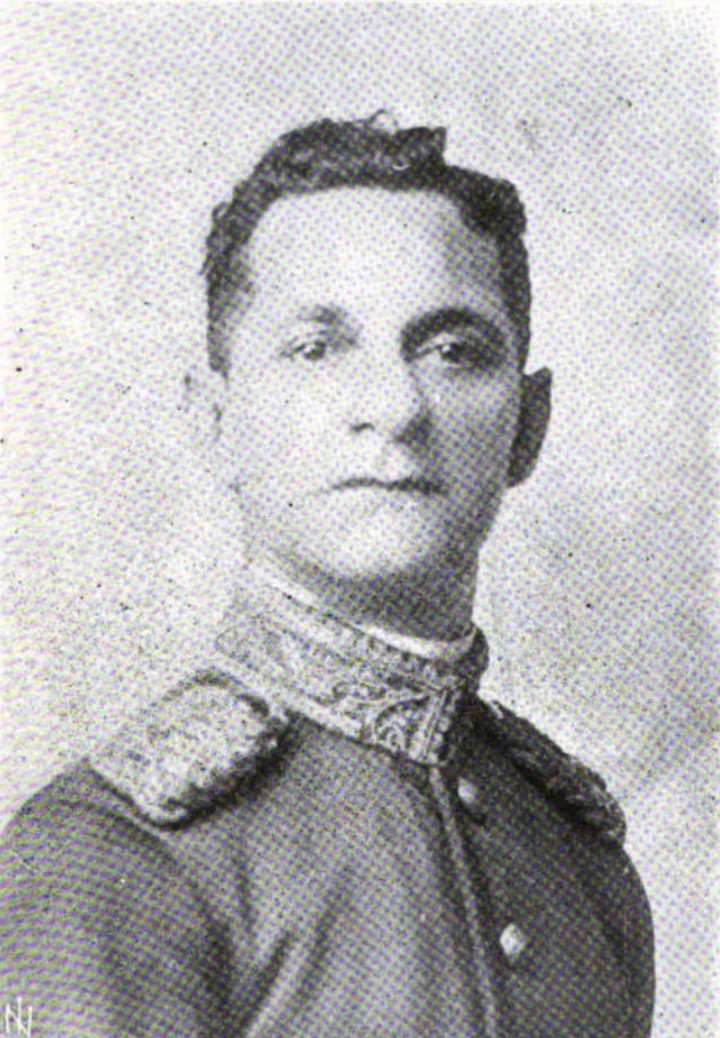
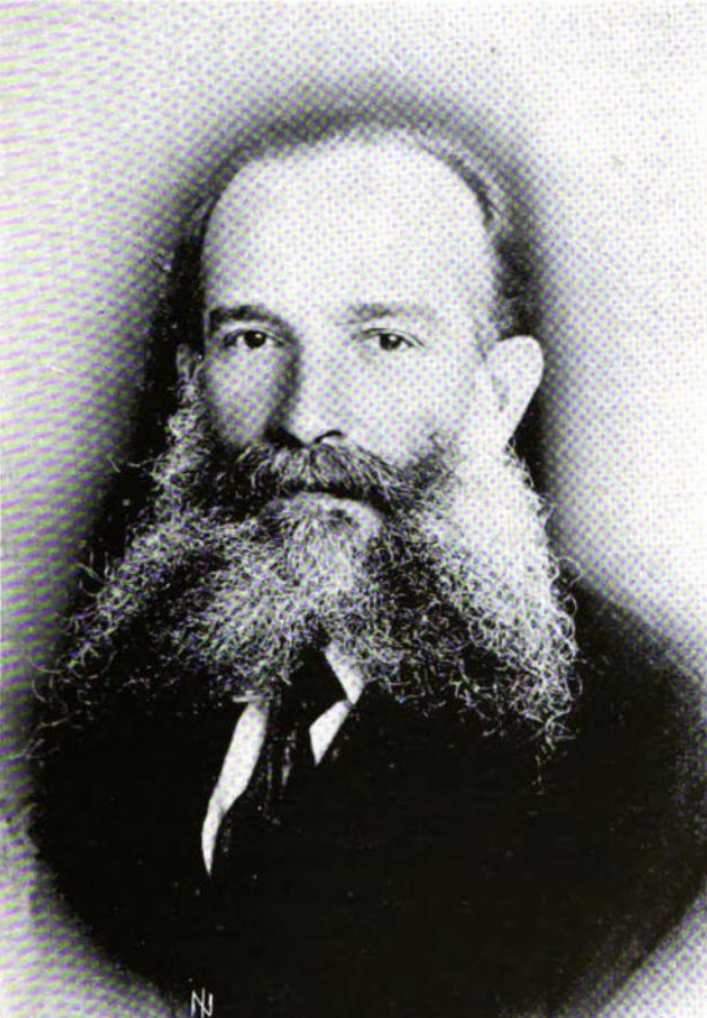
General Carlos Carmona Tadey (left) and Federico Guillermo Kreitz (right)

In late 1927, Quiñónez and Jorge Meléndez, another former president of the Meléndez–Quiñónez dynasty, began plotting a coup against Romero's government to preserve the dynasty's influence. Meléndez was the coup's primary organizer and financier. He recruited several of his and Quiñónez's allies to support the coup including Federico Guillermo Kreitz (Quiñónez's chief of the National Police), Colonel Juan Aberle (chief of the Salvadoran Army machine shop), and Major Manuel Noguera (deputy chief of the National Police). Meléndez and Kreitz recruited 500 laborers to serve as militiamen to support the coup. Aberle and Noguera were tasked with capturing the 1st Infantry Brigade's barracks and the National Police headquarters in San Salvador. They would then quietly depose Romero while the 500 militiamen would march into San Salvador from Meléndez's hacienda to cause a "diversionary disturbance".

=== Execution ===
On the morning of 6 December, Aberle and Noguera informed Colonel Enrique Leitzelar, the chief of the National Police, that a military junta had elected Aberle as El Salvador's president and appointed Noguera as the new chief of the National Police. Upon hearing this, Leitzelar demanded confirmation of this information from General Carlos Carmona Tadey, the commander of the 1st Infantry Brigade's barracks and the chief of the Salvadoran Air Fleet. Carmona supported the coup, but when Leitzelar demanded confirmation, Carmona denied any knowledge of the coup or of any military junta. Aberle and Noguera surrendered to Leitzelar after Carmona's denial.

Leitzelar presented Aberle and Noguera to Romero later that day at the National Palace. There, Aberle told Romero himself that a military junta had deposed him from the presidency, elected Aberle as president, and offered him and his family safe passage out of El Salvador. In response, Romero ordered Aberle and Noguera's arrest. The 500 militiamen never moved to San Salvador to cause the planned "diversionary disturbance".

== Aftermath ==
Aberle and Noguera were court-martialed and executed by firing squad 48 hours after their arrest. Over 100 conspirators were arrested for their involvement in the coup. Among those arrested were Kreitz, Carmona (who was also fired from his military positions), other military and government officials, and many militiamen. Meléndez evaded arrest. After the United States embassy rejected his asylum request, Meléndez fled El Salvador to Honduras and later Costa Rica where he settled in exile. Quiñónez remained in France during the coup. In a February 1928 interview with former US chargé d'affaires Montgomery Schuyler Jr., Quiñónez did not admit involvement but did express sympathies for the coup. He particularly condemned the executions of Aberle and Noguera. He remarked that he and Romero were no longer friends and "have nothing to do with each other now".

Romero promoted Leitzelar to brigadier general as a reward for helping stop the coup. Romero continued his democratic reforms in the aftermath of the coup. In 1930, he allowed for new political parties to form, and in 1931, El Salvador held a presidential election where no candidate was officially selected by Romero as his successor, a tradition that had occurred in every election since 1903. Romero's democratic reforms were short-lived as a coup d'état later that year overthrew Romero's successor, Arturo Araujo, and began nearly five-decades of military dictatorship.

== See also ==
- List of Salvadoran coup d'états
