= Red League =

Paramilitary in El Salvador

- Liga Roja
- Leader: Alfonso Quiñónez Molina
- Dates active: 1918–1923
- Country: El Salvador
- Allegiance: National Democratic Party
- Ideology: Populism; Socialism (self-claimed)
- Status: Dissolved

The Red League (Spanish: Liga Roja) was a paramilitary organization that existed in El Salvador from 1918 to 1923. The Red League, affiliated with the National Democratic Party (PND), defended the interests of the ruling Meléndez–Quiñónez dynasty. The Red League was responsible for political violence and repression during the 1919 and 1923 presidential elections, including the Christmas Day Massacre that killed "dozens".

== History ==
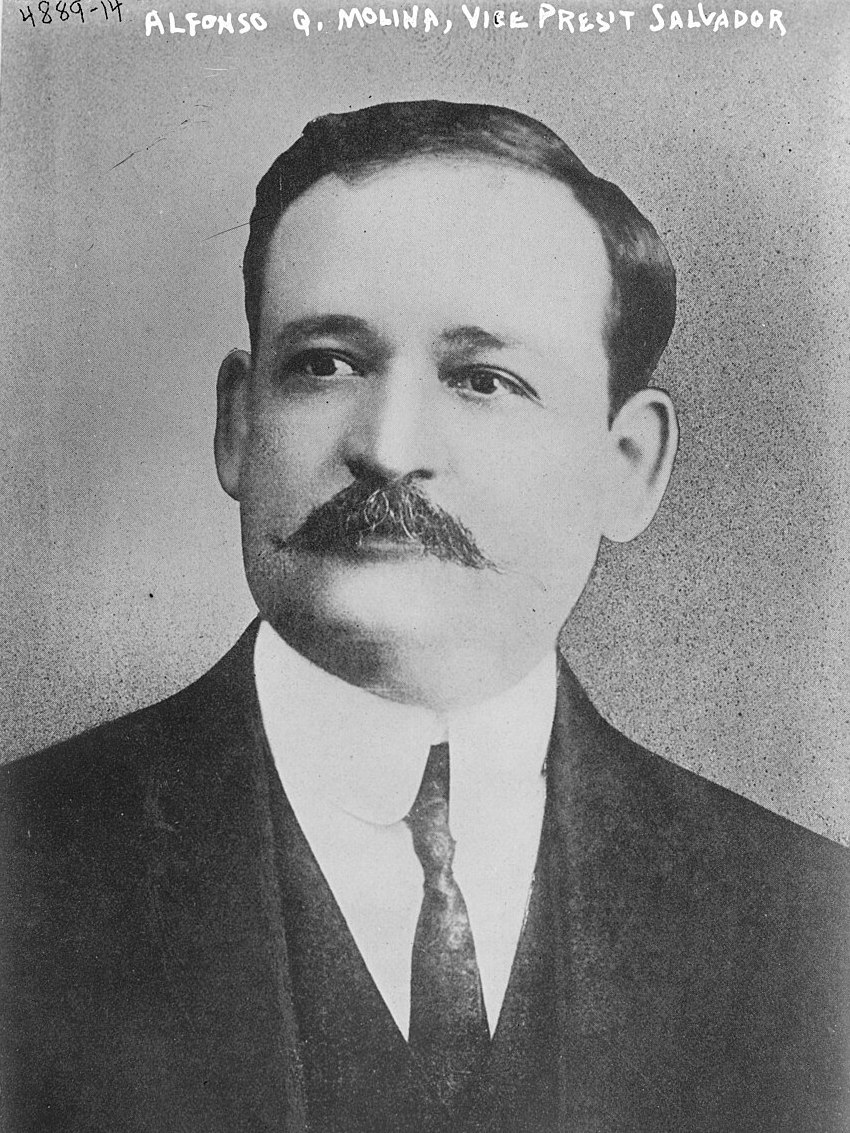
Alfonso Quiñónez Molina, the Red League's founder and leader

The Red League was established by Salvadoran vice president Alfonso Quiñónez Molina in late 1918 to support his candidacy during the 1919 presidential election. The Red League was the paramilitary wing of the National Democratic Party (PND), Quiñónez's political party. Quiñónez also possibly established the Red League to function as a loyal alternative to the armed forces which distrusted the ruling Meléndez–Quiñónez dynasty.

The Red League was tasked with intimidating Quiñónez's political opponents and disrupting opposition rallies and public meetings, particularly those of Tomás García Palomo, Quiñónez's chief opponent. According to Enrique Córdova, one of Quiñónez's government officials, the Red League "alarm[ed] that sector of the population not allied with Quiñónez". Clashes between the Red League and Quiñónez's opponents during the 1918 municipal elections resulted in around 100 deaths and 200 injuries. President Carlos Meléndez resigned shortly after the municipal election and Quiñónez became president, disqualifying him from running in the 1919 presidential election. Quiñónez picked Carlos Meléndez's brother, Jorge Meléndez, to be the PND's presidential candidate instead and the Red League focused its efforts on supporting Jorge Meléndez's campaign. After the election, the Salvadoran government ordered the National Guard to surround the home of Arturo Araujo (another opposition presidential candidate) in part due to fears that the Red League's members would rally around Araujo as a leader.

"The [Red League] marchers were lined up in perfect order, subject to the discipline of their various [bosses], for the [National Democratic Party] is not an unruly and incoherent mob [...] but an organized conglomeration of men that moves as an army, obedient to the orders of their captains [...] that great meeting of men moved harmoniously as battalions that would pass review in a military parade. It was a brilliant spectacle."

— Diario del Salvador, 11 December 1920

The Red League continued to intimidate opponents during local and legislative elections. Quiñónez ran for president again during the 1923 presidential election. The Red League continued to attack his opponents, most notably, those of Miguel Tomás Molina (one of Quiñónez's cousins). It also held a rally on 10 December 1922 in San Salvador in support of Quiñónez. On 25 December, the Red League attacked one of Molina's campaign rallies in downtown San Salvador. The ensuing Christmas Day Massacre killed, according to historian Erik Ching, "dozens" and injured over 100. The massacre forced Molina to seek refuge in the Spanish embassy and Quiñónez won the 1923 election unanimously.

After Quiñónez's election victory, he disbanded the Red League. By July 1923, United States chargé d'affaires Montgomery Schuyler Jr. noted that the Red League had "very largely dissolved". Quiñónez's reason for disbanding the paramilitary is unclear, but historian Patricia Alvarenga hypothesized that it was because local Red League leaders were acting outside of Quiñónez's orders.

== Structure ==
The Red League's members consisted peasants and laborers led by Quiñónez's local political allies. Many were conscripted by wealthy landowners. Red League members were provided free food to encourage them to attend PND political rallies. While the Red League promoted vague socialist messaging, Alvarenga identified the Red League as a populist organization that rallied support from Salvadoran peasants, and especially indigenous Salvadorans. According to Alvarenga, "for Indians, the [Red League] represented the opportunity to gain access to a new institution that could permit them to consolidate their power against both ladinos and central government representatives".

Red League members wore military-like uniforms. They bore the insignia of a bleeding machete and it flew a red flag. The Red League was led by several local bosses consisting of either landowners, PND officials, or both. According to Schuyler, the Red League appeared "to be organized somewhat on the lines of the ancient feudal system, various land owners being expected to furnish their respective quotas".

== Legacy ==
According to Ching, the Red League was a "key pillar" of the Meléndez–Quiñónez dynasty. Despite this, he noted that sources regarding the paramilitary are scarce, such as with the names Red League local bosses and more so the names of its rank-and-file. Some known Red League leaders include Elias Barriere in Tenancingo, Rodolfo Brito in Nahuizalco, Isidoro Gonzalez and Alberto Guadron in Colón, Domingo Guzmán in Yayantique, Francisco and Rubén Parrilla in Nueva Concepción, and Carlos Portillo in Chalchuapa. Federico Guillermo Kreitz, Quiñónez's police chief, was also a Red League boss.

Salvadoran writers portrayed the Red League as a symbol of militarism, violence, and authoritarianism in El Salvador.

== See also ==
- Death squads in El Salvador
