= 1919 Salvadoran presidential election =

- 13–15 January 1919 (Note: According to the Bulletin of the Pan American Union, the election was held between 12 and 14 January 1919.)
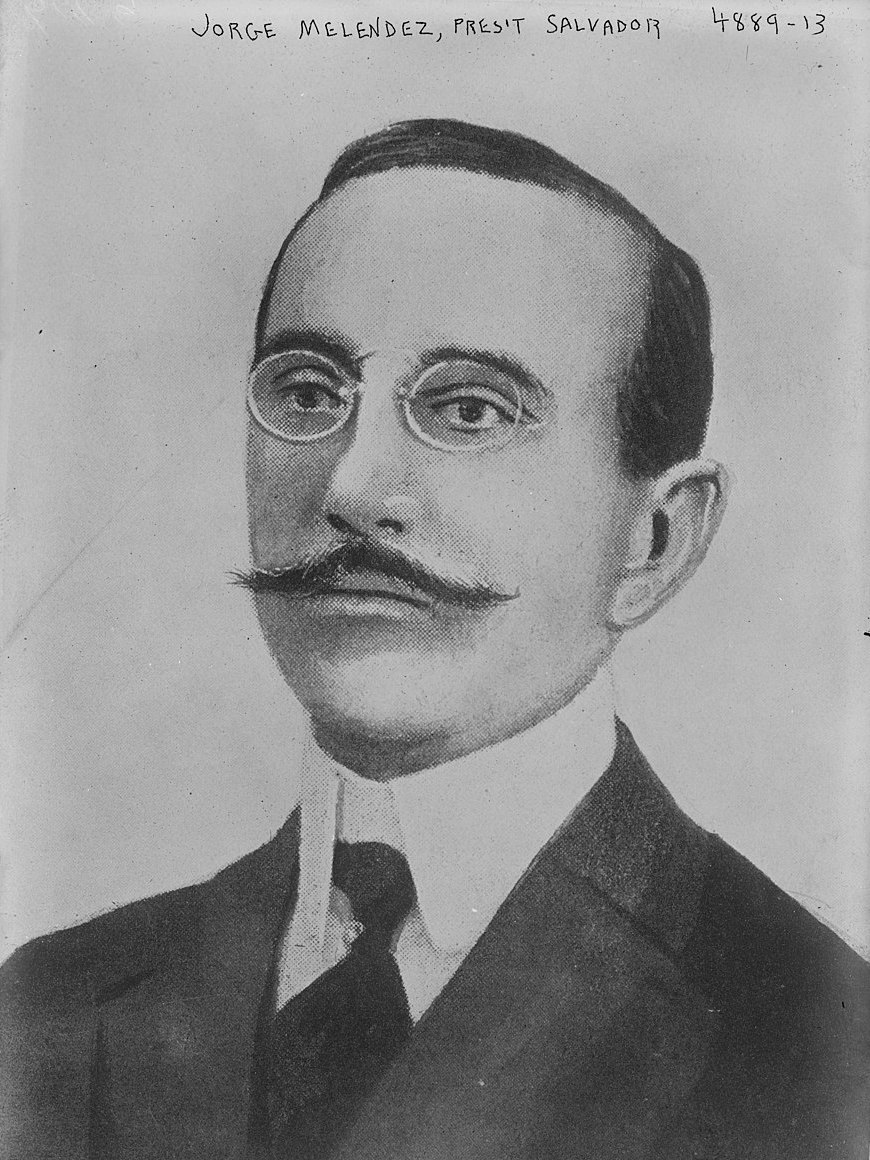

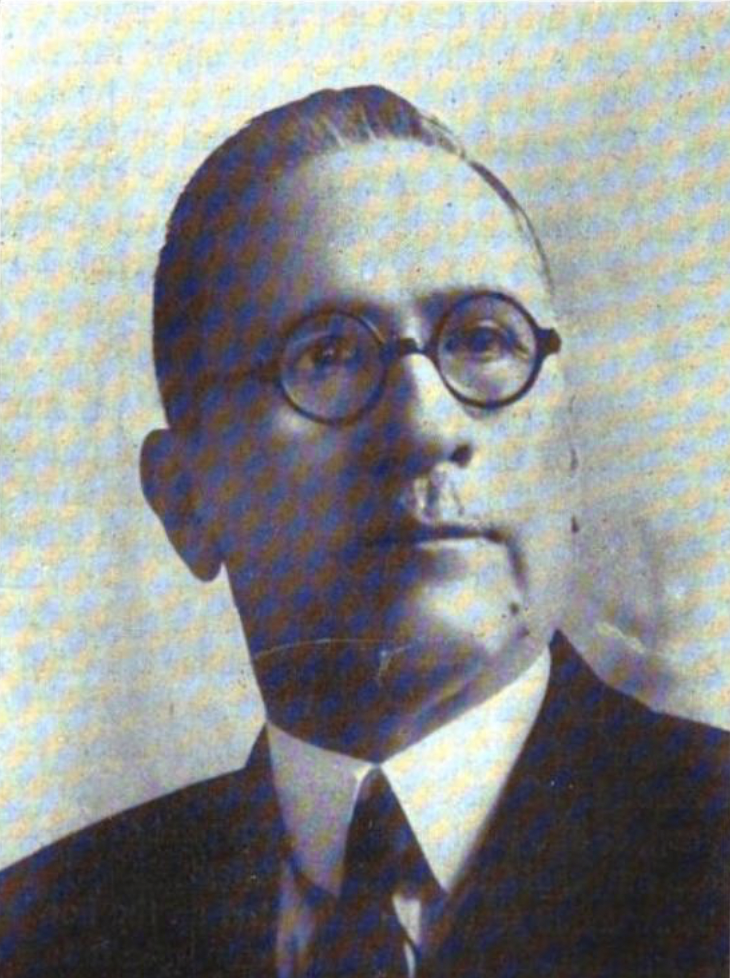
Candidate	Jorge Meléndez	Pío Romero Bosque
Party	National Democratic	National Democratic
Popular vote	166,441	4,370
Percentage	96.86%	2.54%
President before election
Alfonso Quiñónez Molina
National Democratic
Elected President
Jorge Meléndez
National Democratic

A presidential election was held in El Salvador between 13 and 15 January 1919, when Salvadorans elected their next president to serve a four-year term from 1919 to 1923. In the election, Jorge Meléndez defeated Pío Romero Bosque and Arturo Araujo; Provisional president Alfonso Quiñónez Molina was elected as Jorge's vice president.

As the election approached, Vice President Quiñónez and Minister of Governance and Finance Tomás García Palomo were the two most likely presidential successors to Carlos Meléndez, but Carlos did not name a successor as had been done in prior elections. Both Quiñónez and Palomo sought to influence the outcome of the 1918 municipal election in order to benefit their presidential campaigns. Carlos resigned due to poor health on 21 December 1918, and Quiñónez became the provisional president. Palomo withdrew his candidacy as he did not want to run against the incumbent president, and Quiñónez also withdrew due to a constitutional restriction on him running for election.

Quiñónez installed Carlos' younger brother Jorge as the National Democratic Party's presidential candidate, but his candidacy was challenged by landowner Arturo Araujo of the Salvadoran Laborist Party (PLS). Jorge and Quiñónez had Supreme Court president Pío Romero Bosque announce his own candidacy and proceeded to rig the election so that Jorge would come in first place, Romero would come in second, and Araujo would come in third. Jorge and Quiñónez assumed office in March 1919 as president and vice president respectively and they would rule El Salvador until 1927.

== Campaign ==
=== Before the 1918 municipal election ===
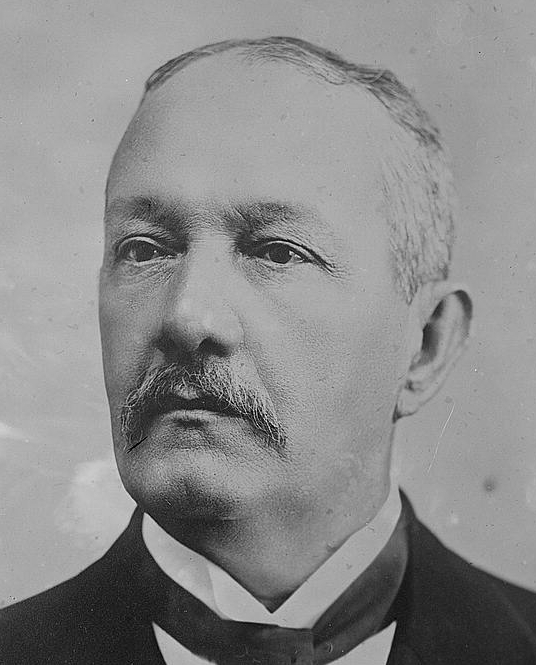
President Carlos Meléndez, who was ineligible to run for re-election

A presidential election was scheduled to be held in El Salvador between 13 and 15 January 1919 in order to elect the country's president, who would serve from 1 March 1919 to 1 March 1923. All men were eligible to vote.

Incumbent president Carlos Meléndez was constitutionally prohibited from running for re-election. Due to this, Vice President Alfonso Quiñónez Molina (Carlos' brother-in-law) and Minister of Governance and Finance Tomás García Palomo (Carlos' friend and personal physician) were seen as the two most likely presidential successors. Carlos, breaking from the tradition of his predecessors, did not hand-pick a presidential successor. He never gave a reason for not picking a successor, but Minister of War, the Navy, and Aviation Enrique Córdova speculated that the reason was that Carlos did not want to have to choose between a friend or a family member.

Ahead of the 1918 municipal elections, both Quiñónez and Palomo used their political influences to get allies elected to the country's municipalities. Having allies in control of municipalities allowed both men to influence how votes would be cast in polling stations during the 1919 presidential election. Palomo convinced many military officers to support him, and Quiñónez accused him of attempting to influence the election. In mid 1918, Quiñónez established the National Democratic Party (PND) to support his presidential campaign as well as the Red League paramilitary. On 7 December 1919, the day before the municipal election, Córdova received several telegraphs warning him that militants supporting Quiñónez and Palomo were being mobilized. Quiñónez was supported by city workers while Palomo was supported by rural peasants. On election day, their militias engaged in violence at polling stations seeking to get their preferred candidates election. These clashes resulted in over 100 deaths and 200 injuries according to the United States legation to El Salvador. Quiñónez's candidates won the majority of municipal races once all votes were counted, but the violence resulted in few votes actually being cast.

=== After the 1918 municipal election ===
A few days after the municipal election, Carlos suffered an "attack of paralysis" (likely a stroke or a heart attack) and he resigned the presidency to Quiñónez due to poor health on 21 December 1918. Upon Quiñónez's ascension as provisional president, Palomo withdrew from the election due to not wanting to run against the now incumbent president. Although Quiñónez's municipal candidates had won and he was now unopposed, effectively guaranteeing him the presidency, Quiñónez also withdrew from the election as the constitution of El Salvador prohibited individuals from running for election if they held the presidency for six months prior to the end of a presidential term.

"[I]t was carefully planned that Dr. Pío Romero Bosque should receive second greatest number of votes and accordingly voters were sent by the Melendez-Quinonez [sic] party to cast their votes for Dr. Bosque."

— Frank D. Arnold, interim chargé d'affaires of the United States to El Salvador, 16 January 1919

Quiñónez wanted to hand-pick Minister of Foreign Relations Francisco Martínez Suárez as the next president, but Martínez declined. Quiñónez then considered continuing to seek the presidency, but he eventually decided to appoint Jorge Meléndez, Carlos' younger brother, as the PND's presidential candidate one week before the election. Shortly after Jorge's candidacy was announced, landowner Arturo Araujo of the Salvadoran Laborist Party (PLS) announced his candidacy. In response, Quiñónez and Jorge installed Pío Romero Bosque, an ally and the president of the Supreme Court of Justice, as a third candidate and instructed polling stations to tabulate their votes in favor of Jorge first, Romero second, and Araujo third. Some polling stations were even instructed to tabulate votes in favor of Romero over Jorge. According to historian Erik Ching, Romero receiving more votes than Araujo was a part of Jorge and Quiñónez's plan to "humiliate" Araujo. On some occasions, Jorge's supporters traveled to multiple polling stations to cast multiple votes his favor. Ching described this voter fraud as "standard practice".

== Results ==
In total, 185,492 votes were cast in the presidential election and 89,582 votes were cast in the vice presidential election. According to the final results, Jorge came in first with 166,441 votes, Romero came in second with 4,370 votes, and Araujo came in third with 1,022 votes. Quiñónez was elected as Jorge's vice president.

Candidate	Party	Votes	%
Jorge Meléndez	National Democratic Party	166,441	96.86
Pío Romero Bosque	National Democratic Party	4,370	2.54
Arturo Araujo	Salvadoran Laborist Party	1,022	0.59
Total		171,833	100.00
Total votes		185,492	–
Source: Ching 1997, p. 251 and the Bulletin of the Pan American Union

== Aftermath ==
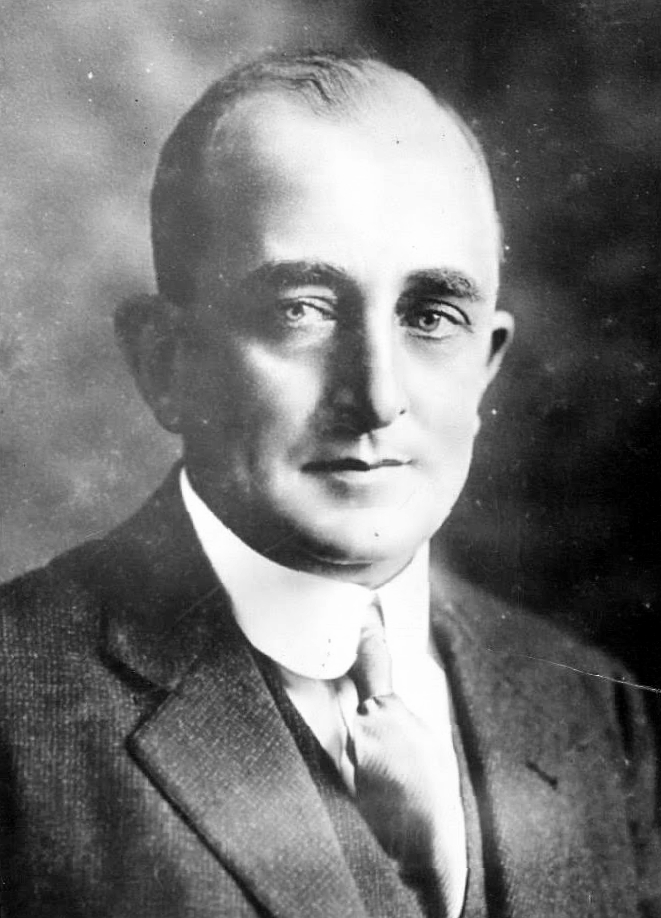
Arturo Araujo, who later became president in 1931 after his loss in 1919

On 1 March 1919, Jorge and Quiñónez assumed office as president and vice president, respectively. Romero was appointed as the minister of war, the navy, and aviation. Araujo rejected the results of the election and plotted a coup to overthrow Jorge's government. Araujo's plot was discovered by Salvadoran authorities and he subsequently fled the country to Honduras in March 1920 after a shootout at his hacienda in Armenia. In May 1920, Araujo commanded an army numbering 300 to 1,000 men and invaded El Salvador, seeking to forcefully take the presidency for himself. He captured the municipality of Arcatao, but his army was soon defeated and he was forced to flee back to Honduras. Araujo was permitted to return to El Salvador in 1923.

During Jorge's presidency, he and Quiñónez sought to consolidate their power through the PND and eliminate any potential rivals both within and outside the party. The government also utilized the military and the Red League to force polling stations to ensure that the government's preferred candidate won in municipal elections. Jorge ruled El Salvador until 1923. when he was succeeded by Quiñónez; he ruled until 1927 when he was succeeded by Romero, who, instead of continuing the PND's political dynasty as expect, introduced democratic reforms and forced Quiñónez, Jorge, and their supporters to flee the country. Romero's democratic reforms culminated in Araujo being elected as president during the 1931 presidential election. His presidency was short-lived, however, as he was overthrown in December 1931 and his vice president, General Maximiliano Hernández Martínez became president and served until his overthrow in 1944.

== Works cited ==
- Bulletin of the Pan American Union. Vol. 48. Washington, D.C., United States: United States Government Publishing Office. 1919.
- Ching, Erik K. (1997). From Clientelism to Militarism: The State, Politics and Authoritarianism in El Salvador, 1840–1940. Santa Barbara, California: University of California, Santa Barbara. OCLC 39326756. ProQuest 304330235.
- Krennerich, Michael (2005). "El Salvador". In Nohlen, Dieter (ed.). Elections in the Americas A Data Handbook Volume 1: North America, Central America, and the Caribbean. Oxford, United Kingdom: Oxford University Press. pp. 270–299. ISBN 9780191557934. OCLC 58051010.
- "La Solemne Transmisión de la Presidencia Constitucional de la República al Señor Don Jorge Meléndez" [The Solemn Transmission of the Constitutional Presidency of the Republic to Mr. Don Jorge Meléndez] (PDF). Diario Oficial (in Spanish). Vol. 86, no. 51. 1 March 1919. pp. 411–415. Archived from the original (PDF) on 12 April 2023.
