= 1928 Salvadoran legislative election =

January 1928	1929 →
- All 42 seats in the Legislative Assembly; 22 seats needed for a majority
Party	Leader	Seats
National Democratic		42
This lists parties that won seats. See the complete results below.

Legislative elections were held in El Salvador in January 1928. The result was a victory for the National Democratic Party, which won all 42 seats.

== Results ==
Party	Seats
National Democratic Party	42
Total	42
Source: Political Handbook of the World
