= Christmas Day Massacre (El Salvador) =

1922 massacre in El Salvador

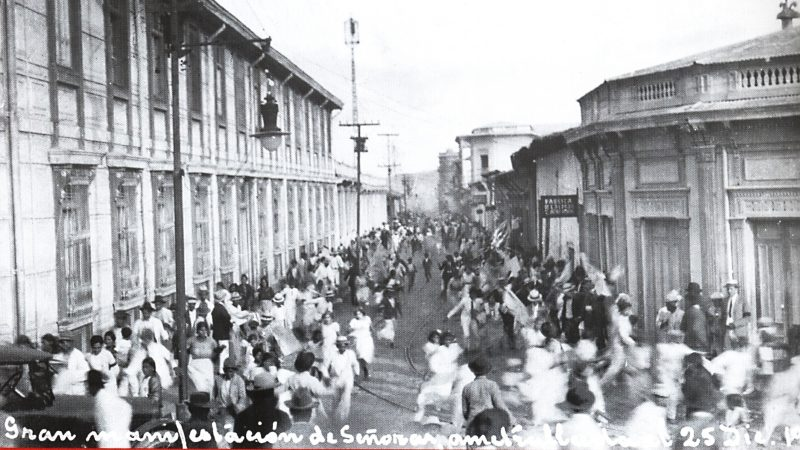
- Rally attendants fleeing the massacre site

- San Salvador (El Salvador)
- Location: 13°41′51″N 89°11′28″W; San Salvador, El Salvador
- Date: 25 December 1922; 103 years ago approximately 4:00 p.m.
- Target: Pro-Miguel Tomás Molina political rally
- Attack type: Massacre
- Deaths: "Dozens"
- Injuries: 100+
- Perpetrators: Red League; Salvadoran Army; National Guard; National Police

The Christmas Day Massacre occurred on 25 December 1922 in San Salvador, El Salvador when members of El Salvador's security forces and the paramilitary Red League shot at a crowd of people supporting the presidential campaign of Miguel Tomás Molina.

== Background ==
Ahead of the 1923 Salvadoran presidential election, the National Democratic Party (PND) chose Vice President Alfonso Quiñónez Molina as its presidential candidate to extend the rule of the governing Meléndez–Quiñónez dynasty. Miguel Tomás Molina, a former government minister and Quiñónez's cousin, declared that he would challenge Quiñónez to the presidency as a member of the Constitutional Party. President Jorge Meléndez declared a state of emergency that banned political rallies, and Molina accused the government of repression.

== Massacre ==
On the afternoon of 25 December 1922, Molina held a political rally in downtown San Salvador. The rally included a large contingent of women belonging to the Constitutional Party's feminine committee that hoped Molina would grant women universal suffrage if elected. Around 100 members of the Red League, a paramilitary organization of the PND, as well as members of the Salvadoran Army's cavalry regiment, the National Guard, and the National Police attacked and shot at the crowd. The massacre resulted in "dozens" of deaths and over 100 injuries.

== Aftermath ==
After the massacre, the Salvadoran government continued to repress members of the Constitutional Party. Molina and several of his advisors sought refuge at the Spanish embassy in San Salvador. In January 1923, Meléndez told U.S. ambassador Montgomery Schuyler Jr. that he expressed "great regret" that "circumstances [in El Salvador] do not permit an unrestricted political campaign". In December 1923, Meléndez reportedly offered a toast to the massacre at a bar. Molina called for his supporters to boycott the election. Quiñónez won the election unanimously with 178,000 votes, and he assumed office on 1 March 1923.

On 6 May 1931, the Legislative Assembly of El Salvador established a committee to investigate crimes committed by the Meléndez–Quiñónez dynasty that had fallen from power in 1927. Among the crimes the committee sought to investigate was the Christmas Day Massacre. The investigation was abandoned after the 1931 Salvadoran coup d'état.

== See also ==
- List of massacres in El Salvador
