= Jorge Meléndez =

President of El Salvador from 1919 to 1923

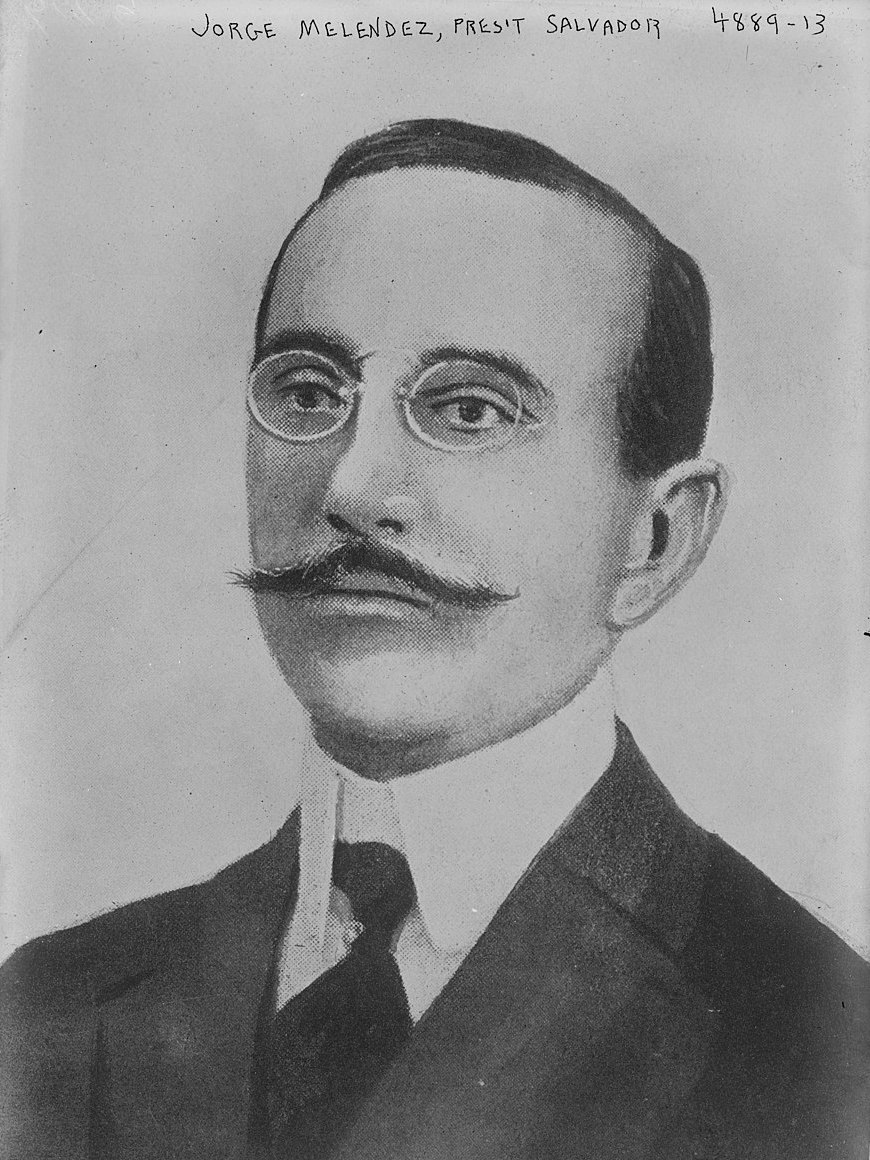
- Meléndez in 1919

23rd President of El Salvador
- In office 1 March 1919 – 1 March 1923
- Vice President: Alfonso Quiñónez Molina
- Preceded by: Alfonso Quiñónez Molina (provisional)
- Succeeded by: Alfonso Quiñónez Molina

Personal details
- Born: Jorge Meléndez Ramírez; 15 April 1871 San Salvador, El Salvador
- Died: 22 November 1953 (aged 82) San Salvador, El Salvador
- Party: National Democratic Party
- Spouse: Tula Mazzini
- Children: 3
- Relatives: Norberto Ramírez (grandfather); Carlos Meléndez (brother); Alfonso Quiñónez Molina (brother-in-law)
- Occupation: Politician, businessman

Jorge Meléndez Ramírez (15 April 1871 – 22 November 1953) was a Salvadoran politician and businessman who served as the 23rd President of El Salvador from 1919 to 1923. The presidency was the only political office Meléndez ever held. He was the younger brother of President Carlos Meléndez.

Meléndez became the 1919 presidential candidate for the National Democratic Party (PND) after Carlos resigned as President and the election's frontrunners, Alfonso Quiñónez Molina and Tomás Palomo, dropped out. Meléndez won the election with almost 97 percent of the vote and assumed office on 1 March 1919. During his presidency, the PND centralized power and monopolized local patronage networks. Meléndez suppressed several coups against his rule. He was succeeded in 1923 by Quiñónez, who had served as his vice president. Meléndez's presidency was a part of the broader Meléndez–Quiñónez dynasty that ruled El Salvador from 1913 to 1927. Meléndez tried to overthrow President Pío Romero Bosque in 1927 as he attempted to curb the dynasty's influence, but the coup failed and Meléndez left El Salvador for exile in Costa Rica.

== Early life ==
Jorge Meléndez Ramírez was born on 15 April 1871 in San Salvador, El Salvador. His parents were Rafael Meléndez, a tailor, and Mercedes Ramírez. Meléndez was one of nine children. Through Meléndez's mother, he was a grandson of Norberto Ramírez, the president of El Salvador in from 1840 to 1841.

== Early political career ==
=== Entry to politics ===
On 9 February 1913, Salvadoran president Manuel Enrique Araujo was assassinated and Meléndez's older brother Carlos Meléndez became the country's provisional president. At the time, Meléndez was a political novice and had never held public office unlike Carlos who had served on the municipal council of San Salvador and ran for president on several occasions during the 1890s and 1900s. Carlos was inaugurated as president on 1 March 1915; Alfonso Quiñónez Molina, his and Meléndez's brother-in-law through Quiñónez's marriage to their sister Leonor, was Vice President. Carlos' presidency began a period in Salvadoran history known as the Meléndez–Quiñónez dynasty.

"Why would capitalists risk their money by investing it in a transport business, for example, when in the morning, General X, jefe of a revolutionary band, expropriates it? Why would they put their money into useful enterprises when just as quickly it is extracted by an exaggerated tribute decreed by some irresponsible government born in the clamor of gunfire? [...] It is necessary that politics be guided along a path that little by little dispenses with the gangrene of personalism, the primordial cause of our instability."

— Jorge Meléndez in Economic Orientations of President Meléndez, 14 September 1917

Meléndez supported Carlos' presidency. In 1917, Meléndez wrote a pamphlet titled Economic Orientations of President Meléndez praising Carlos' presidency as a victory of "civilized society" over caudillismo. He argued that Carlos' centralization of power was preferable to the factionalized violence and military uprisings that were common in 19th century Salvadoran politics.

=== 1919 presidential campaign ===
Ahead of the 1919 presidential election, Quiñónez and Minister of Governance and Finance Tomás García Palomo were the election's frontrunners. On 21 December 1918, Carlos resigned as President as he suffered a paralytic attack ten days prior and Quiñónez succeeded him as provisional president. Now that Quiñónez was provisional president, he was constitutionally prohibited from running in the election as he was in the office six months prior to the next presidential term. Palomo also dropped out of the race as he did not want to run against the incumbent president.

In January 1919, one week before the election, Quiñónez selected Meléndez to replace him as the presidential candidate for the National Democratic Party (PND), the party Quiñónez established to initially get himself elected before he became ineligible. Landowner Arturo Araujo of the Salvadoran Laborist Party announced that he would challenge Meléndez's campaign. In response, Meléndez and Quiñónez ordered Pío Romero Bosque, the chief justice of the Supreme Court of Justice, to run in the election so that they could humiliate Araujo by making him finish in third place behind Meléndez and Romero. Polling stations were ordered to prevent Araujo's supporters from voting and to also tabulate most votes in favor of Meléndez, the second most in Romero's favor, and allocate whatever was left to Araujo. The final results declared that Meléndez won 166,441 votes (96.86%), Romero won 4,370 votes (2.54%), and Araujo won 1,022 votes (0.59%).

== President of El Salvador ==
Meléndez was inaugurated as President of El Salvador on 1 March 1919. Quiñónez was his vice president. Meléndez's cabinet consisted of Miguel Tomás Molina (a cousin of Quiñónez) as Minister of Government, Promotion, and Agriculture; José Esperanza Suay as Minister of Finance and Public Credit; Juan José Paredes as Minister of External Relations, Public Instruction, Justice, and Charity; and Romero as Minister of War and the Navy. During Meléndez's presidency, the PND centralized power and all political patronage networks and used the Red League (a paramilitary initially formed by Quiñónez to support his 1919 campaign) to enforce government control.

=== Social and economic policies ===
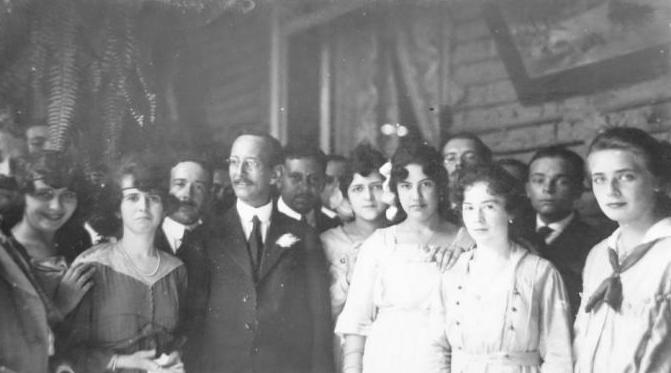
Meléndez with public workers in 1919

Meléndez was a pragmatic liberal. Before becoming president, Meléndez promised to allowed trade unions to organize. This did occur and Meléndez's government actively encouraged urban laborers and artisans to unionize. These unions led to the spread of ideologies such as socialism among Salvadoran workers. In 1920, tailors held the first urban strike in Salvadoran history. While unions were allowed to form, Meléndez did not implement wider social reforms. He also only allowed urban unions to form and not rural unions.

During the Recession of 1920–1921, Meléndez's government acquired loans from several United States banks that led to an increase in American investments in El Salvador. Meléndez turned a blind eye to corruption and embezzlement during his presidency.

=== Attempted coups ===
In 1919, Meléndez suspended wages of the Salvadoran Army and the National Guard to address the Recession of 1920–1921 after end of World War I. Throughout Meléndez's presidency, army pay was frequently suspended, and when it was paid, it was not paid in full. The army also accused Meléndez of allocating army duties to the National Guard and making the gendarmerie more important than the army. In 1920, Meléndez proposed implementing reforms that would make the military accountable to civilian courts. Although he never went through with this proposal, the announcement strained government–military relations.

In March 1920, the Salvadoran government discovered a plot by Araujo to overthrow Meléndez, and subsequently, government forces clashed with Araujo's supporters at Araujo's El Sunza hacienda while attempting to arrest Araujo. Araujo fled El Salvador to Honduras, and in May 1920, he led an army of around 300 to 1,000 militiamen across the El Salvador–Honduras border. He captured the city of Arcatao, but Meléndez's soldiers forced Araujo back across the border. Araujo remained in exile until 1923. At the same time as Araujo's invasion, two army barracks mutinied but both were suppressed.

In February 1922, 63 cadets of the Polytechnic School attempted to overthrow Meléndez. They attacked loyalist soldiers in San Salvador resulting in around 50 casualties. The government suppressed the coup within one day and Meléndez shut down the Polytechnic School for four years. Another coup attempt occurred on 22 May 1922 when 200 soldiers of the 6th Infantry Barracks revolted and declared Oliverio Cromwell Valle, an exiled opponent of Meléndez, as president. They attempted to capture the El Zapote barracks but failed.

=== Central America union ===
El Salvador briefly joined the Federation of Central America consisting of El Salvador, Guatemala, and Honduras. In January 1921, El Salvador sent a delegation to San José, Costa Rica to negotiate the establishment of a new Central American union. They drafted the Pact of Union of Central America, and on 9 September 1921, El Salvador ratified the Central American constitution. The union collapsed in December 1921 after a coup d'état in Guatemala.

== Post-presidency and death ==
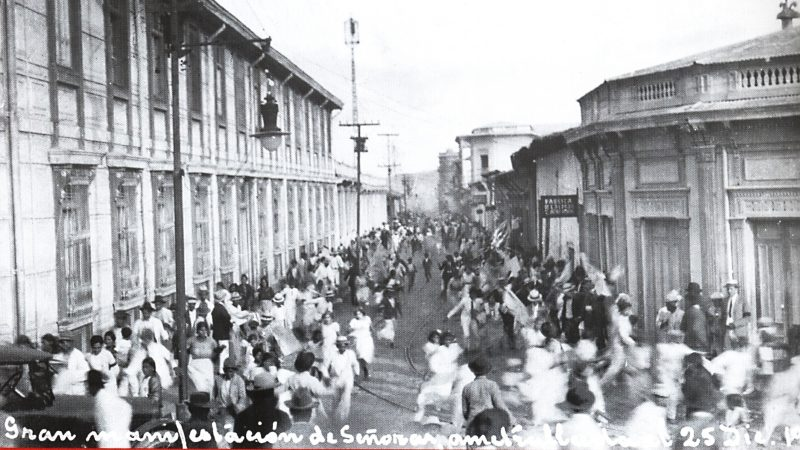
Rally attendants fleeing the scene of the Christmas Day Massacre perpetrated by Meléndez's Red League paramilitary

Meléndez left office on 1 March 1923 and was succeeded by Quiñónez who unanimously won the 1923 presidential election. His victory came after Meléndez banned political rallies and the Red League massacred dozens of Molina's supporters (who challenged Quiñónez) at a political rally on 25 December 1922. According to Montgomery Schuyler Jr., the United States ambassador to El Salvador, Meléndez offered a toast to the massacre in 1923. Meléndez never held public office after leaving the presidency.

In 1927, Quiñónez was succeeded as president by Romero. Quiñónez intended to continue ruling through Romero who would serve as a puppet ruler, but Romero sought to distance himself from the dynasty and forced several of Quiñónez's government officials to resign. He also lifted press censorship leading to protests against Quiñónez's occupation of the office of First Presidential Designate (second in line to the presidency after the vice president). Quiñónez left the country for exile in France, but he and Meléndez plotted a coup to overthrow Romero and preserve the dynasty's political influence.

Meléndez, the coup's primary organizer, recruited several allies to execute the coup and raised an army of 500 militiamen at his Valencia hacienda. On 7 December 1927, Colonel Juan Enrique Aberle and Major Manuel Alfaro Noguera (participants of the coup) told Chief of Police Colonel Enrique Leitzelar that a military junta proclaimed Aberle as the country's president, but Leitzelar demanded confirmation from General Carlos Carmona Tadey, the commander of the 1st Infantry Regiment. Carmona was supposed to be involved in the coup but denied any knowledge of such a junta existing. Aberle and Noguera surrendered but later told Romero that he had been overthrown and offered him safe passage out of El Salvador. Romero had Aberle and Noguera arrested and the coup collapsed. Meléndez never mobilized his militiamen and subsequently fled the country to Costa Rica after the United States embassy in San Salvador denied his asylum request. In Costa Rica, Meléndez invested in the sugar industry.

Meléndez died in San Salvador on 22 November 1953.

== Personal life ==
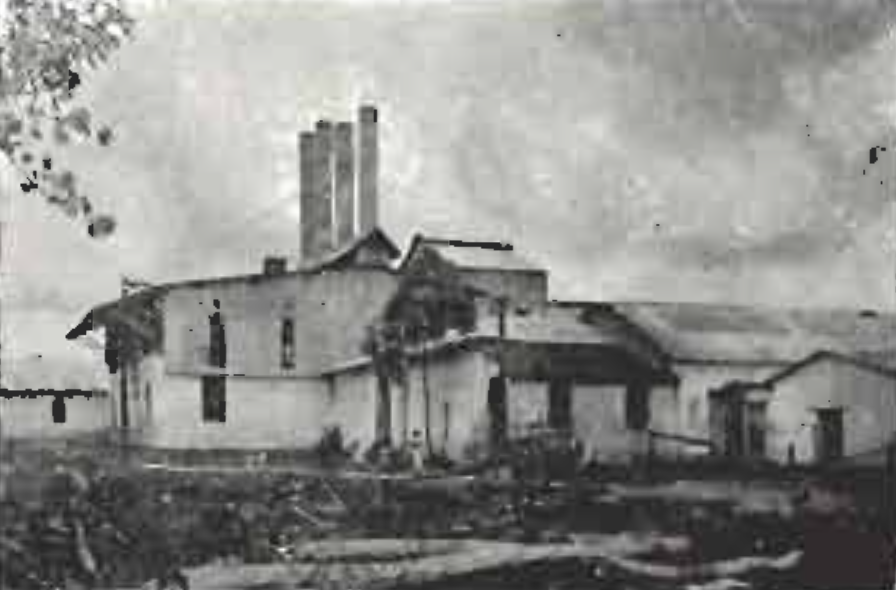
The Venecia sugar hacienda owned by Meléndez

Meléndez married Tula Mazzini and the couple had 3 children: Jorge, María de los Ángeles, and Ricardo.

Meléndez was an agriculturalist. He owned at least three haciendas named Prusia, Valencia, and Venecia; some raised cattle and others produced sugar. Meléndez and Carlos were El Salvador's largest sugar producers during the Meléndez–Quiñónez dynasty. According to a 1929 agricultural census, Meléndez owned over half of the land in the city of Soyapango. Meléndez also owned shares of the Central American Insurance Company and the Artesian Well Drilling Company of Salvador. American agronomist Frederick William Taylor described Meléndez as a "very wealthy man with all sorts of activities going on".

== Electoral history ==
Year	Office	Type	Party	Main opponent(s)	Party	Votes for Meléndez				Result	Swing	Ref.
Year	Office	Type	Party	Main opponent(s)	Party	Total	%	P.	±%	Result	Swing	Ref.
1919	President of El Salvador	General	PDN	Pío Romero Bosque	PDN	166,441	96.86	1st	N/A	Won	Hold	
1919	President of El Salvador	General	PDN	Manuel Enrique Araujo	PLS	166,441	96.86	1st	N/A	Won	Hold	

Political offices
Preceded by Alfonso Quiñónez Molina (provisional)	President of El Salvador; 1919–1923	Succeeded by Alfonso Quiñónez Molina
