= National Democratic Party (El Salvador) =

Salvadoran political party

National Democratic Party Partido Nacional Democrático
- Abbreviation: PND
- Founders: Alfonso Quiñónez Molina; Jorge Meléndez
- Founded: 1918
- Dissolved: 6 September 1927
- Preceded by: Club Melendista
- Headquarters: San Salvador, El Salvador
- Paramilitary wing: Red League (1918–1923)
- Ideology: Pragmatic liberalism

The National Democratic Party (Spanish: Partido Nacional Democrático, abbreviated PND), also known as the Club Quiñonista, was a Salvadoran political party that existed from 1918 to 1927. The party held power from 1918 to 1927 in the Meléndez–Quiñónez dynasty era of Salvadoran politics, during which the PND ruled as country's sole political party. The Red League was the paramilitary wing of the PND from 1918 to 1923.

The PND was founded by Alfonso Quiñónez Molina and Jorge Meléndez in 1918 when Quiñónez was running for president in the 1919 election. When Quiñónez became constitutionally ineligible to run after be became president weeks before the election, Jorge Meléndez replaced him as the PND's candidate. He won the election and served as president from 1919 to 1923. Quiñónez again ran for president in the 1923 election; he won and served from 1923 to 1927. Quiñónez was succeeded by Vice President Pío Romero Bosque who won the 1927 election unopposed. On 6 September 1927, Romero dissolved the PND as a part of his democratic reforms.

The PND functioned as a patronage network. The party's hierarchy had internal administrative bodies at the national, departmental, and municipal levels that were often led by government officials. Contrary to the PND's name, the party was not democratic.

== History ==
=== Establishment ===
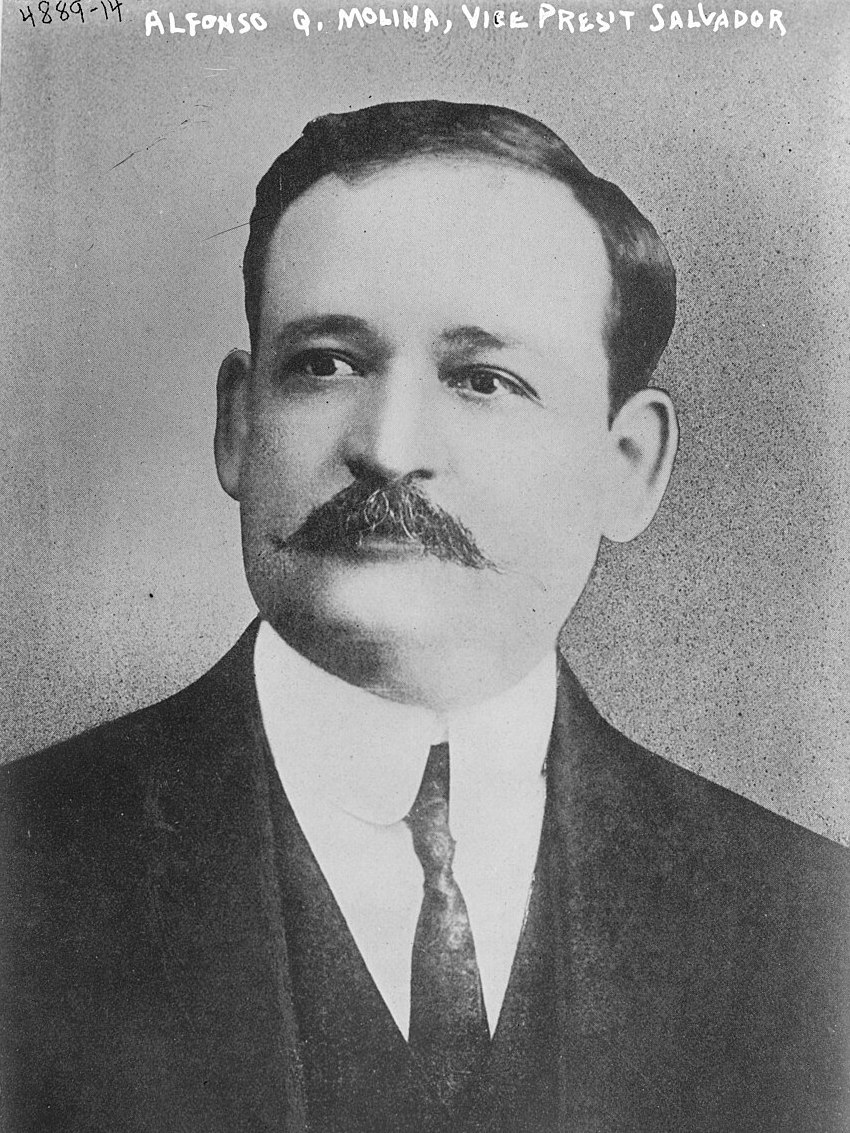
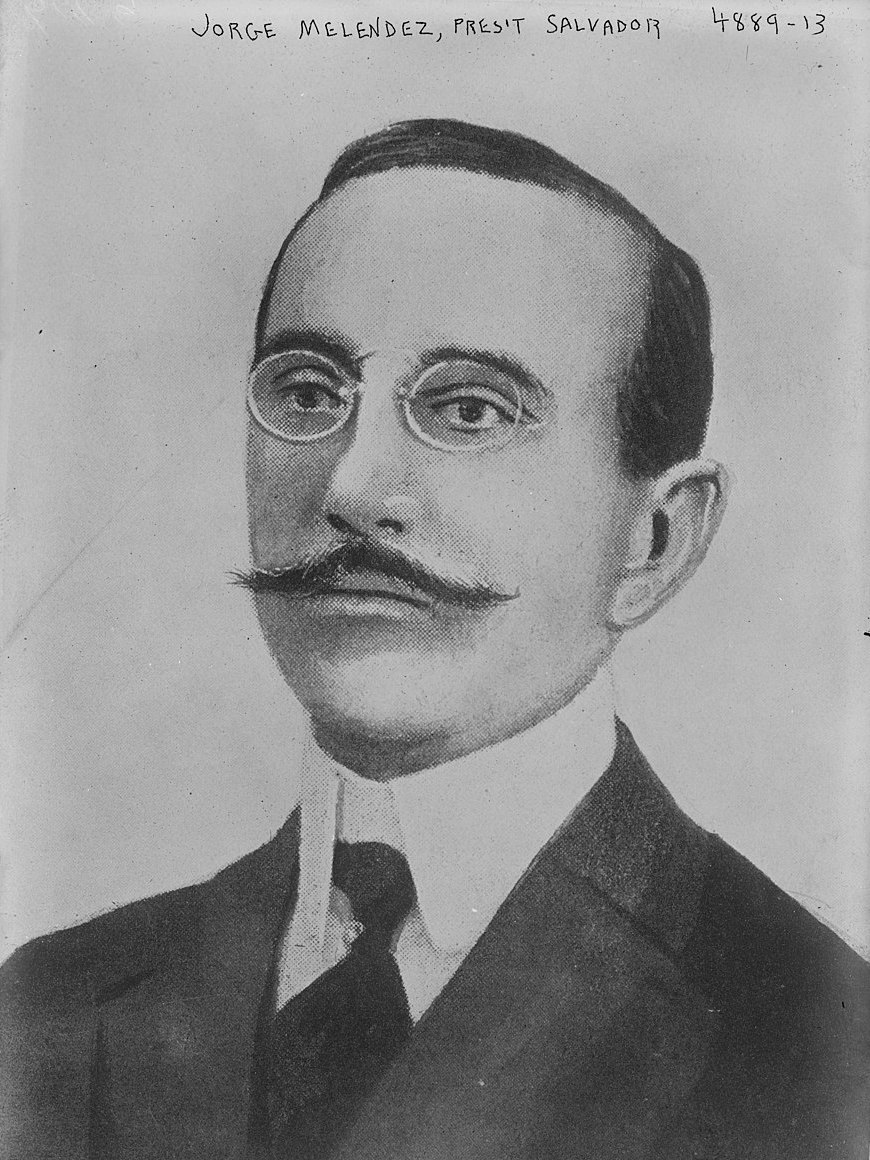
Alfonso Quiñónez Molina (left) and Jorge Meléndez (right), the founders of the National Democratic Party

The National Democratic Party was founded in 1918 by Vice President Alfonso Quiñónez Molina and Jorge Meléndez. They used the PND to consolidate their patronage networks across El Salvador and proceeded to ban political activity outside of the PND. The PND succeeded the Club Melendista, a pseudo-political party founded by Jorge Meléndez's brother and President of El Salvador, Carlos Meléndez. Together, the rule of Quiñónez and the Meléndez brothers is known as the Meléndez–Quiñónez dynasty.

=== 1919 presidential election ===
The PND was founded during Quiñónez's presidential campaign for the 1919 election. Quiñónez ran against Tomás García Palomo, the finance minister, as Carlos Meléndez did not choose his successor going against precedent at the time. Quiñónez also established the Red League as the PND's paramilitary wing. Both Quiñónez and Palomo sought to have allies win in the 1918 municipal elections so that they could monopolize polling stations for next months' presidential election; Quiñónez's allies won, effectively assuring him victory. On 21 December 1918, Carlos Meléndez resigned from the presidency due to illness and Quiñónez, as vice president, became president. Palomo dropped out after this as he did not want to run against the incumbent president, but Quiñónez was now constitutionally prohibited from running in the election as he was holding the presidency six months before the election.

One week before the election, Quiñónez selected Jorge Meléndez to replace him as the PND's presidential candidate. When Salvadoran Laborist Party leader Arturo Araujo announced his candidacy to challenge Jorge Meléndez, he and Quiñónez ordered Supreme Court president Pío Romero Bosque to also run so that they could humiliate Araujo. They instructed polling stations to count votes first for Jorge Meléndez, then for Romero, and the remaining votes for Araujo. Jorge Meléndez won with 166,441 votes; Romero finished in second with 4,370 votes; and Araujo finished in third with 1,022 votes.

After Jorge Meléndez became president, he and Quiñónez worked to further consolidate the PND's patronage network and eliminate factionalism. Fermín Velasco, a PND affiliate from Sensuntepeque, described "independent politicians" ("politicos independientes") as enemies, and Manuel Funes from Chinameca wrote that "it is necessary to stop all of their [political outsiders'] intrigues; the enemy always is the enemy".

=== 1923 and 1927 presidential elections ===
Quiñónez ran as the PND's presidential candidate in the 1923 election. Miguel Tomás Molina, Jorge Meléndez's interior minister and Quiñónez's cousin, was Quiñónez's primary opponent. After repressing Molina's campaign and carrying out a massacre of his supporters on 25 December 1922, Molina sought refuge in the Spanish embassy, leaving Quiñónez virtually unopposed. Quiñónez won the election with 178,000 votes, after which he dissolved the Red League for unclear reasons.

Ahead of the 1927 presidential election, Quiñónez considered amending the constitution of El Salvador to allow himself to seek re-election, but he abandoned this plan as he feared his government would not be recognized by the United States in accordance with the 1923 Central American Treaty of Peace and Amity. Quiñónez selected Romero, his vice president, to succeed him as the PND's presidential candidate. Romero won the election unanimously. According to US chargé d'affaires Jefferson Caffery, Romero "took an oath to support the [PND's] program", but once in office, Romero implemented democratic reforms and broke with the Meléndez–Quiñónez dynasty.

=== Dissolution ===
On 6 September 1927, Romero ordered the PND's dissolution as a part of his democratic reforms. He prohibited candidates in the December 1928 municipal elections from campaigning under the PND's name. While many former PND affiliates won municipal races, some politicians with no PND affiliations also won some seats. In the 1929 municipal election, less PND affiliates won municipal races. During the 1931 presidential election, former war minister Alberto Gómez Zárate was the presidential candidate whom was most closely affiliated with the PND and the Meléndez–Quiñónez dynasty; he lost to Araujo.

Araujo was overthrown in December 1931. His successor, Brigadier General Maximiliano Hernández Martínez, established the National Pro Patria Party (PNPP) in 1933. The PNPP functioned similarly to the PND as a party to consolidate Martínez's patronage network. Historian Erik Ching described the PNPP as "the heir to the PND", adding that "for all intents and purposes[, the PNPP] was the same institution that was operating under the name of the PND".

== Structure ==
The PND function as a nationwide patronage network and centralized hierarchy led by Quiñónez and Jorge Meléndez. A PND affiliate referred to Quiñónez as "our grand, noble and illustrious Jefe". The PND was officially headed by the National Committee. The National Committee oversaw PND committees at the department level, and the department committees oversaw municipal committees, known as clubs. Many government officials such as ministers, governors, and mayors served on these committees and clubs. Political candidates had to receive approval from the PND's clubs and committees in order to run. Ching described the PND as not being an actual political party due to its nature as a patronage network.

== Ideology ==
Ching described the PND as "contrary to its name, [...] [not] democratic". Its founders, Quiñónez and Jorge Meléndez, were both pragmatic liberals. The Red League was a populist organization that promoted socialist messaging.

== Electoral history ==
=== Presidential elections ===
Election	Candidate	Votes	%	Pos.	Result	Ref.
1919	Jorge Meléndez	166,441	96.86%	▲1st/2nd	Elected ✓	
1919	Pío Romero Bosque	4,370	2.54%	▲1st/2nd	Lost ✗	
1923	Alfonso Quiñónez Molina	178,000	100.00%	▲1st	Elected ✓	
1927	Pío Romero Bosque	?	100.00%	1st	Elected ✓	

=== Municipal elections ===
The PND participated in the municipal elections of 1918, 1919, 1920, 1921, 1923, and 1925.

== See also ==
- List of political parties in El Salvador
