= 1915 Salvadoran presidential election =

- 12 January 1915
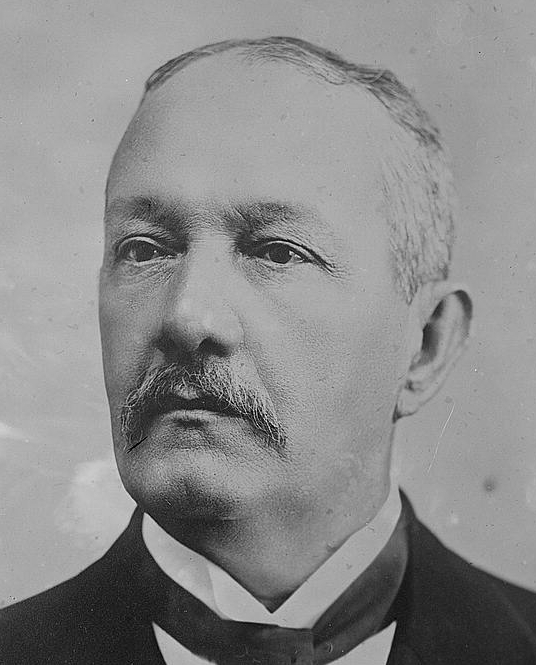
Nominee	Carlos Meléndez
Party	Club Melendista
Percentage	100%
President before election
Alfonso Quiñónez Molina
Club Melendista
Elected President
Carlos Meléndez
Club Melendista

Presidential elections were held in El Salvador on 12 January 1915. Carlos Meléndez was the only candidate and was elected unopposed.

== Results ==
Candidate	Party	Votes	%
Carlos Meléndez	Club Melendista		100
Total			
Source: Perez

== Bibliography ==
- Callardo, Ricardo Las constituciones de El Salvador I-II. Madrid: Ediciones Cultura Hispanica. 1961.
- Garcia, Miguel Angel Diccionario Histórico Enciclopédico de la República de El Salvador. Vol. II San Salvador 1928.
- Larde y Larín, Jorge Guía Histórica de El Salvador San Salvador: Ministerio de Culture. 1958.
- Vidal, Manuel Nociones de historia de Centro América San Salvador: Ministerio de Educación. Ninth edition. 1970.
- Webre, Stephen José Napoleón Duarte and the Christian Democratic Party in Salvadoran Politics 1960-1972 Baton Rouge: Louisiana State University Press. 1979.
