= 1923 Salvadoran presidential election =

- 14 January 1923
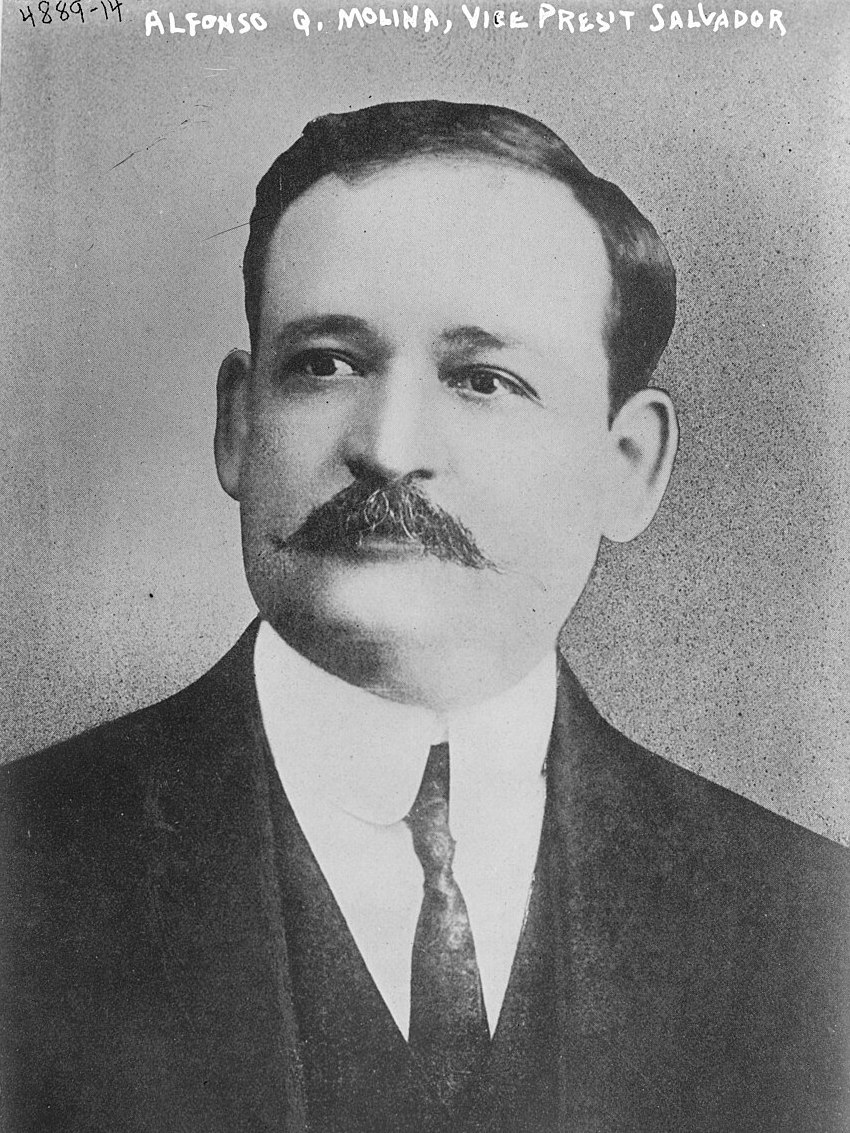
Nominee	Alfonso Quiñónez Molina
Party	National Democratic
Popular vote	c. 178,000
Percentage	100%
President before election
Jorge Meléndez
National Democratic
Elected President
Alfonso Quiñónez Molina
National Democratic

Presidential elections were held in El Salvador on 14 January 1923. The election was between Vice President Alfonso Quiñónez Molina and Miguel Tomás Molina, a former government minister and Quiñónez's cousin. On 25 December 1922, Salvadoran security forces massacred Molina's supporters at a political rally in San Salvador. Molina subsequently fled the country and called on his supporters to boycott the election, but Quiñónez won the election unanimously with 178,000 votes.

== Results ==
Candidate	Party	Votes	%
Alfonso Quiñónez Molina	National Democratic Party	178,000	100.00
Total		178,000	100.00
Source: Ching 1997, p. 280
