= 1927 Salvadoran presidential election =

- 9 January 1927
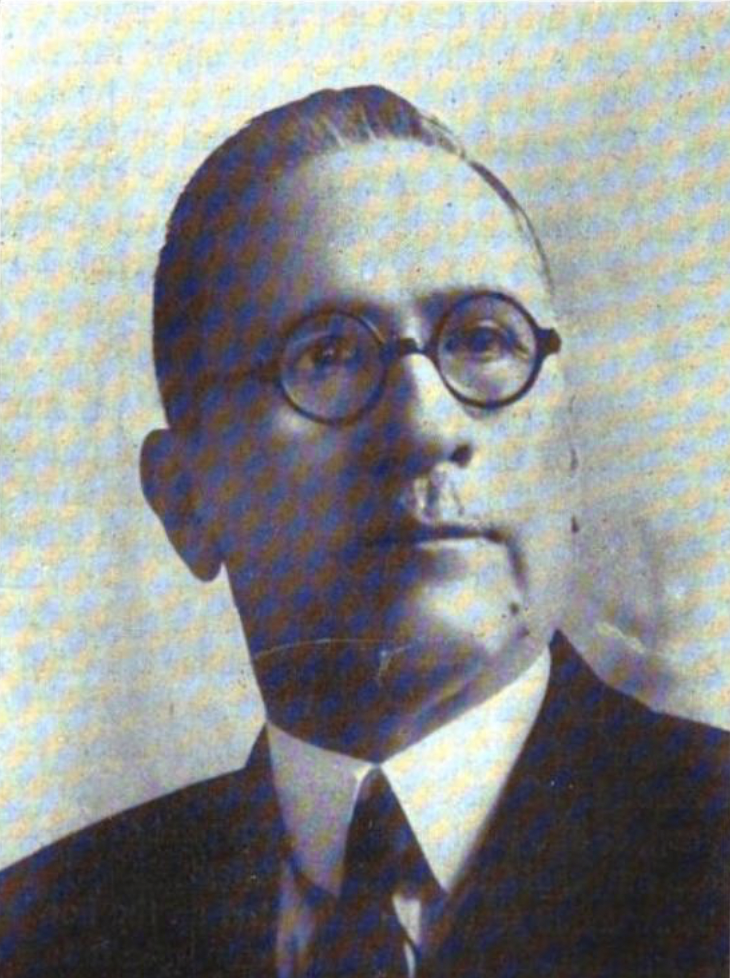
Nominee	Pío Romero Bosque
Party	National Democratic
Popular vote	192,860
Percentage	100%
President before election
Alfonso Quiñónez Molina
National Democratic
Elected President
Pío Romero Bosque
National Democratic

Presidential elections were held in El Salvador on 9 January 1927. Pío Romero Bosque was the only candidate and was elected unopposed.

== Results ==
Candidate	Party	Votes	%
Pío Romero Bosque	National Democratic Party	192,860	100.00
Total		192,860	100.00
Source: La Vanguardia

== Bibliography ==
- Alvarenga Venutolo, Patricia (1996) Cultura y etica de la violencia San José: EDUCA
- Callardo, Ricardo (1961) Las constituciones de El Salvador. I-II Madrid: Ediciones Cultura Hispanica
- Vidal, Manuel (1970) Nociones de historia de Centro América San Salvador: Ministerio de Educación. Ninth edition
- Webre, Stephen (1979) José Napoleón Duarte and the Christian Democratic Party in Salvadoran Politics 1960-1972 Baton Rouge: Louisiana State University Press
