= Carlos Meléndez (politician) =

President of El Salvador (1913–1914; 1915–1918)

His Excellency Carlos Meléndez
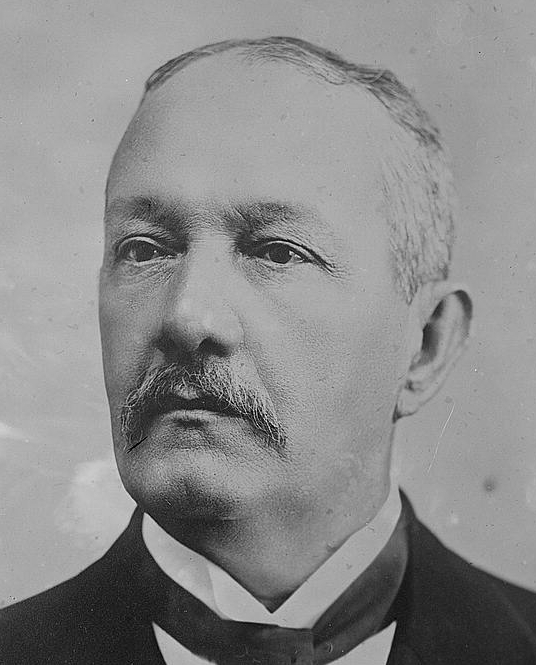
- Meléndez in 1915

22nd President of El Salvador
- In office 1 March 1915 – 21 December 1918
- Vice President: Alfonso Quiñónez Molina
- Preceded by: Alfonso Quiñónez Molina (provisional)
- Succeeded by: Alfonso Quiñónez Molina (provisional)
- In office 9 February 1913 – 29 August 1914; Provisional President
- Preceded by: Manuel Enrique Araujo
- Succeeded by: Alfonso Quiñónez Molina (provisional)
Other offices
137th President of the Legislative Assembly of El Salvador
In office 1 February 1913 – 1913
Preceded by	Rafael Pinto Figueroa
Succeeded by	Francisco García de Machón
Deputy of the Legislative Assembly of El Salvador from San Salvador
In office 1904, 1907–1908, 1912–1913

Personal details
- Born: Carlos Meléndez Ramírez; 1 February 1861 San Salvador, El Salvador
- Died: 8 October 1919 (aged 58) New York City, U.S.
- Party: Club Melendista (from 1913); Liberal (until 1913)
- Spouse: Sara Meza de Meléndez
- Relatives: Norberto Ramírez (grandfather); Jorge Meléndez (brother); Alfonso Quiñónez Molina (brother-in-law)
- Occupation: Politician, businessman

Carlos Meléndez Ramírez (1 February 1861 – 8 October 1919) was a Salvadoran politician and businessman who served as the 22nd president of El Salvador from 1913 to 1914 and again from 1915 to 1918. Meléndez's presidencies were a part of the broader Meléndez–Quiñónez dynasty that ruled El Salvador from 1913 to 1927.

Meléndez entered politics during the presidency of Divisional General Francisco Menéndez. He participated in the presidential elections of 1895, 1903, and 1907, but lost every contest. He was elected to the Legislative Assembly of El Salvador on five occasions during the 1900s and 1910s and became its president in 1913. That year, President Manuel Enrique Araujo was assassinated and Meléndez succeeded him as provisional president. He resigned in August 1914 to be eligible to run in the 1915 presidential election, which he won.

Meléndez was inaugurated as president on 1 March 1915. As president, Meléndez kept El Salvador neutral during World War I, in part due to his opposition to the United States' foreign policy in Nicaragua. Meléndez also promoted the "Meléndez Doctrine" that recognized the Gulf of Fonseca as a condominium between El Salvador, Honduras, and Nicaragua. He resigned from the presidency in August 1918 due to illness and was succeeded by his brother-in-law Vice President Alfonso Quiñónez Molina. Meléndez's brother, Jorge, succeeded Quiñónez after winning the 1919 election. Meléndez died in New York City in October 1919 and was buried in El Salvador the following month.

== Early and personal life ==
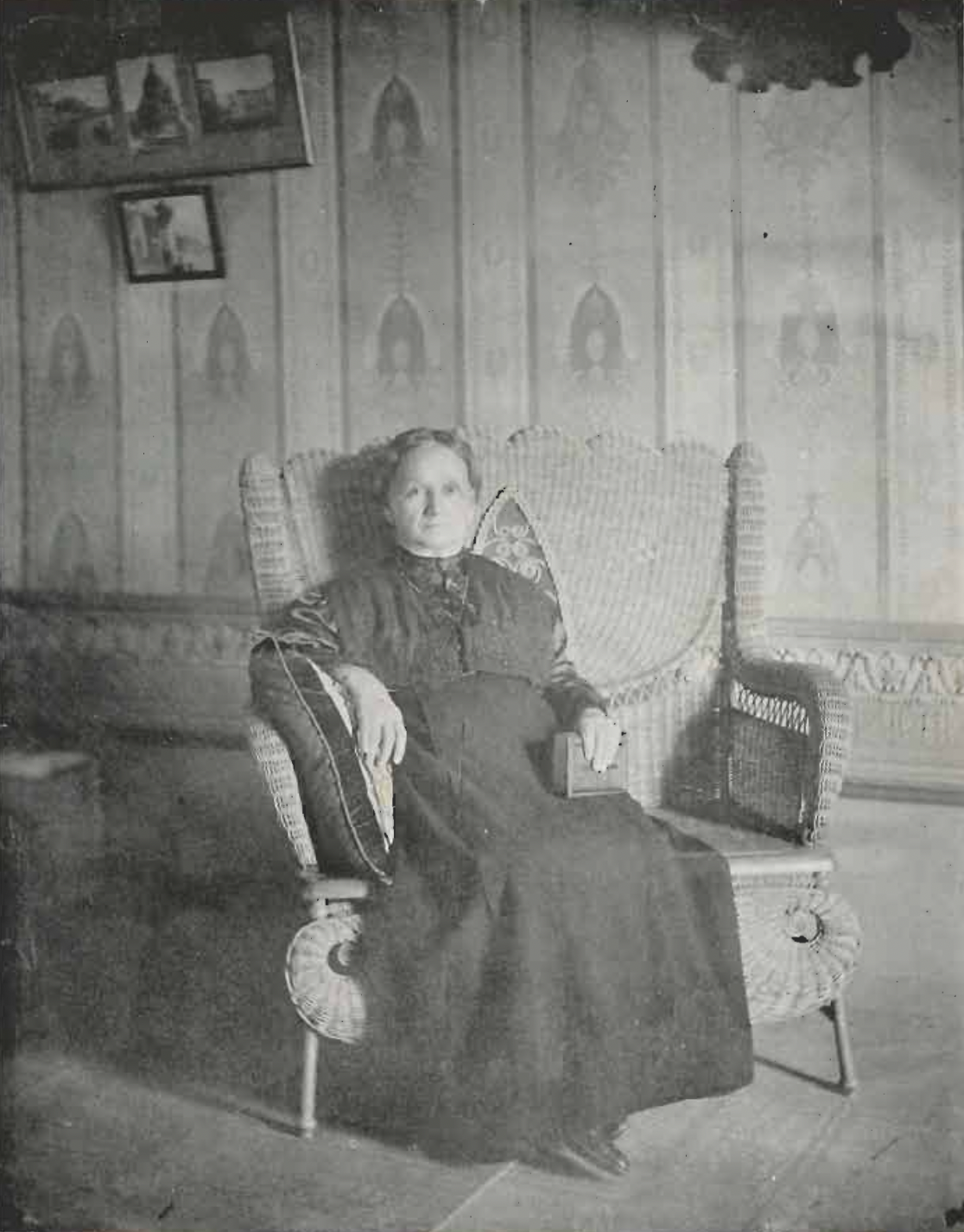
Meléndez's mother Mercedes Ramírez de Meléndez

Carlos Meléndez Ramírez was born on 1 February 1861 in San Salvador, El Salvador. His parents were Rafael Meléndez, a tailor, and Mercedes Ramírez de Meléndez. Meléndez's maternal grandfather was Norberto Ramírez, the head of state of El Salvador from 1840 to 1841. Meléndez was the couple's eldest child; he had seven younger siblings, including Jorge and Leonor. Alfonso Quiñónez Molina was Meléndez's brother-in-law through his marriage to Leonor. Meléndez's mother raised him as a Christian.

Meléndez attended a school led by Spanish professor Fernando Velarde. Meléndez became the head of his family when his father died on 11 January 1880. Meléndez made frequent business visits to the United States. He established an iron foundry in El Salvador named the Mercedes Iron Works after his mother. Meléndez also owned several coffee and sugar plantations including Carlos Meléndez y Hermanos which could produce up to 100,000 quintals of sugar per year. Meléndez married Sara Meza de Meléndez, but the couple did not have children.

== Early political career ==
Meléndez was a pragmatic liberal. During the presidency of Divisional General Francisco Menéndez, Meléndez volunteered to travel to London as a government representative to negotiate the procurement of a £300,000 (equivalent to $34,105,230 in 2025) loan. He refused payment for his participation in negotiations, instead deferring it to fund the construction of Hospital Rosales. In 1889, Meléndez was selected to be the governor of El Salvador as a part of the proposed Republic of Central America, but the union between El Salvador, Honduras, and Nicaragua did not materialize.

Meléndez participated in the 1894 Revolution of the 44 that overthrew President General Carlos Ezeta. He was a candidate for the 1895 election where he sought to be elected as General Rafael Antonio Gutiérrez's vice president. During the election, Meléndez and his primary opponent, Prudencio Alfaro, attempted to install allies in polling stations to monopolize them and tabulate votes in their favor. Meléndez finished in second with 18,792 votes, behind Alfaro's 38,006 votes. At the 1903 election, he ran as both a presidential and vice presidential candidate. He lost both elections to Pedro José Escalón (where his vote total is unknown, but it was no more than 191) and Calixto Velado (where he won 138 votes), respectively. Meléndez ran in the 1907 presidential election where he won 8 votes; Divisional General Fernando Figueroa won the election.

Meléndez was elected as a deputy of the Legislative Assembly of El Salvador in 1904 from the San Salvador Department. He was a part of the Finance and Public Credit Commission. He served again in 1907, 1908, 1912, and 1913. In the latter term, he was elected as the president of the Legislative Assembly, assuming office on 1 February.

== Presidency ==
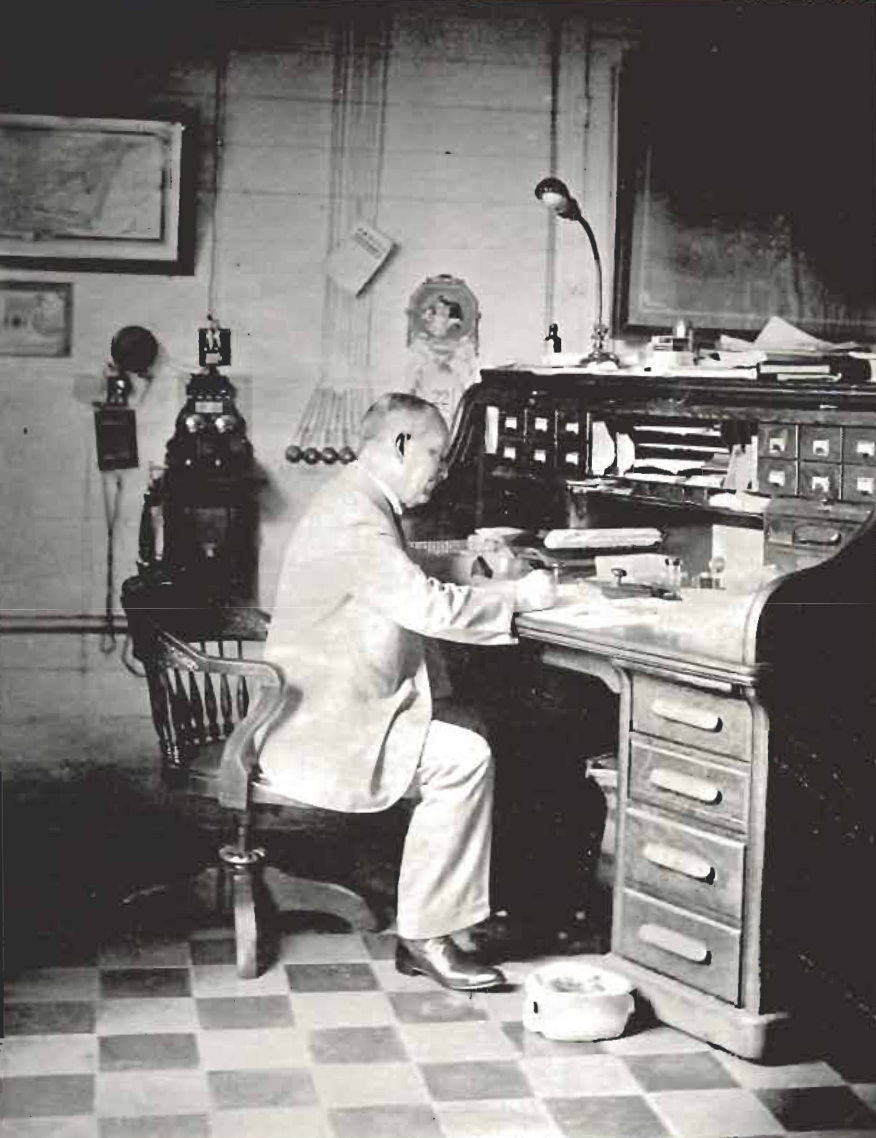
Meléndez in c. 1915–1916

On 4 February 1913, President Manuel Enrique Araujo was severely injured during an assassination attempt. He died a few days later on 9 February. As Vice President Onofre Durán had earlier resigned, the presidency passed to Meléndez as he was the first presidential designate. Meléndez's rise to the presidency marks the beginning of the Meléndez–Quiñónez dynasty, a political dynasty that ruled El Salvador from 1913 to 1927. Meléndez proclaimed 29 August as a national holiday to commemorate former president Captain General Gerardo Barrios and established the Medal to Military Merit. Also in 1913, Meléndez founded the Club Melendista proto-political party to help him solidify his control over the Salvadoran government.

Meléndez planned to run in the 1915 presidential election, but the constitution of El Salvador prohibited anyone holding the presidency six months before an election from being a candidate in that election. To bypass this constitutional limitation, Meléndez resigned on 29 August 1914 and was succeeded by Quiñónez, the first presidential designate.

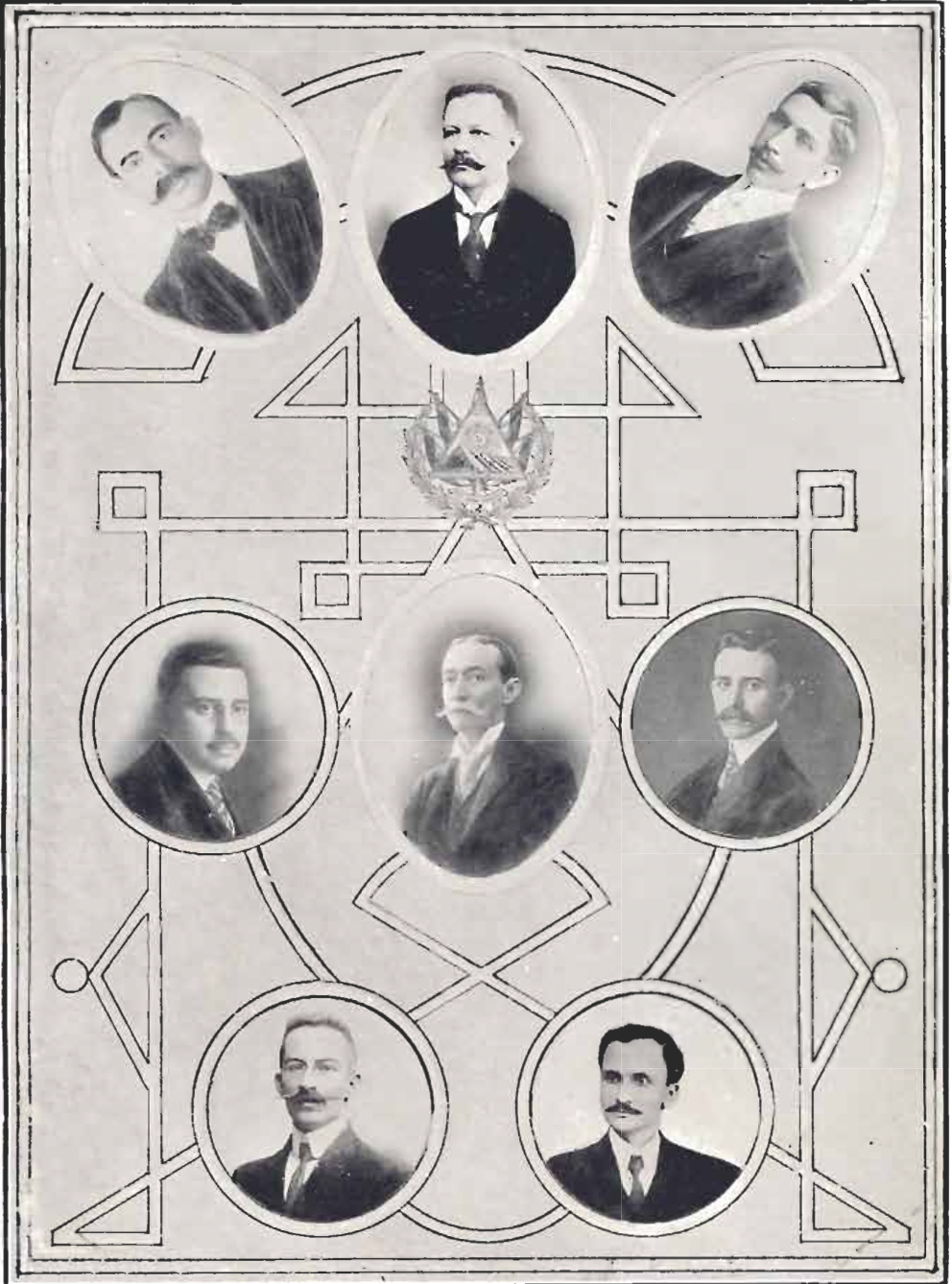
Meléndez's cabinet in 1916

Meléndez won the 1915 election and he was inaugurated on 1 March 1915. He appointed a cabinet consisting of Brigadier General Luis Alonso Barahona as Minister of War and the Navy; Cecilio Bustamante as Minister of Government, Promotion, and Agriculture; Tomás García Palomo as Minister of Finance, Public Credit, and Charity; and Francisco Martínez Suárez as Minister of Exterior Relations, Public Instruction, and Justice. He also appointed 4 sub-secretaries (vice ministers). Barahona died on 20 October 1915 and was succeeded by Enrique Córdova. Quiñónez was elected as Meléndez's vice president.

Meléndez opposed the 1914 Bryan–Chamorro Treaty between Nicaragua and the United States, viewing it as an infringement of Nicaragua's sovereignty. He also opposed the United States' proposal to build a naval base in the Gulf of Fonseca, as he considered the body of water to be a condominium shared by El Salvador, Honduras, and Nicaragua. In the "Meléndez Doctrine", he promoted the idea that the Gulf of Fonseca was a "territorial bay" ("bahía territorial") shared between the three countries. El Salvador remained neutral during World War I, but according to Salvadoran diplomat Rafael Guirola Duke, Meléndez sympathized with the Central Powers due to his opposition to the United States.

Against precedent from previous Salvadoran elections, Meléndez did not choose a presidential successor ahead of the 1919 presidential election. According to Córdova, Meléndez was unable to choose a successor between Quiñónez and Palomo (who was also Meléndez's personal physician). This led to Quiñónez and Palomo fighting to monopolize polling stations during the 1918 municipal elections to guarantee their victory in the 1919 presidential election. Quiñónez's allies won the municipal elections, effectively guaranteeing his presidential victory.

== Illness, resignation, and death ==
On 11 December 1918, Meléndez was afflicted by an "attack of paralysis", which historian Erik Ching believes to have been a heart attack or a stroke, and he suffered a second three days later. On 21 December, during a period of recovery, Meléndez resigned from the presidency. Quiñónez succeeded him, thus becoming disqualified from the 1919 presidential election. Quiñónez selected Meléndez's brother, Jorge, to replace him in the election; Jorge won and served as president from 1919 to 1923, after which, he was succeeded by Quiñónez.

In August 1919, Meléndez left El Salvador to the United States to seek treatment for his illness. He died from his illness in New York City on 8 October 1919. His funeral was held the two days later at St. Patrick's Cathedral. His body was returned to El Salvador on the USS Cleveland protected cruiser, arriving in La Libertad on 5 November 1919. He was buried in the General Cemetery. Meléndez was known as the "Business President".

== Electoral history ==
Year	Office	Type	Party	Main opponent	Party	Votes for Meléndez				Result	Swing	Ref.
Year	Office	Type	Party	Main opponent	Party	Total	%	P.	±%	Result	Swing	Ref.
1895	Vice President of El Salvador	General	Liberal	Prudencio Alfaro	Liberal	18,792	30.91	2nd	N/A	Lost	Hold	
1903	President of El Salvador	General	Liberal	Pedro José Escalón	Liberal	<191	Unknown			Lost	Hold	
1903	Vice President of El Salvador	General	Liberal	Calixto Velado	Liberal	138	0.12	9th	–30.79	Lost	Hold	
1907	President of El Salvador	General	Liberal	Fernando Figueroa	Liberal	8	0.01	6th	?	Lost	Hold	
1915	President of El Salvador	General	Club Melendista	Unopposed		?	100.00	1st	+99.99	Won	Gain	

Political offices
Preceded by Rafael Pinto Figueroa	President of the Legislative Assembly of El Salvador; 1913	Succeeded by Francisco García de Machón
Preceded by Manuel Enrique Araujo	President of El Salvador (provisional); 1913–1914	Succeeded by Alfonso Quiñónez Molina (provisional)
Preceded by Alfonso Quiñónez Molina (provisional)	President of El Salvador; 1915–1918	Succeeded by Alfonso Quiñónez Molina (provisional)
