= Salvador López Rochac =

Salvadoran politician

Colonel Salvador López Rochac

29th Minister of War, the Navy, and Aviation of El Salvador
- In office 1 December 1931 – 2 December 1931
- President: Arturo Araujo
- Preceded by: Maximiliano Hernández Martínez
- Succeeded by: Osmín Aguirre y Salinas

Supplement Deputy of the Legislative Assembly of El Salvador from Sonsonate
- In office 1 March 1931 – 2 December 1931

Personal details
- Party: Salvadoran Laborist Party
- Relatives: Arturo Araujo (brother-in-law)
- Occupation: Politician

Military service
- Allegiance: El Salvador
- Rank: Colonel

Salvador López Rochac was a Salvadoran politician and military officer. He served as a supplement deputy of the Legislative Assembly of El Salvador in 1931 and as the minister of war, the navy, and aviation for one day in December 1931 before being overthrown in a coup d'état.

== Political career ==
López was elected as a supplementary deputy of the Legislative Assembly from Sonsonate during the 1931 legislative election. He assumed office on 1 March 1931, and on 20 March, he was elected as the first presidential designate — the individual who would assume the presidency of El Salvador in the event of a vacancy. Salvadoran president Arturo Araujo (López's brother-in-law) also appointed López as the General Director of the Police. According to Leopoldo Ovidio Rodríguez, a writer for the Opinión Estudiantil newspaper, López's appointment was illegal due to article 63 of the constitution of El Salvador prohibiting incumbent deputies of the Legislative Assembly from holding any other office with the exception of diplomatic offices.

On 1 December 1931, Araujo removed Brigadier General Maximiliano Hernández Martínez from his position as minister of war, the navy, and aviation (defense minister) due to him questioning Martínez's loyalty to his government. Araujo appointed López to the position to replace Martínez. The following day, the Armed Forces of El Salvador launched a coup d'état against Araujo. The military established the Civic Directory to rule El Salvador and replaced López as defense minister with Colonel Osmín Aguirre y Salinas. Although López was the first presidential designate, he did not assume the presidency as he fled El Salvador along with Araujo. Doctor José Maximiliano Olano, the president of the Legislative Assembly and the second designate, would have assumed office, but the Civic Directory did not permit him to; instead, it appointed Martínez as provisional president on 4 December 1931.

Political offices
Preceded by Maximiliano Hernández Martínez	Minister of War, the Navy, and Aviation of El Salvador; 1931	Succeeded by Osmín Aguirre y Salinas
