= Jorge Molina =

Jorge Molina may refer to:

- Jorge Molina (footballer, born 1982), Spanish footballer
- Jorge Molina (footballer, born 1988), Peruvian footballer
- Jorge Molina Enríquez (born 1966), Cuban film director
- Jorge Molina (comics) (born 1984), Mexican comic artist
- Jorge Molina (rower) (born 1956), Argentine Olympic rower
- Jorge Molina (sport shooter) (born 1956), Colombian sports shooter
- Jorge Alberto Molina (born 1956), Salvadoran military officer and Minister of National Defense of El Salvador
- Jorge Molina (artist), Spanish-Canadian artist, actor and filmmaker
