= Military Museum of the Armed Forces of El Salvador =

Museum in El Salvador

- Museo Militar de la Fuerza Armada de El Salvador
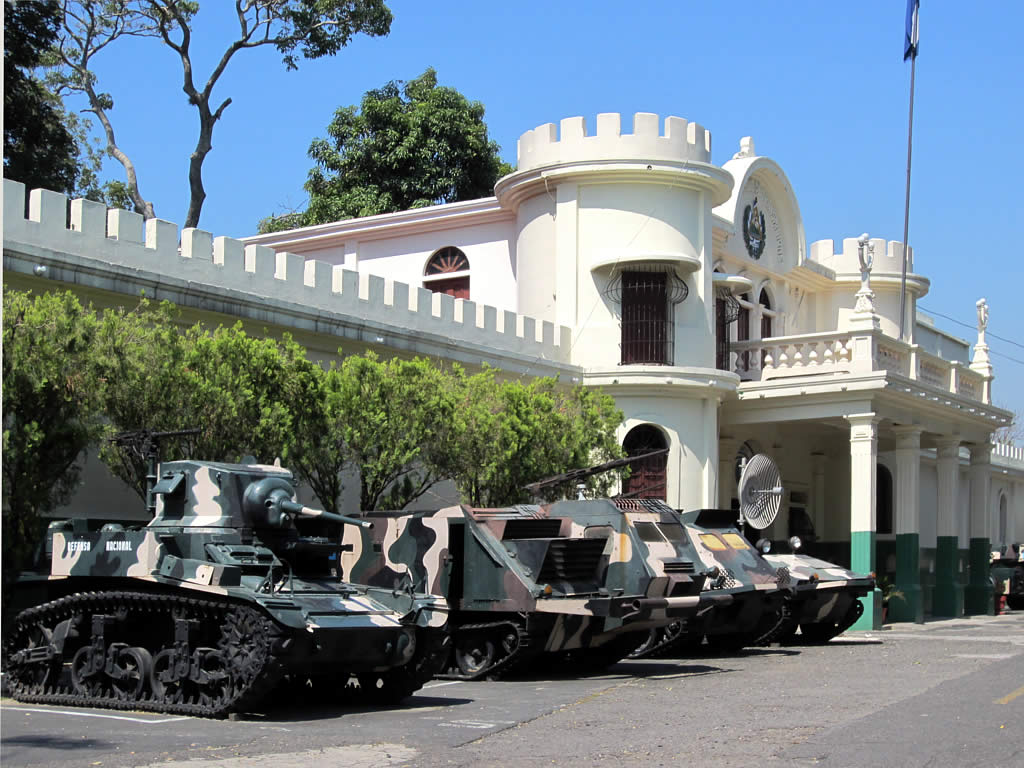
- The front of the military museum
- Former name: El Zapote barracks
- Established: 1898 (initial structure); 1918 (as barracks); 16 June 1993 (as a museum)
- Location: San Salvador, El Salvador
- Coordinates: 13°40′53″N 89°11′34″W
- Type: Military museum Barracks (former)
- Architect: Borromeo Flores
- Owner: Ministry of National Defense

The Military Museum of the Armed Forces of El Salvador (Spanish: Museo Militar de la Fuerza Armada de El Salvador) is located in San Salvador, El Salvador. The museum is housed inside the former El Zapote barracks (cuartel El Zapote) of the Salvadoran Army. The museum is owned by the Ministry of National Defense.

== History ==
In 1898, the Salvadoran Army selected a hill in San Salvador to begin construction of a metal galley, and later a wooden structure, to house soldiers of the Legion of Freedom. In 1918, the army commissioned architect Borromeo Flores to construct barracks for the soldiers. Sapote trees grew on the hill the barracks were built on, and it was subsequently named "El Zapote". During the barracks' usage by the army, it served as the operational headquarters for the 1st Artillery Regiment and later the Armed Forces Transmission Support Command.

On 16 June 1993, the Salvadoran president Alfredo Cristiani and minister of national defense René Emilio Ponce issued Decree Number 65 which transformed the El Zapote barracks into a military museum under the administration of the Ministry of National Defense. The museum opened to the public on 6 September 2002. On 7 January 2003, the remains of Manuel José Arce, a Salvadoran politician who served as the first president of the Federal Republic of Central America from 1825 to 1829, were interred at the military museum.

== Displays ==
The museum has several vehicles, aircraft, and up to 35,000 pieces of military equipment — including uniforms, documents, photographs, paintings, insignia patches, statues, and flags — on display. The popemobile used by Pope John Paul II during his 1996 visit to El Salvador and a 1:25000-scale relief map of El Salvador are also on display at the museum. The Memorial Plaza of National Sovereignty and the Commemorative Monument of the Salvadoran Leaders of Central American Independence are located at the military museum. These objects are displayed across several exhibition rooms covering certain periods of Salvadoran military history. The museum initially opened with twelve display rooms, but this was later reduced to ten and several were renamed.

The museum is located at the intersection of 10 Avenida Sur and Calle Alberto Sánchez in the San Jacinto neighborhood of San Salvador. It is located adjacent to the former presidential palace of El Salvador used until 2001. The museum's mission is to "Preserve, Research, and disseminate the historical and cultural heritage of the Armed Forces of El Salvador" ("Conservar, Investigar y difundir el patrimonio histórico cultural de la Fuerza Armada de El Salvador") The museum is open year-round and admission is free.

== See also ==
- List of museums in El Salvador
