= Antonio Claramount Lucero =

Salvadoran military officer

General Antonio Claramount Lucero
- Born: 13 June 1886
- Died: 25 June 1975 (aged 89)
- Spouse: Blanca Rozeville
- Children: Ernesto
- Military career
- Allegiance: El Salvador
- Branch: Salvadoran Army
- Service years: 1903–?
- Rank: General
- Commands: Salvadoran Air Fleet

Antonio Claramount Lucero (13 June 1886 – 25 July 1975) was a Salvadoran military officer who commanded the Salvadoran Air Fleet from 1927 to 1929.

== Biography ==
Antonio Claramount Lucero was born on 13 June 1886. He attended the Military Polytechnic School from 1901 to 1903, after which, he became a sub-lieutenant in the Salvadoran Army. He was promoted to lieutenant in 1906; captain in 1908; major captain on 27 September 1911; lieutenant colonel on 27 July 1916; and colonel on 24 June 1920.

Claramount became the commander of the Salvadoran Air Fleet on 7 December 1927 after the previous commander, General Carlos Carmona Tadey, was fired for his involvement in the 1927 Salvadoran coup attempt. Claramount held this position until 15 May 1929. On 10 March 1928, he was promoted to general. On 28 May 1931, Claramount resigned as the military commander of the Usulután Department to run in the 1931 Salvadoran presidential election as the Progressive Fraternal Party's presidential candidate. Claramount was an "extreme conservative" candidate. Claramount finished in fourth place with 18,399 votes. Claramount claimed there was fraud and called for coup, but this did not materialize. Claramount was forced into exile by Brigadier General Maximiliano Hernández Martínez under the guise of launching a "communist sedition" after Claramount's supporters attempted to challenge Martínez in the 1935 presidential election.

Claramount boycotted the 1945 presidential election in which he only won 165 votes and finished in third behind Colonel Osmín Aguirre y Salinas and winner General Salvador Castaneda Castro. Claramount died on 25 July 1975.

== Dates of ranks ==
The following is a list of Claramount's military ranks during his career.

Insignia	Rank	Service branch	Date of promotion
Sub-lieutenant	Sub-lieutenant	Army	1903
Lieutenant	Lieutenant	Army	1906
Captain	Captain	Army	1908
Major captain	Major captain	Army	27 September 1911
Lieutenant colonel	Lieutenant colonel	Army	27 July 1916
Colonel	Colonel	Army	24 June 1920
General	General	Army	10 March 1928

== Electoral history ==
The following table is a summary of Claramount's electoral history.

Year	Office	Type	Party	Main opponent	Party	Votes for Claramount				Result	Swing	Ref.
Year	Office	Type	Party	Main opponent	Party	Total	%	P.	±%	Result	Swing	Ref.
1931	President of El Salvador	General	PFP	Arturo Araujo	PLS	18,399	8.04	4th	N/A	Lost	Gain	
1945	President of El Salvador	General	PFP	Salvador Castaneda Castro	PUDS	165	0.05	3rd	–7.99	Lost	Gain	

Military offices
Preceded by Carlos Carmona Tadey	Commander of the Salvadoran Air Fleet; 1927–1929	Succeeded by José Trabanino
