= Alberto Gómez Zárate =

Minister of National Defense of El Salvador (1927–1930)

Doctor Alberto Gómez Zárate
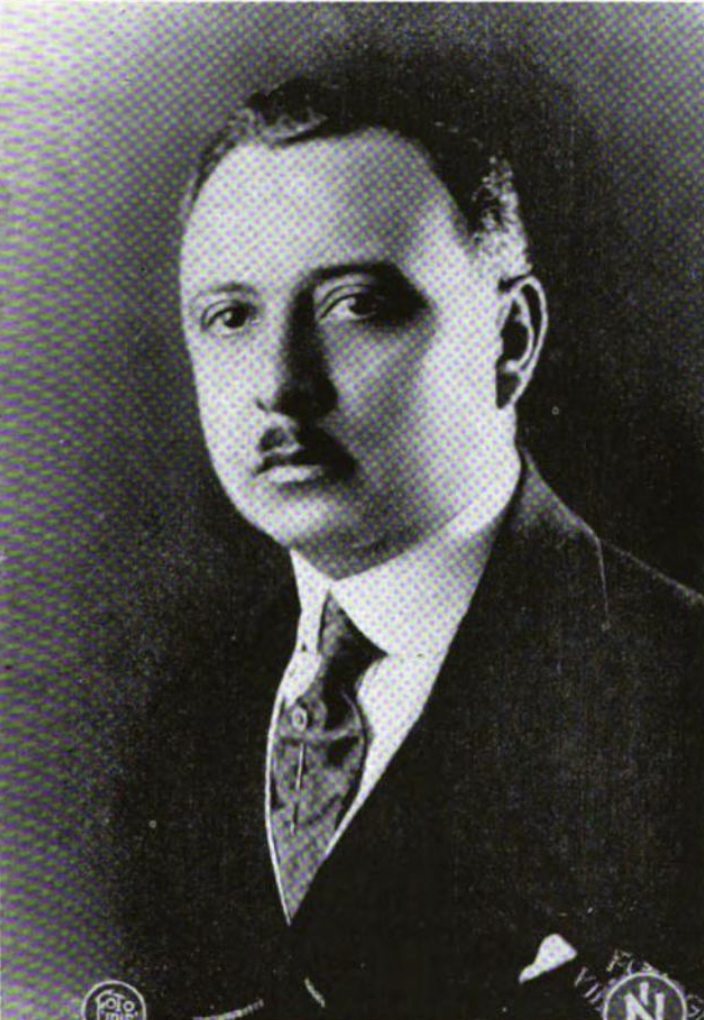
- Zárate in c. 1923–1925

24th Minister of War, the Navy, and Aviation of El Salvador
- In office 1 March 1927 – 19 May 1930
- President: Pío Romero Bosque
- Preceded by: Pío Romero Bosque
- Succeeded by: Pío Romero Bosque Molina

5th Attorney General of El Salvador
- In office May 1945 – 14 December 1948
- President: Salvador Castaneda Castro
- Preceded by: Manuel Humberto Rivera
- Succeeded by: Julio Eduardo Jiménez Castillo

45th President of the Supreme Court of Justice of El Salvador
- In office 1932 – May 1944
- Preceded by: Manuel Vicente Mendoza
- Succeeded by: Miguel Tomás Molina

Personal details
- Born: 23 February 1883 San Salvador, El Salvador
- Died: 19 August 1967 (aged 84) San Salvador, El Salvador
- Party: National Democratic Party (until 1927); Independent (1927–1931); Patriotic Action Party (1931)
- Occupation: Politician, lawyer

Alberto Gómez Zárate (23 February 1883 – 19 August 1967) was a Salvadoran politician and lawyer who served as Minister of War, the Navy, and Aviation of El Salvador under President Pío Romero Bosque from 1927 to 1930. He was also a candidate for president in the 1931 presidential election as a member of the Patriotic Action Party (PAP). Zárate's candidacy had the support of the military, but he eventually lost the election to Arturo Araujo.

Zárate owned a law firm in San Salvador. From 1910 to 1912, Zárate served as a substitute deputy of the Legislative Assembly of El Salvador from the San Salvador Department. From 1923 to 1927, Zárate served as the sub-secretary of war, the navy, and aviation under President Alfonso Quiñónez Molina and Minister of War Romero. From 1939 to 1941, Zárate was the country's second presidential designate; from 1942 to 1943, he was the first presidential designate. Zárate served as the president of the Supreme Court of Justice of El Salvador from 1932 until his resignation in May 1944 following the Strike of Fallen Arms and the resignation of President Maximiliano Hernández Martínez. In May 1945, he became the country's attorney general and served until December 1948.

== Electoral history ==
Year	Office	Type	Party	Main opponent	Party	Votes for Zárate				Result	Swing	Ref.
Year	Office	Type	Party	Main opponent	Party	Total	%	P.	±%	Result	Swing	Ref.
1931	President of El Salvador	General	PAP	Arturo Araujo	PLS	64,280	28.09	2nd	N/A	Runoff		
1931	President of El Salvador	Indirect	PAP	Arturo Araujo	PLS	0	0.00	T-2nd	N/A	Lost	Gain	

Political offices
Preceded by Pío Romero Bosque	Minister of War, the Navy, and Aviation of El Salvador; 1927–1930	Succeeded by Pío Romero Bosque Molina
Preceded by Manuel Vicente Mendoza	President of the Supreme Court of Justice of El Salvador; 1942–1944	Succeeded by Miguel Tomás Molina
Preceded by Manuel Humberto Rivera	Attorney General of El Salvador; 1945–1948	Succeeded by Julio Eduardo Jiménez Castillo
