= Agustín García =

Agustín García may refer to:

- Agus (footballer) (born 1985), Spanish footballer
- Agustín García (skier) (born 1980), Argentine alpine skier
- Agustín García Calderón, president of the Supreme Court of El Salvador
- Agustín García Calvo (1926–2012), Spanish philologist, philosopher, poet and playwright
- Agustín García Basso (born 1992), Argentine footballer
