= Minister of National Defense (El Salvador) =

Salvadoran government position

Minister of National Defense of El Salvador
- Ministro de Defensa Nacional
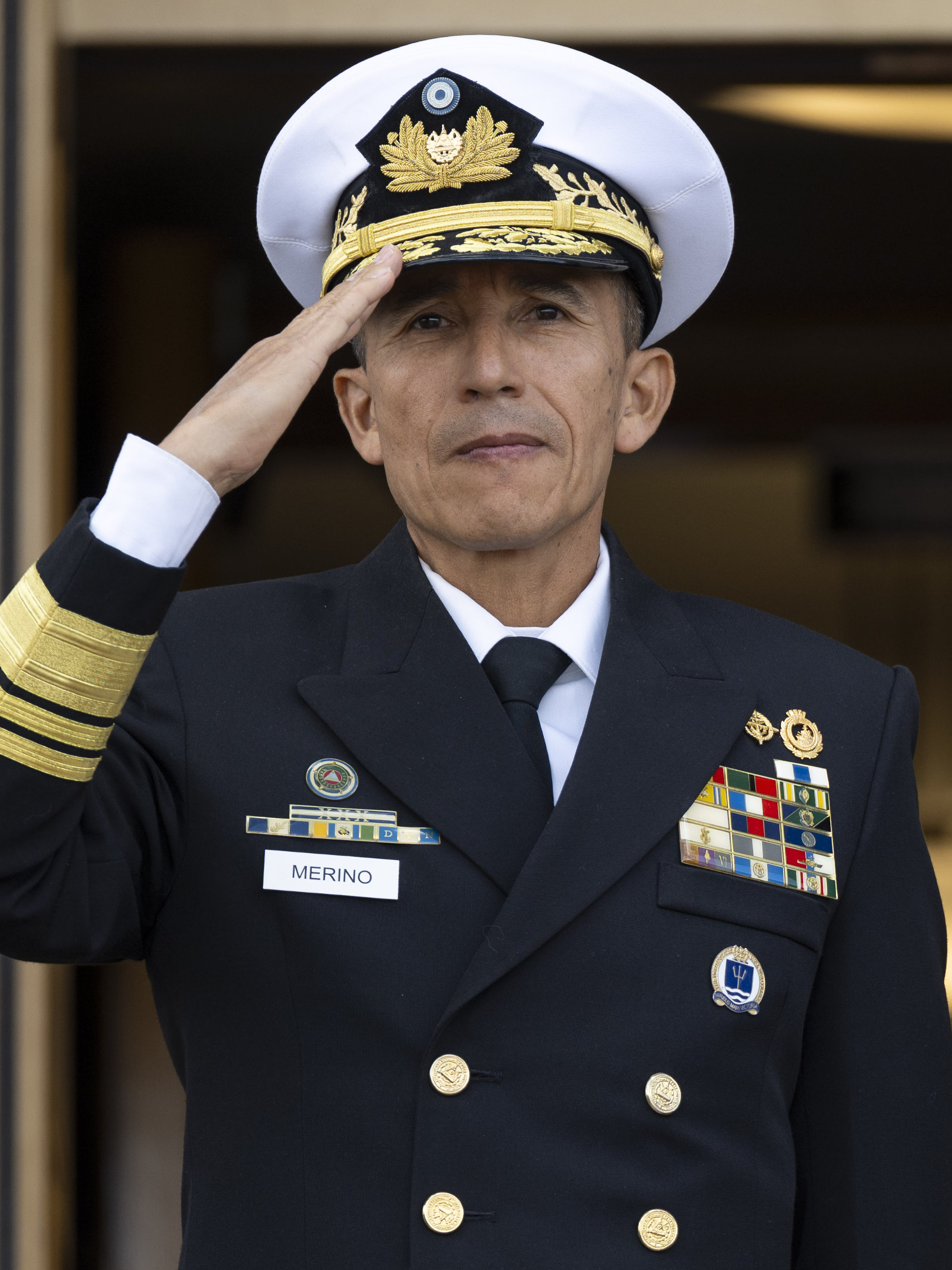
- Incumbent; René Francis Merino Monroy since 1 June 2019
- Ministry of National Defense
- Appointer: President of El Salvador
- Formation: 29 March 1856; 170 years ago
- First holder: Cruz Ulloa

The Minister of National Defense of El Salvador (Spanish: Ministro de Defensa Nacional de El Salvador) is a Salvadoran cabinet minister who serves as the head of the Ministry of National Defense of El Salvador. The position of Minister of National Defense is typically held by an officer of the Armed Forces of El Salvador.

== List of ministers ==
The following table lists all the individuals who held the office of Minister of National Defense.

No.	Portrait	Name (born–died)	Term of office			Branch/political party	President(s)
No.	Portrait	Name (born–died)	Took office	Left office	Time in office	Branch/political party	President(s)
1	Cruz Ulloa	Cruz Ulloa (?–?)	29 March 1856	30 April 1856	32 days	Conservative	Rafael Campo
Office vacant (30 April 1856 – 1 February 1858)
2	Ignacio Gómez	Ignacio Gómez (?–?)	1 February 1858	24 February 1858	23 days	Conservative	Miguel Santín del Castillo
3	Cayetano Bosque	Cayetano Bosque (?–?)	24 February 1858	21 November 1858	270 days	Liberal	Miguel Santín del Castillo
4	José Trinidad Cabañas	General; José Trinidad Cabañas (1805–1871)	26 November 1858	5 February 1859	76 days	Liberal/Army	Miguel Santín del Castillo
Office vacant (5 February 1859 – 20 December 1859)
5	José Félix Quirós	José Félix Quirós (1811–1883)	20 December 1859	6 June 1860	1 year, 122 days	Independent	Gerardo Barrios
Office vacant (6 June 1860 – 5 March 1861)
6	Eugenio Aguilar	Eugenio Aguilar (1804–1879)	5 March 1861	24 March 1863	2 years, 19 days	Liberal	Gerardo Barrios
Office vacant (24 March 1863 – 27 October 1863)
7	Juan Delgado y San Juan	Juan Delgado y San Juan (?–?)	27 October 1863	2 February 1865	1 year, 98 days	Conservative	Francisco Dueñas
Office vacant (2 February 1865 – 1 February 1871)
8	Rafael Zaldívar	Rafael Zaldívar (1837–1903)	1 February 1871	12 April 1871	70 days	Liberal	Francisco Dueñas
Office vacant (12 April 1871 – 2 January 1877)
9	Fabio Morán	Brigadier General; Fabio Morán (1830–1897)	2 January 1877	30 November 1877	332 days	Army	Rafael Zaldívar
Office vacant (30 November 1877 – 1 January 1884)
10	Adán Mora	Divisional General; Adán Mora (?–1895)	1 January 1884	14 May 1885	1 year, 133 days	Army	Rafael Zaldívar
Office vacant (14 May 1885 – 2 June 1887)
11	Carlos Ezeta	General; Carlos Ezeta (1852–1903)	2 June 1887	15 August 1888	261 days	Liberal/Army	Francisco Menéndez
12	Pedro José Escalón	General; Pedro José Escalón (1847–1923)	18 August 1888	20 October 1889	1 year, 140 days	Liberal/Army	Francisco Menéndez
Office vacant (20 October 1889 – 1 January 1891)
13	Antonio Ezeta	General; Antonio Ezeta (?–?)	1 January 1891	31 March 1891	89 days	Liberal/Army	Carlos Ezeta
14	Valentín Amaya	General; Valentín Amaya (?–?)	31 March 1891	23 January 1892	298 days	Army	Carlos Ezeta
15	Domingo Angulo	Domingo Angulo (?–?)	24 January 1892	14 November 1892	295 days	Liberal	Carlos Ezeta
14	Valentín Amaya	General; Valentín Amaya (?–?)	1 January 1893	10 June 1894	1 year, 160 days	Army	Carlos Ezeta
Office vacant (10 June 1894 – 4 March 1897)
16	Juan Francisco Castro	Juan Francisco Castro (?–?)	4 March 1897	27 September 1897	207 days	Liberal	Rafael Antonio Gutiérrez
17	Rafael Severo López	Rafael Severo López (?–?)	28 September 1897	13 November 1898	1 year, 47 days	Liberal	Rafael Antonio Gutiérrez
18	Tomás Regalado Romero	General; Tomás Regalado (1861–1906)	14 November 1898	12 September 1900	1 year, 302 days	Army/Liberal	Himself
Office vacant (12 September 1900 – 7 January 1901)
18	Tomás Regalado Romero	General; Tomás Regalado (1861–1906)	7 January 1901	1 March 1903	2 years, 53 days	Army/Liberal	Himself
19	Fernando Figueroa	Divisional General; Fernando Figueroa (1849–1919)	1 March 1903	10 September 1907	4 years, 193 days	Army/Liberal	Pedro José Escalón
19	Fernando Figueroa	Divisional General; Fernando Figueroa (1849–1919)	1 March 1903	10 September 1907	4 years, 193 days	Army/Liberal	Himself
Office vacant (10 September 1907 – 1 March 1911)
20	José María Peralta Lagos	General; José María Peralta Lagos (1873–1944)	1 March 1911	14 February 1913	1 year, 350 days	Army	Manuel Enrique Araujo
21	Francisco Martínez Suárez	Francisco Martínez Suárez (1864–1940)	14 February 1913	8 July 1913	144 days	Liberal	Carlos Meléndez
22	Alfonso Quiñónez Molina	Alfonso Quiñónez Molina (1874–1950)	8 July 1913	29 August 1914	1 year, 52 days	Liberal	Carlos Meléndez
23	Pío Romero Bosque	Pío Romero Bosque (1860–1935)	29 August 1914	1 March 1915	184 days	Liberal	Alfonso Quiñónez Molina
24	Luis Alonso Barahona	General; Luis Alonso Barahona (1867–1915)	1 March 1915	20 October 1915	233 days	Army	Carlos Meléndez
25	Enrique Córdova	Enrique Córdova (?–?)	20 October 1915	1 March 1919	3 years, 132 days	Liberal	Carlos Meléndez
23	Pío Romero Bosque	Pío Romero Bosque (1860–1935)	1 March 1919	1 March 1927	8 years, 0 days	National Democratic Party	Jorge Meléndez
23	Pío Romero Bosque	Pío Romero Bosque (1860–1935)	1 March 1919	1 March 1927	8 years, 0 days	National Democratic Party	Alfonso Quiñónez Molina
26	Alberto Gómez Zárate	Alberto Gómez Zárate (1883–1967)	1 March 1927	19 May 1930	3 years, 79 days	National Democratic Party	Pío Romero Bosque
27	Pío Romero Bosque Molina	Pío Romero Bosque Molina (?–?)	20 May 1930	1 March 1931	285 days	National Democratic Party	Pío Romero Bosque
28	Maximiliano Hernández Martínez	General; Maximiliano Hernández Martínez (1882–1966)	1 March 1931	1 December 1931	275 days	Army/National Republican Party	Arturo Araujo
29	Salvador López Rochac	Colonel; Salvador López Rochac (?–?)	1 December 1931	2 December 1931	1 day	Salvadoran Laborist Party	Arturo Araujo
–	Osmín Aguirre y Salinas	Colonel; Osmín Aguirre y Salinas (1889–1977) (Acting)	2 December 1931	4 December 1931	2 days	Army	Civic Directory
–	Joaquín Valdés	Colonel; Joaquín Valdés (1906–1957); Acting)	4 December 1931	2 April 1934	2 years, 122 days	Army	Maximiliano Hernández Martínez
–	Andrés Ignacio Menéndez	General; Andrés Ignacio Menéndez (1879–1962); Acting)	3 April 1934	28 August 1934	148 days	Army/National Pro Patria Party	Maximiliano Hernández Martínez
–	Maximiliano Hernández Martínez	General; Maximiliano Hernández Martínez (1882–1966); Acting)	28 August 1934	1 March 1935	185 days	Army/National Pro Patria Party	Andrés Ignacio Menéndez
30	Andrés Ignacio Menéndez	General; Andrés Ignacio Menéndez (1879–1962)	1 March 1935	9 May 1944	9 years, 69 days	Army/National Pro Patria Party	Maximiliano Hernández Martínez
–	Fidel Cristino Garay	General; Fidel Cristino Garay (?–?)	9 May 1944	20 October 1944	164 days	Army/National Pro Patria Party	Andrés Ignacio Menéndez
–	Salvador Peña Trejo	Colonel; Salvador Peña Trejo (?–?)	21 October 1944	1 March 1945	131 days	Army	Osmín Aguirre y Salinas
31	Salvador Castaneda Castro	General; Salvador Castaneda Castro (1888–1965)	1 March 1945	31 March 1945	30 days	Army/Unification Social Democratic Party	Himself
31	Mauro Espínola Castro	General; Mauro Espínola Castro (?–?)	31 March 1945	14 December 1948	3 years, 258 days	Army	Salvador Castaneda Castro
–	Fidel Rodríguez Quintanilla	Lieutenant Colonel; Fidel Rodríguez Quintanilla (?–?); Acting	14 December 1948	14 September 1950	1 year, 274 days	Army	Revolutionary Council of Government
32	Óscar Adán Bolaños	Major; Óscar Adán Bolaños (?–?)	14 September 1950	10 December 1953	3 years, 87 days	Army	Óscar Osorio
33	Marco Antonio Molina	Colonel; Marco Antonio Molina (?–?)	10 December 1953	14 September 1956	2 years, 279 days	Army	Óscar Osorio
34	Adán Parada	Colonel; Adán Parada (?–?)	14 September 1956	20 October 1960	4 years, 36 days	Army	José María Lemus
–	Alonso Castillo Navarrete	Lieutenant Colonel; Alonso Castillo Navarrete (?–?); Acting	20 October 1960	25 January 1961	97 days	Army	Junta of Government
–	Armando Molina Mena	Lieutenant Colonel; Armando Molina Mena (?–?); Acting	26 January 1961	9 May 1961	104 days	Army	Civic-Military Directory
–	Óscar Rodríguez Simó	Major; Óscar Rodríguez Simó (?–?); Acting	9 May 1961	18 November 1961	193 days	Army	Civic-Military Directory
–	Mariano Castro Morán	Major; Mariano Castro Morán (?–?); Acting	18 November 1961	24 January 1962	67 days	Army	Civic-Military Directory
–	Armando Díaz Liévano	Divisional General; Armando Díaz Liévano (?–?); Acting	24 January 1962	1 July 1962	158 days	Army	Civic-Military Directory
–	Armando Díaz Liévano	Divisional General; Armando Díaz Liévano (?–?); Acting	24 January 1962	1 July 1962	158 days	Army	Eusebio Rodolfo Cordón Cea
35	Marco Aurelio Zacapa	Colonel; Marco Aurelio Zacapa (?–?)	1 July 1962	1 July 1967	5 years, 0 days	Army/National Conciliation Party	Julio Adalberto Rivera Carballo
36	Fidel Torres	Colonel; Fidel Torres (?–?)	1 July 1967	1 July 1972	5 years, 0 days	Army/National Conciliation Party	Fidel Sánchez Hernández
37	Carlos Humberto Romero	General; Carlos Humberto Romero (1924–2017)	1 July 1972	1 July 1977	5 years, 0 days	Army/National Conciliation Party	Arturo Armando Molina
38	Federico Castillo Yanes	General; Federico Castillo Yanes (?–2013)	1 July 1977	15 October 1979	2 years, 106 days	Army/National Conciliation Party	Carlos Humberto Romero
–	José Guillermo García	General; José Guillermo García (born 1933); Acting	15 October 1979	19 April 1983	3 years, 186 days	Army	Revolutionary Government Junta
–	José Guillermo García	General; José Guillermo García (born 1933); Acting	15 October 1979	19 April 1983	3 years, 186 days	Army	Álvaro Magaña
39	Carlos Eugenio Vides Casanova	General; Carlos Eugenio Vides Casanova (1937–2023)	19 April 1983	1 June 1989	6 years, 43 days	Army	Álvaro Magaña
39	Carlos Eugenio Vides Casanova	General; Carlos Eugenio Vides Casanova (1937–2023)	19 April 1983	1 June 1989	6 years, 43 days	Army	José Napoleón Duarte
40	Rafael Humberto Larios López	General; Rafael Humberto Larios López (born 1937)	1 June 1989	31 August 1990	1 year, 91 days	Army	
40	Rafael Humberto Larios López	General; Rafael Humberto Larios López (born 1937)	1 June 1989	31 August 1990	1 year, 91 days	Army	Alfredo Cristiani
41	René Emilio Ponce	Divisional General; René Emilio Ponce (1947–2011)	31 August 1990	1 July 1993	2 years, 304 days	Army	Alfredo Cristiani
42	Humberto Corado Figueroa	Divisional General; Humberto Corado Figueroa (born 1948)	1 July 1993	31 December 1995	2 years, 183 days	Army	Alfredo Cristiani
42	Humberto Corado Figueroa	Divisional General; Humberto Corado Figueroa (born 1948)	1 July 1993	31 December 1995	2 years, 183 days	Army	Armando Calderón Sol
43	Jaime Mauricio Guzmán Morales	Divisional General; Jaime Mauricio Guzmán Morales (born ?)	31 December 1995	31 December 1998	3 years, 0 days	Army	Armando Calderón Sol
44	Juan Antonio Martínez Várela	Aviation General; Juan Antonio Martínez Várela (born 1952)	1 January 1999	1 June 2004	5 years, 152 days	Air Force	Armando Calderón Sol
44	Juan Antonio Martínez Várela	Aviation General; Juan Antonio Martínez Várela (born 1952)	1 January 1999	1 June 2004	5 years, 152 days	Air Force	Francisco Flores Pérez
45	Otto Alejandro Romero Orellana	Divisional General; Otto Alejandro Romero Orellana (born 1955)	1 June 2004	31 December 2007	3 years, 213 days	Army	Antonio Saca
46	Otto Alejandro Romero Orellana	Divisional General; Jorge Alberto Molina Contreras (born 1956)	31 December 2007	1 June 2009	1 year, 152 days	Army	Antonio Saca
47	David Munguía Payés	Divisional General; David Munguía Payés (born ?)	1 June 2009	23 November 2011	2 years, 175 days	Army	Mauricio Funes
48	José Atilio Benítez Parada	Divisional General; Atilio Benítez (born 1958)	23 November 2011	12 July 2013	1 year, 231 days	Army	Mauricio Funes
47	David Munguía Payés	Divisional General; David Munguía Payés (born ?)	12 July 2013	1 June 2019	5 years, 324 days	Army	Mauricio Funes
47	David Munguía Payés	Divisional General; David Munguía Payés (born ?)	12 July 2013	1 June 2019	5 years, 324 days	Army	Salvador Sánchez Cerén
49	René Merino Monroy	Admiral; René Francis Merino Monroy (born 1963)	1 June 2019	Incumbent	7 years, 99 days	Navy	Nayib Bukele

== See also ==
- President of El Salvador
