= Atilio Benítez =

Salvadoran military officer and diplomat

Divisional General Atilio Benítez
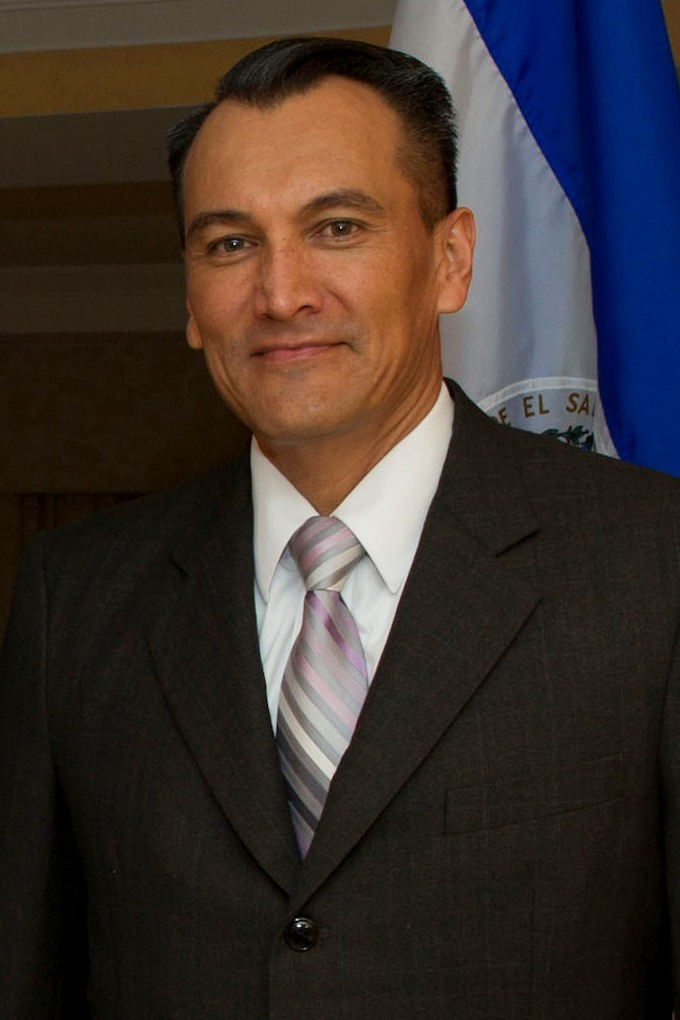
- Benítez in 2012

47th Minister of National Defense of El Salvador
- In office 23 November 2011 – 12 July 2013
- President: Mauricio Funes
- Preceded by: David Munguía Payés
- Succeeded by: David Munguía Payés

Ambassador of El Salvador to Germany
- In office 24 April 2015 – ?
- President: Salvador Sánchez Cerén
- Preceded by: Leandro Uzquiano Arriaza
- Succeeded by: ?

Ambassador of El Salvador to Spain
- In office 5 May 2014 – March 2015
- President: Mauricio Funes; Salvador Sánchez Cerén
- Preceded by: Edgardo Suárez Mallagray
- Succeeded by: Jorge Alberto Palencia Mena

Personal details
- Born: José Atilio Benítez Parada; 21 June 1958 (age 67) San Miguel, El Salvador
- Spouse: Emma Isaura Muños
- Occupation: Military officer, diplomat

Military service
- Allegiance: El Salvador
- Branch/service: Salvadoran Army
- Rank: Divisional general
- Commands: Cuscatlán Battalion IX
- Battles/wars: Iraq War

José Atilio Benítez Parada (born 21 June 1958) is a Salvadoran former military officer and diplomat who served as Minister of National Defense from 2011 to 2013. He also commanded the Cuscatlán Battalion during the Iraq War from 2007 to 2008.

== Biography ==
In 1992 he was military attaché in Madrid, Bonn, Paris and London.

Benítez was the commander of the Cuscatlán Battalion IX, a contingent of Salvadoran soldiers deployed to Iraq during the Iraq War, from August 2007 to February 2008.

In 2009 he was Inspector of the Armed Forces of El Salvador.

On 1 June 2009, Mauricio Funes named Divisional General David Munguía Payés as Minister of National Defense and Benítez as Vice Minister of National Defense.

From 23 November 2011 to 12 July 2013, Benítez was Minister of National Defense in the cabinet of Mauricio Funes.

From 5 May 2014 to March 2015 he was ambassador in Madrid.

From 24 April 2015, he has served as ambassador in Berlin with accreditation in Warsaw, Prague and Ankara.

== Personal life ==
Benítez is married to Emma Isaura Muños.

== Legal troubles ==
In 2014, the Office of the Attorney General (FGR) opened an investigation into Benítez for alleged weapons trafficking. During a July 2025 trial, Benítez admitted to legalizing his possession of 21 firearms in 2011 using an expire legislative decree as a part of a plea deal. On 9 July 2025, the Fourth Sentencing Court of San Salvador convicted Benítez of arbitrary acts and weapons trafficking while acquitting him of fraud and embezzlement charges. The court sentenced him to three years imprisonment but commuted the sentence to community service.

In 2023, Benítez was ordered by a court in Santa Tecla to return US$121,000 to the Salvadoran government after determining that he and his wife were unable to justify how they accumulated US$88,000 from 2009 to 2011.

== See also ==
- Cabinet of Salvador Sánchez Cerén

Political offices
Preceded by David Munguía Payés	Minister of National Defense of El Salvador; 2011–2013	Succeeded by David Munguía Payés
