= National Republican Party (El Salvador) =

Salvadoran political party

National Republican Party Partido Republicano Nacional
- Abbreviation: PRN
- Founded: 1930
- Dissolved: 1931
- Succeeded by: National Pro Patria Party
- Headquarters: San Salvador, El Salvador
- Ideology: Nationalism

The National Republican Party (Partido Republicano Nacional) was a Salvadoran political party that existed from 1930 to 1931.

The party supported General Maximiliano Hernández Martínez during the 1931 presidential election. The party joined a coalition with Arturo Araujo's Labor Party during the 1931 general election. The coalition failed to win a majority but Araujo was elected president by the Legislative Assembly and Maximiliano Hernández Martínez became vice president.

The party was dissolved following the 1931 Salvadoran coup d'état but was later turned into the National Pro Patria Party.

== Electoral history ==
=== Presidential elections ===
Election	Candidate	Votes	%	Result	Ref.
1931	Supported Arturo Araujo	106,777	46.65%	Elected ✓	

=== Legislative Assembly elections ===
Election	Votes	%	Position	Seats	+/–	Status in legislature
1931	Unknown	Unknown	Unknown	Unknown	New	Government

== See also ==
- Salvadoran Laborist Party
- National Pro Patria Party
