= National Stadium of El Salvador =

Future venue in Antiguo Cuscatlán, El Salvador

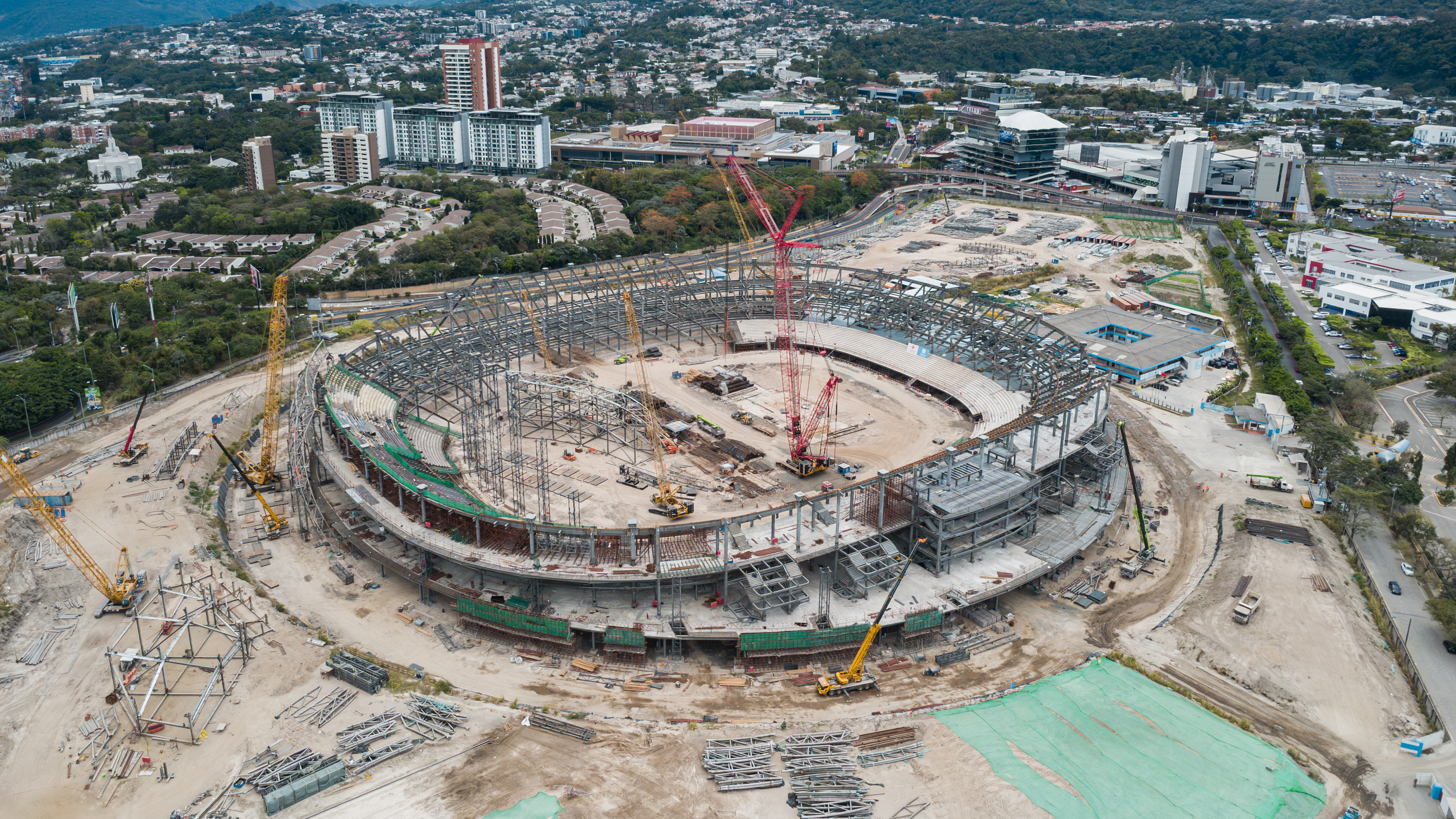
- The stadium under construction in 2026
- Interactive map of National Stadium of El Salvador
- Location: Antiguo Cuscatlán
- Coordinates: 13°40′56″N 89°15′12″W
- Owner: Government of El Salvador
- Operator: INDES
- Capacity: 50,000
- Surface: GrassMaster
- Scoreboard: Yes

Construction
- Groundbreaking: 8 September 2022
- Opened: 2027 (planned)
- Cost: US$500 million
- Project manager: Government of El Salvador
- General contractors: China State Construction Engineering Corporation(Group) Co., Ltd.

Tenant
- El Salvador national football team (from 2027)

The National Stadium of El Salvador (Spanish: Estadio Nacional de El Salvador) is a 50,000-seat multi-purpose stadium under construction in Antiguo Cuscatlán, El Salvador intended as a replacement for the El Salvador national football team's current stadium, Estadio Cuscatlán. The stadium is being built on the site of the former Captain General Gerardo Barrios Military School. The construction of the US$500 million stadium began on 8 September 2022. It will be the second modern sports and event arena to be built in Central America.

Once built, it will have a hotel outside the stadium, an auditorium, medical clinic, rooms inside the stadium, administrative offices, and a multi-sports area outside the stadium with beach soccer, basketball courts, fast football fields, and a parking area for 2,000 vehicles.

== Funding and construction ==
The initial cost was $100 million; it grew to $500 million.

The Chinese government will finance the construction of the stadium in its totality, along with its furnishing, and assume all other costs.

The construction of the stadium formed part of the agreements signed between the presidents of El Salvador and China, Nayib Bukele and Xi Jinping, respectively, during Jinpings' first visit to the Central American country in 2019.

On 1 April 2022, the Chinese embassy in San Salvador announced that the Specific Delegation Group of China Aviation Planning and Design Institute (Group) Co., Ltd. signed the minutes of foreign conversation on research and design of the stadium project with the INDES representative.

On 16 May 2022, the Chinese embassy announced the start date of construction.

On 8 June 2022, demolition of the Captain General Gerardo Barrios Military School started.

On 8 September 2022, the stadium broke ground.

On 30 November 2023, just before taking a presidential leave of absence to participate in the 2024 presidential election, Bukele laid the first stone of the stadium for construction to begin, together with the Ambassador of China in El Salvador, Zhang Yanhui.

The Chinese company China State Construction Engineering Corporation (Group) Co., Ltd is in charge of the construction of the stadium.
