= Juan Antonio Martínez Varela =

Minister of Defense of El Salvador

Aviation General Juan Antonio Martínez Varela
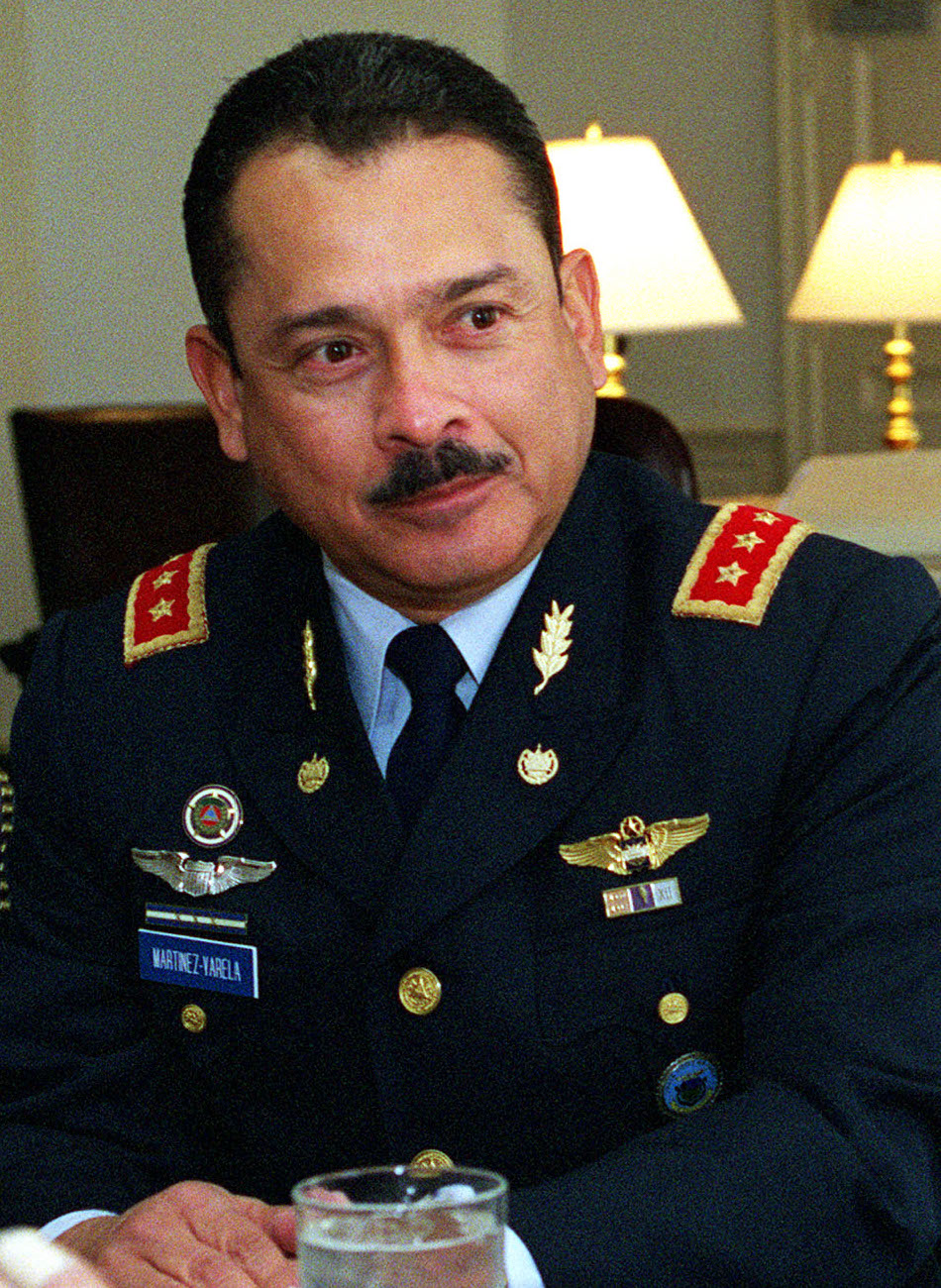
- Martínez Varela in 2001

Minister of National Defense of El Salvador
- In office 1 January 1999 – 1 January 2004
- President: Armando Calderón Sol; Francisco Flores Pérez
- Preceded by: Jaime Guzmán Morales
- Succeeded by: Otto Romero

Personal details
- Born: 1952 (age 73–74) San Salvador, El Salvador
- Education: Captain General Gerardo Barrios Military School
- Occupation: Military officer
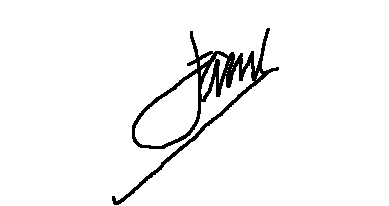
- Signature

Military service
- Allegiance: El Salvador
- Branch/service: Salvadoran Army; Salvadoran Air Force
- Years of service: 1975–2004
- Rank: Aviation general
- Battles/wars: Salvadoran Civil War

Juan Antonio Martínez Varela Martínez (born 1952) is a retired Salvadoran military officer and pilot who served as Minister of National Defense from 1999 until 2004. He was also Chief of the General Staff of the Salvadoran Air Force and Chief of the Joint Chiefs of Staff of the Armed Forces of El Salvador.

== Early life ==
Juan Antonio Martínez Varela Martínez was born in 1952 in San Salvador, El Salvador. Martínez Varela's parents were Colonel Juan Antonio Martínez Varela Jule and Bertha Isabel Martínez Martínez de Varela. Martínez Varela's father served as Minister of the Interior during the presidency of Alfredo Cristiani from 1989 to 1994 and signed the Chapultepec Peace Accords that ended the Salvadoran Civil War in 1992. Martínez Varela has seven siblings.

== Military career ==
Martínez Varela enrolled in the Captain General Gerardo Barrios Military School in February 1969 and graduated December 1975 with rank of sub-lieutenant in the Salvadoran Army. He received pilot training and became a certified flight instructor in Texas, United States. He received further flight training in Israel. He returned to the United States and completed training courses for command and general staff roles. In El Salvador, he completed the Advanced Analysis Course at the Higher Intelligence School.

Martínez Varela held several commands in the Salvadoran Air Force. He was commander of the Combat Wing, chief of Operations of the Air General Staff, and commander of the 2nd Air Brigade. From 1990 to 1991, he was the commander of the Aeronautic Military Education and Instruction Center. In 1992, he was promoted to colonel. From June 1993 to June 1998, Martínez Varela was Chief of General Staff of the Salvadoran Air Force. He was promoted to brigadier general in 1997 and to aviation general (equivalent of divisional general) in June 1998. That month, he became Chief of the Joint Chiefs of Staff of the Armed Forces of El Salvador.

=== Minister of National Defense ===
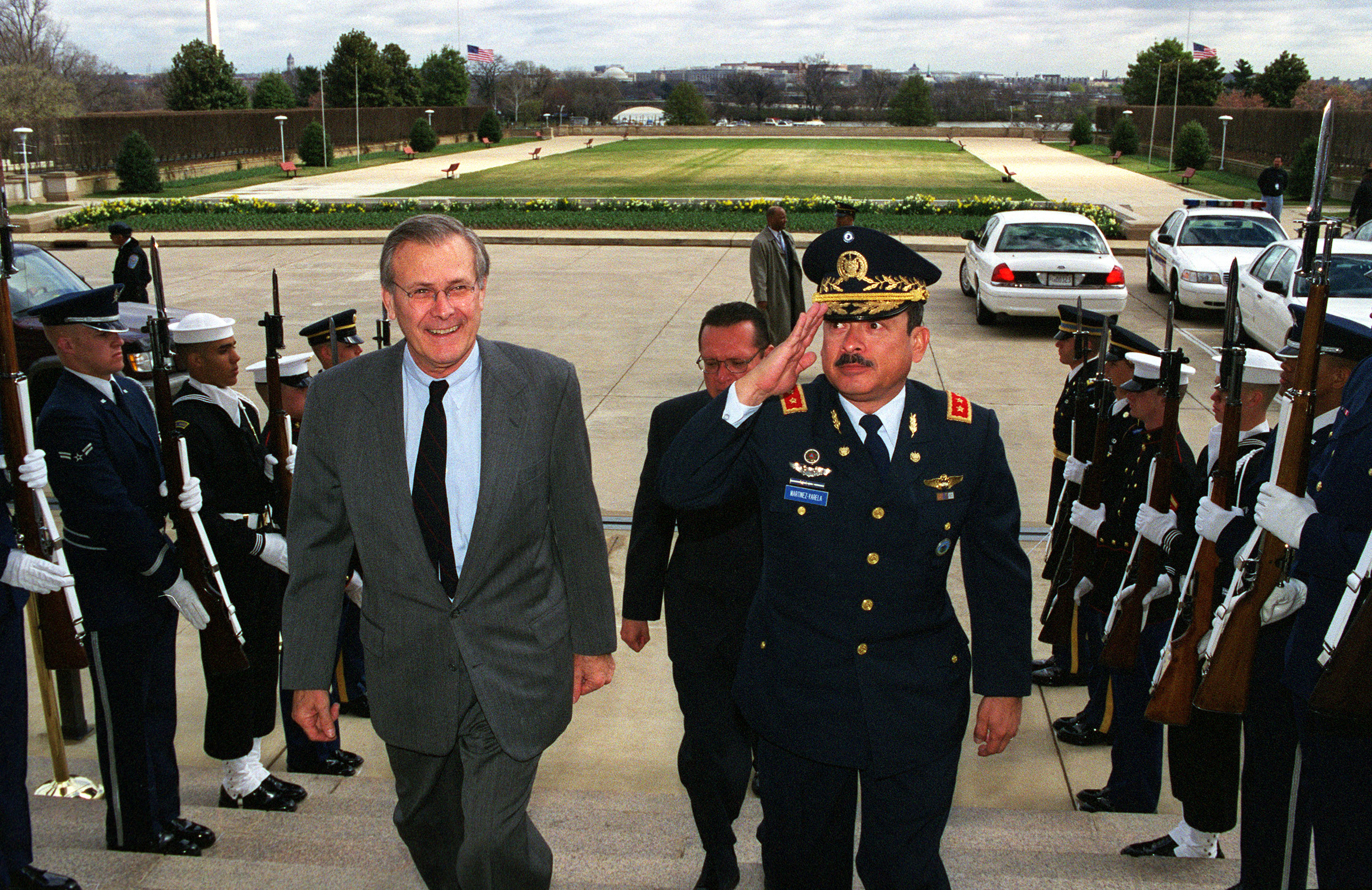
Martínez Varela with Donald Rumsfeld in Washington, D.C. on 30 March 2001

President Armando Calderón Sol appointed Martínez Varela as Minister of National Defense on 1 January 1999, replacing Divisional General Jaime Guzmán Morales. The Farabundo Martí National Liberation Front questioned Guzmán Morales' replacement as being politically motivated while Calderón Sol assured that it was merely a restructuring. Martínez Varela served as Minister of National Defense for the remainder of Calderón Sol's presidency as well as throughout the presidency of Francisco Flores Pérez.

On 7 May 2003, Martínez Varela awarded United States general James T. Hill the Gold Medal for Distinguished Service. In late 2003, Martínez Varela visited soldiers of the Cuscatlán Battalion in Iraq who were deployed to render humanitarian aid during the Iraq War. Martínez Varela was replaced by Divisional General Otto Romero when Flores' term ended on 1 June 2004.

== Awards and decorations ==
El Salvador

- 1980–1992 Military Campaign Medal (XII)
- 30 Year Service Ribbon
- Fighter's Medal

Guatemala

- White Nun Medal

== Dates of ranks ==
Insignia	Rank	Service branch	Date of promotion
Sub-lieutenant	Sub-lieutenant	Army	December 1975
Lieutenant	Lieutenant	Air Force	?
Captain	Captain	Air Force	?
Major captain	Major captain	Air Force	?
Lieutenant colonel	Lieutenant colonel	Air Force	before 1990
Colonel	Colonel	Air Force	1992
Brigadier General	Brigadier general	Air Force	1997
Aviation General	Aviation general	Air Force	June 1998

Political offices
Preceded by Div. Gen. Jaime Guzmán Morales	Minister of National Defense of El Salvador; 1999–2004	Succeeded by Div. Gen. Otto Romero
Military offices
Preceded by Lt. Col. Ernesto Koeningsberg	Commander of the Aeronautic Military; Education and Instruction Center; 1990–1991	Succeeded by Lt. Col. José Ricardo Castro
