= Pío Romero Bosque =

President of El Salvador from 1927 to 1931

Doctor Pío Romero Bosque
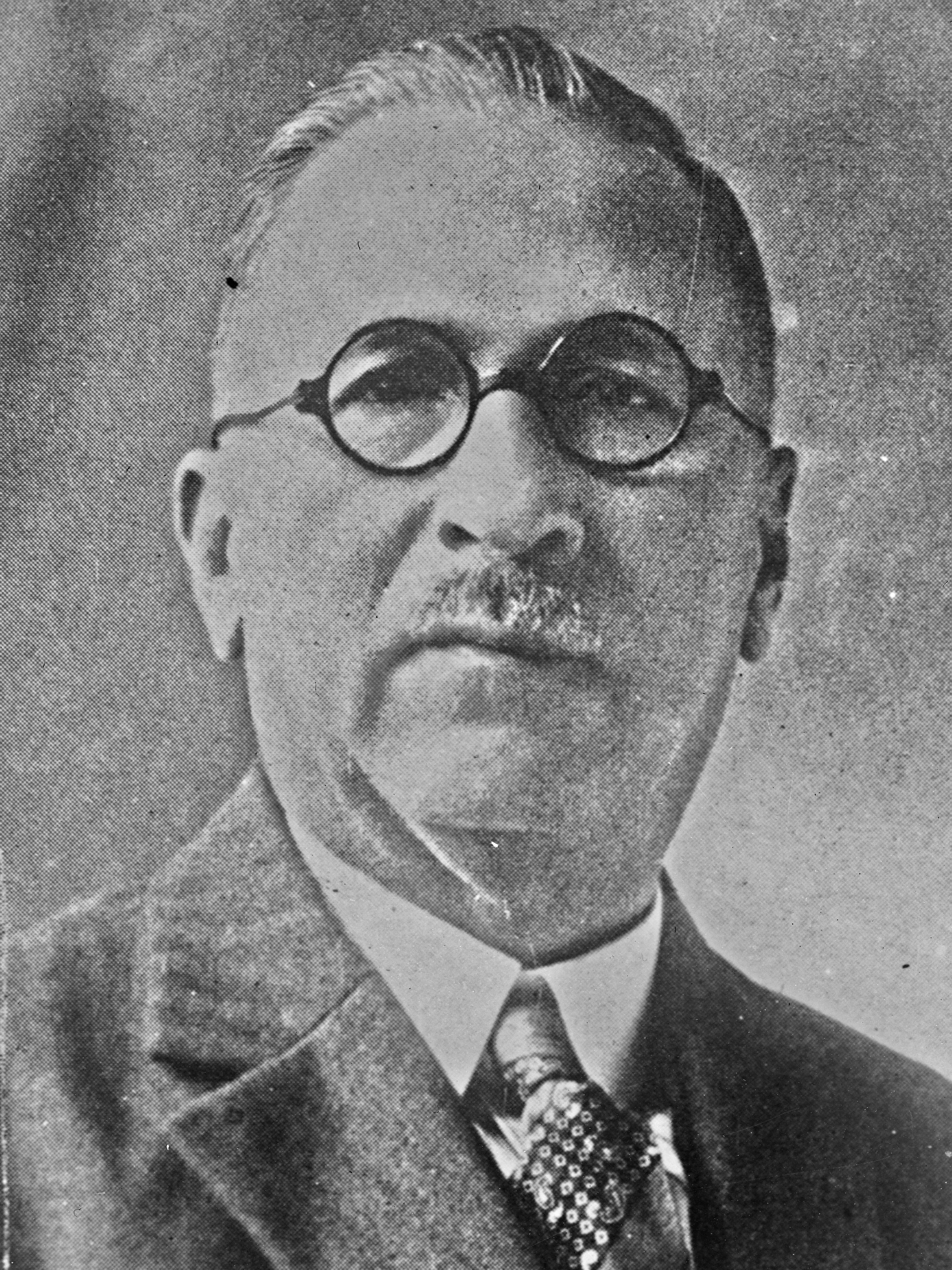
- Romero in 1927

25th President of El Salvador
- In office 1 March 1927 – 1 March 1931
- Vice President: Gustavo Vides
- Preceded by: Alfonso Quiñónez Molina
- Succeeded by: Arturo Araujo

29th Vice President of El Salvador
- In office 1 March 1923 – 1 March 1927
- President: Alfonso Quiñónez Molina
- Preceded by: Alfonso Quiñónez Molina
- Succeeded by: Gustavo Vides
Other offices
40th President of the Supreme Court of Justice of El Salvador
In office 1914–1919
Preceded by	Víctor Jerez
Succeeded by	Francisco Martínez Suárez
23rd Minister of War, the Navy, and Aviation of El Salvador
In office 1 March 1919 – 1 March 1927
President	Jorge Meléndez; Alfonso Quiñónez Molina
Preceded by	Enrique Córdova
Succeeded by	Alberto Gómez Zárate
In office 29 August 1914 – 1 March 1915
President	Alfonso Quiñónez Molina
Preceded by	Alfonso Quiñónez Molina
Succeeded by	Luis Alonso Barahona
Minister of Governance, Development, and Public Instruction of El Salvador
In office 1903–1907
President	Pedro José Escalón
Preceded by	José Rosa Pacas
Succeeded by	Isidro Paredes
Deputy of the Legislative Assembly of El Salvador
In office 1892–1893

Personal details
- Born: 1860 Suchitoto, El Salvador
- Died: 10 December 1935 (aged 74–75) Nicaragua
- Party: National Democratic Party (until 1927); Independent (from 1927)
- Spouse: Amparo Molina (m. 1891)
- Children: 3
- Relatives: Alfonso Quiñónez Molina (brother-in-law)
- Education: University of El Salvador
- Occupation: Politician, judge, lawyer

Pío Romero Bosque (1860 – 10 December 1935), contemporarily referred to as Don Pío, was a Salvadoran politician and lawyer who served as the 25th President of El Salvador from 1927 to 1931. He had previously served as Alfonso Quiñónez Molina's Vice President from 1923 to 1927 and as El Salvador's Minister of War, the Navy, and Aviation (Minister of War) from 1919 to 1927.

Romero completed his Doctor of Law in 1889 and was shortly afterwards appointed by the Supreme Court of Justice to serve as a judge. He served as a judge in San Salvador and Zacatecoluca during the 1890s and 1900s and also served as a magistrate on the Supreme Court of Justice itself from 1893 to 1895 and again from 1899 to 1903. He also briefly served as a deputy of the Legislative Assembly from 1892 to 1893 before resigning to serve on the Supreme Court of Justice. From 1903 to 1907, Romero served as the Minister of Governance, Development, and Public Instruction under President Pedro José Escalón. From 1914 to 1919, he served as the president of the Supreme Court of Justice.

Romero became President of El Salvador in 1927. El Salvador's economy early in Romero's government benefited from high coffee prices and taxation reforms, but the Great Depression and the collapse of coffee prices crippled El Salvador's economy as it was heavily dependent on coffee exports. Romero distanced himself from the Meléndez–Quiñónez dynasty that preceded him and implemented various democratic reforms. Romero's government survived an attempted coup by supporters of the Meléndez–Quiñónez political dynasty in December 1927. Romero did not hand-pick a presidential successor as his predecessors had done and was succeeded by Arturo Araujo who won the 1931 presidential election, considered by historians to be El Salvador's first free and fair democratic election. Romero fled El Salvador during the presidency of Brigadier General Maximiliano Hernández Martínez, whose government reversed all of Romero's democratic reforms after overthrowing Araujo in late 1931. Romero died in exile in Nicaragua in 1935.

== Early life ==
Pío Romero Bosque was born in 1860 in Suchitoto, El Salvador, to Serapío Romero and Rosario Bosque. Bosque was of Spanish descent. Through Romero's mother, he was a descendant of Cayetano Bosque, a liberal who served as Minister of War in 1858. Romero was a landowner, owning a hacienda in San Salvador and Santiago Nonualco named "El Rosario" and "Nahualapa", respectively.

== Legal career ==
Romero completed his bachelor's degree at the Ciencias y Letras college of Santa Tecla and completed his Doctor of Law at the University of El Salvador in 1889. Later that year, the Supreme Court of Justice appointed Romero to serve as the supplementary judge of the 1st circuit of the San Salvador Department. A few months after this appointment, he was named as the proprietary judge of the Zacatecoluca district; he served in this position for two years.

In 1892 and 1893, Romero was elected as a deputy of the Legislative Assembly. He resigned in 1893 following his appointment as the fourth magistrate of the Supreme Court of Justice. His term ended in 1895 and he resumed his role as the proprietary judge of Zacatecoluca until 1899. Romero served a second term as a supreme court magistrate from 1899 until 14 April 1903. In 1914, Romero became the president of the Supreme Court of Justice; he served in this position until 1919.

== Political career ==
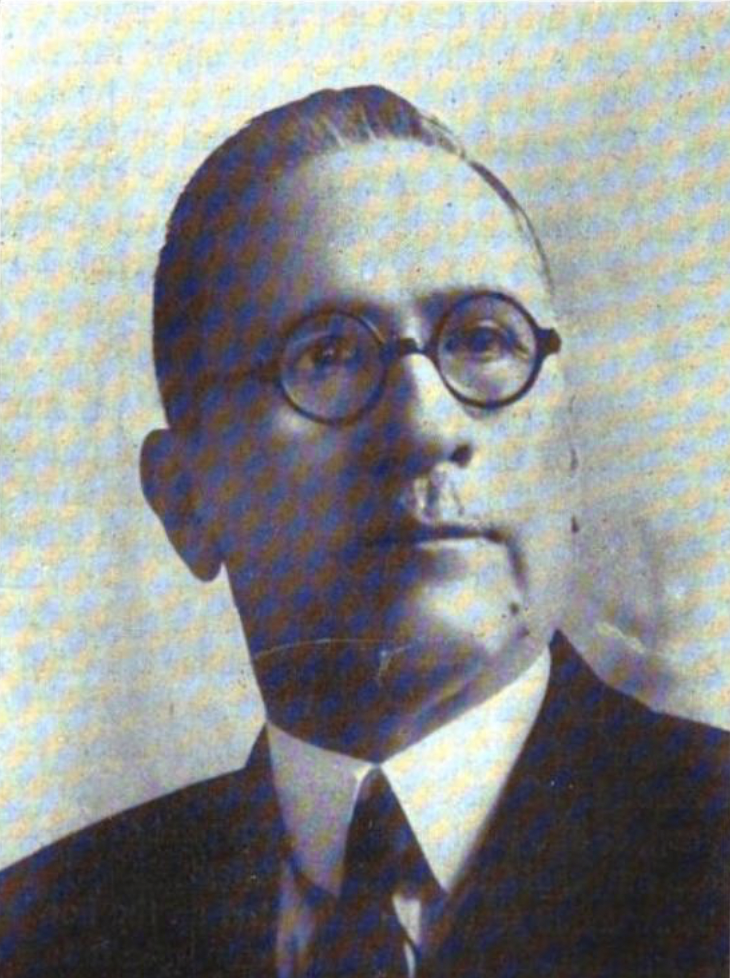
Romero as Vice President of El Salvador (c. 1923–1925)

On 12 March 1903, President Pedro José Escalón appointed Romero as El Salvador's Vice Secretary of Governance and Development, and later that year he was promoted to serve as Minister of Governance, Development, and Public Instruction, succeeding Doctor José Rosa Pacas. During the 1919 presidential election, President Alfonso Quiñónez Molina (who was Romero's brother-in-law) and presidential front-runner Jorge Meléndez installed Romero as a presidential candidate in order to receive more votes than Arturo Araujo, another presidential candidate, in an effort to humiliate Araujo for attempting to challenge Jorge's presidential bid. Quiñónez's government sent telegrams to polling stations across El Salvador instructing them to rig votes in favor of Meléndez first and Romero second. Romero came in second place, receiving 4,370 votes to Jorge's 166,441 votes and Araujo's 1,022 votes. Upon assuming the presidency, Jorge appointed Romero as the minister of war, the navy, and aviation (minister of war).

=== Vice presidency ===
During the 1923 presidential election, Romero was elected to serve as Quiñónez's Vice President. Upon assuming office on 1 March 1923, Quiñonez appointed Romero to continue serving as Minister of War, an office he would hold until 1927. As Minister of War, Romero implemented military reforms that improved training standards. On 26 January 1927, Romero issued a decree that renamed the country's military academy to the Captain General Gerardo Barrios Military School. Romero forged a strong relationship with the Salvadoran military while holding his minister position.

In 1926, as the following year's presidential election approached, Quiñónez hand-picked Romero to succeed him as president. Romero ran for office unopposed and won the election unanimously on 13 January 1927 as a member of the ruling National Democratic Party (PND). Gustavo Vides, an engineer, was elected as Romero's vice president; Quiñónez also hand-picked Vides, who previously served as Quiñónez's Minister of Finance.

== Presidency ==
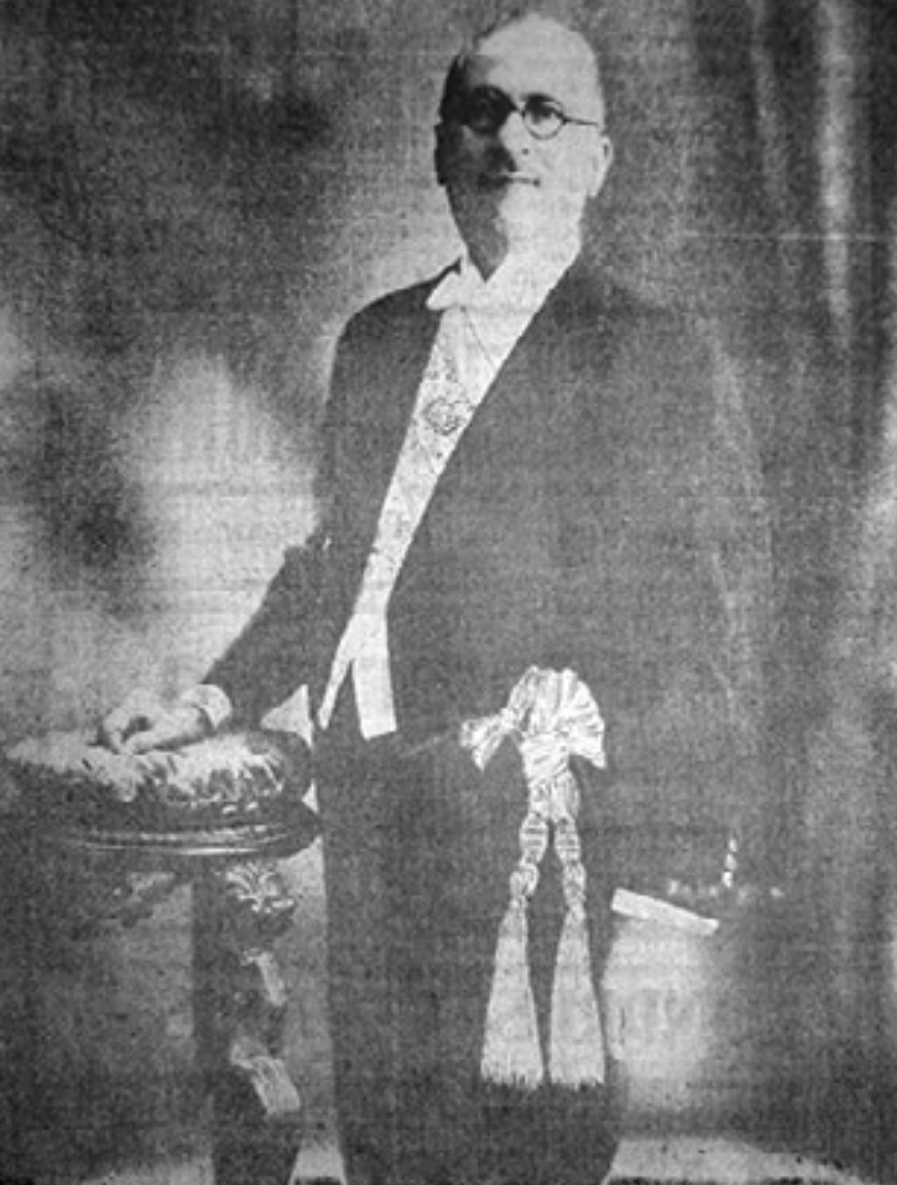
Official portrait of Romero taken on 1 March 1927 by the El Día newspaper

Romero assumed the presidency on 1 March 1927 between 9 and 10 a.m. CST. He appointed the following individuals to his cabinet: Doctor José Gustavo Guerrero as Minister of Foreign Relations; (Note: During Romero's presidency, Doctor Francisco Martínez Suárez succeeded Guerrero as minister of foreign relations.) Doctor Manuel Vicente Mendoza as Minister of Governance, Development, Agriculture, and Labor; and Doctor Alberto Gómez Zárate as Minister of War, the Navy, and Aviation. (Note: Romero's son, Pío Romero Bosque Molina, succeeded Zárate as Minister of War, the Navy, and Aviation on 19 May 1930.) Romero was an economic and social conservative, unlike all his predecessors dating back to 1871 who were all idealist or pragmatic liberals.

=== Anticipation of a puppet presidency ===
Quiñónez hand-picked Romero as his successor believing him to be a trusted collaborator who would continue the Meléndez–Quiñónez dynasty, a political dynasty that had ruled El Salvador since Carlos Meléndez became president in 1913. Romero was chosen to continue the dynasty as neither the Meléndez's nor the Quiñónez's had any family members who were eligible or willing to become the next president of El Salvador. Furthermore, Quiñónez intended to be able to control Romero as a puppet ruler. Likewise, contemporary public opinion believed that Romero would continue the Meléndez–Quiñónez dynasty's politics and policies during his presidency.

Cornelius Van Hemert Engert, the United States chargé d'affaires to El Salvador, described Romero as "weak and irresolute". Jefferson Caffery, the United States ambassador to El Salvador, referred to Romero as a man "of no particular force, and with probably no superfluous amount of backbone". Engert believed that Quiñónez selected Romero to act as a puppet ruler due to his perceived weakness and that Quiñónez would continue to govern the country from behind the scenes as he had been appointed as the first presidential designate, making Quiñónez second in line to the presidency after Vides.

=== Ending the Meléndez–Quiñónez dynasty ===
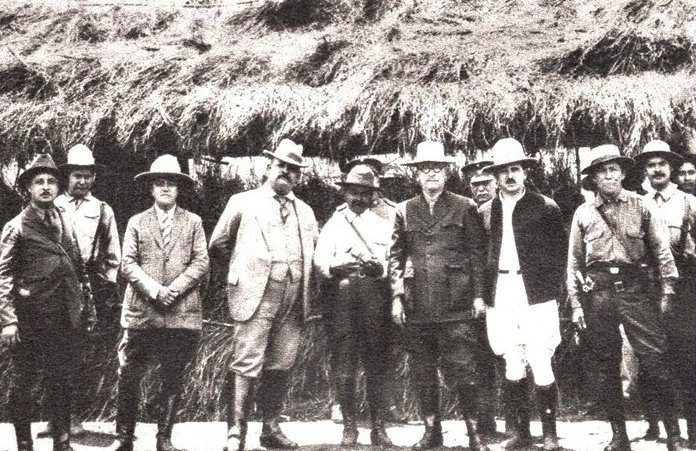
Then-Vice President Romero (sixth from the left) with President Alfonso Quiñónez Molina and other cabinet members in 1926

One month into Romero's presidency, he forced Marcos Letona and Salvador Rivas, the two Vice Secretaries of Development and Public Instruction, to resign despite an agreement between Romero and Quiñónez to maintain certain political appointments in place; Quiñónez, subsequently, accused Romero of failing to uphold his political promises. Engert believed that these decisions were part of Romero's "campaign to do away with the Quiñónez influence". Romero also lifted a state of emergency which was in effect throughout Quiñónez's presidency, ended press censorship, and allowed public demonstrations. These reforms led to public protests against Quiñónez's appointment as the first presidential designate, and students from the University of El Salvador called for his resignation. After pressure from Romero's supporters, protestors, and even some high-ranking military officers, Quiñónez resigned and left the country for exile in France.

In December 1927, Jorge, Quiñónez, and their allies plotted a coup to overthrow Romero in an attempt to continue the political dynasty that their families had created. On 6 December 1927, Colonel Juan Aberle (Chief of the Army Machine Shop) and Major Manuel Noguera (Deputy Chief of Police) presented an ultimatum to Romero demanding him to resign and accept the formation of a military junta in exchange for safe passage out of El Salvador. Romero ordered both men to be arrested, and Aberle and Noguera were subsequently court martialed and executed by firing squad on 8 December 1927. A planned attack by 500 militants commanded by Jorge failed to support Aberle and Noguera as was planned. Hundreds of conspirators were arrested after the failed coup attempt, and Jorge fled the country to Honduras. The coup's failure ended what remaining influence the Meléndez–Quiñónez dynasty had in Salvadoran politics. As a result of the coup attempt, Romero re-implemented the state of emergency and press censorship until March 1929.

=== Economic policies ===
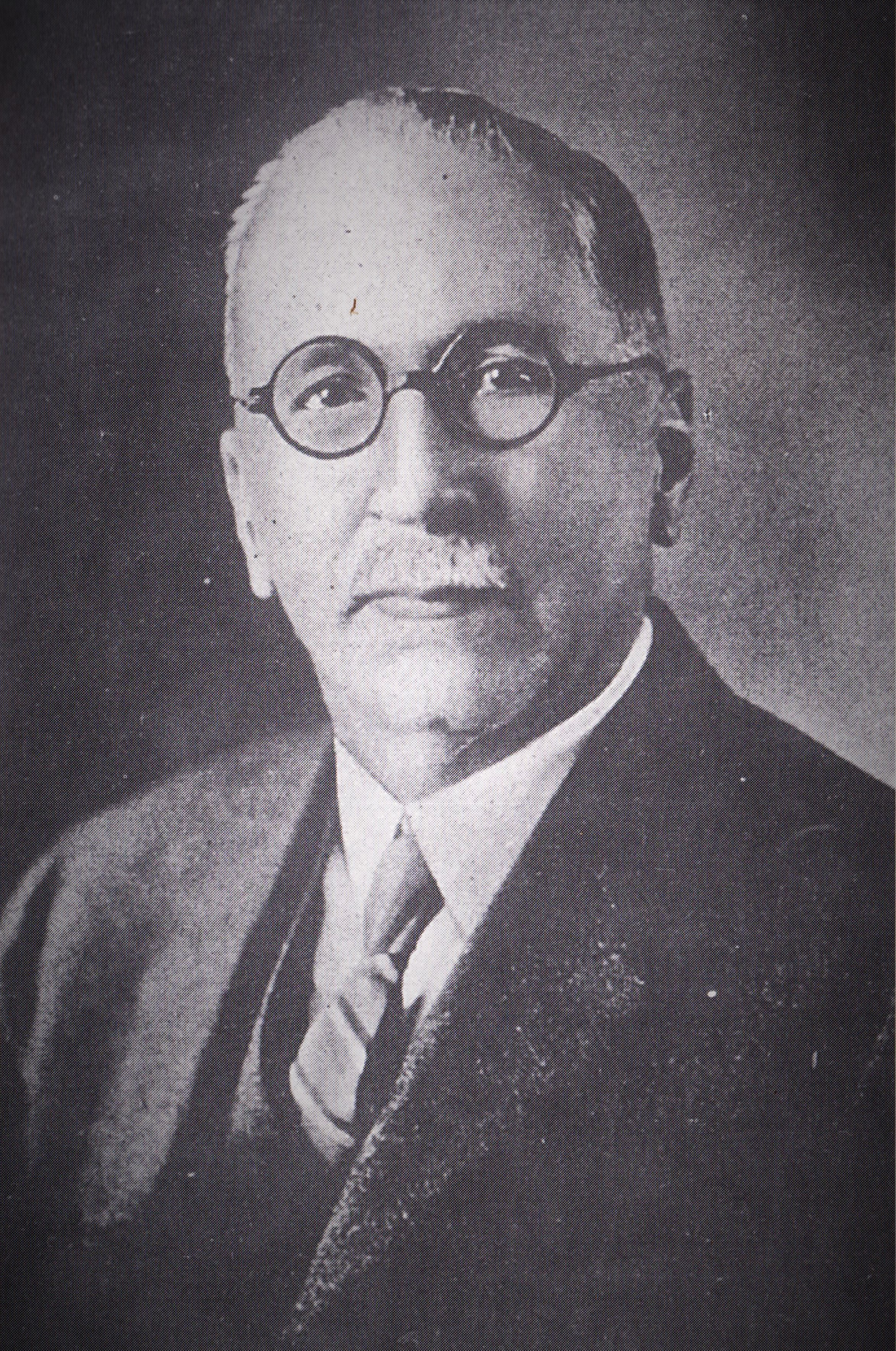
Romero in c. 1923–1925

At the start of Romero's presidency, coffee prices were high and El Salvador's coffee exports were at record highs. Meanwhile, Romero inherited a budget deficit and SV₡23.8 million of debt from his predecessor that resulted from issuing a high amount of fiscal bonds. In Romero's inaugural address, he stated that he intended to fix the country's financial situation. In 1927, he implemented several new taxes on imports to raise funding for the government and military. He also implemented a tax on all general stores operated by men in an effort to promote women's involvement in the economy. Romero granted tax exemptions on the cultivations of certain crops due to unrest from agricultural laborers regarding the tax rates. International trade with Guatemala and Honduras was also granted exemptions from taxation. The Ministry of Finance reported that the reforms implemented in 1927 and 1928 had positive impacts on the country's economy as economic output increased.

In 1929, the Great Depression led to the collapse of coffee prices, crippling El Salvador's economy as it was heavily reliant on coffee exports. Prices fell from SV₡39 per 100 pounds (45 kg) in 1928 to SV₡18 per 100 pounds by 1931. Wages also fell by over half of their pre-depression values. These economic conditions led to 80,000 laborers forming militant unions in western El Salvador that organized strikes and protests against Romero's government. Romero responded by outlawing rallies and demonstrations, and thousands were arrested. By the end of Romero's presidency, El Salvador's debt stood at around US$4 million (equivalent to $84,682,713 in 2025).

=== Democratic reforms ===
Romero sought to implement democratic reforms in El Salvador, but historians are unsure what Romero's motives were as he never publicly gave a reason for doing so. Scholar Patricia Alvarenga theorized that Romero may have implemented democratic reforms in order to combat the rising radicalization of laborers in the country. Historian Erik Ching theorized that Romero "associated democracy with modernization" and wanted to "thrust El Salvador into the modern era". Others suggest that Romero sought to appease the United States in order to maintain strong diplomatic and economic relations, or that Romero wanted to "leave his mark on history" by breaking with the pre-existing political system and establishing a new one.

In May 1927, Romero proposed a constitutional amendment to implement a secret ballot, but the amendment was never approved. Romero dissolved the National Democratic Party on 6 September 1927 and prohibited anyone from claiming to be a member of the party in the December 1927 municipal elections, the first elections held during his presidency. In an interview ahead of the election, Mendoza said that the government "does not favor any candidates anywhere; their government's interest is simply in guaranteeing liberty". The election resulted in many former PND affiliates retaining power, but several municipalities did elect new candidates who were not affiliated with the PND. The following month, the country held legislative elections in which government-chosen candidates won every seat. Ching theorized that Romero did this to disallow his political opponents to potentially gain the power to impeach him. The 1929 municipal elections saw more candidates who were never affiliated with the PND win seats, but many former PND candidates still held on to power.

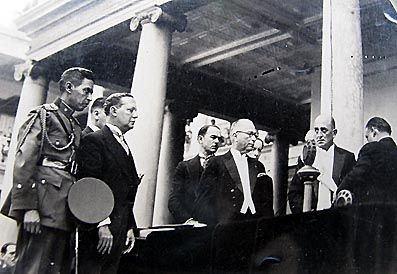
Romero (third from the right) at Arturo Araujo's (second from the right) 1931 presidential inauguration

In 1930, Romero announced that he would allow for new political parties to exist on the condition that they did not seek to overthrow the government. Six political parties were soon formed. Although Romero granted greater political freedoms, left-wing ideals were still prohibited to the extent that the Communist Party of El Salvador (PCES) had to be formed in secret. From November 1930 to February 1931, around 1,200 people were imprisoned for left-wing political activity. Among those arrested was revolutionary Farabundo Martí whom Romero later had exiled from the country in December 1930.

Ahead of the 1931 presidential election, Romero did not select a presidential successor, (Note: While Romero did not choose a presidential successor, American author Thomas P. Anderson speculated that Romero chose to allow an open competition for the 1931 presidential election as he could not choose a successor between reformers Enrique Córdova and Miguel Tomás Molina.) and as a result, several candidates participated in the election. The Diario del Salvador newspaper praised Romero's decision to not handpick a successor, writing that he had "broken forever with the traditions of the past" and referred to him as "El Salvador's greatest president". Among the candidates were Araujo and Zárate. Romero instructed polling officials to be impartial when counting votes. Araujo won the election with 46.7 percent of the vote in what historians considered to be the most free and fair election in Salvadoran history up to that point.

Romero left office on 1 March 1931 and was succeeded by Araujo.

== Personal life ==
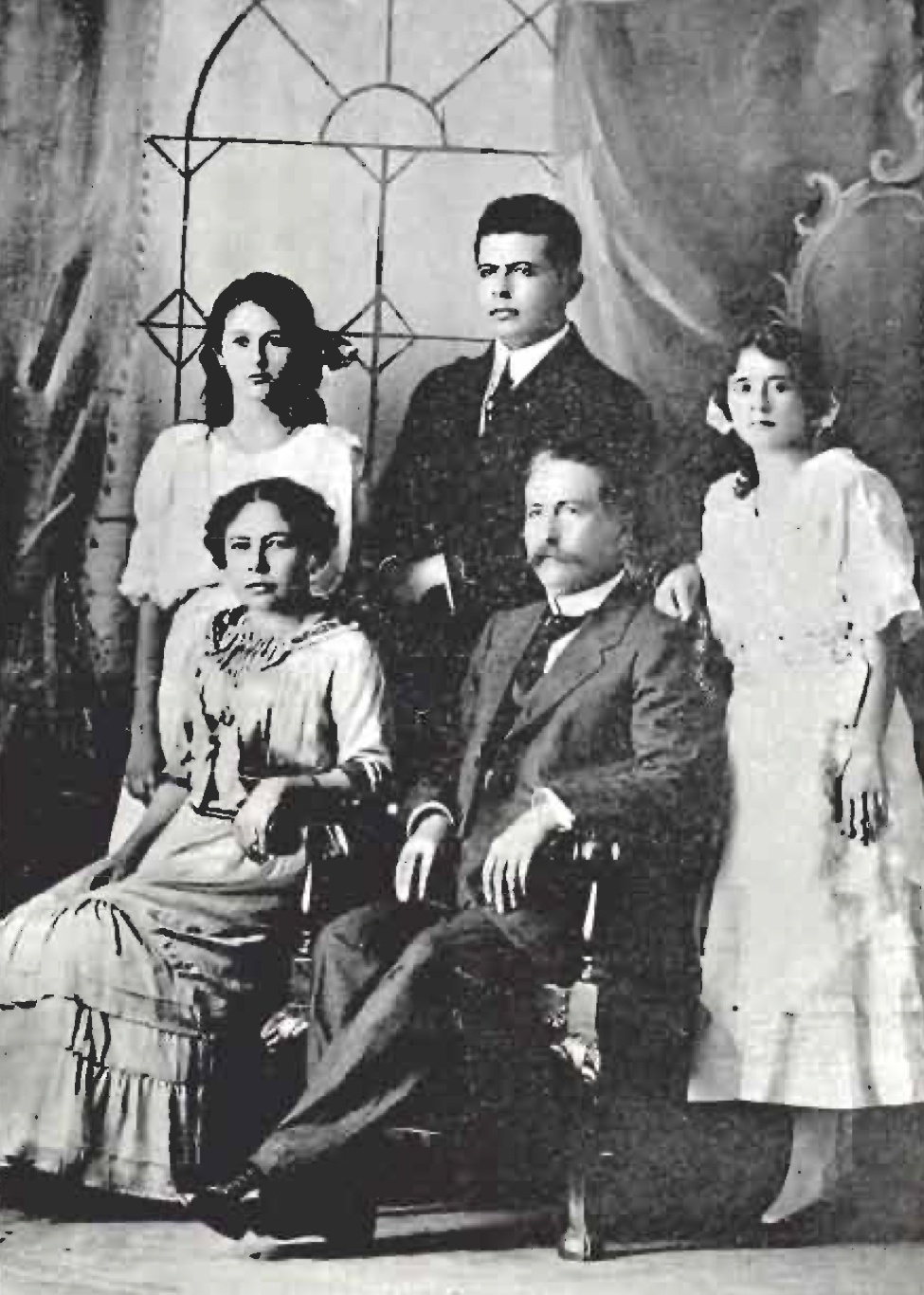
Romero with his family (c. 1916)

Romero married Amparo Molina in 1891. The couple had three children including Pío Romero Bosque Molina and two daughters. While Romero was president, his wife invited San Salvador's poor into the Presidential Palace to celebrate his birthday.

== Later life and death ==
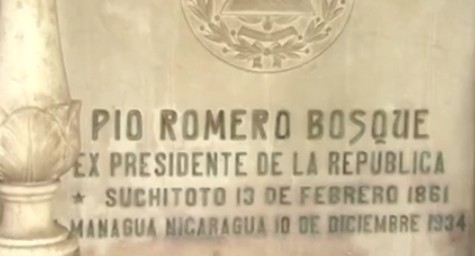
Romero's grave in the Cemetery of Distinguished Citizens in San Salvador

In December 1931, the Salvadoran military overthrew Araujo's government and installed his vice president, Brigadier General Maximiliano Hernández Martínez, as the country's provisional president. Romero attempted to organize a political campaign to defeat Martínez in the 1935 presidential election, but Romero fled the country in December 1933 for exile in Costa Rica after Martínez himself accused Romero of organizing a "communist sedition". Romero had also come under heavy monitoring by the orejas informant network. In a February 1934 interview with a U.S. military attaché, Romero denied plotting against Martínez.

Romero died in Nicaragua on 10 December 1935. (Note: According to Héctor Lindo Fuentes, Erik K. Ching, and Rafael A. Lara Martínez, Bosque died in Costa Rica in 1934.) Martínez's government eventually reversed Romero's democratic reforms and El Salvador came under undemocratic military rule for the next five decades.

== Legacy ==
British author Alastair White described Romero's presidency as "the beginning of a period of transition ending with the suppression of the rebellion of 1932, after which the new order of things was apparent". American author Thomas P. Anderson wrote that Romero was remembered in El Salvador as "a kind of Salvadoran Good King Wenceslaus" and described his presidency as a "golden age in the country's troubled history". Conversely, Salvadoran conservative editorialist Juan Ulloa blamed Romero's democratic reforms as directly causing La Matanza, a 1932 rebellion led by Martí and the PCES followed up by the mass killings of up to 40,000 people. Ulloa also accused Romero of "knowing its [communist] leaders" ("conoció sus lideres [comunistas]").

== Electoral history ==
Year	Office	Type	Party	Main opponent	Party	Votes for Romero				Result	Swing	Ref.
Year	Office	Type	Party	Main opponent	Party	Total	%	P.	±%	Result	Swing	Ref.
1919	President of El Salvador	General	PDN	Jorge Meléndez	PDN	4,370	2.54	2nd	N/A	Lost	Hold	
1927	President of El Salvador	General	PDN	Unopposed		?	100.00	1st	+97.46	Won	Hold	

== Notes ==
Political offices
Preceded by José Rosa Pacas	Minister of Governance, Development, and Public Instruction; 1903–1907	Succeeded by Isidro Paredes
Preceded by Víctor Jerez	President of the Supreme Court of Justice; 1914–1919	Succeeded by Francisco Martínez Suárez
Preceded by Alfonso Quiñónez Molina	Minister of War, the Navy, and Aviation; 1914–1915	Succeeded by Luis Alonso Barahona
Preceded by Enrique Córdova	Minister of War, the Navy, and Aviation; 1919–1927	Succeeded by Alberto Gómez Zárate
Preceded by Alfonso Quiñónez Molina	Vice President of El Salvador; 1923–1927	Succeeded by Gustavo Vides
Preceded by Alfonso Quiñónez Molina	President of El Salvador; 1927–1931	Succeeded by Arturo Araujo
