= David Munguía Payés =

Minister of Defense of El Salvador

Divisional General David Munguía Payés
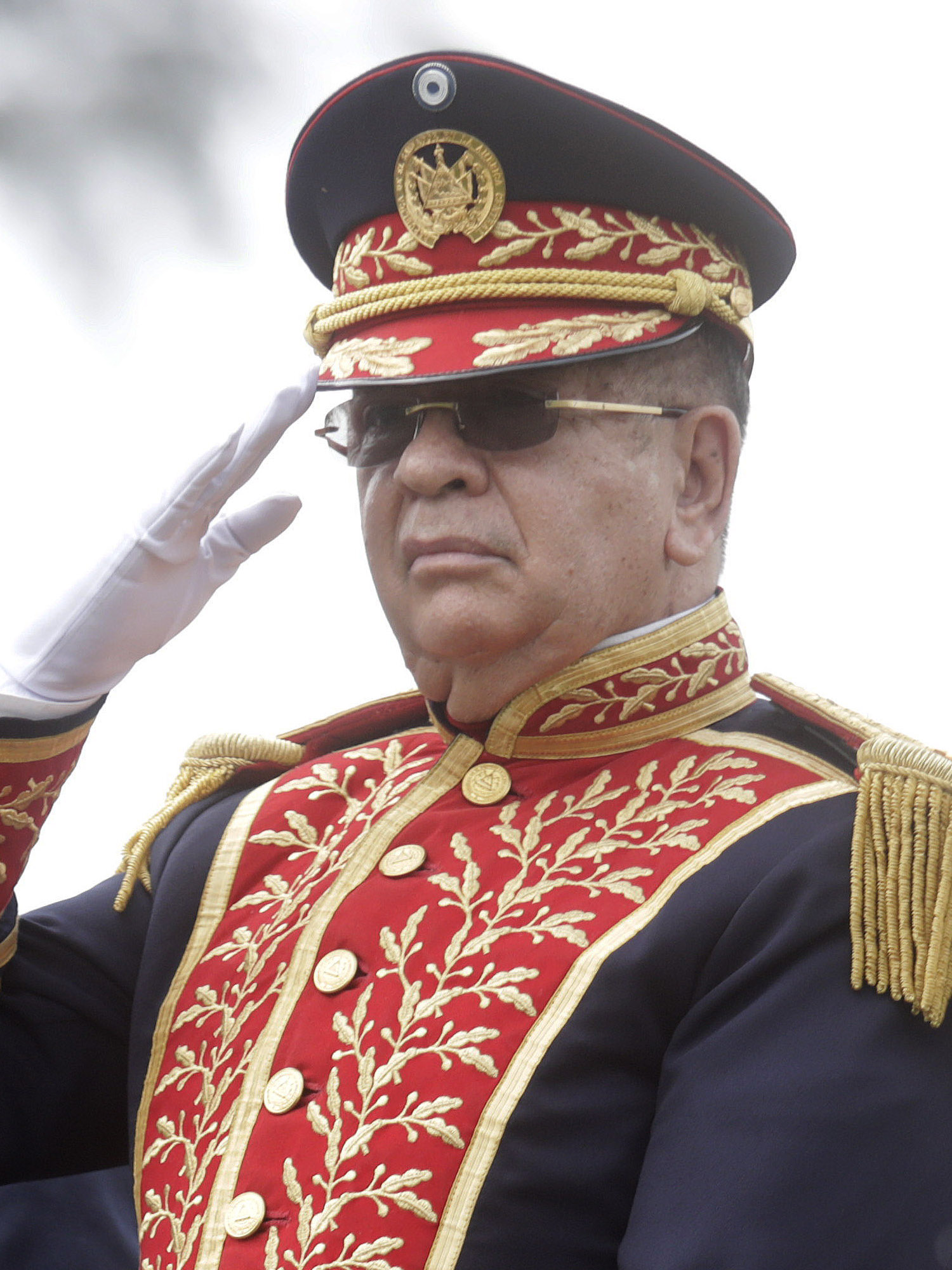
- Munguía Payés in 2019

46th & 48th Minister of National Defense of El Salvador
- In office 12 July 2013 – 1 June 2019
- President: Mauricio Funes; Salvador Sánchez Cerén
- Preceded by: Atilio Benítez
- Succeeded by: René Merino Monroy
- In office 1 June 2009 – 23 November 2011
- President: Mauricio Funes
- Preceded by: Jorge Alberto Molina
- Succeeded by: Atilio Benítez

3rd Minister of Justice and Public Security of El Salvador
- In office 23 November 2011 – 17 May 2013
- President: Mauricio Funes
- Preceded by: Manuel Melgar
- Succeeded by: Ricardo Perdomo

Personal details
- Born: El Salvador
- Occupation: Military officer

Military service
- Allegiance: El Salvador
- Branch/service: Salvadoran Army
- Years of service: ?–2019
- Rank: Divisional general

David Victoriano Munguía Payés is a former Salvadoran Army general who served as Minister of National Defense of El Salvador from 2009 to 2011 and again from 2013 to 2019.

== Biography ==
David Victoriano Munguía Payés was the Director of the Captain General Gerardo Barrios Military School from 1996 to 1997.

He was appointed as Minister of National Defense of El Salvador on 1 June 2009 by President Mauricio Funes. He served until 23 November 2011 and replaced by Atilio Benítez, but he was reinstated to the position on 12 July 2013. He left office on 1 June 2019 and was succeeded by René Merino Monroy.

Munguía Payés was arrested on 23 July 2020 for allegedly negotiating a truce with the prominent gangs Mara Salvatrucha (MS-13) and 18th Street gang (Barrio 18) during his term. A judge later ordered him to be placed under house arrest. In October 2020, eight properties worth 1.4 million dollars were confiscated from Munguía Payés by the Salvadoran government due to tax investigations indicating that they may have been attained through illegal activities.

His criminal trial began on 26 April 2023. On 29 May 2023, he was sentenced to 18 years imprisonment (8 years for illicit association, 6 years for failure to perform his duties, and 4 years for committing arbitrary actions). On 17 June 2023, the office of the attorney general began proceedings to charge Munguía for alleged the money laundering and illicit enrichment of US$1,147,650 during Funes' presidency. On 24 August 2023, the office of the attorney general ordered Munguía Payés to pay US$462,732.81 to the state.

== See also ==
- Cabinet of Salvador Sánchez Cerén

Political offices
Preceded by Jorge Alberto Molina	Minister of National Defense of El Salvador; 2009–2011	Succeeded by Atilio Benítez
Preceded by Manuel Melgar	Minister of Justice and Public Security of El Salvador; 2011–2013	Succeeded by Ricardo Perdomo
Preceded by Atilio Benítez	Minister of National Defense of El Salvador; 2013–2019	Succeeded by René Merino Monroy
