= President of the Supreme Court of Justice of El Salvador =

Salvadoran judicial office

- Incumbent; Henry Alexander Mejía since 24 September 2024
- Supreme Court of Justice of El Salvador
- Member of: Constitutional Court
- Formation: 1824
- First holder: Joaquín Durán y Aguilar

The president of the Supreme Court of Justice of El Salvador is the chief magistrate of the Supreme Court of Justice of El Salvador. The president of the Supreme Court of Justice is also the president of the court's Constitutional Chamber. Since 24 September 2024, Henry Alexander Mejía has been the president.

== List of presidents ==
The following is a list of presidents of the Supreme Court of Justice.

No.	President	Term start	Term end
1	Joaquín Durán y Aguilar	1824	1827
2	José María Rosa	1827	1829
3	José Leandor Vasconcelos	1829	1832
4	Ciriaco Villacorta	1832	1834
5	José Miguel Montoya	1834	1835
6	Ciriaco Villacorta	1835	1836
7	José Félix Quirós	1836	1837
8	Eustaquio Cuéllar	1837	1840
9	Nicolás Espinoza	1840	1841
10	Anselmo Paiz	1841	1847
11	Eustaquio Cuéllar	1847	1849
12	José Miguel Montoya	1849	1851
13	José Damián Villacorta	1851	1857
14	Cruz Ulloa	1857	1858
15	Anselmo Paiz	1858	1859
16	Francisco Aguilar	1859	1860
17	Anselmo Paiz	1860	1862
18	José Ángel Quirós	1862	1863
19	Miguel Suárez	1863	1864
20	Juan Delgado	1864	1865
21	José Trigueros	1865	1866
22	Nicolás Peña	1866	1870
23	José Trigueros	1870	1871
24	Cruz Ulloa	1871	1872
25	José Trigueros	1872	1886
26	Antonio Ruiz	1886	1889
27	Hermógenes Alvarado Gómez	1889	1891
28	Alberto Mena	1891	1893
29	Héctor David Castro	1893	1895
30	Emeterio Salazar	1895	1896
31	Jesús Velasco	1896	1897
32	Hermógenes Alvarado Gómez	1897	1899
33	Héctor David Castro	1899	1903
34	Francisco Martínez Suárez	1903	1905
35	Héctor David Castro	1905	1906
36	Ricardo Moreira	1906	1907
37	Esteban Castro	1907	1911
38	Federico Penado	1911	1913
39	Víctor Jerez	1913	1914
40	Pío Romero Bosque	1914	1919
41	Francisco Martínez Suárez	1919	1926
42	Víctor Jerez	1926	1927
43	Cayetano Ochoa	1927	1931
44	Manuel Vicente Mendoza	1931	1932
45	Alberto Gómez Zárate	1932	May 1944
46	Miguel Tomás Molina	26 May 1944	17 November 1944
47	Félix Antonio Gómez	17 November 1944	1946
48	Arturo Argüello Loucel	1946	1948
49	Sarbelio Navarrete	1948	1950
50	Humberto Costa	1950	1956
51	Enrique Antonio Porras	1956	1959
52	Juan Benjamín Escobar	1959	1960
53	Tulio Sagastume Duarte	1960	25 January 1961
54	Carlos Hayem	25 January 1961	25 January 1962
55	José Vicente Vilanova	25 January 1962	1968
56	Alfredo Martínez Moreno	1968	1970
57	Francisco Armando Arias	1970	1976
58	Rogelio Alfredo Chávez	1976	15 October 1979
59	Miguel Antonio Granillo	1979	1981
60	Leonel Carías Delgado	1981	1982
61	Arturo Zeledón Castrillo	1982	1984
62	Francisco José Guerrero	1984	28 November 1989
63	Gabriel Mauricio Gutiérrez Castro	1989	1994
64	José Domingo Méndez	1994	1997
65	Jorge Eduardo Tenorio	1997	2000
66	Agustín García Calderón	2000	2009
67	José Belarmino Jaime	2009	2012
68	José Salomón Padilla	2012	2013
69	Florentín Meléndez	2013	31 July 2014
70	Óscar Armando Pineda Navas	31 July 2014	1 May 2021
71	Óscar Alberto López Jerez	3 May 2021	24 September 2024
72	Henry Alexander Mejía	24 September 2024	Incumbent
