= José Belarmino Jaime =

Salvadorian judge

José Belarmino Jaime is a Savladoran former judge who served as the president of the Supreme Court of Justice of El Salvador from 2009 to 2012. He was elected by the national legislative assembly in 2009.
