= List of museums in El Salvador =

This is a list of museums in El Salvador.

== List ==
- The Aja Museum
- Casa Blanca Museum
- Joya de Cerén Museum
- Military Museum of the Armed Forces of El Salvador
- Museum of Popular Art
- Museum of Salvadoran Television and Film
- Museum of the City
- Museum of the Revolution
- Museum of the Sculptor Enrique Salaverría
- Museum of the Word and the Image
- Railroad Museum de El Salvador
- Regional Museum of the East
- Regional Museum of the West
- Salvadoran Museum of Art
- San Andrés Museum
- Tazumal Museum
