= Jorge Alberto Molina =

Minister of Defense of El Salvador

Divisional General Jorge Alberto Molina

Minister of National Defense of El Salvador
- In office 1 January 2009 – 1 June 2009
- President: Antonio Saca
- Preceded by: Otto Alejandro Romero Orellana
- Succeeded by: David Munguía Payés

Personal details
- Born: 1956 (age 69–70) San Salvador, El Salvador
- Party: Independent
- Education: Captain General Gerardo Barrios Military School
- Profession: Military

Military service
- Allegiance: El Salvador
- Branch/service: Salvadoran Army
- Years of service: 1980–2009
- Rank: Divisional general
- Commands: 3rd Military Detachment
- Battles/wars: Salvadoran Civil War

Jorge Alberto Molina Contreras (born 1956) is a retired Salvadoran military officer who served as Minister of National Defense of El Salvador from 1 January 2009 to 1 June 2009 during the last six months of the presidency of Antonio Saca.
