= Edgardo Carlos Suárez Mallagray =

Salvadordan diplomat

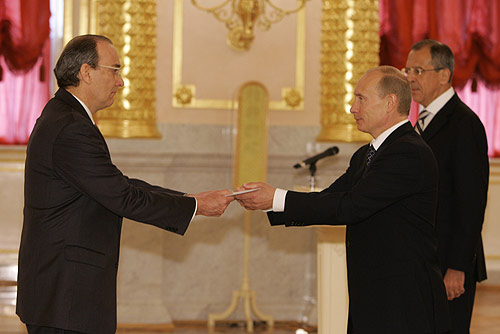
Suárez Mallagray presenting his credentials to Vladimir Putin in July 2007.

Edgardo Carlos Suárez Mallagray is a Salvadoran diplomat who was the ambassador of El Salvador to Russia, presenting his credentials to Russian president Vladimir Putin on 27 July 2007.
