= Ministry of National Defense (El Salvador) =

- Ministerio de la Defensa Nacional
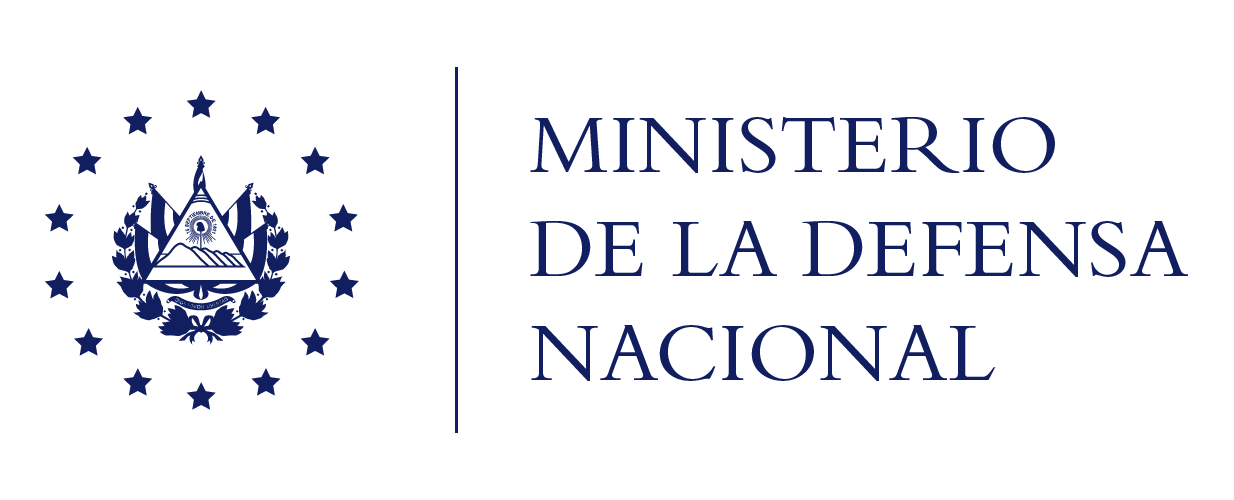

Agency overview
- Formed: 29 March 1856
- Jurisdiction: Government of El Salvador
- Headquarters: General Staff, Alameda Manuel Enrique Araujo, San Salvador, El Salvador
- Minister responsible: Admiral René Merino Monroy, Minister of National Defense
- Website: fuerzaarmada.mil.sv

The Ministry of National Defense (Spanish: Ministerio de la Defensa Nacional) is a government ministry of El Salvador. It is the government institution responsible for national defense and the governance of the Armed Forces of El Salvador.

== History ==
In the then State of El Salvador of the Federal Republic of Central America, it wasn't until 8 June 1825 that an institution in charge of both the military and administrative aspects of the government, the Ministry of Finance and War, was created. On February 12, 1858, during the presidency of Miguel Santín del Castillo, it was decided to separate the undersecretariats of the General Ministry and convert them into their own ministries or secretariats, one of them being the Ministry of Finance and War.

On 2 February 1884, President Rafael Zaldívar decided to create the Ministry of War and Development, with this institution was once again combined with the Ministry of Finance into the "Secretariat of Finance, Public Credit, War and Navy" after Zaldívar was removed from office. It was in 1900, during the presidency of General Tomás Regalado, that the Ministry of War was created, with General Fernando Figueroa as its first head. Its original full name was the Ministry of War and Navy; and it retained this name until 24 March 1927, when it was renamed the Ministry of War, Navy, and Aviation. In March 1939, under the administration of Maximiliano Hernández Martínez, it became known as the Ministry of Defense.

At that time, and until the signing of the Chapultepec Peace Accords, it was responsible for national defense and public security vis-a-vis the military and the National Police of El Salvador. Following the accords, its name became the Ministry of National Defense, which it retains to this day.

== See also ==
- Armed Forces of El Salvador
- Politics of El Salvador
