= René Emilio Ponce =

Salvadoran politician and military officer

Brigadier General René Emilio Ponce
- Born: René Emilio Ponce Torres; 27 April 1947; Sensuntepeque, El Salvador
- Died: 2 May 2011 (aged 64); San Salvador, El Salvador
- Military career
- Allegiance: El Salvador
- Branch: Salvadoran Army
- Service years: 1966–1993
- Rank: Brigadier general
- Conflicts: Salvadoran Civil War

21st Minister of National Defense
- In office August 1990 – June 1993
- Preceded by: Rafael Humberto Larios López
- Succeeded by: Humberto Corado Figueroa

Personal details
- Education: Captain General Gerardo Barrios Military School
- Occupation: Military officer

René Emilio Ponce Torres (27 April 1947 – 2 May 2011) was a senior military officer in the Salvadoran Army during the nation's civil war, and minister of defense from 1990 to 1993. He was a member of La Tandona, the class of 1966 at the Captain General Gerardo Barrios Military School. As head of the army's joint chiefs of staff he was linked, according to a report published by a Truth Commission, to the 1989 murders of Jesuits in El Salvador, although no judicial authority has rendered a decision finding him guilty. It is worth to note that the 1992 Peace Accords, which ended the armed conflict, explicitly deprived, the Truth Commission's Report, of any value as trial evidence. Ponce died on 2 May 2011 at a military hospital in San Salvador, due to complications arising from a ruptured abdominal aortic aneurysm. Ponce's signature can be seen at the end of the document containing the 1992 Peace Accords, which ended El Salvador's civil war.
