= Agustín García Calderón =

Salvadoran judge

Agustín García Calderón (born 14 August 1948 in Santa Ana, El Salvador) is a Salvadoran former judge who was the president of the Supreme Court of Justice of El Salvador from 2000 to 2009.
