= Jorge Molina (artist) =

Spanish-Canadian artist, actor and filmmaker

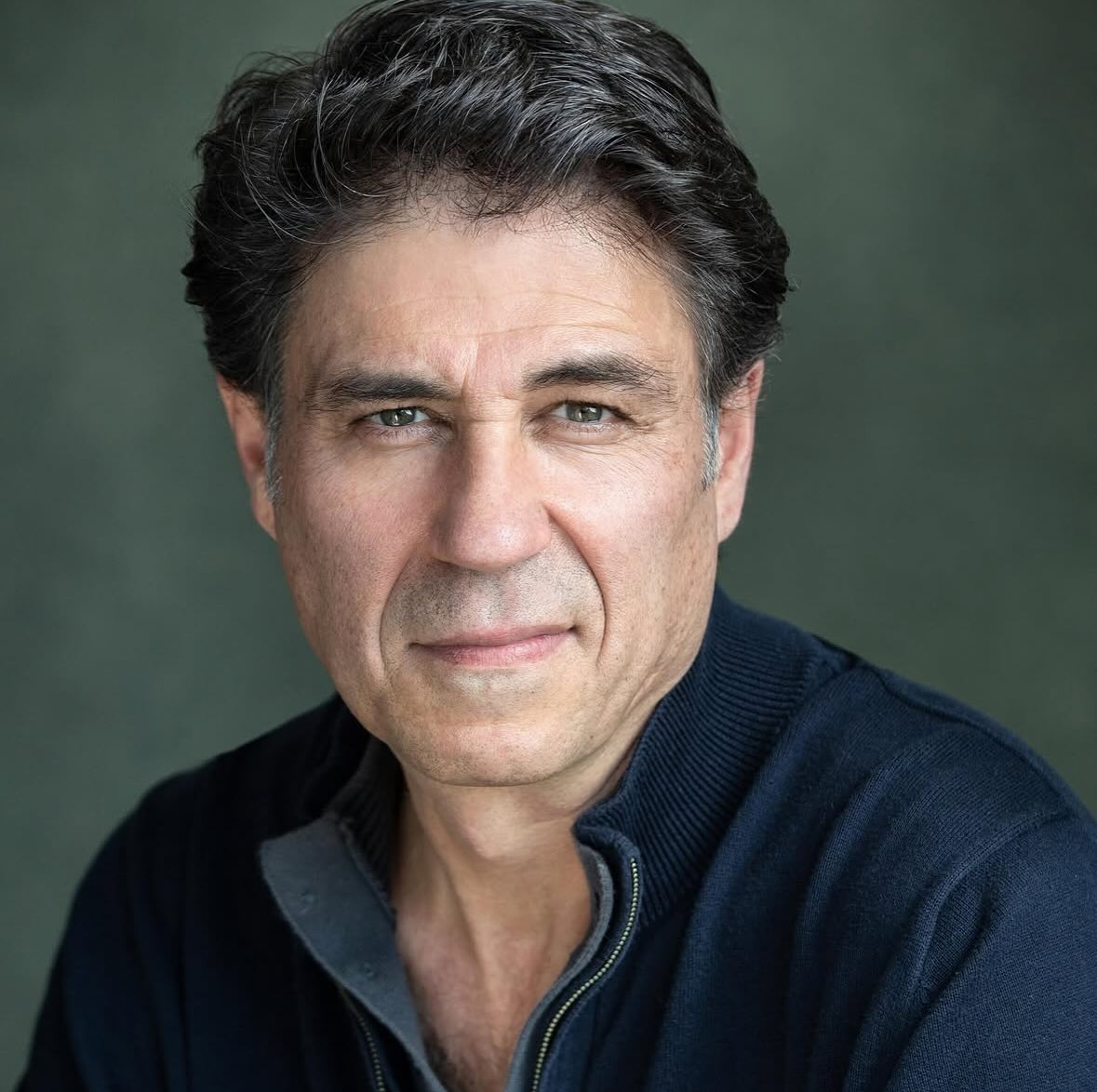
- Born: Barcelona, Spain
- Known for: Artist, Actor, Filmmaker
- Notable work: The 416 Project
- Website: Official website

Jorge Molina is a Canadian artist, actor, and filmmaker.

== Early life and education ==
Jorge Molina was born in Barcelona, Spain, and grew up in Edmonton, Canada, where he studied fine art, graphic and environmental design at MacEwan University. He also studied acting with Theatre Alberta.

== Career ==
=== Art ===
In 2016 Molina created The 416 Project. He installed 416 unique canvases across 35 neighbourhoods in Toronto. Each work was hung on wooden utility poles, making the entire city an art gallery. Each 6” x 6” canvas was an image of its surroundings.

Molina's art has been exhibited at the Sunnyside Beach Juried Art Show and he also had a solo exhibit through the Toronto Public Library's Community Artist program. His fine art work focuses primarily in abstract expressionist pieces and working in large scale.

=== Acting ===
Known for his appearances in Doc, Accused, Cardinal, and Suits, Molina has been acting in television and film for over 25 years.

Molina was also nominated for a DORA Award "Outstanding Performance Ensemble" playing Gil Schwartz in the production of "Hogtown: The Immersive Experience".

=== Filmmaking ===
Currently based in Toronto, Molina has his own production company, Nostra Casa Films. His film "Jimmy & Della" was an official selection at film festivals throughout North America and Europe; "Zoey's Hill" received the Award of Excellence "Children/Family Programming" from the Best Shorts Competition in La Jolla, California. His latest project, "A Canadian Actor", was awarded Best Unproduced Feature Script by the Montreal Independent Film Festival.

As of 2025 Molina also produces and co-hosts the online series SNAK the Show.
