= 1931 Salvadoran legislative election =

← 1930	11–13 January 1931	1932 →
- All 42 seats in the Legislative Assembly; 22 seats needed for a majority

Legislative elections were held in El Salvador from 11 to 13 January 1931. The election occurred with concurrent presidential elections.

== Results ==
=== Elected members ===
The following people were elected to the Legislative Assembly of El Salvador. They assumed office on 12 February 1931 and voted to elect Arturo Araujo as El Salvador's next president.

Deputy	Department	Office(s)
Julio Contreras	Ahuachapán	
Flavio Jiménez	Ahuachapán	
Pedro Menéndez	Ahuachapán	
Vicente Navarette	Cabañas	
Joaquín Novoa	Cabañas	
Luis Torres	Cabañas	
Marco Antonio Artiga	Chalatenango	
Francisco Durán	Chalatenango	
Abel Tobías	Chalatenango	
José Maximiliano Olano	Cuscatlán	President
Francisco Orellana Valdéz	Cuscatlán	
Francisco Pascal Castro	Cuscatlán	
Alberto Gallardo Parker	La Libertad	
Carlos Guirola	La Libertad	Vice President
Vicente Sol	La Libertad	
Armando Chacón	La Paz	
Rafael Díaz	La Paz	First Secretary
José Villacorta	La Paz	
Héctor Galindo García	La Unión	
Neftalí Girón	La Unión	
Guillermo Langlois	La Unión	
Marco Álvarez	Morazán	
José Lagos	Morazán	
Alfredo Pineda	Morazán	
Pedro Álvarez	San Miguel	
Paúl Avilés Herrera	San Miguel	
Salvador David Moreno	San Miguel	
Blas Cantissano	San Salvador	
Carlos Medina	San Salvador	
José Mejía	San Salvador	
Gustavo Acevedo Aguilar	San Vicente	
Daniel Aguilar	San Vicente	
Isabel Vaquerano	San Vicente	
Nicolás Cabezas Duarte	Santa Ana	
José Cipriano Castro	Santa Ana	
Francisco Espinoza	Santa Ana	
Guillermo Campo	Sonsonate	
Secundio Mata	Sonsonate	
Justo Rufino Alfaro	Sonsonate	
Alberto Masferrer	Usulután	
Antonio Rafael Méndez	Usulután	
Luciano Zacapa	Usulután	
