= Salvadoran Laborist Party =

Salvadoran political party

Salvadoran Laborist Party Partido Laborista Salvadoreña
- Abbreviation: PL
- Leader: Arturo Araujo
- Founded: Unknown
- Banned: December 1931
- Headquarters: San Salvador
- Ideology: Social democracy Land reform
- Political position: Center-left

The Salvadoran Laborist Party (Partido Laborista Salvadoreña) was a Salvadoran political party that existed until 1931.

The party was founded by Arturo Araujo. The party joined a coalition with Maximiliano Hernández Martínez's National Republican Party during the 1931 presidential election. The coalition failed to win a majority but Araujo was elected president by the Legislative Assembly.

The party dissolved following the 1931 Salvadoran coup d'état when all political parties were banned.

== Electoral history ==
=== Presidential elections ===
Election	Candidate	Votes	%	Result	Ref.
1919	Arturo Araujo	1,022	0.59%	Lost ✗	
1923	Did not participate				
1927	Did not participate				
1931	Arturo Araujo	106,777	46.65%	Elected ✓	

=== Legislative elections ===
Election	Votes	%	Position	Seats	+/–	Status in legislature
1931	Unknown	Unknown	Unknown	Unknown	New	Government

== See also ==
- National Republican Party (El Salvador)
