= Arturo Araujo =

President of El Salvador in 1931

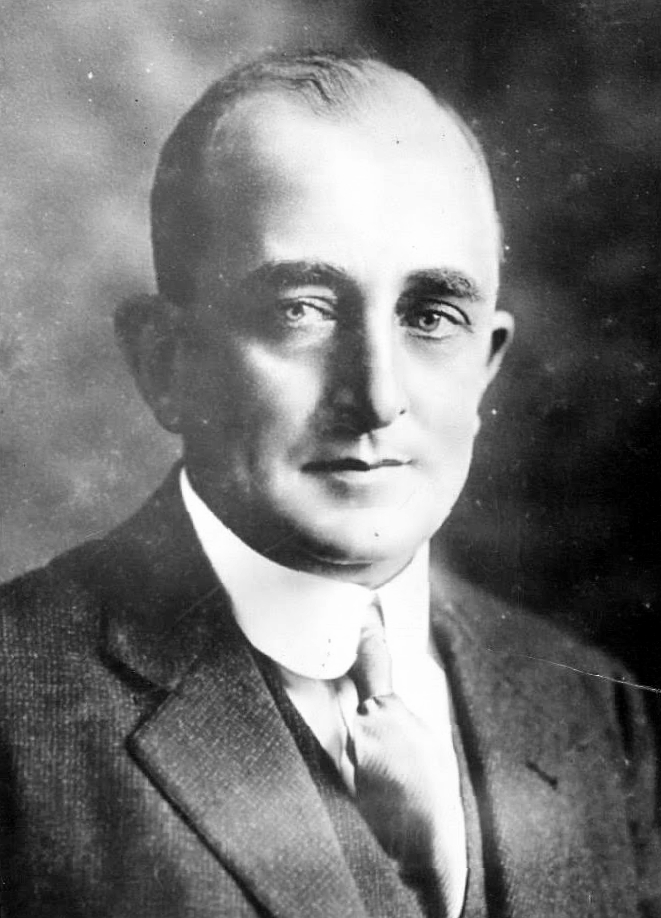
- Araujo in c. 1928

26th President of El Salvador
- In office 1 March 1931 – 2 December 1931
- Vice President: Maximiliano Hernández Martínez
- Preceded by: Pío Romero Bosque
- Succeeded by: Maximiliano Hernández Martínez (acting)

Personal details
- Born: 1878 Santa Tecla, El Salvador
- Died: 1 December 1967 (aged 88) San Salvador, El Salvador
- Party: Salvadoran Laborist Party
- Spouse(s): Dora Morton; Rosa Amelia Guzmán
- Children: 2
- Profession: Politician, engineer

Arturo Araujo Fajardo (1878 – 1 December 1967) was a Salvadoran politician and engineer who served as the 26th president of El Salvador from 1 March 1931 to 2 December 1931. He was overthrown in a military coup led by junior officers, and was forced to flee the country for Guatemala.

== Early life ==
Arturo Araujo was born in 1878 in Santa Tecla, El Salvador. His parents were Doctor Eugenio Araujo and Enriqueta Fajardo de Araujo. Araujo was a childhood friend of Alfonso Quiñónez Molina, another future president of El Salvador.

Araujo studied in Liverpool and obtained a degree in engineering. Through his studies in the United Kingdom, he became an admirer of the British Labour Party and its policies.

Araujo was a wealthy landowner from Armenia, a municipality in the Sonsonate department. Due to his admiration of British Labour policies, he developed a reputation for being generous to his workers, paying them twice the average wage and offering them housing and medical care. In 1921, the U.S. chargé d'affaires estimated that Araujo had spent $25,000 of his personal fortune on housing, medical care, and education for his employees, when the average Salvadoran salary was only 18¢ a day. In 1918, artisans in Armenia bestowed upon him the title of "Benefactor of the Workers".

== Early political career ==
=== 1919 election and 1920 invasion ===
Araujo founded the Salvadoran Laborist Party. He announced that he would seek election as president of El Salvador during the 1919 presidential election. Incumbent provisional president Alfonso Quiñónez Molina of the National Democratic Party did not want Araujo to win and rigged the election to ensure that his preferred candidate, Jorge Meléndez (his brother-in-law), would in the election. Government officials went to polling stations to instruct them to cast votes in favor of Meléndez first and Pío Romero Bosque (one of Quiñónez's allies) second. In the final results, Araujo came in third place with 1,022 votes; Romero came in second with 4,370 votes and subsequently became minister of war, while Meléndez came in first with 166,441 votes, becoming president.

After Araujo's defeat, he began plotting to overthrow Meléndez's government. In March 1920, the government discovered Araujo's plot and attempted to arrest him at this hacienda in Armenia. A shootout ensued between the National Guard and Araujo's supporters, and Araujo fled the country for Honduras. While in exile, he raised an army numbering between 300 and 1,000 men, and in May 1920, he launched an invasion into northern El Salvador. His army attacked two military outposts in Arcatao in the Chalatenango department, but the Salvadoran Army responded quickly and forces Araujo and his army to flee back to Honduras. He remained in exile until 1923 when Quiñónez, who had since become president, allowed Araujo to return to Armenia.

=== 1931 presidential election ===
In 1927, Romero became president. Although he was expected to continue the National Democratic Party's political dynasty, he implemented political reforms in an attempt to turn El Salvador into a democracy with free and fair elections.

During the 1931 presidential election, Araujo came in first place with 46.65 percent of the vote (a total of 106,777 votes). Election observers believed that the election was free and fair. Enrique Córdova believed that Romero may have rigged the election in favor of Araujo, but he did accept that the election was "democratic, instructive, and realized in peace".

== Presidency ==
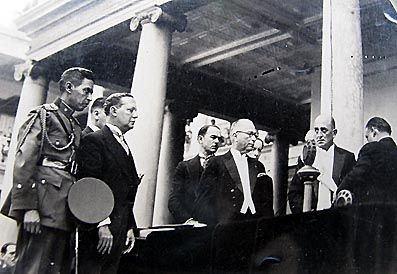
Araujo's inauguration as president

Araujo assumed office on 1 March 1931; Brigadier General Maximiliano Hernández Martínez was his vice president. He appointed the following cabinet ministers: Doctor Héctor David Castro as minister of foreign relations, justice, public instruction, and charity; Doctor Joaquín Novoa as minister of government, promotion, agriculture, labor, and sanitation; Doctor Francisco José Espinosa as minister of finance, public credit, industry, and commerce, and Martínez as minister of war, the navy, and aviation.

Alberto Masferrer had proposed a nine-point reform program of the country, based on which the president promised food, cloth, work and housing to every Salvadoran. However, government corruption and the Great Depression created disadvantage for the president.

Soon he was overthrown in a military coup, and with his overthrow began five decades of military rule in the country.

== Personal life ==
Araujo married twice. First, he married Dora Morton whom he met while studying in the United Kingdom; the couple had one daughter, Helen. Then, he married Rosa Amelia Guzmán; the couple had one son, Armando.

As a condition for becoming Araujo's vice president, Martínez married Araujo's long-time mistress, Concepción "Concha" Monteagudo. Araujo was the best man at their wedding.

== Death ==
Araujo died on 1 December 1967 at the age of 88 at the Military Hospital of San Salvador.

== Electoral history ==
Year	Office	Type	Party	Main opponent	Party	Votes for Araujo				Result	Swing	Ref.
Year	Office	Type	Party	Main opponent	Party	Total	%	P.	±%	Result	Swing	Ref.
1919	President of El Salvador	General	Laborist	Jorge Meléndez	PDN	1,022	0.59	3rd	N/A	Lost	Hold	
1931	President of El Salvador	General	Laborist	Alberto Gómez Zárate	PAP	106,777	46.65	1st	+46.06	Runoff		
1931	President of El Salvador	Indirect	Laborist	Alberto Gómez Zárate	PAP	42	100.00	1st	N/A	Won	Gain	

Political offices
Preceded by Pío Romero Bosque	President of El Salvador; 1931	Succeeded by Maximiliano Hernández Martínez (acting)
