= 2026 in El Salvador =

- Decades: 2000s; 2010s; 2020s
- See also: Other events of 2026; Timeline of Salvadoran history

Events in the year 2026 in El Salvador.

== Incumbents ==
- President: Nayib Bukele
- Vice President: Félix Ulloa

== Events ==
=== February ===
- 15 February – The Navy of El Salvador announces the seizure of 6.6 tonnes of cocaine and the arrest of 10 people from the Tanzania-flagged vessel FMS Eagle, in the largest drug bust in Salvadoran history.

=== March ===
- 13 March – El Salvador and the United States sign Agreement 123 to cooperate on the opening of a nuclear power plant in El Salvador.
- 16 March – Vamos announces it will not nominate a presidential candidate in the 2027 presidential election.
- 17 March – The Legislative Assembly of El Salvador approves a constitutional amendment to allow the imposition of life imprisonment upon individuals convicted of murder, rape, or terrorism.

=== April ===
- 15 April – President Bukele signs into law the constitutional amendments approved by the Legislative Assembly in March.

=== July ===
- 24 July – The United States imposes a 10% tariff on El Salvador, citing the presence of alleged forced labor in the supply chain.

=== October ===
- 21 October – El Salvador launches a military intervention in Haiti following the abduction of four Salvadoran nationals by gangs.

== Holidays ==
- 1 January — New Year's Day
- 2 April – Maundy Thursday
- 3 April – Good Friday
- 4 April – Easter Saturday
- 1 May – Labour Day
- 10 May – Mother's Day
- 17 June – Father's Day
- 6 August – Feast of San Salvador
- 15 September – Independence Day
- 2 November – All Saints' Day
- 25 December – Christmas Day

== Deaths ==
- 5 October – William Osorio, 55, footballer (FAS, Isidro Metapán, national team).
- 25 October – Komanche, 30, content creator and broadcaster.
