= 2025 in El Salvador =

- Decades: 2000s; 2010s; 2020s
- See also: Other events of 2025; Timeline of Salvadoran history

Events in the year 2025 in El Salvador.

== Incumbents ==
- President: Nayib Bukele
- Vice President: Félix Ulloa

== Events ==
=== January ===
- 5 January – A magnitude 6.2 earthquake hits off the coast of La Paz Department, injuring two people and damaging 10 homes.

=== February ===
- 3 February – El Salvador and the United States reach an agreement allowing for the incarceration of migrants and imprisoned US citizens in Salvadoran prisons.
- 4 February – A Salvadoran military contingent arrives in Haiti to assist in the UN-backed security mission there.
- 19 February – The United States designates MS-13 as a terrorist organization.
- 20 February – Canada designates MS-13 as a terrorist organization.

=== April ===
- 17 April – U.S. Senator Chris Van Hollen (D-MD) meets with Kilmar Abrego Garcia in El Salvador to push for his release. The move comes hours after being previously denied a meeting with him.

=== May ===
- 18 May – Lawyer and human rights activist Ruth Eleonora López is arrested on charges of corruption when she was an adviser at the Supreme Electoral Court in 2014 to 2021.

=== June ===
- 3 June – A jury in Chalatenango convicts former Defense Minister José Guillermo García and two other army officers for the murder of four Dutch journalists during the Salvadoran Civil War in 1982 and sentences them to 15 years' imprisonment.

=== July ===
- 9 July – El Salvador recalls its ambassador to Mexico, Rosa Delmy Cañas, after Mexican authorities claim that it had intercepted an aircraft transporting 428 kilograms of cocaine that originated from El Salvador.
- 18 July – Ten Americans held in Venezuela are released as part of an exchange with the United States that also sees the release of 252 Venezuelans deported from the U.S. and detained at CECOT in El Salvador.
- 31 July – The Legislative Assembly of El Salvador approves amendments to the constitution abolishing presidential term limits, eliminating runoff voting, and increasing the presidential term's duration to six years.

=== August ===
- 15 August – The Legislative Assembly of El Salvador approves a bill extending detention for suspects in organized crime to up to 36 months.

=== September ===
- 9 September – Authorities seize packages containing 1.4 tons of cocaine found floating off the coast of El Cordoncillo.

=== December ===
- 21 December – The Attorney General's Office announces sentences of up to 1,335 years for 248 members of MS-13 who were convicted on at least 85 charges of homicide and disappearances.

== Holidays ==
- 1 January — New Year's Day
- 17 April – Maundy Thursday
- 18 April – Good Friday
- 19 April – Easter Saturday
- 1 May – Labour Day
- 10 May – Mother's Day
- 17 June – Father's Day
- 6 August – Feast of San Salvador
- 15 September – Independence Day
- 2 November – All Saints' Day
- 25 December – Christmas Day

== Deaths ==
- 21 January — Mauricio Funes, 65, president (2009–2014).
- 20 August — Enrique Borgo Bustamante, 96, vice president (1994–1999).
