= 2022 in El Salvador =

- Decades: 2000s; 2010s; 2020s
- See also: Other events of 2022; Timeline of Salvadoran history

Events in the year 2022 in El Salvador.

== Incumbents ==
- President: Nayib Bukele
- Vice President: Félix Ulloa

== Events ==
Ongoing — COVID-19 pandemic in El Salvador

- 27 March – El Salvador declares a state of emergency after 62 people were murdered in the country yesterday, making it the most violent 24-hour period since the end of the civil war in 1992.
- 16 April – President of El Salvador Nayib Bukele announces that 12,169 gang members have been arrested since the state of emergency began on March 27.
- 4 July – El Salvador suspends classes as Hurricane Bonnie passes through Central America. Deaths have been reported in Nicaragua and El Salvador.
- 15 September – Bukele announces that he intends to run for reelection in the 2024 Salvadoran presidential election.
- 22 September – Seven people are killed by landslides in El Salvador.

== Scheduled events ==
=== Holidays ===
- 10 April – 16 April — Holy Week
- 10 May – Mother's Day
- 17 June – Father's Day
- 4–6 August — August Festivals, including Feast of San Salvador
- 15 September – Independence Day, anniversary of the Act of Independence of Central America.
- 2 November – Day of the Dead

== Sports ==
- July - December: 2022–23 Primera División de El Salvador

== Deaths ==
- 29 May – Yanci Urbina, 58, politician.
- 14 June – Rodrigo Orlando Cabrera Cuéllar, 84, Roman Catholic prelate.
- 21 July – Gustavo López Davidson, 60–61, politician.
