= 2027 in El Salvador =

- Decades: 2000s; 2010s; 2020s
- See also: Other events of 2027; Timeline of Salvadoran history

Events in the year 2027 in El Salvador.

== Events ==
=== Scheduled ===
- 28 February – 2027 Salvadoran presidential and legislative election
- 3–11 July – 2027 FIBA Women's AmeriCup

== Holidays ==
- 1 January — New Year's Day
- 25 March – Maundy Thursday
- 26 March – Good Friday
- 27 March – Easter Saturday
- 1 May – Labour Day
- 10 May – Mother's Day
- 17 June – Father's Day
- 6 August – Feast of San Salvador
- 15 September – Independence Day
- 2 November – All Saints' Day
- 25 December – Christmas Day
