= 2019 in El Salvador =

- Decades: 1990s; 2000s; 2010s; 2020s
- See also: Other events of 2019; Timeline of Salvadoran history

Events of 2019 in El Salvador.

== Incumbents ==
- President: Salvador Sánchez Cerén (until 1 June), Nayib Bukele (from 1 June)
- Vice President: Óscar Ortiz (until 1 June), Félix Ulloa (from 1 June)

== Events ==
=== February ===
- 3 – 2019 Salvadoran presidential election
