= 2024 in El Salvador =

- Decades: 2000s; 2010s; 2020s
- See also: Other events of 2024; Timeline of Salvadoran history

Events in the year 2024 in El Salvador.

== Incumbents ==
- President: Nayib Bukele; Claudia Rodríguez de Guevara (acting, until 1 June 2024)
- Vice President: Félix Ulloa

== Events ==
=== January ===
- 6 January – Electronic voting for Salvadoran expatriates in the presidential and legislative elections begins.

=== February ===
- 4 February – 2024 Salvadoran presidential election: Salvadorans elect their president, vice president and the Legislative Assembly. Nayib Bukele is reelected as president.

=== March ===
- 3 March – 2024 Salvadoran legislative election (local offices).
- 24 March – President Nayib Bukele announces the beginning of a blockade of four municipalities in northern El Salvador, mobilizing 5,000 soldiers and 1,000 police officers to arrest suspected gang members.

=== May ===
- 31 May – Authorities announce the discovery of a plot to detonate bombs across the country coinciding with President Bukele's inauguration on 1 June. Former FMLN congressman José Santos Melara is arrested on suspicion of involvement.

=== June ===
- 1 June – Nayib Bukele is inaugurated as President for a second term.
- 10 June – Two people are killed in a landslide caused by heavy rains in Meanguera del Golfo.
- 17 June – Five people are killed in landslides in Tacuba.
- 21 June – The death toll from torrential rains in El Salvador increases to 19 people, including at least two children.

=== August ===
- 28 August – A magnitude 6.1 earthquake hits La Libertad Department, resulting in 50 people being injured in Juayúa after being stung by bees from a fallen beehive.

=== September ===
- 8 September – Mauricio Arriaza Chicas, the head of the National Civil Police is killed along with a fraud suspect and seven others in a helicopter crash near Pasaquina.
- 27 September – The US Peace Corps is deployed to El Salvador for the first time since being pulled out in 2016 due to gang violence.

=== October ===
- 28 October – A joint military-police operation involving 2,500 security personnel is launched to find suspected gang members in the 10 de Octubre neighborhood of San Salvador.
- 30 October – The Legislative Assembly of El Salvador approves a proposal to send soldiers to Haiti as part of the United Nations Multinational Security Support Mission against gangs.

=== December ===
- 20 December – The Inter-American Court of Human Rights finds the Salvadoran government responsible for committing obstetric violence, health violations and violating the physical integrity of a woman whom it denied abortion despite carrying a anencephalic fetus.

== Holidays ==
- 1 January — New Year's Day
- 28 March – Maundy Thursday
- 29 March – Good Friday
- 30 March – Easter Saturday
- 1 May – Labour Day
- 10 May – Mother's Day
- 17 June – Father's Day
- 6 August – Feast of San Salvador
- 15 September – Independence Day
- 2 November – All Saints' Day
- 25 December – Christmas Day
