= 2021 in El Salvador =

- Decades: 2000s; 2010s; 2020s
- See also: Other events of 2021; Timeline of Salvadoran history

Events in the year 2021 in El Salvador.

== Incumbents ==
- President: Nayib Bukele
- Vice President: Félix Ulloa

== Events ==
Ongoing — COVID-19 pandemic in El Salvador

- 14 January – Acting United States Attorney General Jeffrey Rosen announces terrorism charges against fourteen MS-13 leaders imprisoned in El Salvador.
- 18 January – Authorities said that money sent home by migrants reached a high of USD5.92 billion in 2020, 4.8% higher than in 2019. Such payments make up 23% of GDP, benefitting 360,000 households.
- 31 January
  - Doctors Without Borders (MSF) suspends operations after an ambulance is attacked by an armed group in Reparto Las Canas east of San Salvador.
  - Two people are killed, five are injured, and five are arrested when former members of the FMLN are attacked by security forces in San Salvador.
- 6 February – Robert Stryk and the Sonoran Policy Group continued working as a lobbyist in Washington for the Bukele government after the Bukele claimed he had annulled a $450,000 contract.
- 10 February – The opposition walks back a proposal to remove President Bukele from office weeks before the election.
- 28 February – 2021 Salvadoran legislative election: Preliminary results show Nayib Bukele ahead by a large margin.
- 8 March – 5,000 women march in San Salvador demanding decriminalization of abortion and an end to violence against women on International Women's Day.
- 29 March – President Nayib Bukele demands justice for Victoria Salazar, a Salvadoran immigrant murdered by police in Tulum, Quintana Roo, Mexico.
- 8 June – El Salvador becomes the first country in the world to adopt the Bitcoin as official currency. "The #BitcoinLaw has just been approved by a qualified majority" in the legislative assembly, President Nayib Bukele tweeted. "History!" The law took effect on 7 September.

== Scheduled events ==
=== Holidays ===
- 28 March–3 April — Holy Week
- 10 May – Mother's Day
- 17 June – Father's Day
- 4–6 August — August Festivals, including Feast of San Salvador
- 15 September – Independence Day, 200th anniversary of the Act of Independence of Central America.
- 2 November – Day of the Dead

== Sports ==
- 29 May to 6 June – Scheduled date for the 2021 ISA World Surfing Games to take place in El Salvador.
- 5 to 19 December – Scheduled date for the 2021 Central American Games, to be hosted in Santa Tecla, El Salvador.
- TBA – 2020–21 Primera División de El Salvador

== Deaths ==
- January 24 – Roberto Cañas López, 70, politician, guerrilla and academic, signant of Chapultepec Peace Accords.
- February 4 – Antonio Azúcar Hernández, 44, diplomat, consul in Tapachula, Chiapas, Mexico; COVID-19.
- March 19 – Katherine Díaz Hernández, 22, surfer; lightning strike.
- March 26 – Daniel Luna, 24, footballer (Luis Ángel Firpo), drowned.
- April 9 – Edwin E. Aguilar, 46, Salvadoran-born American animator (The Simpsons, Transformers, G.I. Joe); stroke.
