= 2023 in El Salvador =

- Decades: 2000s; 2010s; 2020s
- See also: Other events of 2023; Timeline of Salvadoran history

Events in the year 2023 in El Salvador.

== Incumbents ==
- President: Nayib Bukele; Claudia Rodríguez de Guevara (acting, from 1 December 2023)
- Vice President: Félix Ulloa

== Events ==
Ongoing — COVID-19 pandemic in El Salvador

- 31 January: The Terrorism Confinement Center was open to hold inmates.
- 6 June: The Legislative Assembly of El Salvador votes to reduce the number of legislative seats from 84 to 60 ahead of the 2024 general election.
- 30 November: The Legislative Assembly grants leaves of absence to Nayib Bukele and Félix Ulloa to focus on their 2024 re-election campaigns. Claudia Rodríguez de Guevara is selected as acting president beginning on 1 December.

=== Holidays ===
- 1 January — New Year's Day
- 10 May – Mother's Day
- 17 June – Father's Day
- 4–6 August — August Festivals, including Feast of San Salvador
- 15 September – Independence Day, anniversary of the Act of Independence of Central America.
- 2 November – Day of the Dead

== Deaths ==
- 6 January — Sigifredo Ochoa, 80, military officer and politician, deputy (2012–2015).
