= 2020 in El Salvador =

- Decades: 2000s; 2010s; 2020s
- See also: Other events of 2020; Timeline of Salvadoran history

Events in the year 2020 in El Salvador.

== Incumbents ==
- President: Nayib Bukele
- Vice President: Félix Ulloa

== Events ==
- 11 March – After the WHO classified COVID-19 as a pandemic, President Nayib Bukele closed all public and private schools in the country for 21 days and requested the Legislative Assembly to declaring a state of emergency and state of exception, despite there being no confirmed COVID-19 cases in the country.
- 16 March – A diplomatic dispute erupted with Mexico after President Nayib Bukele accused the Mexican government of "being irresponsible" for allegedly allowing a dozen people with COVID-19 to board a plane bound for El Salvador International Airport. Mexican foreign secretary Marcelo Ebrard responded that "all flights to El Salvador, including the one mentioned by the president [Bukele], have been cancelled" while Mexican deputy health minister Hugo López-Gatell Ramírez denied the charge and claimed the individuals were uninfected.
- 8 June – 1989 murders of Jesuits in El Salvador: Trial of Inocente Orlando Montano and René Yusshy Mendoza begins in Spain.
- 16 August – Santos Guevara a.k.a. “Comandante Domínguez“, former leader of the Farabundo Martí National Liberation Front (FMLN) is arrested for shooting down a helicopter belonging to the United States military, killing the pilot and wounding two others during the Salvadoran Civil War.
- September – After the International Crisis Group suggested that El Salvador's recent decline in homicides may be related to a pact between gangs and the government, Attorney General Raúl Melara opens an investigation.
- 11 September – 1989 murders of Jesuits: Former colonel and vice minister for public security Inocente Orlando Montano, 77, is convicted in Spain for 133 years for "terrorist assassinations".
- 15 September – Independence Day: President Bukele calls for unity and attacks his political opponents in a speech before his Cabinet and the diplomatic corps.
- 19 October – Diario El Salvador runs its first publication as a newspaper.
- 15 December – The U.S. and El Salvador reach an agreement to return asylum-seekers who reach the southern border of the United States back to El Salvador, where they can seek government protection. Similar agreements have been reached with Honduras and Guatemala, but with such little success that critics refer to the program as “deportation with a layover.” No starting date for the agreement has been given.
- 28 December – The U.S. cuts military aid to El Salvador, Guatemala, and Honduras.

== Deaths ==
- December 27 – Melecio Rivera, 82, Salvadoran sports executive, president of the El Salvador Olympic Committee (1997–1999), COVID-19.

== See also ==
- 2020 in Central America
- 2020 Atlantic hurricane season
- COVID-19 pandemic in El Salvador
