= 2014 in El Salvador =

- Decades: 1990s; 2000s; 2010s; 2020s
- See also: Other events of 2014; Timeline of Salvadoran history

The following lists events that happened in 2014 in El Salvador.

== Incumbents ==
- President: Mauricio Funes (until 1 June), Salvador Sánchez Cerén (starting 1 June)
- Vice President: Salvador Sánchez Cerén (until 1 June), Óscar Ortiz (starting 1 June)

== Events ==
=== January ===
- 30 January – A man whose boat was adrift for sixteen months is rescued at the Marshall Islands. The journey began with a companion as part of a venture from Mexico for El Salvador in September 2012.

=== February ===
- 2 February – Voters in El Salvador go to the polls with a tight race expected.

=== June ===
- 1 June – Former Farabundo Martí National Liberation Front guerrilla leader Salvador Sánchez Cerén is sworn in as the President of El Salvador.

=== October ===
- 13 October – A 7.4 magnitude earthquake occurs off the coast of El Salvador with a tsunami warning issued for the Pacific Ocean coasts of El Salvador, Nicaragua and Honduras.
