= 2016 in El Salvador =

- Decades: 1990s; 2000s; 2010s; 2020s
- See also: Other events of 2016; Timeline of Salvadoran history

Events in the year 2016 in El Salvador.

== Incumbents ==
- President: Salvador Sánchez Cerén
- Vice President: Óscar Ortiz

== Events ==
=== August ===
- 5–21August – 8 athletes from El Salvador competed at the 2016 Summer Olympics in Rio de Janeiro, Brazil.
