= 2017 in El Salvador =

- Decades: 1990s; 2000s; 2010s; 2020s
- See also: Other events of 2017; Timeline of Salvadoran history

Events in the year 2017 in El Salvador.

== Incumbents ==
- President: Salvador Sánchez Cerén
- Vice President: Óscar Ortiz

== Events ==
=== Sport ===
- Continuing form 2016: the 2016–17 Copa El Salvador
- Continuing form 2016: the 2016–17 Primera División de Fútbol Profesional season
- Continuing form 2016: the 2016–17 Segunda División de Fútbol Salvadoreño

== Deaths ==
- 26 February – "Gustavito", hippopotamus from El Salvador National Zoological Park (b. 2002).
- 27 February – Carlos Humberto Romero, politician (b. 1924).
