= 2013 in El Salvador =

- Decades: 1990s; 2000s; 2010s; 2020s
- See also: Other events of 2013; Timeline of Salvadoran history

The following lists events that happened in 2013 in El Salvador.

== Incumbents ==
- President: Mauricio Funes
- Vice President: Salvador Sánchez Cerén
