= Coffee production in El Salvador =

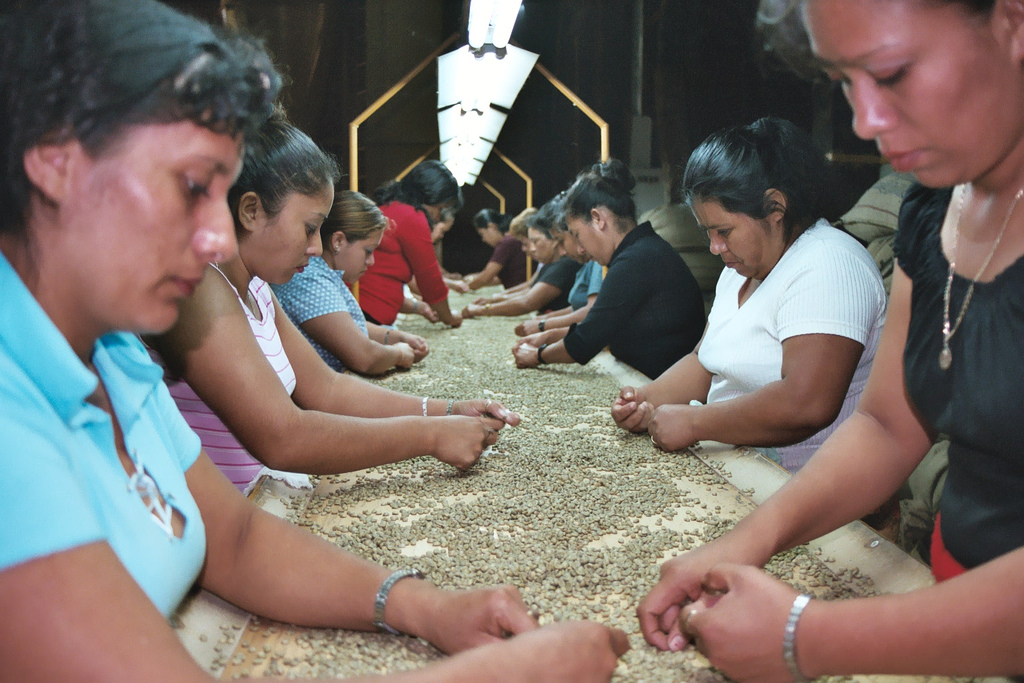
Green coffee processing in Ahuachapán

Coffee production in El Salvador has fueled the Salvadoran economy and shaped its history for more than a century. Rapidly growing in the 19th century, coffee in El Salvador has traditionally provided more than 50% of the country's export revenues, reaching a peak in 1980 with a revenue of more than $615 million. With the political and economic turmoil resulting from a civil war in the 1980s, the coffee industry has struggled to recover entirely, and by 1985 earned around $403 million from coffee.

Yields of green coffee, a Salvadoran specialty declined in absolute terms from 175,000 tons in 1979 to 141,000 tons in 1986; a 19 percent drop attributed directly to decreased levels of investment caused by the war. Since 2000, the industry has been greatly affected by increased competition from other countries on the world market, whose cheaper coffee beans have caused prices to plummet. As of 2002 coffee trading is only responsible for 3.5% of El Salvador's GNP and over 90% of El Salvador's coffee is grown in shade coffee plantations and around 80% of El Salvador's forests are associated with shade coffee plantations.

== Background ==
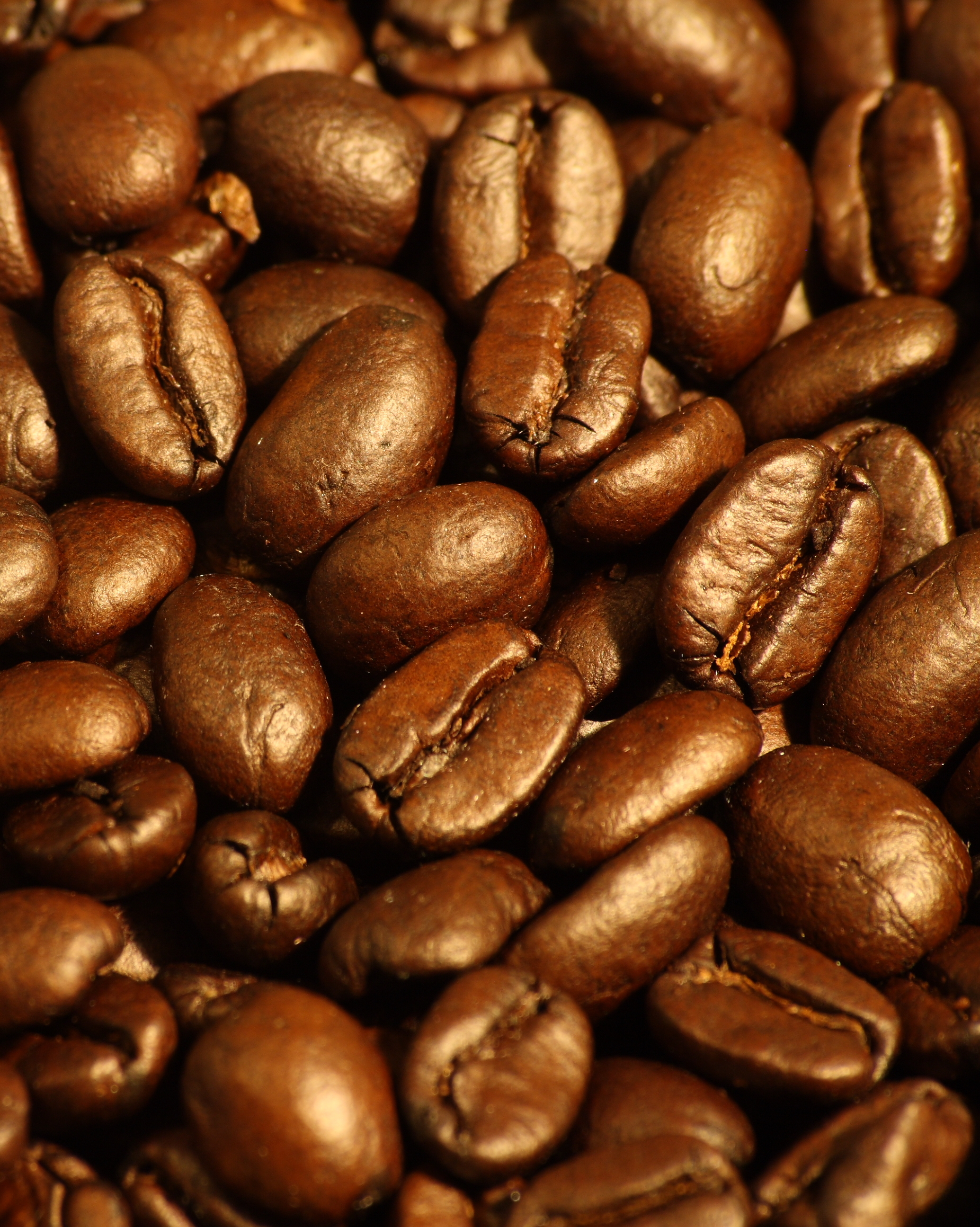
Dark roasted coffee beans from El Salvador.

Coffee was first cultivated in El Salvador for domestic use early in the 19th century. By mid-century its commercial promise was evident, and the government began to favor its production through legislation such as tax breaks for producers, exemption from military service for coffee workers, and elimination of export duties for new producers. By 1880 coffee had become virtually the sole export crop.

Compared with Indigofera, previously the dominant export commodity, coffee was a more demanding crop. Since coffee bushes required several years to produce a usable harvest, its production required a greater commitment of capital, labor, and land than did indigo. Coffee also grew best at a certain altitude, whereas indigo flourished almost anywhere.

Unlike those of Guatemala and Costa Rica, the Salvadoran coffee industry developed largely without the benefit of external technical and financial help. El Salvador nonetheless became one of the most efficient coffee producers in the world. This was especially true on the large coffee plantations, where the yield per hectare increased in proportion to the size of the plantation, a rare occurrence in plantation agriculture. The effect of coffee production on Salvadoran society has been immeasurable, not only in terms of land tenure but also because the coffee industry has served as a catalyst for the development of infrastructure (roads and railroads) and as a mechanism for the integration of indigenous communities into the national economy.

Salvadoran coffee is distinguished by being grown in mineral-rich volcanic soils, as the country is within the Central American volcanic arc. Its main coffee-producing regions are Apaneca-Ilamatepec, Alotepeque-Metapán, Cacahuatique, and El Bálsamo-Quezaltepec, each with different climates. This combination of volcanic soil and regional diversity has made the country a source of specialty coffee.

== Political obstacles ==
In the decades prior to the civil conflict of the 1980s, export earnings from coffee allowed growers to expand production, finance the development of a cotton industry, and establish a light manufacturing sector. After 1979, however, government policies, guerrilla attacks, and natural disasters reduced investment, impeding the coffee industry's growth. To make matters worse, after a price jump in 1986 world coffee prices fell by 35 percent in 1987, causing coffee exports to decline in value from US$539 million to US$347 million.

Government control of coffee marketing and export was regarded as one of the strongest deterrents to investment in the industry. In the first year of Incafe's existence, coffee yields dropped by over 20 percent. During each of the ensuing four years, yields were about 30 percent lower than those registered during the 1978-80 period.

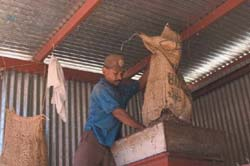
A Salvadoran coffee farmer.

Although the area in production remained fairly constant at approximately 180,000 hectares, production of green coffee declined in absolute terms from 175,000 tons in 1979 to 141,000 tons in 1986; this 19 percent drop was a direct result of lower yields, which in turn were attributed to decreased levels of investment. According to the Salvadoran Coffee Growers Association (Asociacion Cafetalera de El Salvador—ACES), besides controlling the sale of coffee, Incafe also charged growers export taxes and service charges equal to about 50 percent of the sale price and was often late in paying growers for their coffee.

Coffee growers also suffered from guerrilla attacks, extortion, and the imposition of so-called "war taxes" during the 1980s. These difficulties, in addition to their direct impact on production, also decreased investment. Under normal conditions, coffee growers replaced at least 5 percent of their coffee plants each year because the most productive coffee plants are between five and fifteen years old. Many coffee growers in El Salvador, in an effort to avoid further losses, neglected to replant.

Although most coffee production took place in the western section of El Salvador, coffee growers who operated in the eastern region were sometimes compelled to strike a modus vivendi with the guerrillas. During the 1984-85 harvest, for example, the guerrillas added to their "war tax" demand a threat to attack any plantation they thought underpaid workers. They demanded that workers receive the equivalent of US$4.00 per 100 pounds picked, a US$1.00 increase over what was then the going rate. The fact that growers negotiated with the guerrillas—while the government looked the other way—demonstrated the continuing importance of coffee export revenue to both the growers and the government.

== History and political background ==
Coffee would become the last of the great monoculture export commodities in El Salvador. Its widespread cultivation began in the mid-19th century as the world demand for indigo dye dried up. The huge profits that it yielded served as a further impetus for the process whereby land became concentrated in the hands of an oligarchy. Although legend and radical propaganda have quantified the oligarchy at the level of the Fourteen Families, a figure of several hundred families lies much closer to the truth. A succession of presidents, nominally both conservative and liberal, throughout the last half of the 19th century supported the seizure of land from individual smallholders and communal owners.

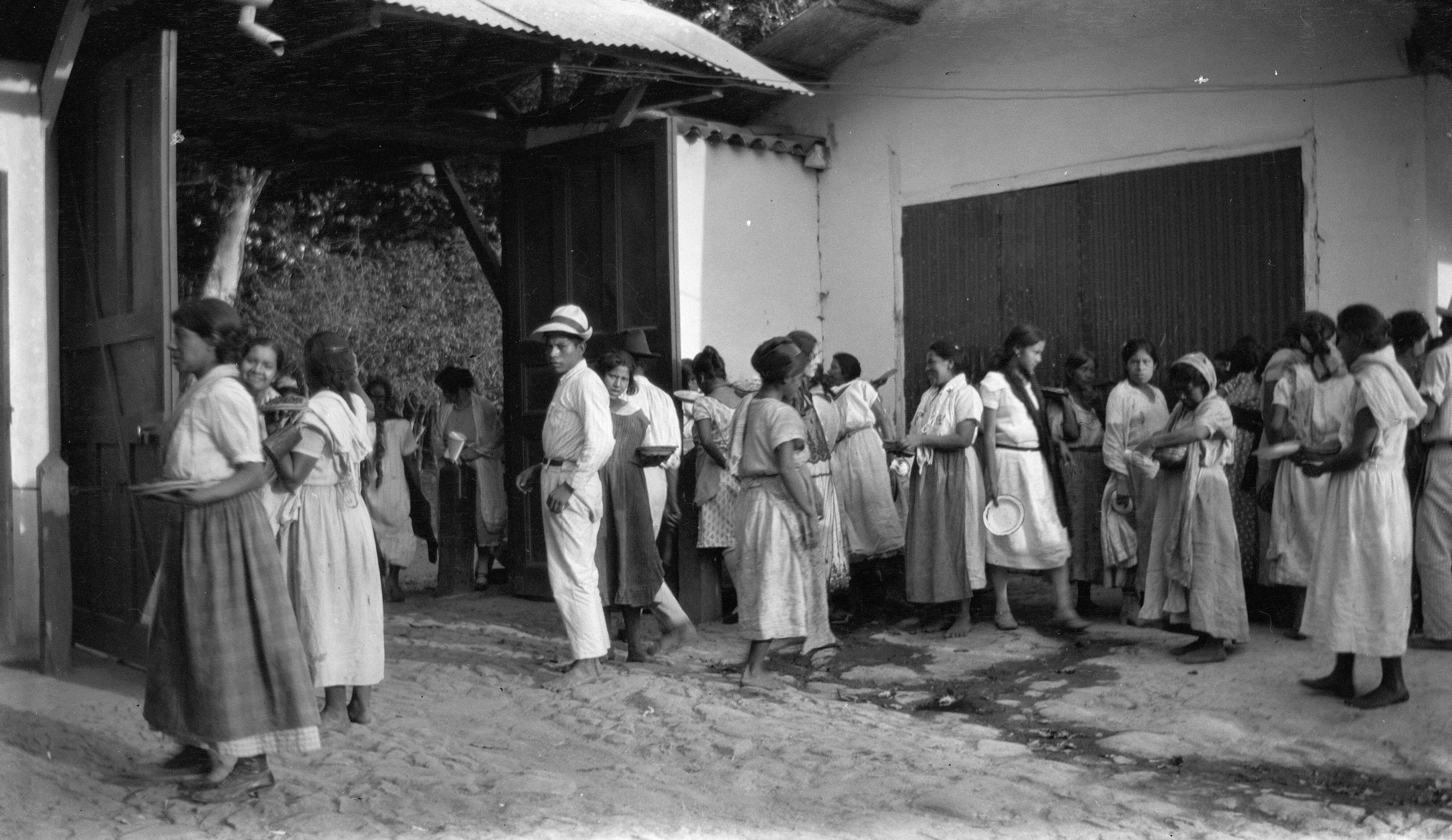
Workers on a coffee plantation in El Salvador waiting for the distribution of wages in the form of food. Photo taken by Eduard Paulig.

Despite the continued participation of conservatives, however, the period of the establishment of the coffee republic (roughly 1871 to 1927) is described commonly as the era of the liberal state in El Salvador. The church was not as powerful in El Salvador as in other Latin American states at the time; therefore, the economic aspects of liberalism—an adherence to the principles of free-market capitalism—dominated the conduct of the state. Anti-clericalism was a distinctly secondary theme, expressed primarily through social legislation (such as the establishment of secular marriage and education) rather than through the kind of direct action, e.g., repression and expropriation, taken against the church in 19th- and early 20th-century Mexico.

Despite some differences over the degree of emphasis of political versus economic issues, Salvadoran liberals generally agreed on the promotion of coffee as the predominant cash crop, on the development of infrastructure (railroads and port facilities) primarily in support of the coffee trade, on the elimination of communal landholdings to facilitate further coffee production, on the passage of antivagrancy laws to ensure that displaced campesinos and other rural residents provided sufficient labor for the coffee fincas (plantations), and on the suppression of rural discontent.

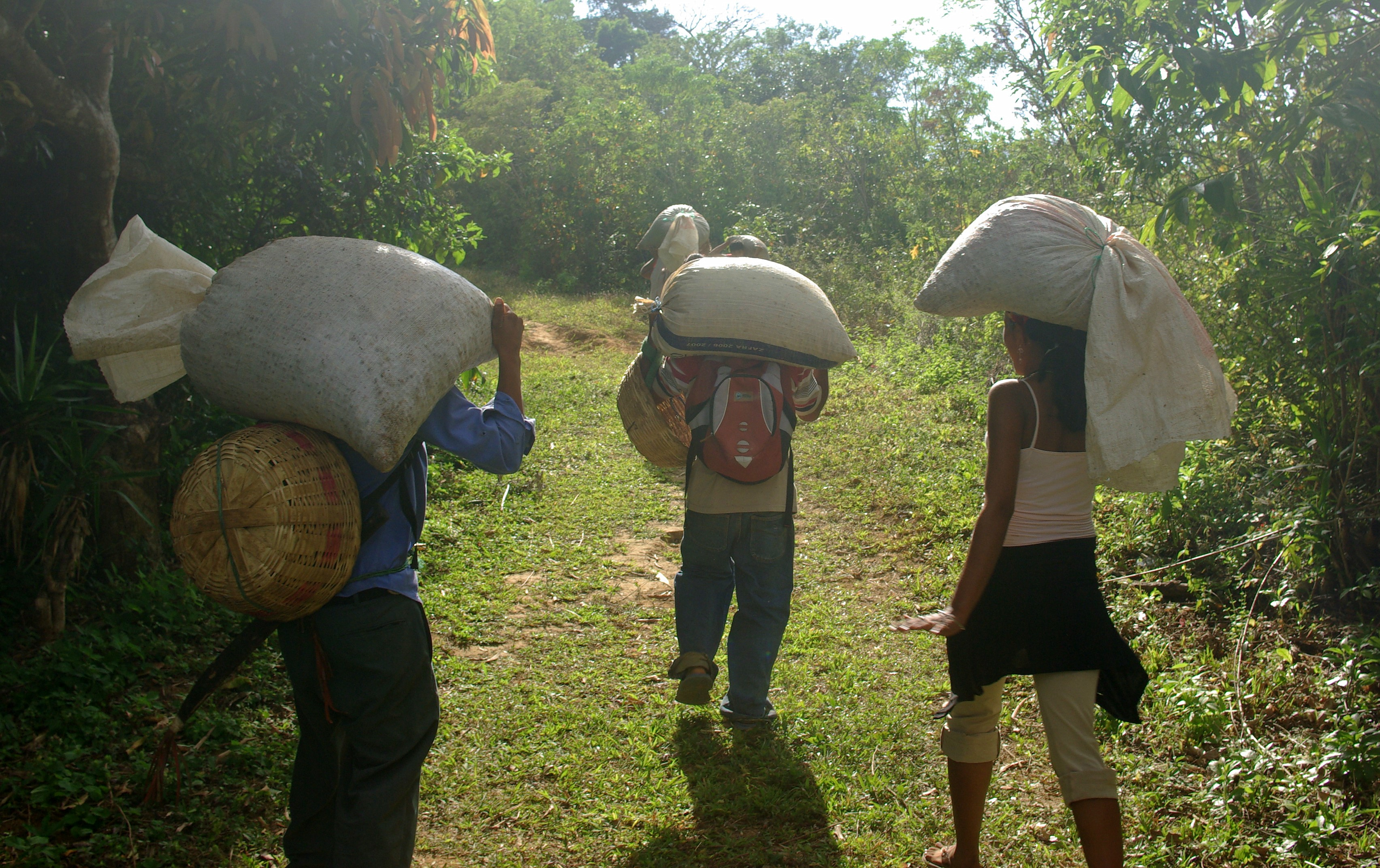
Fair trade coffee growers in Tacuba in western El Salvador.

The coffee industry grew inexorably in El Salvador, after a somewhat tentative start in the mid-19th century. Between 1880 and 1914, the value of coffee exports rose by more than 1,100 percent. Although the coffee industry itself was not taxed by the government, tremendous revenue was raised indirectly through import duties on goods imported with the foreign currencies that coffee sales earned (goods intended for the consumption of the small coffee-producing elite). From 1870 to 1914, an average of 58.7 percent of government revenue derived from this source. Even if the coffee elite did not run the government directly (and many scholars argue that they did), the elite certainly provided the bulk of the government's financial support. This support, coupled with the humbler and more mundane mechanisms of corruption, ensured the coffee growers of overwhelming influence within the government and the military.

The priorities of the coffee industry dictated a shift in the mission of the embryonic Salvadoran armed forces from external defense of the national territory to the maintenance of internal order. The creation of the National Guard (Guardia Nacional—GN) in 1912 epitomizes this change. The duties of the GN differed from those of the National Civil Police (Policia Nacional Civil—PNC), mainly in that GN personnel were specifically responsible for providing security on the coffee fincas. Most fincas enjoyed the services of their own GN units posted on the grounds; regional GN commanders routinely were compensated by the finca owners to ensure the continued loyalty of the guardsmen.

Suppression of rural dissent was subtle and institutionalized; campesinos generally accepted the status quo because of the implied threat of retaliation from the GN or other military units. One exception to this pattern was Aquino's rebellion. Although it predated the coffee boom, its reverberations were felt throughout Salvadoran society for decades.

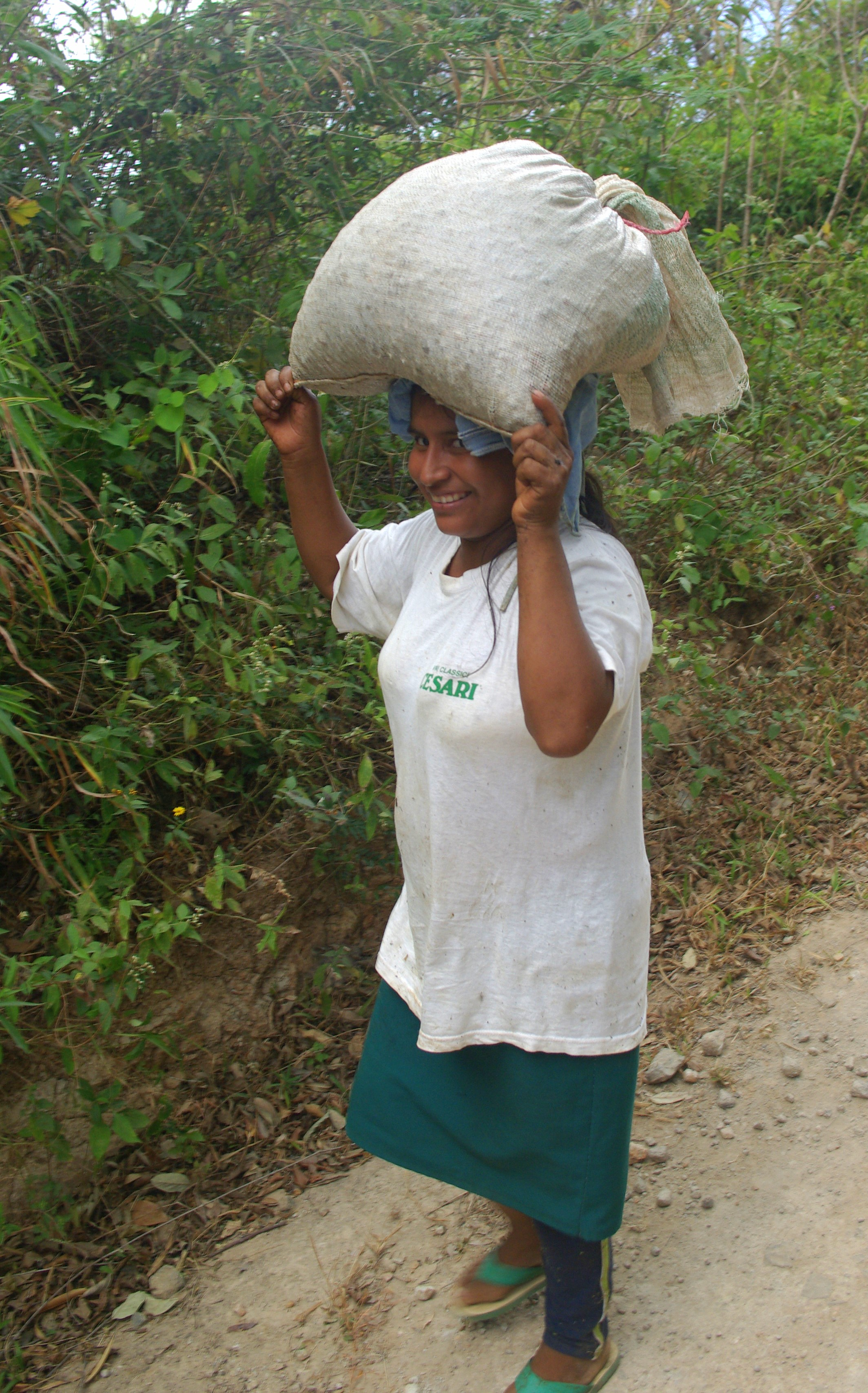
A Fair trade coffee grower.

Throughout the period of the liberal state in El Salvador, the preeminent position of the oligarchy was never threatened by the actions of the government. Some have attributed this to the pervasive influence of the organization that has been described as the "invisible government" of the country, the Coffee Growers Association (Asociacion Cafetalera). The direct (in the case of the Melendez-Quinonez mini-dynasty) and indirect connections of the presidents of the period with the country's powerful families undoubtedly came into play as well. Generally speaking, however, the system continued to function without adjustment because it worked well from the perspective of the small percentage of Salvadorans who benefited from it, namely the economic elite, upper-echelon government officials, and the military High Command.

Although society in general appeared to be static under the liberal state, the same truly cannot be said for the Salvadoran oligarchy. The introduction of coffee production in itself changed the composition of that group, as the new coffee barons joined the ranks of the old plantation owners (who in many cases were slow to recognize the potential of coffee and lost some wealth and standing by delaying their switch from indigo production). New blood also was introduced into the oligarchy by way of foreign immigration. These immigrants, who would eventually come to constitute the bulk of the Salvadoran merchant class, frequently married into the landowning oligarchic families, further diversifying the composition of the elite stratum of society.

Another process worthy of note during this period despite its lack of tangible results was the ongoing series of unification efforts by the Central American states. El Salvador was a prime mover in most of these attempts to reestablish an isthmian federation. In 1872 El Salvador signed a pact of union with Guatemala, Honduras, and Costa Rica but the union was never implemented. In 1876 a congress of all five Central American states failed to achieve agreement on federation. A provisional pact signed by the five states in 1889 technically created the "Republic of Central America" - that was never realized.

Undaunted, the governments of El Salvador, Honduras, and Nicaragua formed the "Greater Republic of Central America" (República Mayor de Centroamerica) via the Pact of Amapala (1895). Although Guatemala and Costa Rica considered joining the Greater Republic (which was rechristened "the United States of Central America" when its constitution went into effect in 1898), neither country joined. This union, which had planned to establish its capital city at Amapala on the Golfo de Fonseca, did not survive Tomas Regalado's seizure of power in El Salvador in 1898. Although the Central American spirit seemed willing, the commitment was weak. The notion of unification was another manifestation of the idealistic liberal ethos, and it proved durable and quite resistant to political realities.

== Recent developments ==
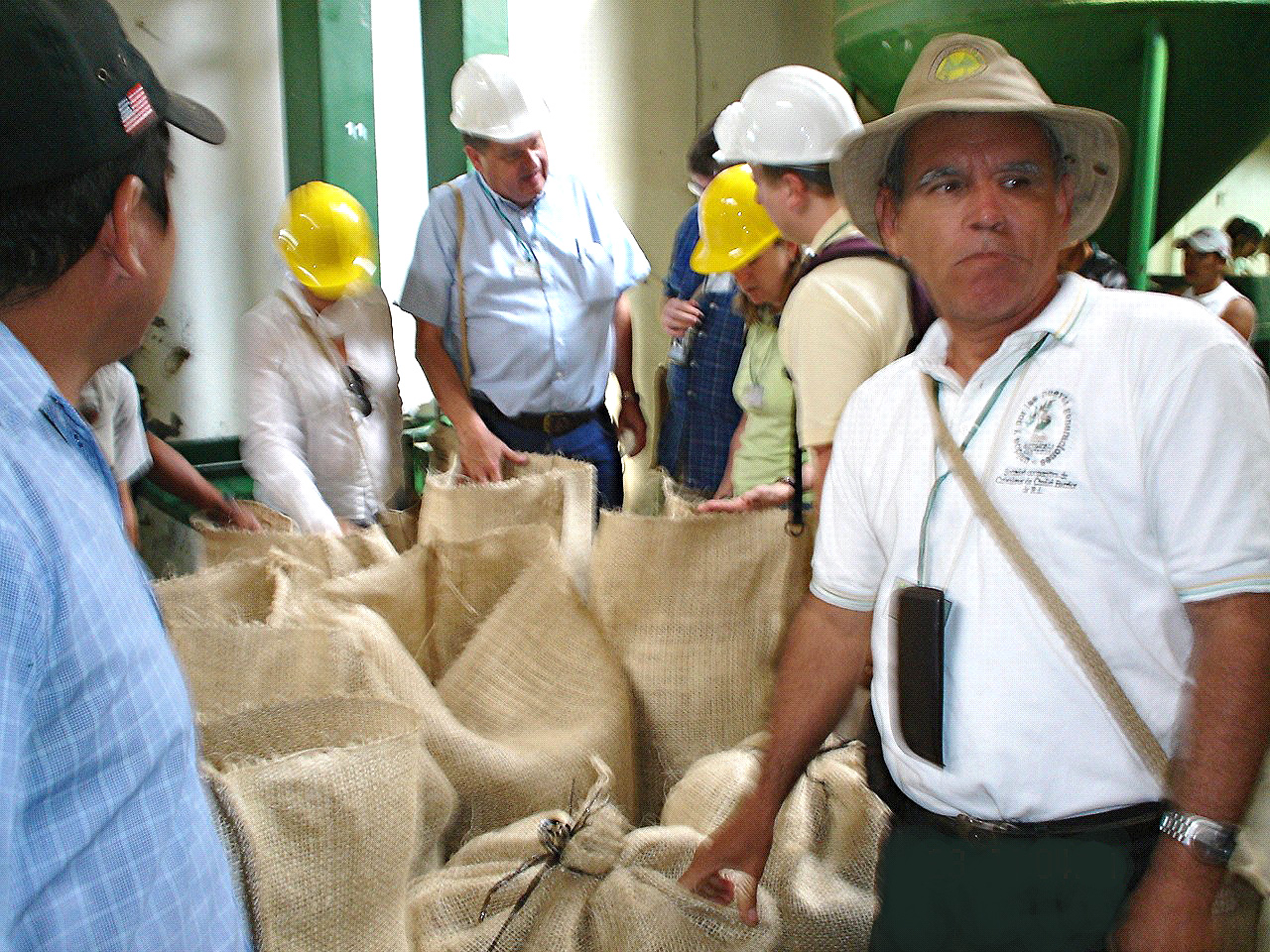
The Ciudad Barrios Cooperative inspecting their coffee.

Coffee production flourished in El Salvador throughout much of the 20th century, reaching a peak in the late 1970s, culminating in 1980 when it was responsible for 50% of El Salvador's gross domestic product (GDP). With the political and economic turmoil resulting from a civil war in the 1980s, the coffee industry has struggled to recover, and by 1985 earned around $403 million from coffee.

The coffee industry in El Salvador has shown a greater decline in recent years and since 2000, the industry has been greatly affected by increased competition from other countries on the world market, whose cheaper coffee beans have caused prices to plummet. As of 2002 coffee trading is responsible for 3.5% of El Salvador's GDP. Since 2000, 70,000 have lost their jobs as a result of the rapid decline in the Salvadoran coffee trade. The heavy coffee production of the past has taken its toll on the environment in many areas of the country.

In some parts of El Salvador coffee is still highly important to the economy. The Ciudad Barrios Cooperative, for instance, operating in the Cacahuatique mountains of eastern El Salvador since the late 1970s, was producing approximately 8.5 million pounds of coffee annually until 2003. The Cooperative has since been involved with organizations such as USAID which has aided small and medium-sized Salvadoran coffee producers to produce for international higher-grade coffee markets, and was awarded a Rainforest Alliance certification. Other coffee producers have also been increasingly influenced by international campaign organizations, with many producers now cultivating fair trade coffee.

== Labor issues ==
Harvesting coffee has been determined by national law as a hazardous activity. In 2013, the U.S. Department of Labor reported that 6.3% of children aged 5 to 14 were working children and that 56% of them engaged in child labor in the agricultural sector, harvesting coffee among other dangerous activities. Coffee has also been listed in the department's 2014 List of Goods Produced by Child Labor or Forced Labor among four other goods from the agricultural sector for the most part.

== See also ==
- List of countries by coffee production
