= 2015 in El Salvador =

- Decades: 1990s; 2000s; 2010s; 2020s
- See also: Other events of 2015; Timeline of Salvadoran history

The following lists events that happened in 2015 in El Salvador.

== Incumbents ==
- President: Salvador Sánchez Cerén
- Vice President: Óscar Ortiz

== Events ==
=== March ===
The national murder rate was the worst in 10 years, with 481 people murdered following the collapse of a truce between rival gangs. Lauren Carasik, clinical professor of law and the director of the international human rights clinic at the Western New England University School of Law, warned that a pending US government aid proposal could increase the gang-related violence in the country.

=== May ===
The Central American Junior and Youth Championships in Athletics was held in San Salvador, at the Estadio Jorge "Mágico" González.
