= 2018 in El Salvador =

- Decades: 1990s; 2000s; 2010s; 2020s
- See also: Other events of 2018; Timeline of Salvadoran history

== Incumbents ==
- President: Salvador Sánchez Cerén
- Vice President: Óscar Ortiz

== Events ==
- The 2018 Salvadoran legislative election is held to elect all 84 members of the Legislative Assembly of El Salvador.
