= Cacahuatique Mountains =

Mountain range in El Salvador

Coordinates: 13.7665°N 88.2116°W

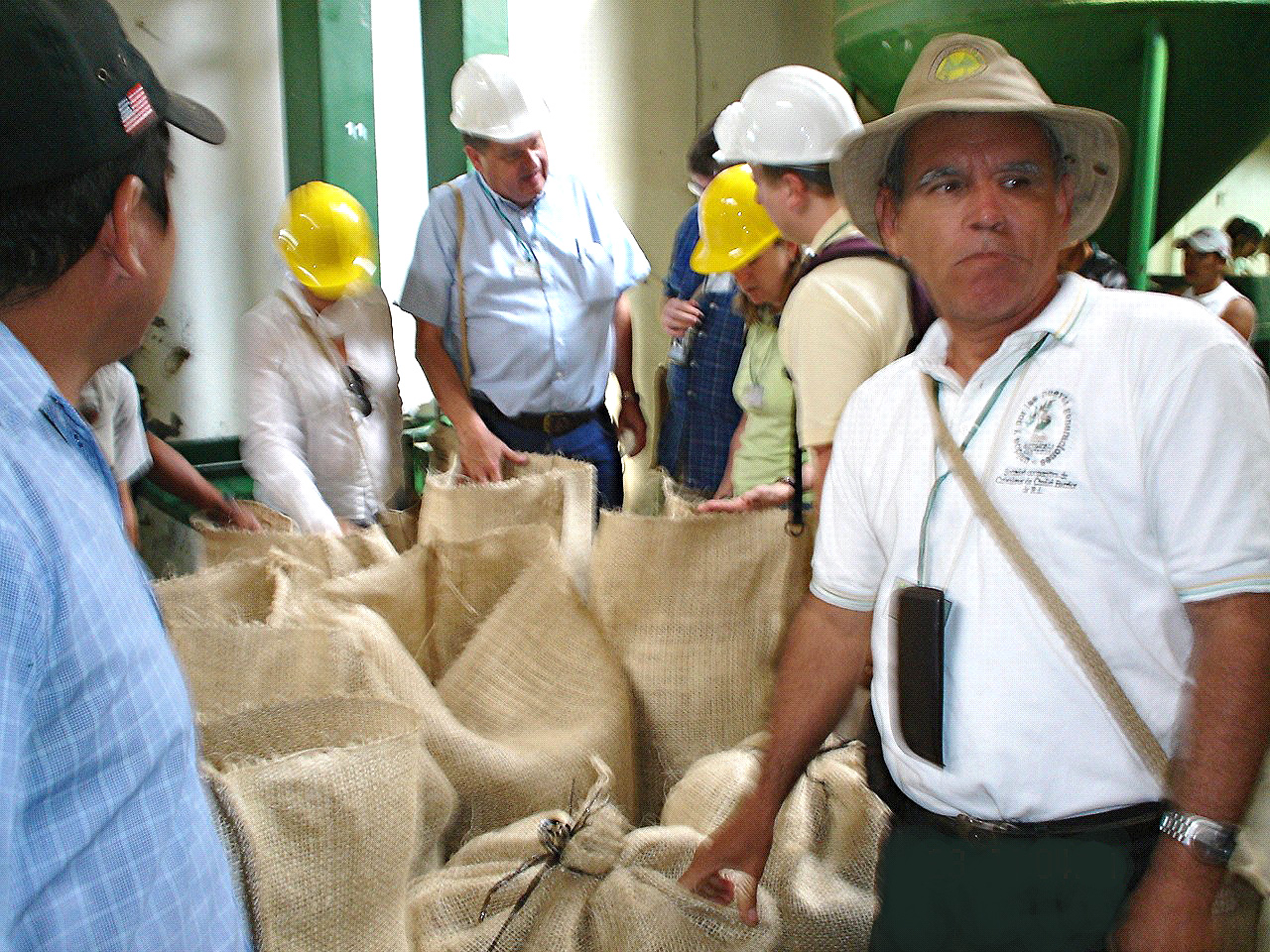
The Ciudad Barrios Cooperative inspecting their coffee in Cacahuatique

The Cacahuatique Mountains are a mountain range and hilly area of eastern El Salvador. Coffee production plays an important role in the economy, particularly by the Ciudad Barrios Cooperative which, as of 2003, was producing approximately 3,800 tonnes (8.4 million pounds) of coffee annually in Cacahuatique.
