= Ruth Eleonora López =

Salvadoran lawyer and human rights defender

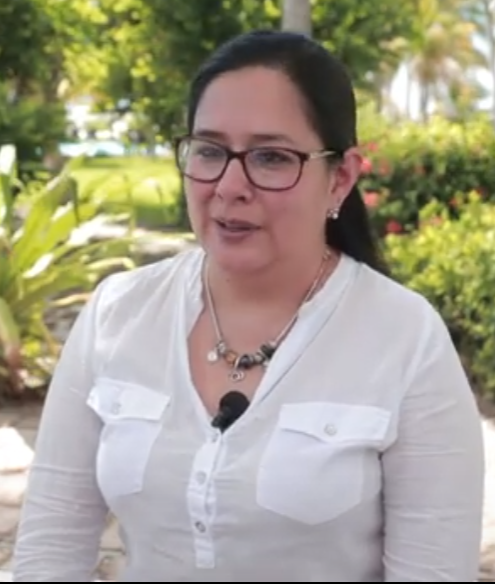
- At a 2023 meeting of social organizations
- Born: Ruth Eleonora López Alfaro; 27 September 1977 (age 48); San Salvador, El Salvador
- Education: University of Havana
- Occupations: Lawyer, notary, researcher, analyst, activist
- Employer: Cristosal

Ruth Eleonora López Alfaro (born 27 September 1977) is a Salvadoran lawyer, notary, social researcher, analyst, and human rights defender, recognized for her work in the fight against corruption and the promotion of transparency in El Salvador. In December 2024, she was included in the BBC's list of the world's 100 most inspiring and influential women.

== Early life and education ==
Ruth Eleonora López was born in San Salvador on 27 September 1977. Her father was a teacher, which kindled her interest in teaching at an early age. Due to the Salvadoran Civil War, her family moved to Nicaragua, where she lived for 11 years, and later to Cuba, where she lived for 16. There she studied to be a lawyer, graduating from the University of Havana in 1999 with honors as the best foreign student and best student at its Faculty of Law.

In 2008, she returned to El Salvador, facing the challenges of adapting to the academic and work environment of a country still dealing with the aftermath of armed conflict and political transitions. She became a specialist in electoral law, human rights, and commercial law.

== Professional career ==
López has played key roles in various public sector institutions, where she has worked to promote justice, transparency, and accountability. Her career spans work in the electoral field and leadership in the defense of human rights, questioning and challenging power structures.

=== Beginnings in electoral and public law ===
After her return to El Salvador, López began a career in public institutions, working in key areas of the legal and administrative fields.

At the Supreme Electoral Court (TSE), she worked to strengthen democratic processes from 2008 to 2014.

At the Salvadoran Social Security Institute (ISSS), she participated in legal and administrative supervision processes from 2014 to 2019, defending labor and social security rights, including the expansion of coverage for Salvadorans residing abroad and for independent workers.

As a member of the board of directors of the Superintendency of Competition from 2014 to 2021, she promoted legal practices focused on market regulation. In a December 2024 interview, she claimed to have been responsible for more than $8 million in fines to companies for anti-competitive practices in various economic sectors. She was part of the decision that forced the sale of national beer brands Suprema and Regia Extra to prevent a "significant limitation of competition" caused by the purchase of SABMiller's operations in El Salvador by AB InBev.

=== Academia and education ===
López has also taken on teaching roles at higher education institutions, focusing on training new generations of lawyers with a critical perspective on human rights, the rule of law and government transparency. She has also taught classes on commercial law. She is a consultant and associate professor at Central American University, San Salvador.

=== Defender of transparency and human rights ===
López is the legal director of the anti-corruption and justice unit of Cristosal, a regional organization committed to defending human rights.

Through her participation in the media and social networks, she has maintained a critical stance against power. In an interview in March 2024, she stressed that "from the perspective of power, it is better that people do not know, because to the extent that people do not know, they exercise their rights less."

She has questioned the ability of institutions such as the TSE to guarantee democratic processes such as voting abroad. She has also criticized the lack of transparency in the management of public funds and the concentration of power in government structures.

López was arrested by the Office of the Attorney General (FGR) on 18 May 2025. The FGR accused her of "collaborating in the theft of funds from the state coffers" ("colaboró en la sustracción de fondos de las arcas del Estado") with Eugenio Chicas, a former magistrate of the TSE.

On 20 May 2026, to mark a year since López was detained, Amnesty International publicly called on Salvadoran authorities to immediately release her, describing her as a prisoner of conscience.

== Recognition ==
In December 2024, the BBC included López in its list of the 100 most inspiring and influential women in the world, highlighting her work in the fight against corruption and the protection of electoral and human rights in El Salvador.
