= Roxana Soriano =

Salvadoran lawyer

- Official portrait

President of the Supreme Electoral Court of El Salvador
- Incumbent
- Assumed office 27 September 2024
- Preceded by: Dora Martínez de Barahona

President of the Court of Accounts of El Salvador
- In office 28 August 2023 – 26 September 2024
- Preceded by: Walter Salvador Araujo
- Succeeded by: Vacant

Personal details
- Education: Captain General Gerardo Barrios Military School
- Occupation: Lawyer

Roxana Saledonia Soriano de Viaud is a Salvadoran lawyer. She has been president of the Supreme Electoral Court of El Salvador since 2024 and previously served as president of the Court of Accounts between 2023 and 2024.

== Career ==
Soriano earned a degree in law from the Captain General Gerardo Barrios Military School and has done a master's degree in international business at José Matías Delgado University.

She has worked as a lawyer and was legal officer and heaf of aviation regulations and registration at the Avianca Group. Among other positions, she has served as Director of the Board of Directors of the National Registry of Natural Persons, President of the Central American and Caribbean Organization of Supreme Audit Institutions, and Chair of the Legal Advisory Committee, as well as a full member of the executive board and of the Latin American and Caribbean Organization of Supreme Audit Institutions.

Soriano has served as president of the Foundation for Governance in El Salvador; in 2020, Soriano was appointed commissioner of the Institute for Access to Public Information; and ahead of the 2021 legislative elections, she was a pre-candidate to the Legislative Assembly for the San Salvador Department for the ruling Nuevas Ideas party.

On 23 August 2023 the Legislative Assembly appointed Soriano as the new president of the Court of Accounts, and began her office on 28 August. Due to her previous ties to Nuevas Ideas, a constitutional challenge was filed against her appointment, even though Soriano had previously denied any sympathy for or affiliation with the party. On 26 September 2023, Soriano was elected by the Legislative Assembly the new President of the Supreme Electoral Court of El Salvador, alongside new justices, and she was criticized for not having resigned earlier from her position at the Court of Accounts, something she did that very same day.
