= Fourteen Families =

Collection of Salvadoran aristocrats

Fourteen Families (Spanish: Catorce Familias) was a term used to label and refer to the oligarchy of El Salvador during the country's period known as the "Coffee Republic" from 1871 to 1927. The families controlled most of the land in the country.

== See also ==
- Coffee production in El Salvador
