= Claudia Rodríguez de Guevara =

Former presidential designate and President of El Salvador 2023-2024

Director of Municipal Works
- Incumbent
- Assumed office 25 November 2021
- President: Nayib Bukele
- Preceded by: Position established

Acting President of El Salvador
- In office 1 December 2023 – 1 June 2024
- President: Nayib Bukele (suspended)

First Presidential Designate of El Salvador
- In office 1 December 2023 – 1 June 2024
- President: Nayib Bukele
- Preceded by: Medardo González

Personal details
- Born: 1980 or 1981 (age 44–45) El Salvador
- Party: Nuevas Ideas
- Occupation: Accountant, politician

Claudia Juana Rodríguez de Guevara (born 1980 or 1981) is a Salvadoran accountant who was the presidential designate and head of state of El Salvador from 1 December 2023 to 1 June 2024. She assumed presidential powers and duties after President Nayib Bukele was granted a leave of absence by the Legislative Assembly to focus on his 2024 re-election campaign, which some constitutional lawyers have argued violates the country's constitution.

Rodríguez served as a finance manager for Bukele both before and during his presidency from 2019 to 2023. In 2021, Rodríguez was appointed as the Director of Municipal Works, and in 2022, she was named as Bukele's private secretary. On 30 November 2023, after granting Bukele and Vice President Félix Ulloa a leave of absence to run for re-election in the 2024 election, Rodríguez was selected by the Legislative Assembly to serve as designated president, a position she assumed the following day. Her appointment as presidential designate to assume presidential duties and powers has been criticized by lawyers as unconstitutional. Rodríguez is the first woman to hold presidential powers in El Salvador.

== Early life ==
Rodríguez was born in 1980 or 1981.

Rodríguez studied at the Reverend José Saberlio Ponce Christian College and the General Francisco Morazán National Institute. She later attended the Francisco Gavidia University for five semesters, although she did not graduate. She also completed a course at the Corporation of Accountants of El Salvador.

Rodríguez previously served as a bidding and billing manager for Servicios Quirúrgicos de El Salvador, S.A. de C.V., as a finance manager for Obermet, S.A. de C.V., a company owned by the Bukele family, and as an auxiliary accountant for Tire Center, S.A. de C.V. In 2011, she founded a company which was a subsidiary of Alba Petróleos, which itself was a subsidiary of the PDVSA, a Venezuelan oil company. That year, she was also a legal representative for MOV-I, S.A. de C.V. She was the president of NRA, S.A. de C.V. from 2011 to 2018.

== Accounting career ==
From 2012 to 2015, she served as a finance manager for the municipality of Nuevo Cuscatlán while Nayib Bukele was its mayor. She served as the municipal treasurer of San Salvador while Bukele was its mayor from 2015 to 2018. In August 2018, she was appointed as the finance manager for Nuevas Ideas, the political party established by Bukele in 2017; she is a member of Nuevas Ideas In December 2023, the Gato Encerrado magazine alleged that she had received US$1.2 million in checks from the San Salvador mayor's office during Bukele's term as mayor of San Salvador.

Rodríguez continued her service as a finance manager during Bukele's presidency beginning in June 2019. In November 2022, Rodríguez became the director of the Emergency Committee and oversaw the allocation of US$2 billion of funds to combat the COVID-19 pandemic. On 25 November 2021, she was appointed by Bukele as the president of the board of directors of the newly created Directorate of Municipal Works. On 17 March 2022, Bukele named Rodríguez as his private secretary. She replaced Ernesto Castro, who had earlier assumed office as president of the Legislative Assembly. On 21 April 2023, Bukele named Rodríguez as the representative of the board of directors of the Road Conservation Fund. Rodríguez also previously served as the coordinator of the FANTEL-Dalton after the resignation of Carolina Recinos.

== Presidential designation ==
On 30 November 2023, the Legislative Assembly selected Rodríguez as the designated president after granting Bukele a leave of absence to focus on his 2024 re-election campaign, which many politicians and constitutional lawyers have argued is illegal and unconstitutional. Although she assumed presidential powers and duties, she did not assume the office of president itself; her official title is the "Presidential Designate of the Republic in Charge of the Office" ("Designada por el Presidente de la República, Encargada de Despacho").

She was confirmed with 67 in favor and 11 against with 6 absent out of 84 votes. She officially assumed her presidential powers on 1 December and she was described by various media outlets as the country's first female president, although in an acting capacity; she will maintain her powers until the end of the presidential term on 1 June 2024. President of the Legislative Assembly Castro and Guillermo Gallegos, a deputy from the Grand Alliance for National Unity, contradicted each other as to whether Rodríguez was sworn in or not. Castro claimed that she was sworn in, although not publicly, stating that "it did not have to be public" (no tenía que ser pública"). Meanwhile, Gallegos claimed that she was not sworn in as "she is simply the presidential designate, [...] it was determined that a swearing in was not necessary" ("ella es simplemente la designada del presidente, [...] se determinó que no era necesario el juramentarla").

Rodríguez's appointment as presidential designate to temporarily assume presidential duties and powers was criticized by various lawyers, opposition politicians, and analysts. Héctor Silva, the Nuestro Tiempo candidate for mayor of San Salvador wrote on X, "The current state of democracy in El Salvador: the office of the president of the Republic will by occupied by a person who nobody ever voted for" ("Estado actual de la democracia en El Salvador: la oficina del presidente de la República la ocupará una persona por la que nadie votó nunca"). Nationalist Republican Alliance (ARENA) deputy to the Legislative Assembly César Reyes described Rodríguez as part of "President Bukele's inner circle" ("círculo mas íntimo del presidente Bukele") and "a very unknown profile to everyone" ("un perfil que no era muy conocido para todos") who "they installed to guard the throne [presidency]" ("pusieron para que cuidara el trono"). Political analyst Carlos Araujo stated that "Only a naïve person would believe that [Rodríguez] is going to govern, he [Bukele] is not going to let go of power, he will be involved in reviewing what his ministers do. Asking for leave is just a mere appearance". Economist Julia Martínez stated that "Bukele is not going to let anyone ruin what he has done, and that’s why he proposed [Rodríguez], she is part of his circle of control". Lawyer Enrique Anaya posted on X that "if the designated lady [Rodríguez] actually exercises power in office, she is a USURPER, and not an acting president" ("si la sra designada ejerce el cargo de hecho, será una USURPADORA, y no una presidenta en funciones"). Ricardo Vaquerano, a Salvadoran investigative journalist, stated that the acting president must be a deputy of the Legislative Assembly, and as Rodríguez is not a deputy, he argued that, as a result, "there is no president in El Salvador at this moment". According to some street interviews conducted in San Salvador by Voice of America, some Salvadorans doubt that Rodríguez would actually be governing the country and that instead Bukele would govern through Rodríguez.

On 17 December 2023, Rodríguez accepted the resignation of Moisés Cabrera, the president of the board of directors of the Development Bank of El Salvador. On 22 December, she appointed Nelson Rivas as Cabrera's successor. On 6 May 2024, she appointed Mauricio Calderón Sansivirini as the president of the Salvadoran Institute of Coffee.

== Personal life ==
Rodríguez's brother, Douglas Rodríguez Fuentes, is currently the president of the Central Reserve Bank of El Salvador, having served since 19 September 2020.

== See also ==
- List of elected and appointed female heads of state and government

Political offices
Preceded by Medardo González	Presidential designate of El Salvador; 2023–present	Incumbent
Government offices
New office	Director of Municipal Works; 2021–present	Incumbent
