= Komanche =

Salvadoran content creator and broadcaster (1996–2026)

- Komanche in 2023 in La Velada del Año
- Born: Carlos José Rivera Alfaro; 27 September 1996; San Sebastián, San Vicente Department, El Salvador
- Died: 25 October 2026 (aged 30); Monterrey, Nuevo León, Mexico
- Cause of death: Suicide by hanging
- Other name: El Komanche
- Citizenship: El Salvador; Mexico (Note: Komanche had dual citizenship: Salvadoran (by birth) and Mexican (by residence).)
- Occupations: YouTuber; Streamer; Internet celebrity
- Years active: 2012–2026
- Known for: Organizer of the Squid Craft Games

Instagram information
- Page: El Komanche
- Followers: 880,000

Twitch information
- Channel: Komanche
- Years active: 2015–2026
- Followers: 1.7 million

YouTube information
- Channel: Komanche
- Subscribers: 507,000
- Views: 43,270,763
- Last updated: 26 October 2026

Carlos José Rivera Alfaro (27 September 1996 – 25 October 2026), known professionally as El Komanche or simply Komanche, was a Salvadoran streamer and content creator.

Rivera Alfaro was known mainly for his activity on Twitch, where he accumulated about 1.7 million followers, and for being one of the organizers of the Squid Craft Games, a Minecraft competition inspired by the series Squid Game that he promoted together with AuronPlay, Robleis and El Rubius. He began streaming in 2015 and, besides Twitch, had about half a million subscribers on YouTube and more than 880,000 followers on Instagram.

== Background ==
Rivera Alfaro was born on 27 September 1996 in San Sebastián, in the San Vicente department of El Salvador. According to Salvadoran and Mexican media, he began streaming on Twitch in 2015, during a period marked by economic and personal difficulties.

In 2022 he moved to Mexico to continue his career and settled in Monterrey, Nuevo León.

== Career ==
=== Early career ===
His first streams focused on video games such as Grand Theft Auto, Minecraft and Fortnite, as well as live conversations with his community. His popularity grew mostly between 2020 and 2022, and during that period he collaborated with other Spanish-speaking creators such as Fernanfloo, Ibai Llanos, Coscu and El Rubius.

=== Squid Craft Games ===
In January 2022 the first edition of the Squid Craft Games took place, an elimination tournament inside Minecraft based on Squid Game and organized as a Twitch Rivals event. Rivera Alfaro was one of its promoters together with AuronPlay, El Rubius and the team of Eufonia Studio, led by Alejandro Corrales (Alecuatro). The competition became one of the biggest successes on Twitch and, according to media reports, it broke the viewership record for a Twitch Rivals tournament.

The second edition was presented at an in-person event in Barcelona on 12 February 2023, with Rivera Alfaro and El Rubius as hosts. It was held from 28 February to 5 March 2023 with 200 participants and a US$100,000 prize. Rivera Alfaro, who competed as a player in addition to being an organizer, was eliminated on the fourth day. The winner was the American streamer Sapnap.

=== Other projects ===
In later years he added reactions to music albums and releases to his content. He was a self-declared fan of the singer Bad Bunny and, during an interview that Ibai Llanos conducted with the artist for his YouTube channel, both called him and spoke briefly with him. He later interviewed the Puerto Rican singer Mora.

According to CRHoy, he also took part in initiatives such as the Kings League Americas.

== Controversies ==
=== Dispute with Spreen (2023) ===
After the Squid Craft Games 2, Rivera Alfaro became involved in a social-media argument with the Argentine streamer Spreen. Media outlets reported that, after Spreen's followers asked for Rivera Alfaro to be eliminated from the tournament, he replied that he would not invite him again; he then deleted his messages and, according to reports, both settled the conflict.

=== Episode with La Liendra (2023) ===
In February 2023, after the ESLAND Awards ceremony, Rivera Alfaro said in a stream that the Colombian content creator La Liendra had approached him several times during the event to ask for a spot in the Squid Craft Games 2, and he refused. La Liendra responded by apologizing, but claimed that Rivera Alfaro had not recounted exactly what happened.

=== Harassment allegations and FernandaVaal case (2026) ===
In late September 2026, the Mexican streamer FernandaVaal publicly accused Rivera Alfaro of alleged harassment and inappropriate conduct, claiming that he had asked her for favors in exchange for access or influence at large Twitch community events, and said she would take legal action. Rivera Alfaro categorically denied the accusations in a live stream and showed screenshots of private chats to rebut the claims. For his part, the Colombian streamer Westcol intervened, stating that he had seen alleged evidence and advised the accusers to take the case to prosecutors, which unleashed an intense wave of online harassment against the Salvadoran. After Rivera Alfaro's death in October of that year, Westcol expressed his condolences and apologized for having treated the matter mockingly, while FernandaVaal issued a statement expressing respect for the family, but clarifying that she would not retract her statements or accept blame.

== Mental health ==
In October 2023, after several months of absence on social media, he published a video on his YouTube channel in which he spoke about his mental health problems, his diagnosis and how online criticism and "funas" had affected his condition. With his testimony he sought to raise awareness of the importance of seeking professional help.

== Death ==
On 26 October 2026, his representative, Byron Reyes, confirmed his death at the age of 30 through social media. According to media reports, a man was found dead on 25 October 2026 at a residence in the Paseo de las Cumbres neighborhood of Monterrey. The cause of death was suicide by hanging.

The news prompted farewell messages from content creators such as AuronPlay, Ibai Llanos and Spreen. Reyes used his message to criticize the harassment that, in his view, exists on social media; the media noted that there was no official information linking those statements to the causes of death.

== Awards and nominations ==
Year	Award	Category	Result	Ref.
2023	ESLAND Awards	Best content miniseries (Squid Craft Games)	Won	
