= Yanci Urbina =

Salvadoran politician (1964–2022)

Deputy of the Legislative Assembly of El Salvador from San Salvador
- In office 1 May 2018 – 1 May 2021

Personal details
- Born: 1964
- Died: 29 May 2022 (aged 57–58)
- Party: Farabundo Martí National Liberation Front
- Occupation: Politician

Yanci Guadalupe Urbina González (1964 – 29 May 2022) was a Salvadoran politician who served as a member of the Legislative Assembly of El Salvador between 2018 and 2021 for the Farabundo Martí National Liberation Front (FMLN).
