= Supreme Electoral Court (El Salvador) =

Highest electoral authority in El Salvador

Supreme Electoral Tribunal
- Tribunal Supremo Electoral

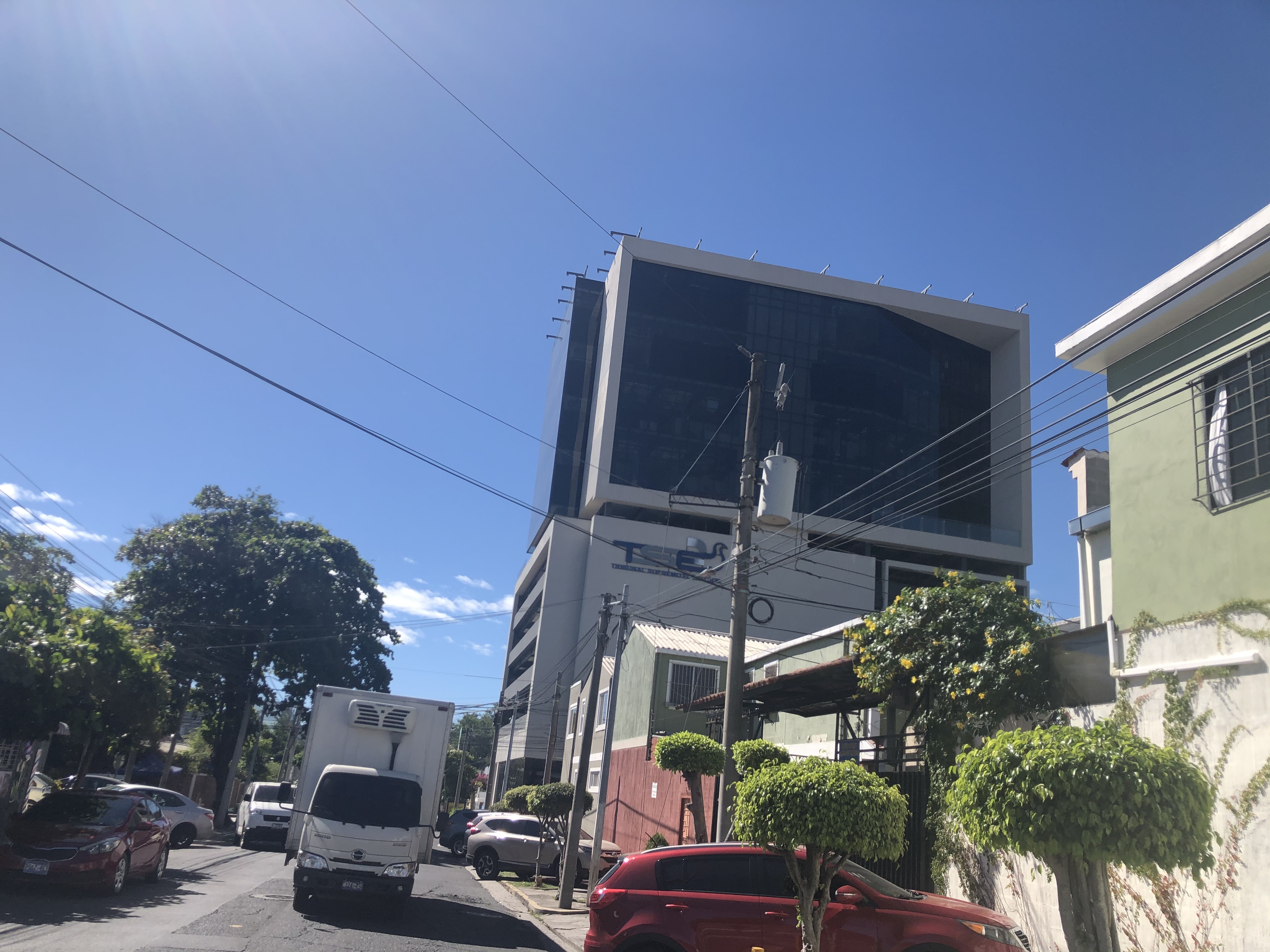
- The headquarters of the TSE

Agency overview
- Formed: 1991
- Preceding agency: Central Election Council
- Jurisdiction: El Salvador
- Headquarters: San Salvador, El Salvador
- Agency executive: Roxana Soriano de Viaud, President
- Website: http://www.tse.gob.sv/

The Supreme Electoral Court (Spanish: Tribunal Supremo Electoral, TSE) is the highest electoral authority in the country of El Salvador.

== Composition ==
Article 208 of the constitution of El Salvador established the Supreme Electoral Court. It consists of five justices, unaffiliated with any political party, who serve give year terms. The justices are chosen by the Legislative Assembly. Two of the justices are nominated by the Supreme Court of Justice. Before 2026, the remaining three justices were nominated by the three political parties that received the most votes in the prior legislative election; after a constitutional reform, the remaining three justices were nominated by a "general and public process" ("proceso general y público").

=== 2024–2029 term ===
Title	Magistrate	Alternate
President	Roxana Saledonia Soriano de Viaud	Karen Elizabeth González de Girón
Judge	Francisco Rubén Alvarado Fuentes	René Amílcar Claros
Judge	Cecilia María Marroquín Castro	Irvin Antonio Castillo López
Judge	Karla Cecilia Guandique de Miranda	Mario Antonio Alas Ramírez
Judge	Sofía Guadalupe Paniagua Meléndez	Francisco Fernando Molina Castro

== History ==
=== Central Electoral Council ===
The 1950 constitution of El Salvador established a Central Electoral Council (Spanish: Consejo Central de Elecciones, CCE) as the "highest authority of electoral matters". It was formed of three members and three deputies, all chosen by the Legislative Assembly for a period of three years from lists proposed by the Supreme Court and the executive branch. The 1962 constitution maintained the same structure. However, this structure was criticised as leading to electoral processes falling under the control of the executive branch, and led to accusations of political bias.

The constitution of 15 December 1983 changed the way that the Central Electoral Council was appointed; it stated that the three members of the Council would be chosen by the Legislative Assembly, with one each being chosen from slates proposed by the three political parties or coalitions with the largest vote share in the last presidential elections. This is the same set of procedures taken for the three political members of the Court today.

=== Civil War-era reforms ===
In April 1991, during the negotiations between the government of El Salvador and the Farabundo Martí National Liberation Front to end the Salvadoran Civil War, an agreement was reached to reform various articles of the Constitution. One of these reforms was the conversion of the Central Electoral Council into the Supreme Electoral Court, and the addition of the two non-partisan members onto the makeup of the Court.

The first challenge the new Court faced was the 1994 Salvadoran general election. Whilst the International Foundation for Electoral Systems' observers found that "the El Salvador voting process was conducted in an orderly, peaceful and transparent fashion which permitted the popular will of the Salvadoran people to be expressed", concerns were also raised about the number of voter applications the Court rejected, often due to lack of documentation.

The IFES report also recommended that El Salvador institute a new unitary document for voter registration and identification, which it called at the time a Citizens Voting and Identification Document (Spanish: Sistema de Identificación Ciudadana y Electoral). Whilst efforts started towards this process in 1994, it was not until the 2004 elections that the Unique Identity Document (Spanish: Documento Único de Identidad) substituted the previous electoral cards. The 2013 Electoral Code states that the Unique Identity Document forms the complete basis of the electoral register, and information on all citizens who own one is given to the Court to establish their voter registration.

=== Modern day ===
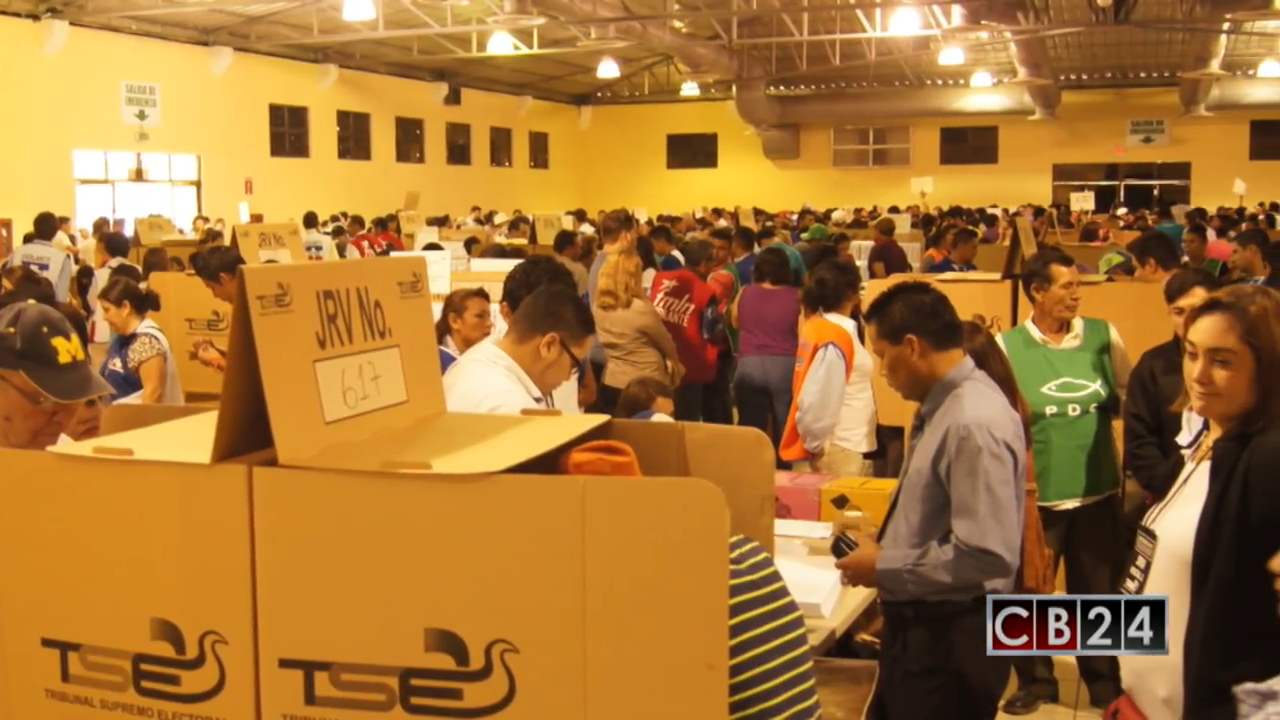
Voters in El Salvador voting at a polling station in 2019

In 2019, Dora Esmeralda Martínez de Barahona, was chosen as the first woman President of the Court, after being proposed by the Grand Alliance for National Unity.

In April 2020, the Court announced plans to continue the 2021 elections to schedule, with additional measures put in place to ensure voters and polling staff would not be put in danger by the coronavirus pandemic. It was announced in May 2020 that the Court would ask for an additional US$5,000,000 to put these measures in place. This funding would be additional to the existing US$45,000,000 approved by the Legislative Assembly for the 2021 elections.
