= Félix Ulloa =

Vice President of El Salvador since 2019

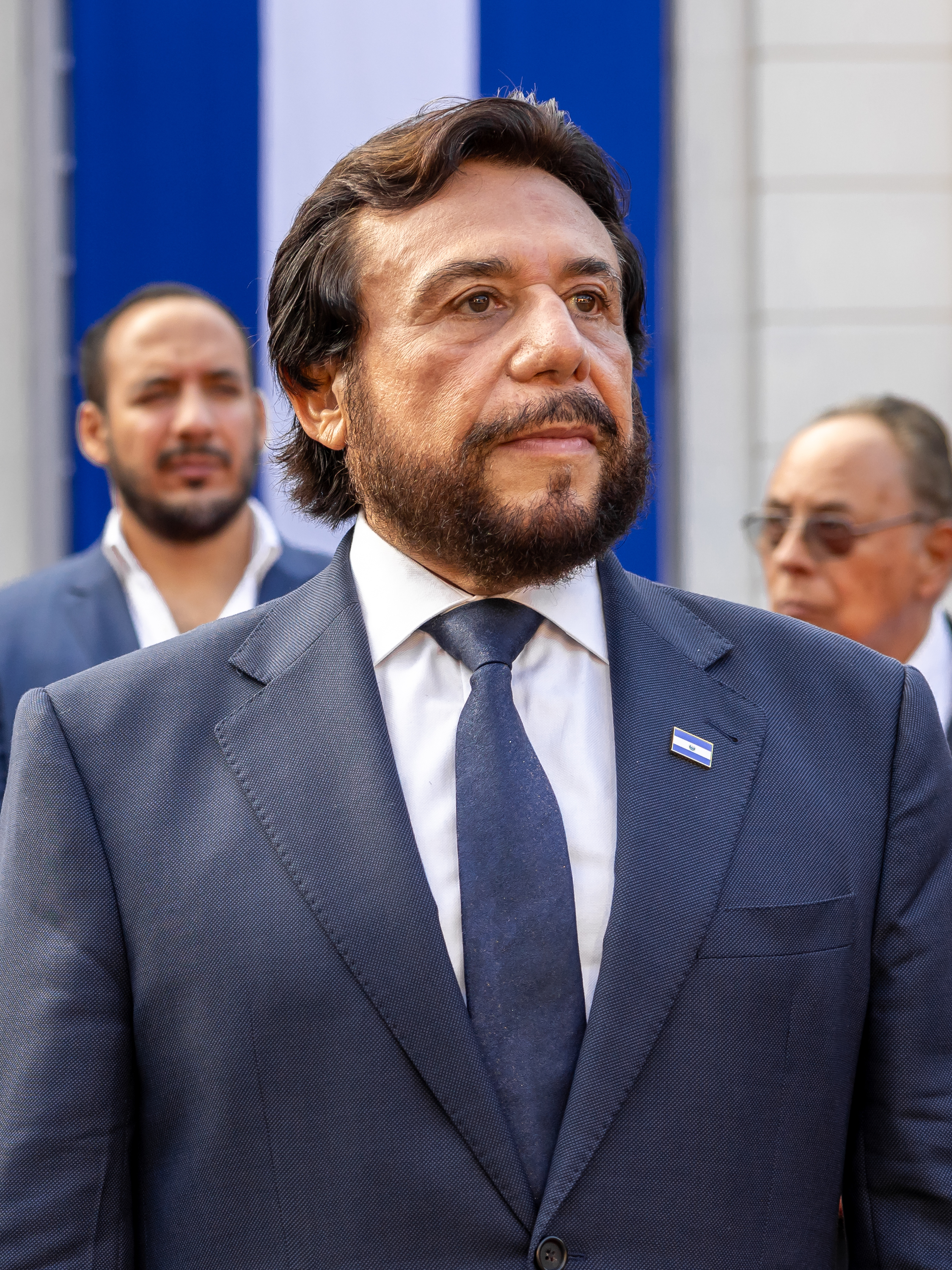
- Ulloa in 2025

50th Vice President of El Salvador
- Incumbent
- Assumed office 1 June 2019
- President: Nayib Bukele
- Preceded by: Óscar Ortiz

Personal details
- Born: 6 April 1951 (age 75) Chinameca, El Salvador
- Party: Nuevas Ideas (from 2023); Independent (until 2023)
- Spouse: Lilian Alvarenga de Ulloa (m. 1973)
- Children: 3
- Parent: Félix Ulloa Sr. (father)
- Education: Complutense University of Madrid (JD)
- Website: www.presidencia.gob.sv/vicepresidencia

Félix Augusto Antonio Ulloa Garay (born 6 April 1951) is a Salvadoran politician, speaker, professor, and lawyer who has been the 50th Vice President of El Salvador since 2019. Prior to his tenure as vice president, he worked as a lawyer and university professor.

== Early life and education ==
Félix Ulloa was born in Chinameca, El Salvador, on 6 April 1951, to Félix Ulloa Sr.. and Margarita Garay. His father, the rector of the University of El Salvador, was murdered in 1980. He graduated from the Complutense University of Madrid with a law degree in 1979, and conducted postgraduate studies at the Institute International D'administration Publique and Humphrey School of Public Affairs. He graduated with a degree in banking and finance from the Technological University of El Salvador.

In 1973, Ulloa was president of the Student Electoral Tribunal of the General Association of Salvadoran University Students. He was also a leader in the Salvadoran Social Security Institute Workers' Union.

== Career ==
=== Legal ===
During the Salvadoran Civil War Ulloa was a lawyer for the National Union of Salvadoran Workers. He and other lawyers founded the Institute of Legal Studies of El Salvador, which Ulloa was president of multiple times. He was a political science professor at Universidad del Salvador and a law professor at Central American University, San Salvador.

The Supreme Electoral Court was established as part of the Chapultepec Peace Accords. Ulloa was elected as magistrate of the tribunal. He participated in election monitoring in over twenty countries. He was an expert for the United Nations Department of Political Affairs' electoral assistance division.

In Haiti, Morocco, and Nicaragua Ulloa was resident director of the National Democratic Institute for over ten years.

=== Politics ===
Ulloa was a member of the National Revolutionary Movement Party, which his father founded, and served on its political commission.

In the 2019 election he was Nayib Bukele's vice presidential running mate and their ticket won. Bukele and Ulloa registered as candidates for the 2024 election with Nuevas Ideas on 25 June 2023, despite the constitutional provisions limiting the president and vice-president to one term. He was granted a leave of absence by the legislature on 30 November, in order to campaign for reelection.

Ulloa attended the coronation of Charles III and Queen Camilla.

U.S. Senator Chris Van Hollen met with Ulloa to discuss the Kilmar Abrego Garcia and his internment at the Terrorism Confinement Center.

In August 2020, Bukele tasked Ulloa with studying the constitutional reform that eliminated presidential term limits and increased the term from 5 to 6 years. Ulloa has supported the idea of Bukele serving long-term in El Salvador, saying, "The president is young, meaning he can continue for two or three more terms, as long as the people keep electing him."

== Personal life ==
Ulloa married Lilian Alvarenga, with whom he had three children, in 1973.

== Political positions ==
Ulloa defended the mass hearings of up to 900 people used for suspected gang members and lowering the age by which a person can be tried as an adult from 16 to 12. He compared Bukele's allies on the Supreme Court of Justice of El Salvador to U.S. President Donald Trump's appointments to the Supreme Court of the United States. In 2026, Ulloa denounced the killings of 41,000 Salvadorans by gangs from 2009 to 2019 as a "genocide".

== Honours ==
- Honorable Order of Kentucky Colonels
- SICA: Grand Cross of the Order of Francisco Morazán (25 September 2023)

== Bibliography ==
- Political Finances in Post Conflict Societies
- Elections in the Americas

== Works cited ==
=== News ===
- "Vicepresidente Ulloa recibe la Condecoración Parlamento Centroamericano, Francisco Morazán". Diario la Huella. 25 September 2023. Archived from the original on 28 September 2023.
- Campos, Gabriel (30 November 2023). "Asamblea otorga permiso a Bukele para que realice campaña y ratifica a designada presidencial". La Prensa Gráfica. Archived from the original on 1 December 2023.
- Campos, Gabriel (26 June 2023). "Nuevas Ideas dio a conocer inscripción de Bukele y Ulloa como precandidatos para elecciones presidenciales". La Prensa Gráfica. Archived from the original on 10 January 2024.
- Magaña, Yolanda; Jalonick, Mary; Brown, Matt (16 April 2025). "Maryland senator meets with El Salvador's vice president in push for Abrego Garcia's release". PBS. Archived from the original on 2 July 2025.
- Maldonado, Javier (5 May 2023). "Vicepresidente salvadoreño sostiene encuentro con rey Carlos III antes de su coronación". El Mundo. Archived from the original on 6 May 2023.
- Montoya, Angeline (15 August 2022). "Felix Ulloa, vice president of El Salvador: 'There are innocent victims in every war'". Le Monde. Archived from the original on 3 April 2023.
- Nawaz, Amna; Aranda, Teresa (2 February 2024). "El Salvador's vice president discusses controversial crackdown on gangs, upcoming election". PBS. Archived from the original on 2 July 2025.

=== Web ===
- "Félix Ulloa: Vicepresidente de la República de El Salvador". President of El Salvador. Archived from the original on 2 July 2025.

Political offices
Preceded by Óscar Ortiz	Vice President of El Salvador; 2019–present	Incumbent
