= History of El Salvador =

The history of El Salvador begins with several distinct groups of Mesoamerican people, especially the Pipil, the Lenca and the Maya. In the early 16th century, the Spanish Empire conquered the territory, incorporating it into the Viceroyalty of New Spain ruled from Mexico City. In 1821, El Salvador achieved independence from Spain as part of the First Mexican Empire, only to further secede as part of the Federal Republic of Central America two years later. Upon the republic's independence in 1841, El Salvador became a sovereign state until forming a short-lived union with Honduras and Nicaragua called the Greater Republic of Central America, which lasted from 1895 to 1898.

In the 20th century, El Salvador endured chronic political and economic instability characterized by coups, revolts, and a succession of authoritarian rulers caused by the intervention of the United States. Persistent socioeconomic inequality and civil unrest culminated in the devastating Salvadoran Civil War in the 1980s, which was fought between the military-led government and a coalition of left-wing guerrilla groups. The conflict ended in 1992 with a negotiated settlement that established a multiparty constitutional republic, which remains in place to this day.

El Salvador's economy was historically dominated by agriculture, beginning with the indigo plant (añil in Spanish), the most important crop during the colonial period, and followed thereafter by coffee, which by the early 20th century accounted for 90 percent of export earnings.

== Pre-Columbian history ==
El Salvador and Central America before the Spanish colonization of the Americas

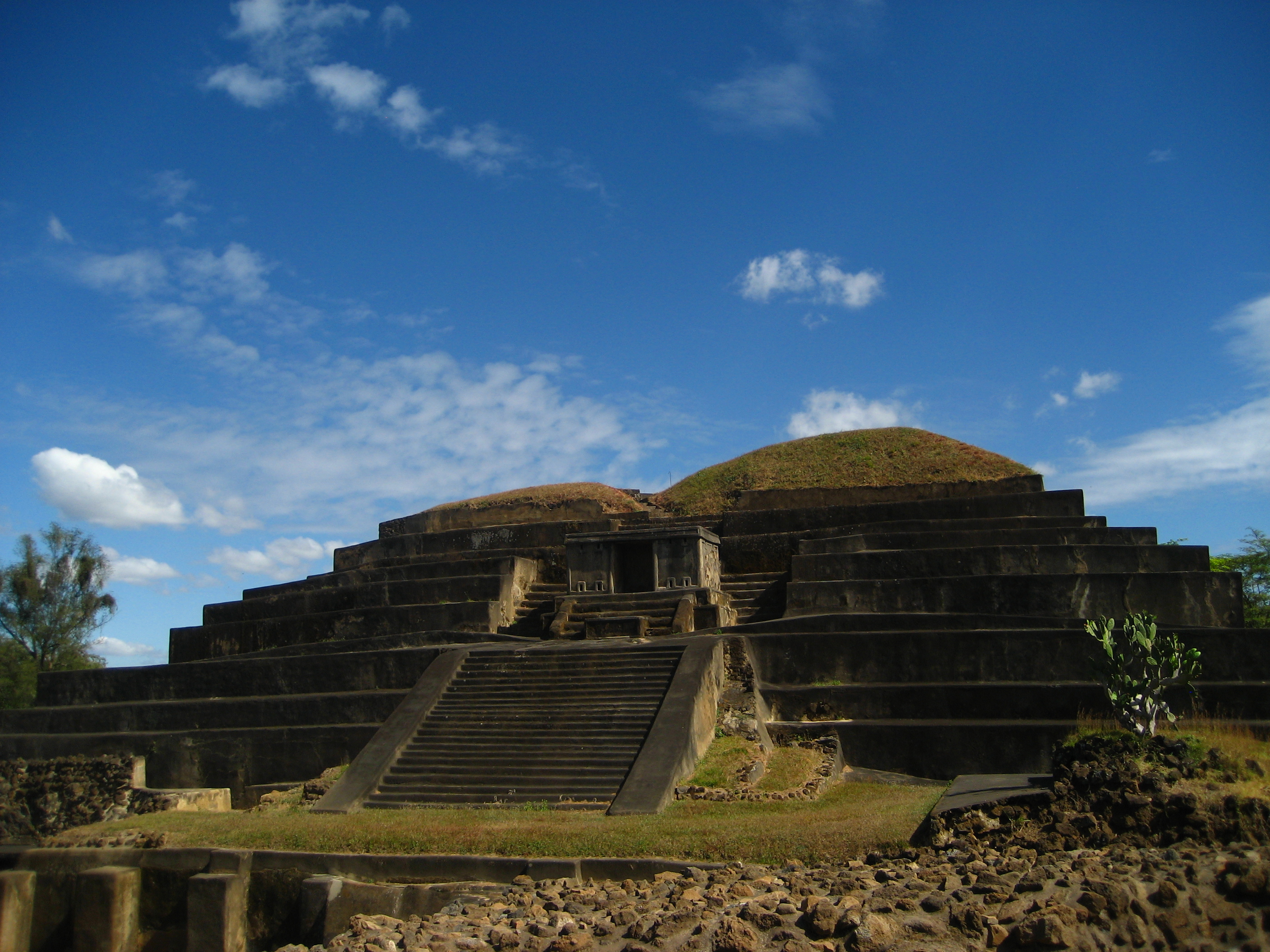
Tazumal ruins in Santa Ana, El Salvador

Before the Spanish conquest, the area that is known as El Salvador was composed of three indigenous states and several principalities. In central El Salvador were the indigenous inhabitants, the Pipils, or the Pipiles, a tribe of nomadic Nahua people that were settled there for a long time. The Pipil strongly resisted Spanish efforts to extend their dominion southward.

The eastern region was populated and governed by the Lenca people, while the northern zone of the Lempa River was populated and governed by the Chʼortiʼ, a Mayan people. Their culture was similar to that of their Aztecs and Maya neighbors.

Several archaeological sites dating to 1400 years ago have been discovered preserved beneath 6 m (20 ft) of volcanic ash.

== Spanish conquest (1524–1525) ==
The first Spanish attempt to control El Señorío of Cuzcatlán failed in 1524, when Pedro de Alvarado was forced to retreat by Pipil warriors led by King Atlácatl and Prince Atonal in the Battle of Acajutla. In 1525, he returned and succeeded in bringing the district under control of the Audiencia of Mexico. Land- Environmental Impact was dry and cold around this time

== Spanish colonial period (1525–1821) ==
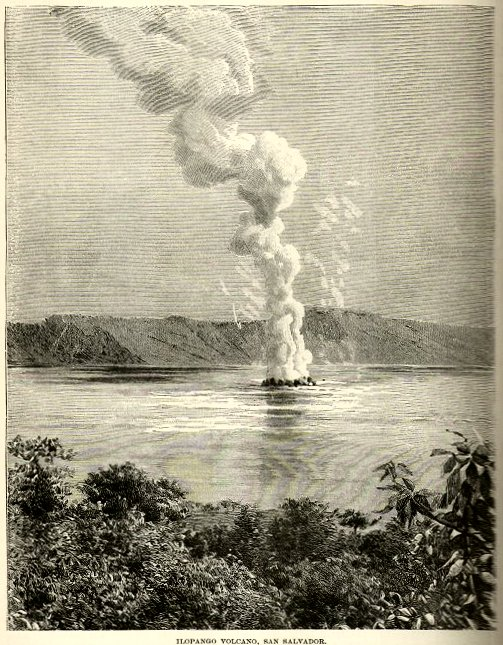
The eruption of Ilopango, 1891

After the Spanish conquest, the region became part of the Captaincy General of Guatemala. Pedro de Alvarado was the first governor, a position he held until his death in 1541. The area was briefly (from 1538 to 1543) under the authority of a short-lived Real Audiencia of Panama, after which most of Central America was placed under a new Real Audiencia of Guatemala. During this period, the region was divided into the province of San Salvador, the province of San Miguel, and the province of Izalcos.

In 1579 the province of San Salvador became an alcaldía mayor (great mayor's office). In 1786 it became an intendancy and in 1821 it became a province with a provincial council. In 1824, San Salvador and Sonsonate were united into the State of Salvador (within the Federal Republic of Central America).

Beginning in the late sixteenth century, the cultivation of indigo became a major part of the Salvadoran economy, spreading particularly in the center, east, and along the coast, along with other cash crops such as sugar. The hazardous working conditions on indigo plantations in conjunction with the aggressive recruitment of labor from villages, disease brought by Spaniards, and the loss of communal lands (ejidos) led to a gradual decline in the indigenous populations of these regions over the course of the colonial period, as their communities disintegrated and they assimilated into Ladino society. The northern border regions of the country experienced a similar phenomenon due to the spread of cattle ranching. On the other hand, indigenous communities survived more intact in the west of the country, where the economy was based around cacao and balsam and protected from cattle ranching and disease, allowing the preservation of indigenous agriculture and by consequence their social structures, language and identity.

== Struggle for independence (1821–1841) ==
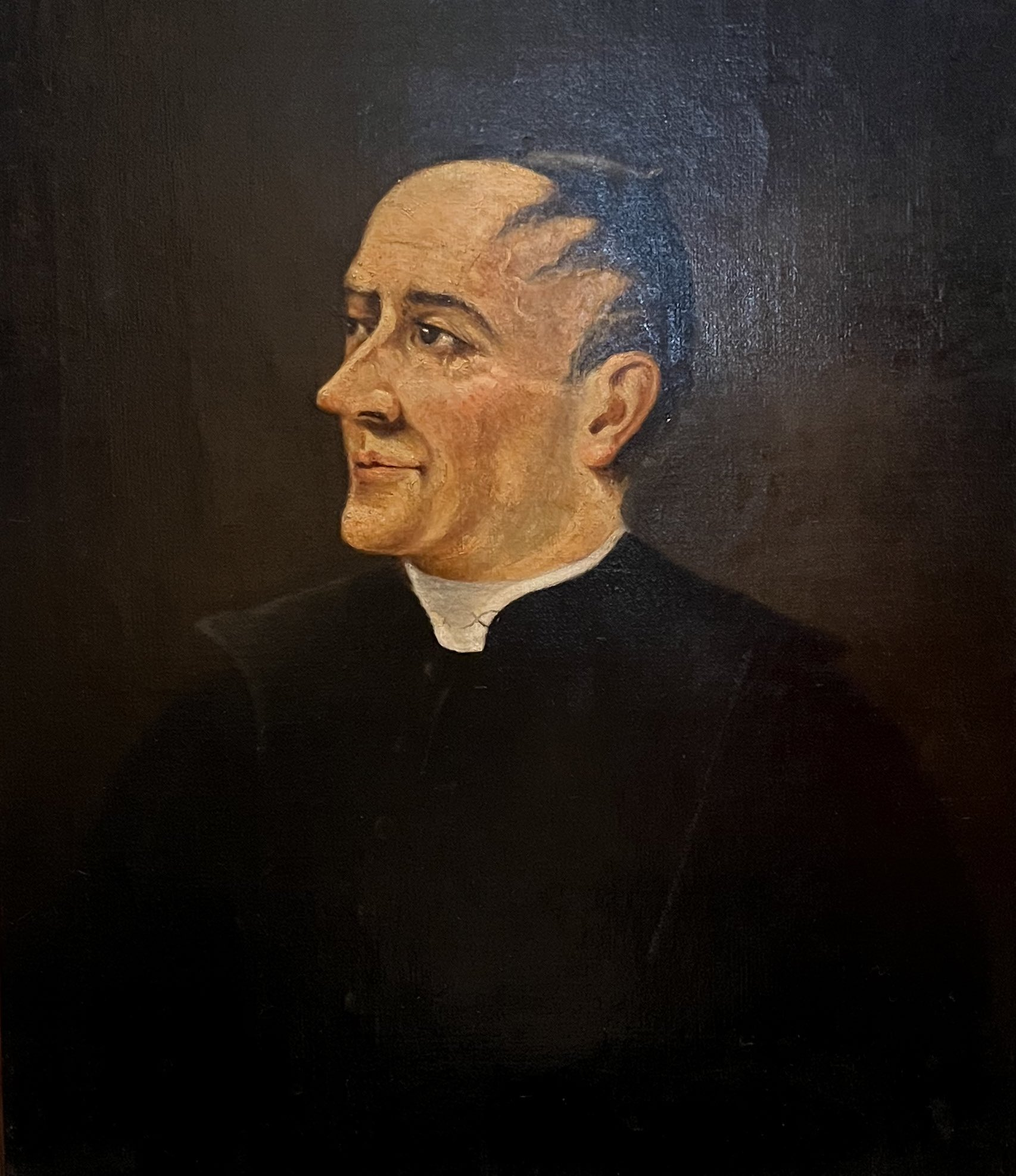
José Matías Delgado y de León, intellectual leader of the Salvadoran independence movement

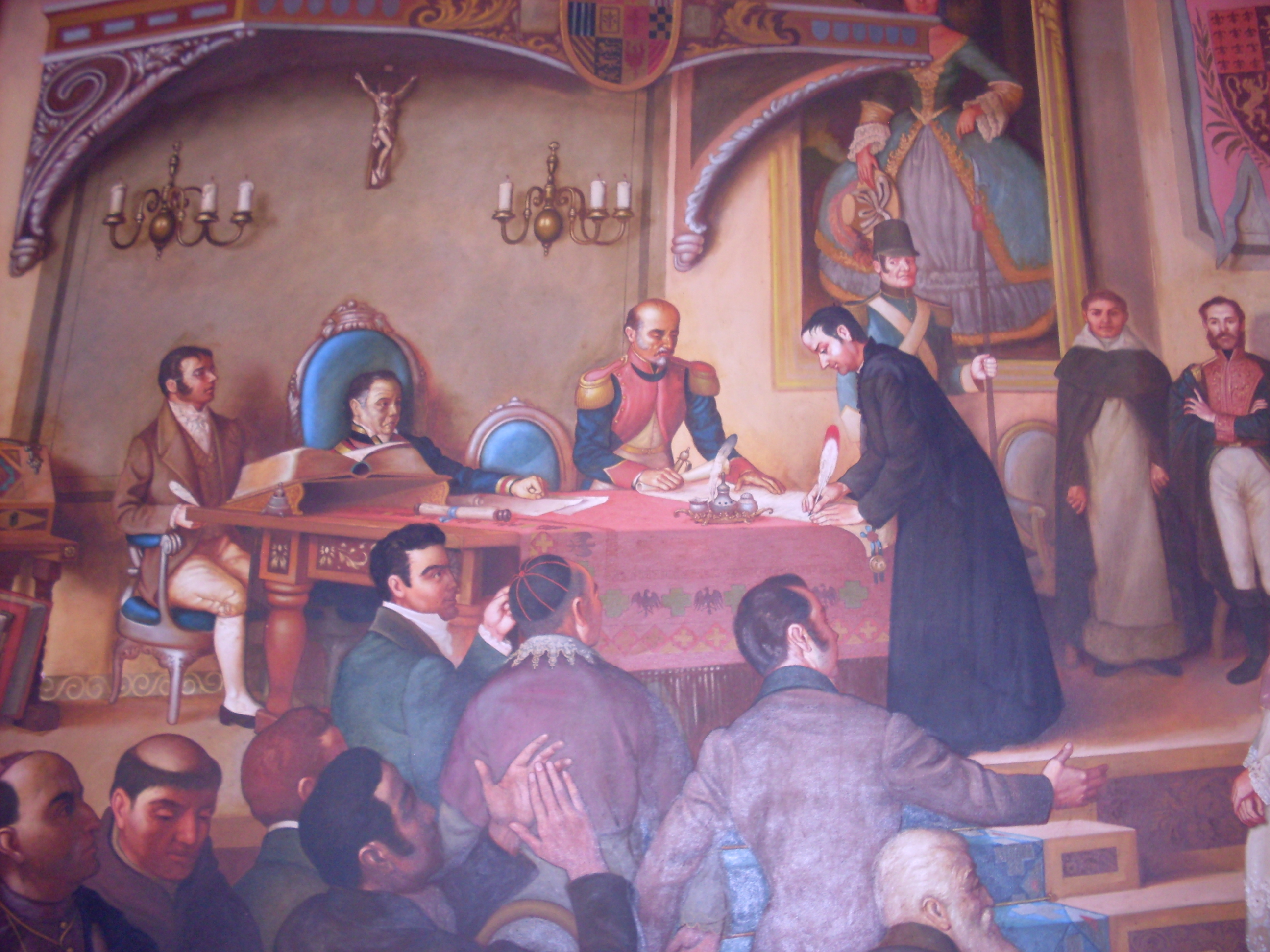
José Matías Delgado At the time of signing the Central American act of independence, in a representation of the meeting of September 15, 1821 of the Chilean painter Luis Vergara Ahumada.

In the early 19th century, Napoleon's occupation of Spain led to the outbreak of revolts across Spanish America. All of the fighting by those seeking independence was done in the center of New Spain from 1810 to 1821, in what is currently central Mexico. After the viceroy was defeated in Mexico City in 1821, news of the independence was sent to all the territories of New Spain including the intendancies of the former Captaincy General of Guatemala.

The public proclamation was done through the 1821 Act of Independence of Central America. After the declaration of independence, the parliament of New Spain intended to establish a commonwealth whereby the King of Spain, Ferdinand VII, would also be Emperor of New Spain, but in which both countries would be governed by separate laws and with their own legislative offices. Should the king refuse the position, the law provided for another member of the House of Bourbon to accede to the throne of New Spain. Ferdinand VII, however, did not recognize the independence of New Spain and said that Spain would not allow any other European prince to take the throne of New Spain.

Parliament proclaimed Agustín de Iturbide emperor of New Spain on 19 May 1822 and renamed New Spain as the Mexican Empire. The territory of the Mexican Empire included the continental intendancies and provinces of New Spain proper, including those of the former Captaincy General of Guatemala.

El Salvador, fearing incorporation into Mexico, petitioned the United States government for statehood. But in 1823, a revolution in Mexico ousted Emperor Agustín de Iturbide and a new Mexican congress voted to allow the Central American intendancies to decide their own fate. That year, the Federal Republic of Central America (FRCA) was formed of the five Central American intendancies under General Manuel José Arce. The intendancies became states under the FRCA.

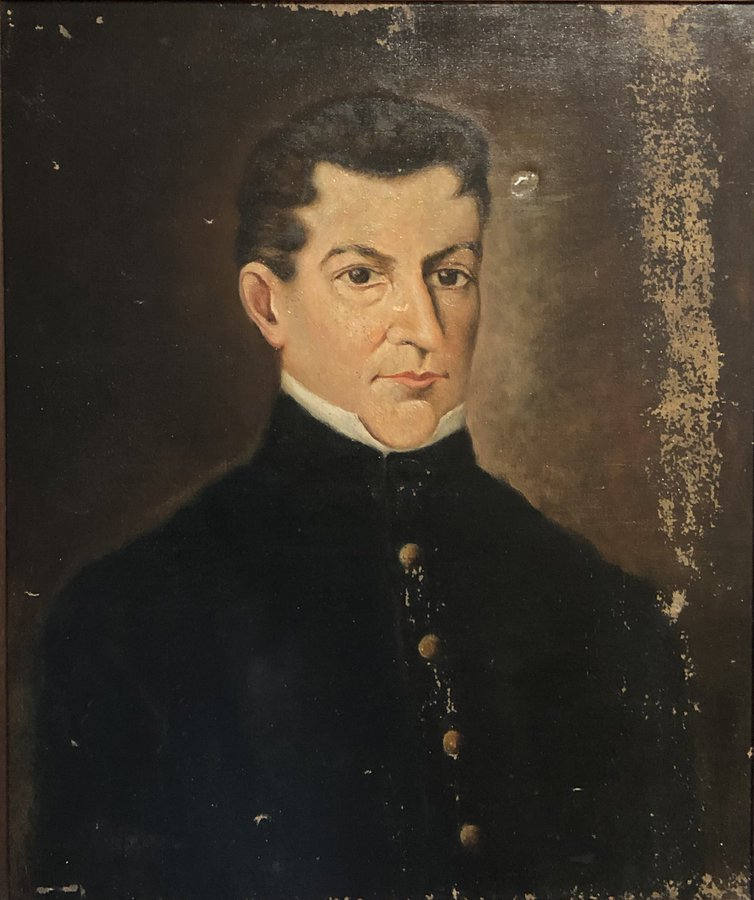
General Manuel José Arce. Decorated Salvadoran independence leader and president of the Federal Republic of Central America from 1825 to 1829.

In 1832, Anastasio Aquino led an indigenous revolt against criollos and mestizos in Santiago Nonualco, a small town in the province of La Paz. The source of the discontent of the indigenous people was the constant abuse and the lack of land to cultivate. The problem of land distribution has been the source of many political conflicts in Salvadoran history.

The FRCA was dissolved in February 1841, and El Salvador gained recognition as an independent republic on 18 February 1841.

== Rise of the oligarchy ==
In the early 19th century, El Salvador's economy depended on the production of a single export crop, indigo. This led wealthy landowners to be attracted to certain lands while leaving other lands, especially those around former volcanic eruptions, to the poor and indigenous communities for subsistence farming. In the late 19th century, natural indigo was replaced by synthetic chemical dyes. The landed elite replaced this crop with a newly demanded product, coffee.

The lands that had been left by the wealthy landowners to the poor and indigenous communities were suddenly quite valuable. The elite-controlled legislature and president passed vagrancy laws that removed people from their land and the great majority of Salvadorans became landless, as their former lands were absorbed into the new coffee plantations (fincas). Historian Héctor Lindo-Fuentes asserts that "the parallel process of state-building and expansion of the coffee industry resulted in the formation of an oligarchy that was to rule El Salvador during the twentieth century."

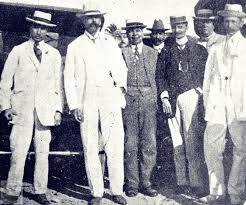
Don Rafael Guirola Duke, President Dr. Manuel Enrique Araujo, Dr. Teodosio Carranza, Dr. David Rosales Dr. Manuel Castro Ramírez and Don Mauricio Duke (Circa 1911)

The coffee industry gave birth to an oligarchy in the late 19th century, which has controlled most of the land and wealth of El Salvador since that time. The Fourteen Families ("las catorce familias")—with names including de Sola, Llach, Hill, Meza-Ayau, Duenas, Dalton, Regalado, Quiñonez, Flores, and Salaverria—is a reference to this oligarchy. For much of this time, this oligarchy acted in a manner similar to the overlords of the feudal system that existed in Europe during the Middle Ages. Although the constitution was amended repeatedly in favor of the oligarchs (in 1855, 1864, 1871, 1872, 1880, 1883, and 1886), several elements remained constant throughout. The wealthy landowners were granted super-majority power in the national legislature and economy. For example, the 1824 constitution provided for a unicameral legislature of 70 deputies, in which 42 seats were set aside for the landowners. The president was selected from the landed elite. Each of El Salvador's 14 regional departments had a governor appointed by the president. The frequent changes in the constitution were mainly due to the attempts of various presidents to hold onto power. For example, President Gerardo Barrios created a new constitution to extend his term limit.

From 1931 until the early 1980s, El Salvador was governed by various dictatorships, but these governments were subservient to the oligarchy, with some officials deriving “modest wealth from bureaucratic corruption”. At that time, the oligarchy consisted of some 20 families which controlled more than 70 percent of El Salvador's coffee production and exports, sugar mills, banks, television and newspapers. Since the end of that war in 1992, the oligarchic families of El Salvador have shifted their focus from agricultural exports to capital investment. Today, the majority of El Salvador's capital is distributed among eight powerful business conglomerates. These companies (Grupo Cuscatlán, Banagrícola, Banco Davivienda El Salvador, Banco de Comercio, Grupo Agrisal, Grupo Poma, Grupo de Sola, and Grupo Hill) dominate the economy of El Salvador and they are largely owned by the descendants of the original 14 families of the coffee oligarchy.

== Military dictatorships (1931–1979) ==
Brigadier general Maximiliano Hernández Martínez

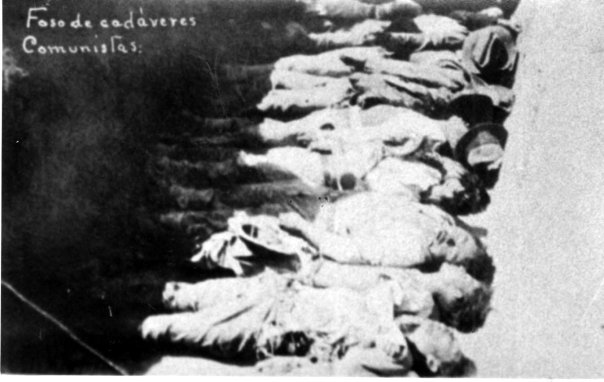
The Aftermath of the 1932 Salvadoran peasant uprising

Between 1931, the year of General Maximiliano Hernández Martínez's coup, and 1944, when he was deposed, there was brutal suppression of rural resistance. The most notable event was the 1932 Salvadoran peasant uprising headed by Farabundo Martí, Chief Feliciano Ama from the Izalco tribe and Chief Francisco "Chico" Sanchez from Juayúa, Izalco subdivision. The government retaliation, commonly referred to as La Matanza (“the slaughter”), followed days of protest. In this 'Matanza', between 10,000 and 40,000 indigenous people and political opponents were murdered, imprisoned or exiled. Federal Research Division historian Richard Haggerty described the coup as a "watershed" event in Salvadoran history, while historian Michael Krennerich described both the coup and the subsequent La Matanza (a January 1932 military-instigated massacre that killed up to 40,000 peasants) as "landmarks in the history of the country".

From 1931 until 1982, the country was ruled by either a military dictator or a joint civilian-military dictatorship and its economy was based primarily on the cultivation and exportation of coffee. These authoritarian governments employed political repression to maintain power, despite the appearance of democracy.

Throughout the 1970s, there was great political instability in El Salvador. In the 1972 presidential election, opponents of military rule united under José Napoleón Duarte, leader of the Christian Democratic Party (PDC). Amid widespread fraud, Duarte's broad-based reform movement was defeated. Subsequent protests and an attempted coup were crushed and Duarte was exiled. These events eroded hope of reform through democratic means and persuaded those opposed to the government that armed insurrection was the only way to achieve change.

== Salvadoran Civil War (1979–1992) ==
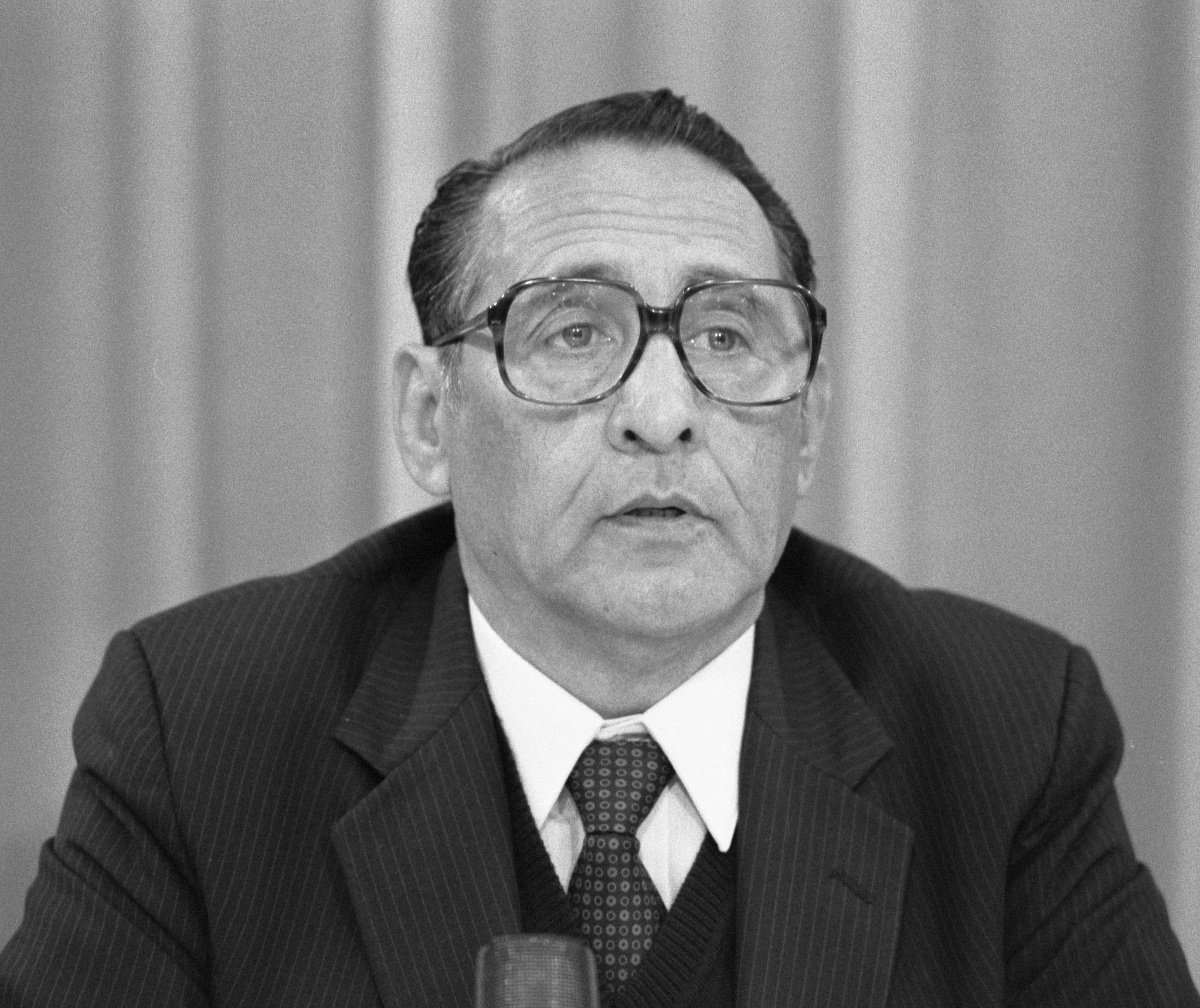
José Napoleón Duarte, 1987

In 1979, the reformist Revolutionary Government Junta took power. Both the far right and the far left political wings disagreed with the new government and increased political violence rapidly developed into a civil war. The initially poorly trained Armed Forces of El Salvador (ESAF) engaged in repression and indiscriminate killings, the most notorious of which was the El Mozote massacre in December 1981. The United States supported the government, while Cuba and other Communist states supported the insurgents—now organized as the Farabundo Martí National Liberation Front (FMLN). The Chapultepec Peace Accords marked the end of the war in 1992, and the FMLN became one of the major political parties.

In accordance with the peace agreements, the constitution was amended to prohibit the military from playing an internal security role except under extraordinary circumstances. Demobilization of Salvadoran military forces generally proceeded on schedule throughout the peace process. The Treasury Police, National Guard, and National Police were abolished, and military intelligence functions were transferred to civilian control. By 1993—nine months ahead of schedule—the military had cut personnel from a war-time high of 63,000 to the level of 32,000 required by the peace accords.

By 1999, ESAF strength stood at less than 15,000, including uniformed and non-uniformed personnel. A purge of military officers accused of human rights abuses and corruption was completed in 1993 in compliance with the Ad Hoc Commission's recommendations. The new doctrine, professionalism, and complete withdrawal from political and economic affairs leave the ESAF as one of the most respected institutions in El Salvador.

More than 35,000 eligible beneficiaries from among the former guerrillas and soldiers who fought in the war received land under the peace accord-mandated land transfer program, which ended in January 1997. The majority of these also received agricultural credits.

The democratic process in El Salvador is delicately balanced, since the Legislative Assembly decreed an amnesty after the Chapultepec Peace Accords. As a result of this amnesty, no one responsible for crimes carried out before, during and after the war has been convicted.

== Post-war period (1992–2019) ==
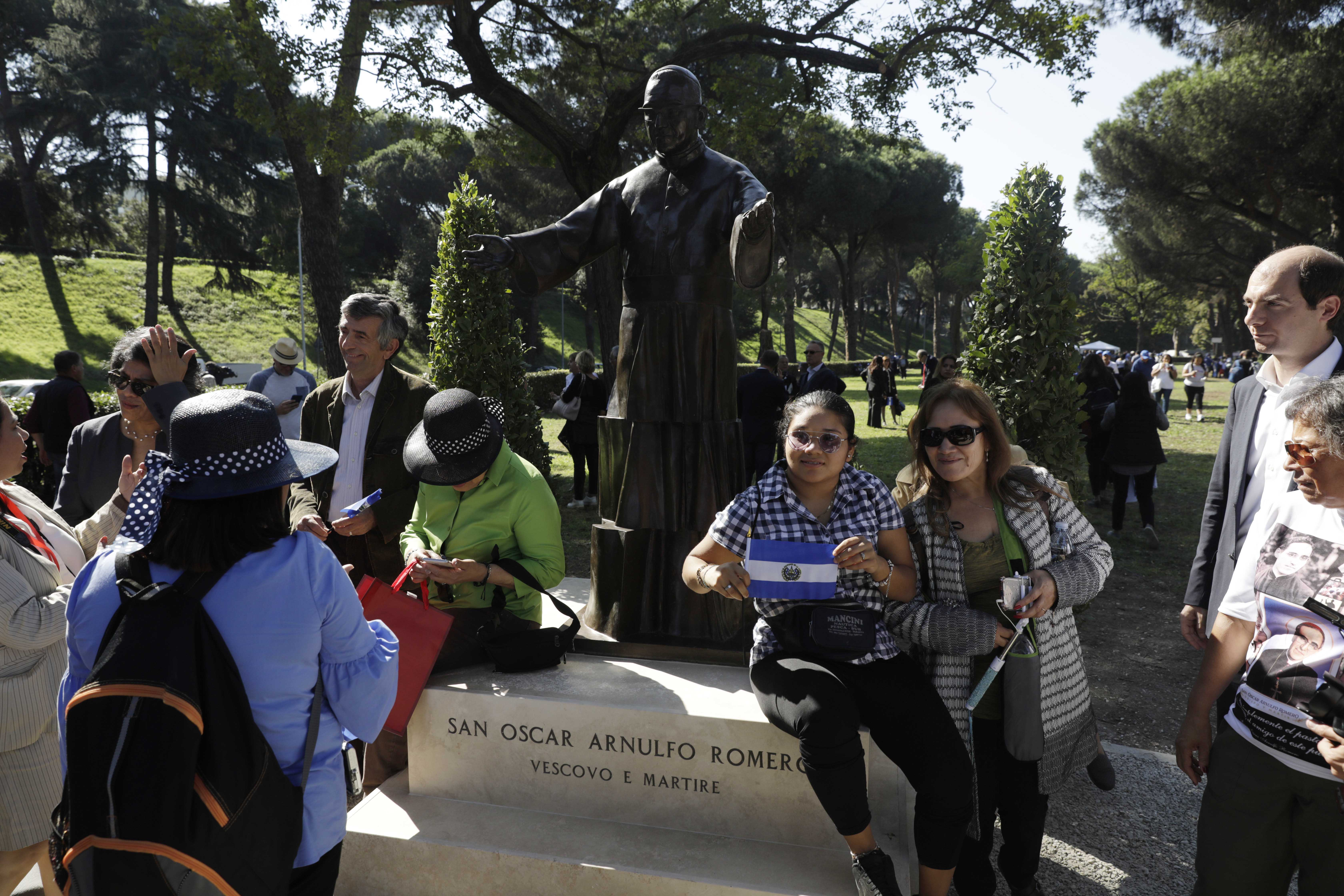
Unveiling of Monsignor Romero's sculpture

The FMLN participated in the 1994 presidential election as a political party. Armando Calderón Sol, the ARENA candidate, won the election. During his rule, Calderón Sol implemented neoliberal policies, including the privatization of several large state enterprises. The FMLN emerged strengthened from the legislative and municipal elections of 1997, where they won the mayoralty of San Salvador. However, internal divisions in the process of electing a presidential candidate damaged the party's image. ARENA again won the presidency in the election of March 7, 1999, with its candidate Francisco Flores Pérez.

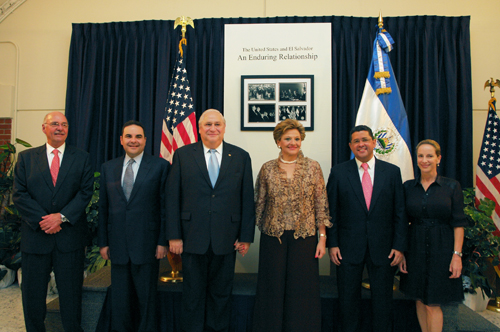
Alfredo Cristiani, Antonio Saca, Armando Calderón Sol, and Francisco Flores Pérez, ARENA's Presidents of El Salvador

In the presidential elections of March 21, 2004, ARENA was victorious again, this time with the candidate Antonio Saca, securing the party's third consecutive term. In the same election, economist Ana Vilma de Escobar became El Salvador's first female vice president. The election result also marked the end of the minor parties (PCN, PDC, and CD), which failed get the 3% required by electoral law to maintain their registration as parties.

In the postwar period, El Salvador experienced problems with organized crime in the form of “maras” or gangs, mainly due to the deportation of Salvadorans from the United States. Two law enforcement programs created to combat this problem–La Mano Dura and Mano Superdura–have failed.

Currently, El Salvador's largest source of foreign currency is remittances sent by Salvadorans from abroad; these have been estimated at over $2 billion US dollars. There are over 2 million Salvadorans living abroad in countries including the United States, Canada, Mexico, Guatemala, Costa Rica, Australia, and Sweden.

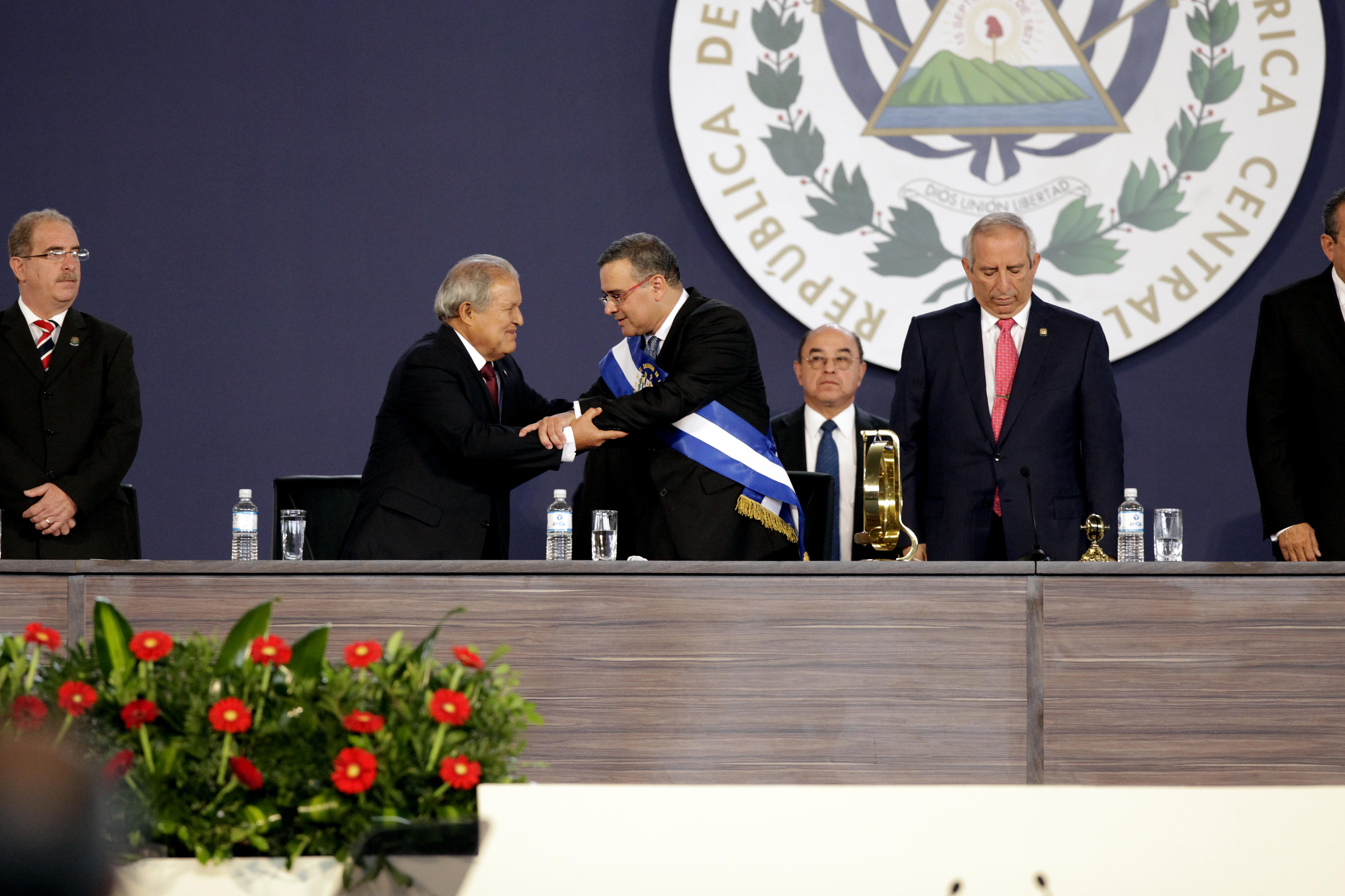
Mauricio Funes and Salvador Sánchez Cerén, the two FMLN presidents of El Salvador

In the 2009 presidential elections, FMLN candidate Mauricio Funes, a former journalist, won the presidency. This was the first victory of a leftist political party in El Salvador's history. Funes took over as president on June 1, 2009, together with Salvador Sánchez Cerén as vice president.

In 2014, Cerén took office as president, after winning the election as the candidate of the left-wing FMLN. Cerén had been a guerrilla leader in the Civil War and is the first ex-rebel to serve as president. Under his leadership, El Salvador became the first country in the world to ban the mining of metal on its territory, for environmental and public health reasons.

=== Corrupt presidents ===
Former President Mauricio Funes fled to Nicaragua in 2014 after being charged with illicit enrichment and money laundering. In 2017, an El Salvador court ruled that Funes and one of his sons had illegally enriched themselves. Funes was still living in Nicaragua as of 2019. Funes was also sentenced in 2023 to 14 years in prison in absentia because of negotiations related to the gang truces he made while serving as president. He was sentenced to an additional six years for tax evasion, and he was also placed under sanctions by the U.S. State Department.

In 2018, former President Antonio Saca was sentenced to 10 years in prison after he pleaded guilty to diverting more than US$300 million in state funds to his own businesses and third parties.

In 2023, former President Salvador Sánchez Cerén was sanctioned by the U.S. State Department for "significant corruption by laundering money" during his tenure as vice president.

== Bukele presidency (2019–) ==
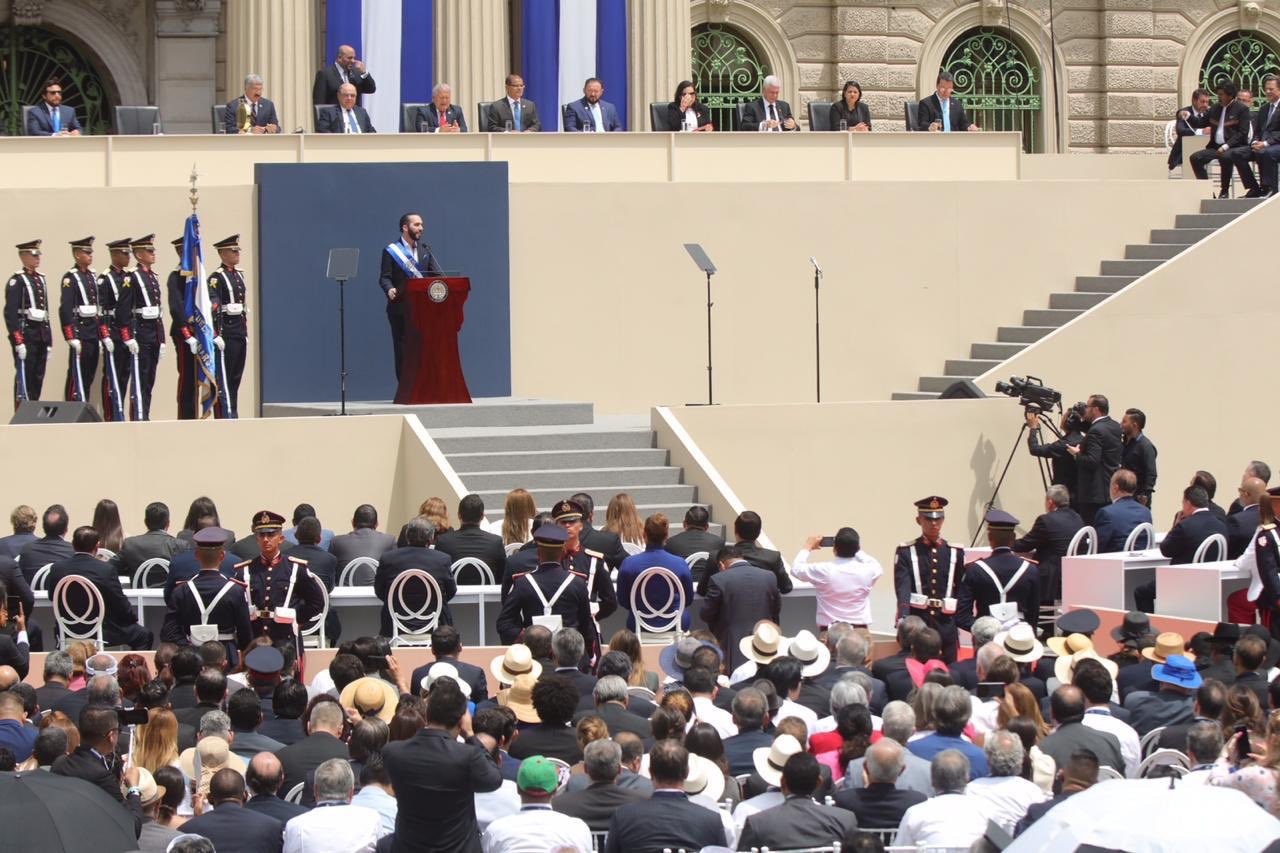
Nayib Bukele talks at his inauguration ceremony

In February 2019, Nayib Bukele, a Millennial who was not aligned with either of the major parties that had dominated the country since the Civil War, was elected president of El Salvador.

According to a report by the International Crisis Group (ICG) 2020, the homicide rate in El Salvador declined by as much as 60 percent since Bukele became president in June 2019. This phenomenon could be related to the informal “non-aggression agreement” between the government and certain of the maras.

President Nayib Bukele remains very popular among the citizens, with approval ratings typically hovering around 90 percent, almost unheard of in presidential politics. El Salvador's legislative elections was an important breakthrough in February 2021. Nuevas Ideas (New Ideas)—the new party founded by Bukele—won around two-thirds of votes with its allies (GANA-New Ideas). Nuevas Ideas won a supermajority of 56 seats in the 84-seat parliament. This supermajority enabled President Bukele to appoint judges and pass laws (for example, to remove presidential term limits). In September 2021, El Salvador's Supreme Court decided to allow Bukele to run for a second term in 2024, despite the constitution prohibiting the president from serving two consecutive terms in office. The decision was organized by judges appointed to the court by President Bukele.

In 2021, El Salvador adopted the Bitcoin as its legal tender under the direction of Bukele. Its value at the time was equivalent to US$52,000. In January 2022, the International Monetary Fund (IMF) urged El Salvador to reverse its decision to make cryptocurrency Bitcoin legal tender. Bitcoin had rapidly lost about half of its value, meaning economic difficulties for El Salvador. President Bukele had announced his plans to build a Bitcoin city at the base of a volcano in El Salvador. In March 2024, BitCoin's value rebounded, exceeding its previous high value to over US$64,700.

In 2022, Salvadoran government initiated a massive fight against criminal gangs and gang-related violence. State of emergency was declared on 27 March. It was extended on 20 July. More than 53,000 suspected gang members were arrested. This has resulted in significant declines in homicide, extortion, and other gang-related crimes.

In January 2024, it was announced that the homicide rate dropped nearly 70% year over year, with 495 homicides in 2022 compared to 154 in 2023.

On 4 February 2024, President Nayib Bukele, won re-election with 84% of the vote in the presidential election. His party Nuevas Ideas (New Ideas) won 58 of the El Salvador parliament's 60 seats. On 1 June 2024, President Nayib Bukele was sworn in for the second five-year term.

As of February 2025, El Salvador had the highest prisoner rate worldwide, with over 1,600 prisoners per 100,000 of the national population. El Salvador’s Cecot mega-prison, officially called the Center for Terrorism Confinement, is considered the largest prison in the Americas with a capacity of 40,000 inmates. The incarcerations have been part of president Bukele’s efforts to reduce high crime rates and gang violence. In March 2025, the United States transferred more than 200 immigrants, alleged members of a Venezuelan gang, to be imprisoned in El Salvador. In 2024, the amount of homicides in El Salvador was record low. The 1.9 homicides per 100,000 in population put it below any other Latin American country.

== See also ==
- List of presidents of El Salvador
- Politics of El Salvador

General:

- History of the Americas
- History of Central America
- History of Latin America
- History of North America
- Spanish colonization of the Americas

== Sources ==
- Haggerty, Richard A., ed. (1990). El Salvador: A Country Study (PDF). Federal Research Division Library of Congress. Washington, D.C.: The Library of Congress.
- Nohlen, Dieter (2005). Elections in the Americas A Data Handbook Volume 1: North America, Central America, and the Caribbean. Oxford, United Kingdom: Oxford University Press. pp. 270–299. ISBN 9780191557934. OCLC 58051010.
