= Alejandro Muñoz Ciudad Real =

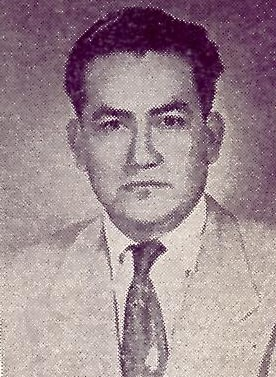
- Born: February 3, 1902; San Salvador, El Salvador
- Died: 1991 (aged 88–89); El Salvador
- Resting place: Cemetery of Distinguished Citizens, San Salvador, El Salvador
- Occupations: Conductor, double bassist
- Title: Director, El Salvador Symphony Orchestra
- Term: 1941–1963

Alejandro Muñoz Ciudad Real was a Salvadoran conductor and music teacher. He was the first Salvadoran director of the El Salvador Symphony Orchestra, and is known as the "father of the symphony orchestra."

== Early life ==
Alejandro Muñoz Ciudad Real was born in San Salvador, El Salvador on February 3, 1902. He began his musical studies alongside his brother, Manuel, and continued his studies in Mexico where he played in the double bass section in the Mexican National Symphony Orchestra founded by Carlos Chávez. Ciudad Real studied with the Mexican composer Jose F. Vazquez.

== El Salvador Symphony Orchestra ==
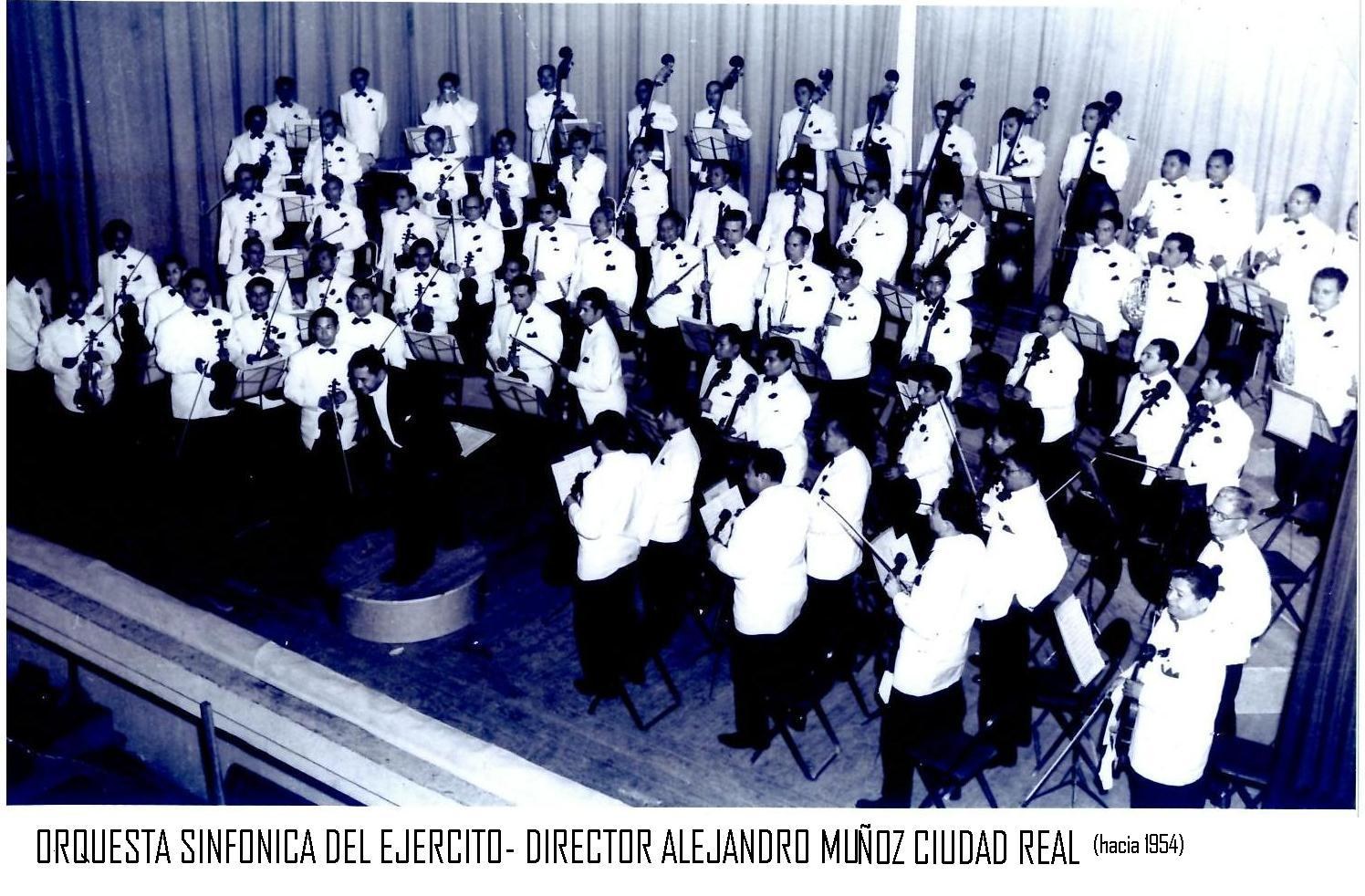
Alejandro Muñoz Ciudad Real with the El Salvador Army Symphony Orchestra

In 1941, Ciudad Real returned to El Salvador from his time studying in Mexico, and became the first Salvadoran director of the El Salvador Symphony Orchestra, which at the time was called "The Band-Orchestra of the Supreme Powers." Prior to Alejandro's appointment as director in 1941, the directors that came before him were all of foreign origin, mostly coming from Europe. In 1950, in the presence of the then-president Óscar Osorio, Ciudad Real told the El Salvador Defense Minister, Colonel Oscar Bolaños that he wanted to remove the band portion from the "Band-Orchestra of the Supreme Powers", and keep the orchestra, essentially separating the two from each other. He told Bolaños he wanted to call the new orchestra: "The Army Symphonic Orchestra" Bolaños accepted the request, and in 1951 the band and orchestra was officially separated, with the band becoming a part of the El Salvador National Guard.

Ciudad Real was the first to perform works of the 20th century in El Salvador. In the 1950s, he premiered multiple works by many notable composers such as Igor Stravinsky, Manuel de Falla, Aaron Copland, Richard Strauss and Sergei Rachmaninoff. Ciudad Real also premiered works from his former conductor Carlos Chávez and his student Esteban Servellón. He had a unique taste for Russian composers, as Ciudad Real would often perform works by Pyotr Ilyich Tchaikovsky and Nikolai Rimsky-Korsakov. Ciudad Real also often arranged pieces by composers to be performed by his orchestra.

In 1960, the Army Symphonic Orchestra under Ciudad Real's direction became a dependency of the Ministry of Education, and became the El Salvador Symphony Orchestra. Ciudad Real would hold the position of director until 1963, when his student Esteban Servellón would succeed him.

== Death and legacy ==
Alejandro Muñoz Ciudad Real died in his home country of El Salvador in 1991. He is buried in the Cementerio de los Ilustres in San Salvador, El Salvador.

In 1999, the El Salvador Symphony Orchestra dedicated the 2nd Annual Festival of Contemporary Music of El Salvador to the late Ciudad Real for his work in conducting and his role in introducing the country to the classical music repertoire.
