= Jorge Saade =

Ecuadorian musician

Jorge Saade (full name: Jorge Saade-Scaff) is a violinist.

== Background ==
Saade was born in Guayaquil, Ecuador. He is a "Gold Medal" graduate of the Antonio Neumane National Conservatory of Music. He is a cum laude graduate from the University of Miami, where he received his bachelor's degree in music. He holds a Master of Music Degree from The Catholic University of America in Washington, D.C., where he studied with violinist and pedagogue Robert Gerle. He was accepted at the Mozarteum Institute in Salzburg, Austria, where he studied with violin virtuoso Ruggiero Ricci. He is of Lebanese background.

== Duo Paganini ==
In 2002 together with renowned Ecuadorian guitarist Julio Almeida, Saade formed the Duo Paganini. About their debut recital in Cologne, Germany, on October 3, 2002, Daniel Reits, music critic for the Kölner Stadt-Anzeiger wrote: "...with the rich and varied program From Paganini to the Andes the artists captivated the audience......the duo impress the audience with a perfect ensemble and artistry.....". The duo's first CD, From Paganini to the Andes, was released during their performance at the Teatro Colón in Buenos Aires, Argentina.

== Recordings ==
In 2005, the Guayaquil Symphony Orchestra released their first compact disc recording entitled Música Académica Ecuatoriana, recorded live at the Guayaquil Teatro Centro de Arte on June 30, 2004, featuring Saade as a guest soloist. The second recording with the Guayaquil Symphony Orchestra under the direction of acclaimed conductor and composer José Serebrier was done live at the Guayaquil Teatro Centro de Arte on May 13, 2005, featuring Saade as a guest soloist with Mozart's Violin Concerto No. 3. Most recently, under the sponsorship of MasterCard-Pacificard of Ecuador, he released Tango, Danzon y Pasillo, recorded live with the Pan-American Symphony Orchestra under the direction of Maestro Sergio Buslje in Washington, D.C..

== Further career ==
Saade served as the Cultural and Press Attaché of the Ecuadorian Embassy and Cultural Representative of Ecuador to the Organization of American States in Washington, D.C. from June 1997 to February 2003.

Currently Saade is the Dean and Founder of the Music School and Director of the Arts Program at the Guayaquil Catholic University, Professor Ad-Honorem of violin and viola at the National Conservatory of Music in Guayaquil, Ecuador, member of the Board of Directors of the Symphonic Foundation and Cultural Advisor of the Washington Symphony Orchestra and the Pan American Symphony Orchestra in Washington, D.C..

For the 2006–2007 season, Saade has been invited to perform with the Glacier Symphony Orchestra in Montana, USA, the El Salvador Symphony Orchestra, the Montevideo Symphony Orchestra in Uruguay, the Bach Camerata from Nicaragua the Ecuadorian National Symphony Orchestra and to perform recitals in Germany, Holland, France, Spain, Poland and the United States.
