= 1927 in El Salvador =

- Decades: 1900s; 1910s; 1920s; 1930s; 1940s
- See also: Other events of 1927; Timeline of Salvadoran history

The following lists events that happened in 1927 in El Salvador.

== Incumbents ==
- President: Alfonso Quiñónez Molina (until 1 March), Pío Romero Bosque (starting 1 March)
- Vice President: Pío Romero Bosque (until 1 March), Gustavo Vides (starting 1 March)

== Events ==
=== January ===
- 9 January – Voters in El Salvador elected National Democratic Party candidate Pío Romero Bosque as President of El Salvador with 192,860 votes and a 100% margin. He was the only candidate.

=== March ===
- 1 March – Pío Romero Bosque was sworn in as President of El Salvador. Gustavo Vides was sworn in as vice president.
- 27 March – C.D. Vendaval Apopa, a Salvadoran football club, was established.

== Births ==
- 6 August – Arturo Armando Molina, politician
