= 1921 in El Salvador =

- Decades: 1900s; 1910s; 1920s; 1930s; 1940s
- See also: Other events of 1921; Timeline of Salvadoran history

The following lists events that happened in 1921 in El Salvador.

== Incumbents ==
- President: Jorge Meléndez
- Vice President: Alfonso Quiñónez Molina

== Events ==
=== June ===
- 19 June – C.D. El Vencedor, a Salvadoran football club, was established.

=== Undated ===
- C.D. Once Berlinés, a Salvadoran football club, was established.

== Births ==
- 2 September – Julio Adalberto Rivera Carballo, politician (d. 1973)

== Deaths ==
- 9 January – Rafael Antonio Gutiérrez, politician (b. 1845)
