= 1922 in El Salvador =

- Decades: 1900s; 1910s; 1920s; 1930s; 1940s
- See also: Other events of 1922; Timeline of Salvadoran history

The following lists events that happened in 1922 in El Salvador.

== Incumbents ==
- President: Jorge Meléndez
- Vice President: Alfonso Quiñónez Molina

== Events ==
=== February ===
- 11 February – C.D. Once Lobos, a Salvadoran football club, was established.

=== Undated ===
- The El Salvador Symphony Orchestra was established.

== Bibliography ==
- Apel, Willi (1969). Harvard Dictionary of Music. Harvard University Press. p. 287. ISBN 978-0-674-37501-7.
