= 1916 in El Salvador =

- Decades: 1890s; 1900s; 1910s; 1920s; 1930s
- See also: Other events of 1916; Timeline of Salvadoran history

The following lists events that happened in 1916 in El Salvador.

== Incumbents ==
- President: Carlos Meléndez Ramírez
- Vice President: Alfonso Quiñónez Molina
