= 1925 in El Salvador =

- Decades: 1900s; 1910s; 1920s; 1930s; 1940s
- See also: Other events of 1925; Timeline of Salvadoran history

The following lists events that happened in 1925 in El Salvador.

== Incumbents ==
- President: Alfonso Quiñónez Molina
- Vice President: Pío Romero Bosque

== Events ==
=== Undated ===
- The El Salvador Olympic Committee was established.

== Births ==
- 8 October – Álvaro Magaña (d. 2001)
- 23 November – José Napoleón Duarte (d. 1990)
