= 1918 in El Salvador =

- Decades: 1890s; 1900s; 1910s; 1920s; 1930s
- See also: Other events of 1918; Timeline of Salvadoran history

The following lists events that happened in 1918 in El Salvador.

== Incumbents ==
- President: Carlos Meléndez Ramírez (until December 21), Alfonso Quiñónez Molina (starting December 21)
- Vice President: Alfonso Quiñónez Molina (until December 21), Vacant (starting December 21)

== Events ==
=== December ===
- 21 December – Carlos Meléndez Ramírez resigned as President and was succeeded by Alfonso Quiñónez Molina as Acting President.
