= 1928 in El Salvador =

- Decades: 1900s; 1910s; 1920s; 1930s; 1940s
- See also: Other events of 1928; Timeline of Salvadoran history

The following lists events that happened in 1928 in El Salvador.

== Incumbents ==
- President: Pío Romero Bosque
- Vice President: Gustavo Vides

== Events ==
=== January ===
- January – Voters in El Salvador elected the National Democratic Party to all 42 seats in the country's legislature. No results were published.

=== Undated ===
- C.D. Tehuacan, a Salvadoran football club, was established.
