= 1924 in El Salvador =

- Decades: 1900s; 1910s; 1920s; 1930s; 1940s
- See also: Other events of 1924; Timeline of Salvadoran history

The following lists events that happened in 1924 in El Salvador.

== Incumbents ==
- President: Alfonso Quiñónez Molina
- Vice President: Pío Romero Bosque

== Births ==
- 29 February – Carlos Humberto Romero, politician (d. 2017)
