= 1920 in El Salvador =

- Decades: 1900s; 1910s; 1920s; 1930s; 1940s
- See also: Other events of 1920; Timeline of Salvadoran history

The following lists events that happened in 1920 in El Salvador.

== Incumbents ==
- President: Jorge Meléndez
- Vice President: Alfonso Quiñónez Molina
