= 1926 in El Salvador =

- Decades: 1900s; 1910s; 1920s; 1930s; 1940s
- See also: Other events of 1926; Timeline of Salvadoran history

The following lists events that happened in 1926 in El Salvador.

== Incumbents ==
- President: Alfonso Quiñónez Molina
- Vice President: Pío Romero Bosque

== Events ==
=== February ===
- 15 February – C.D. Águila, a Salvadoran football club, was established.
