= 1915 in El Salvador =

- Decades: 1890s; 1900s; 1910s; 1920s; 1930s
- See also: Other events of 1915; Timeline of Salvadoran history

The following lists events that happened in 1915 in El Salvador.

== Incumbents ==
- President: Alfonso Quiñónez Molina (until 1 March), Carlos Meléndez Ramírez (starting 1 March)
- Vice President: Carlos Meléndez Ramírez (until 1 March), Alfonso Quiñónez Molina (starting 1 March)

== Events ==
=== January ===
- 12 January – Voters in El Salvador elected National Democratic Party candidate Carlos Meléndez Ramirez as president by a margin of 100%, but no results were published and he ran unopposed.

=== March ===
- 1 March – Carlos Meléndez Ramírez was sworn in as President of El Salvador. Alfonso Quiñónez Molina was sworn in as vice president.

=== May ===
- 10 May – La Prensa Gráfica, a Salvadoran newspaper, began publication.
