= Jaime Portillo =

Salvadoran footballer (born 1947)

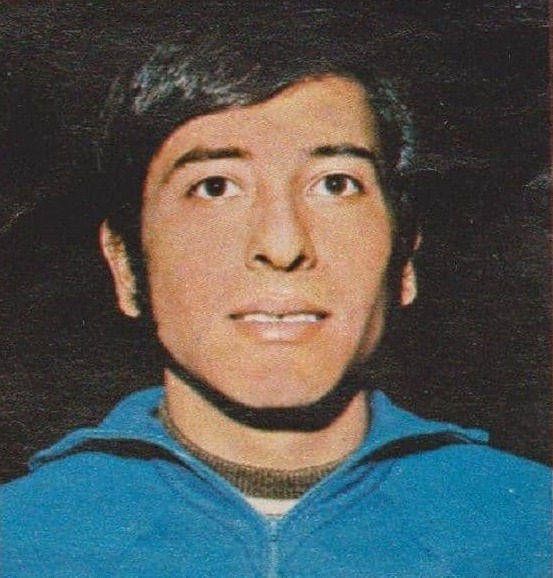
- Portillo in 1970

Personal information
- Full name: Jaime Rafael Martínez Portillo
- Date of birth: September 18, 1947 (age 79)
- Place of birth: El Salvador
- Height: 1.68 m (5 ft 6 in)
- Position: Striker

Youth career
- 1964-1966: Once Berlinés

Senior career*
Years	Team	Apps	(Gls)
1967–1972	Alianza		
1973-1974	FAS		
1974-1975	Platense		
1976-1983	Alianza		
1984-1985	Baygon ADET		

International career
1970–1972	El Salvador	8	(0)
- * Club domestic league appearances and goals as of 2011

Jaime Rafael Martínez Portillo (born 18 September 1947) is a retired footballer from El Salvador. During his career he played for Once Berlinés, Alianza F.C., C.D. FAS, Platense and Baygon ADET.

== International career ==
Portillo represented his country at the 1970 FIFA World Cup in Mexico and in 1 FIFA World Cup qualification match.
