= 1931 in El Salvador =

- Decades: 1910s; 1920s; 1930s; 1940s; 1950s
- See also: Other events of 1931; Timeline of Salvadoran history

The following lists events that happened in 1931 in El Salvador.

== Incumbents ==
- President: Pío Romero Bosque (until 1 March), Arturo Araujo (1 March - 2 December), Civic Directory (2 December - 4 December), Maximiliano Hernández Martínez (starting 4 December)
- Vice President: Gustavo Vides (until 1 March), Maximiliano Hernández Martínez (1 March - 2 December), Vacant (starting 2 December)

== Events ==
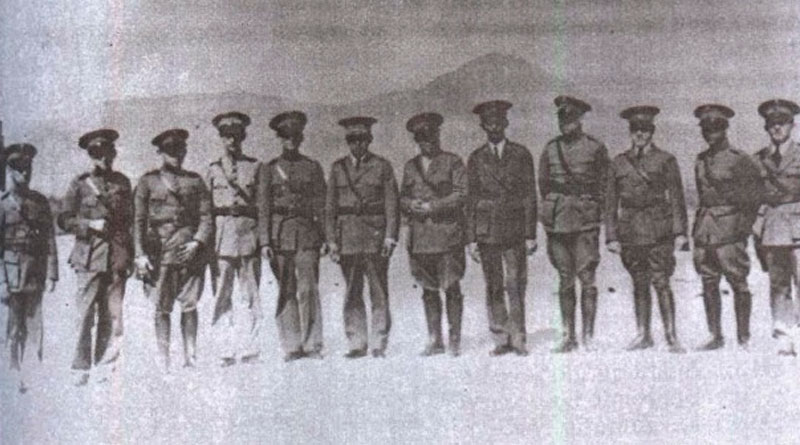
The Civic Directory of El Salvador.

=== January ===
- 11–13 January – Voters in El Salvador voted Labor candidate Arturo Araujo as president with 46.65% of the vote in El Salvador's first free and fair election.

=== March ===
- 1 March – Arturo Araujo was sworn in as President of El Salvador. Maximiliano Hernández Martínez was sworn in as vice president.

=== December ===
- 2 December – The Armed Forces of El Salvador deposed President Araujo in a military coup d'état and established the Civic Directory.
- 4 December – General Maximiliano Hernández Martínez, previously Vice President of El Salvador under Araujo, became Acting President of El Salvador.
