= Farabundo Martí =

Salvadoran revolutionary and activist

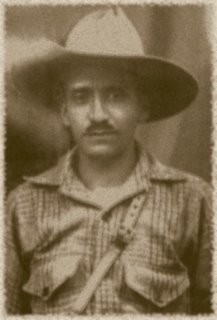
- Martí in 1929
- Born: Faramundo Agustín Martí; 5 May 1893; Teotepeque, El Salvador
- Died: 1 February 1932 (aged 38); San Salvador, El Salvador
- Cause of death: Execution by firing squad
- Occupations: Revolutionary, activist
- Political party: Communist Party of El Salvador

Signature
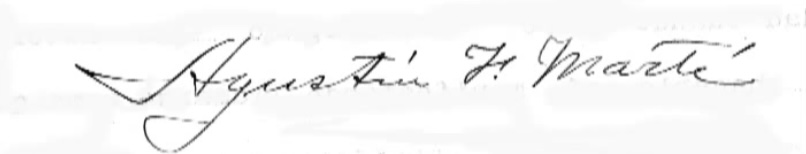

Agustín Farabundo Martí Rodríguez (Spanish pronunciation: [faɾaˈβundo maɾˈti]; 5 May 1893 – 1 February 1932) was a Salvadoran activist and communist revolutionary during La Matanza.

== Early life ==
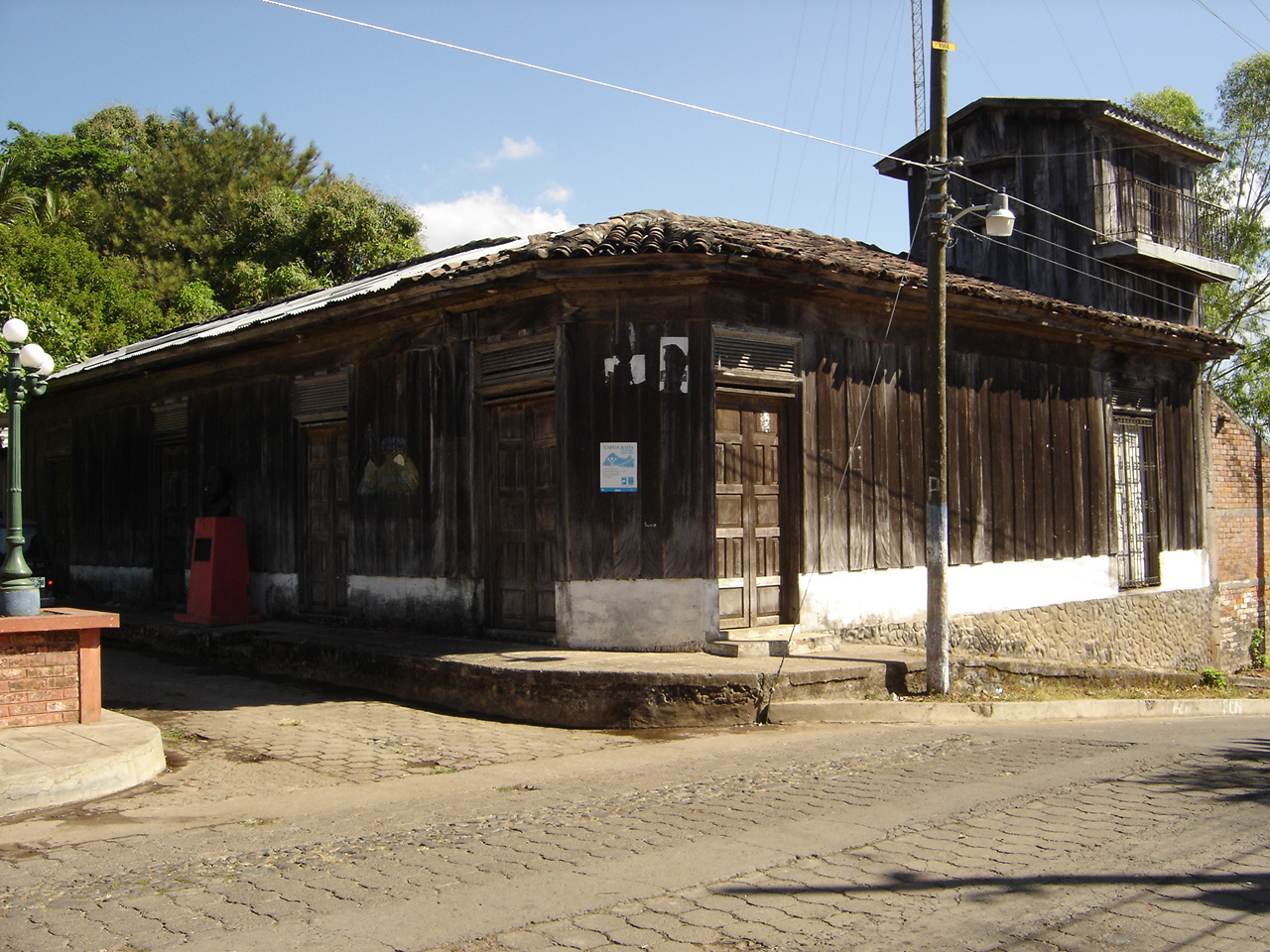
House where Agustín Farabundo Martí, was born in Teotepeque, El Salvador

Farabundo Martí was born on 5 May 1893 in Teotepeque, El Salvador to Pedro Martí and Socorro Rodríguez. Martí was the sixth of fourteen children. His birth certificate identified him as "Faramundo Agustín Martí". Martí's father changed his surname from "Martír" out of admiration for Cuban nationalist José Martí. Martí was baptized on 11 February 1894.

From a very young age, Martí struggled to make sense of the glaring inequalities he witnessed around him. It did not make sense to him why there was such a stark difference between his own shoes and the bare feet of the children from worker families he played with, as well as the contrast between the clean, decent clothes worn by his parents and the tattered, dirty rags on peasant workers. According to Jorge Arias Gómez's biography of Martí, when Martí became a teenager, he frequently pointed out to his parents the clear difference between the plentiful food that his family had compared to the very little food available to workers. Martí would repeatedly make his parents aware of the unfair situation, not understanding why there was such a large gap in the amount and quality of food between his relatively wealthy family and the peasant workers around him.

After graduating from Saint Cecilia Salesian School in Santa Tecla, he enrolled at the University of El Salvador, in San Salvador. From early on, he condemned the exploitation of the country's poor for the profit of the rich. He became known as a Salvadoran revolutionary and for many, a martyr.

== Revolutionary activity ==
Farabundo Martí was categorized by Miguel Mármol as an intellectual but a proletarian-like young man in his testimonio. Martí decided to drop out of his Political Science and Jurisprudence program at the University of El Salvador in order to fight for his community and nation. In 1920, Martí, along with numerous students, were arrested for taking part in a protest against the then-ruling Meléndez-Quiñónez dynasty. Martí's arrest subsequently led to his exile from the country, taking up residence in Guatemala and later Mexico until his return to El Salvador in 1925.

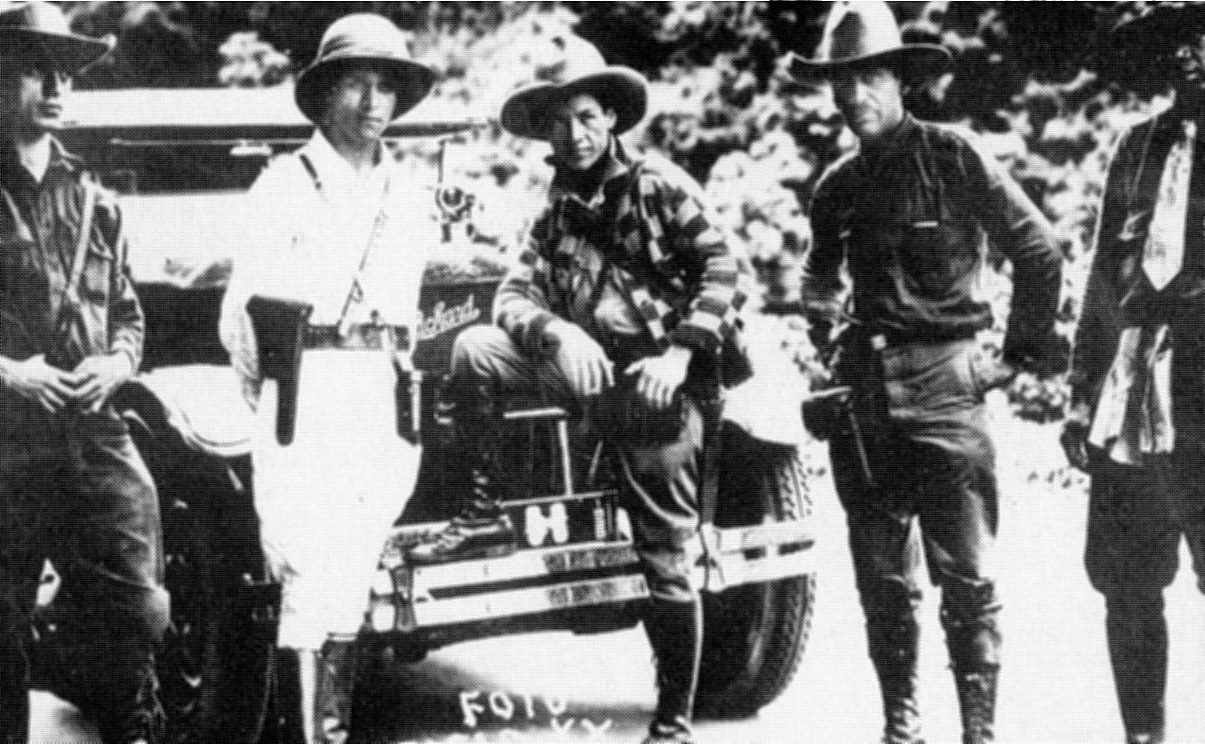
Augusto Sandino (centre) Farabundo Martí, (next to the right).

Upon his return from exile, Martí was appointed as a representative and invited to the conference of the Anti-Imperialist League of the Americas in New York City, where he met relatives of Nicaraguan revolutionary leader Augusto César Sandino. Upon arriving in New York, he was once again arrested and later released. In the meantime, he worked with the Nicaraguan revolutionary leader Augusto César Sandino. The two revolutionaries only worked together for a limited time, as they had differences in their approaches to change.

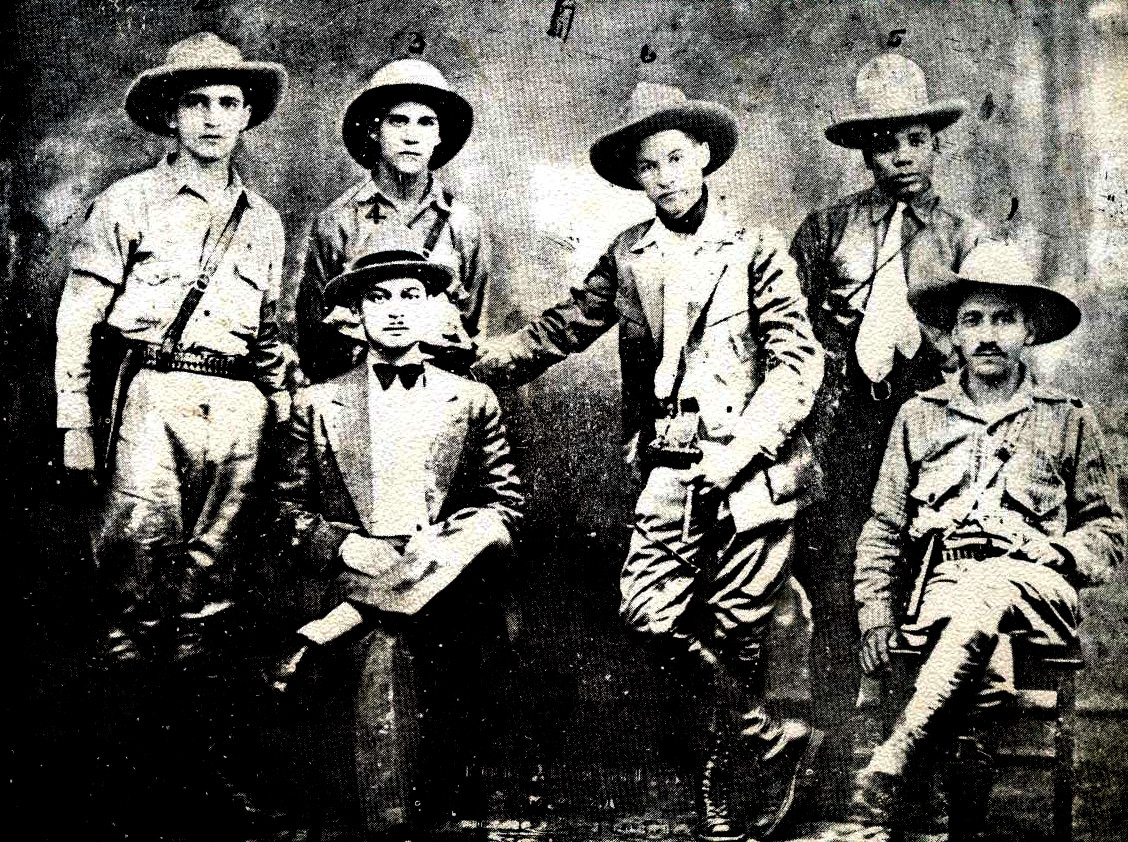
Martí and Sandino in Mexico.

Martí became involved in the founding of the Communist Party of Central America, where he led a communist alternative to the Red Cross, the International Red Aid, serving as one of its representatives. Its goal was to help poor and underprivileged Salvadorans by the use of the Marxist-Leninist ideology. In December 1930, at the height of the country's economic and social depression, Martí was once again exiled due to his rising popularity among the nation's peasants and working-class. In addition, there were also rumors of his upcoming nomination for President the following year.

== Uprising and death ==
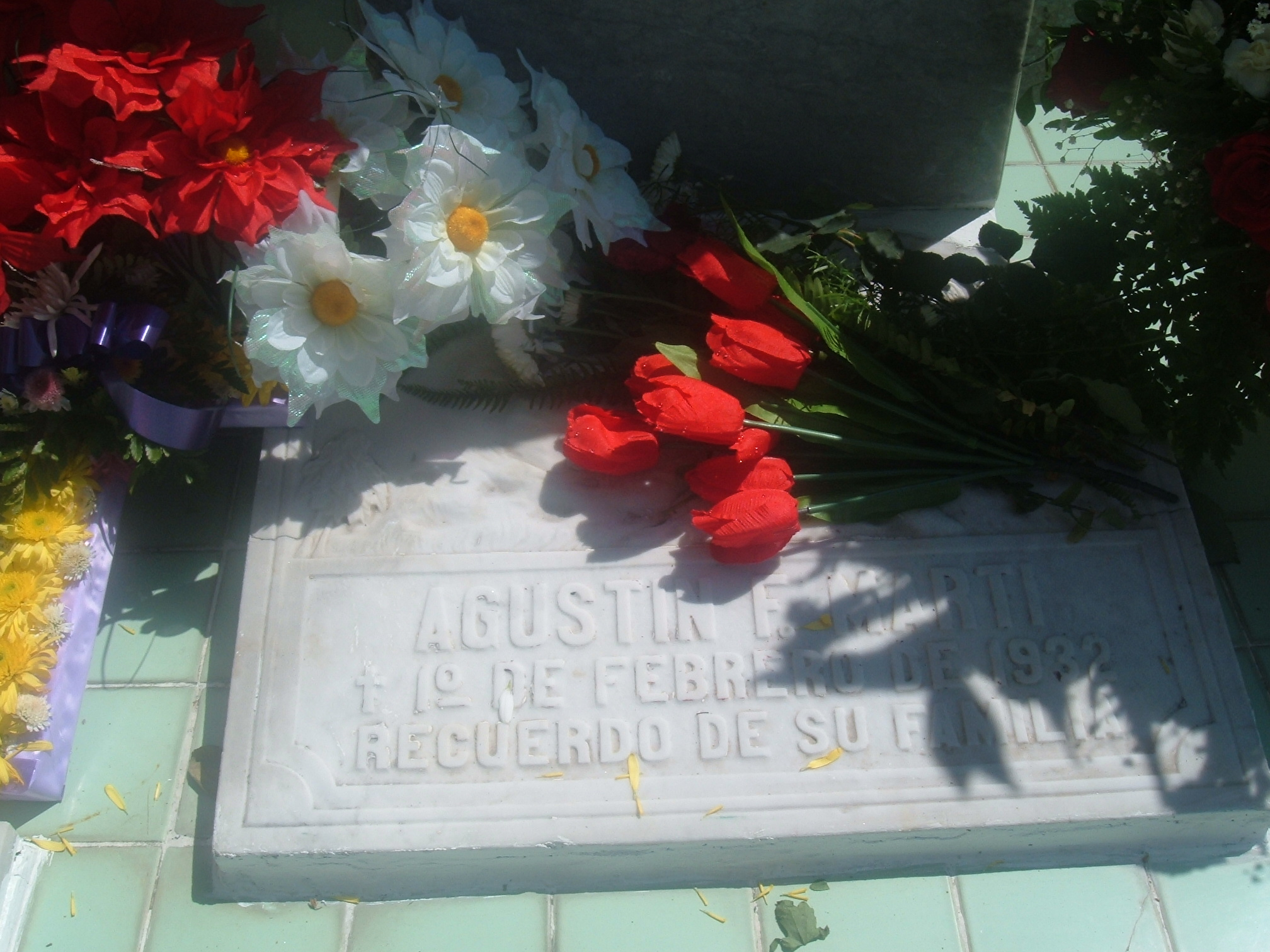
Farabundo Martí's tombstone in Cementerio de los Ilustres, San Salvador, El Salvador.

Once the new president Arturo Araujo was elected in March 1931, Martí returned to El Salvador and, along with Alfonso Luna and Mario Zapata, began the movement that was later truncated by the military. They helped start a guerrilla revolt of indigenous farmers. During that time, he was acting as the Interim General Secretary of the Party.

The communist-led peasant uprising against the dictator Maximiliano Hernández Martínez was fomented by collapsing coffee prices, relishing in the initial success but was soon drowned in a bloodbath, being crushed by the Salvadoran military ten days after the uprising had commenced. An estimated 30,000 Salvadoran civilians were killed as a result of the uprising by order of General Martínez which called for the killing of not only suspected participants of the uprising, but of those who were thought to have "not protested" against it. This event became known to as"La Matanza" ("The Slaughter").

President Hernández Martínez, who had himself toppled an elected government only weeks earlier, ordered Martí shot after a court-martial.

== See also ==
- History of El Salvador
- Politics of El Salvador
- Santa Ana, El Salvador
