= 1929 in El Salvador =

- Decades: 1900s; 1910s; 1920s; 1930s; 1940s
- See also: Other events of 1929; Timeline of Salvadoran history

The following lists events that happened in 1929 in El Salvador.

== Incumbents ==
- President: Pío Romero Bosque
- Vice President: Gustavo Vides
