= 1919 in El Salvador =

- Decades: 1890s; 1900s; 1910s; 1920s; 1930s
- See also: Other events of 1919; Timeline of Salvadoran history

The following lists events that happened in 1919 in El Salvador.

== Incumbents ==
- President: Alfonso Quiñónez Molina (until March 1), Jorge Meléndez (starting March 1)
- Vice President: Vacant (until March 1), Alfonso Quiñónez Molina (starting March 1)

== Events ==
=== January ===
- 12–14 January – Voters in El Salvador elected National Democratic Party candidate Jorge Meléndez to be President of El Salvador with 185,492 votes and a margin of 100%. He ran unopposed.

=== March ===
- 1 March – Jorge Meléndez was sworn in as President of El Salvador. Alfonso Quiñónez Molina was sworn in as Vice President.

== Deaths ==
- 16 June – Fernando Figueroa, politician (b. 1849)
- 8 October – Carlos Meléndez Ramírez (b. 1861)
