= 1923 in El Salvador =

- Decades: 1900s; 1910s; 1920s; 1930s; 1940s
- See also: Other events of 1923; Timeline of Salvadoran history

The following lists events that happened in 1923 in El Salvador.

== Incumbents ==
- President: Jorge Meléndez (until 1 March), Alfonso Quiñónez Molina (starting 1 March)
- Vice President: Alfonso Quiñónez Molina (until 1 March), Pío Romero Bosque (starting 1 March)

== Events ==
=== January ===
- 14 January — Voters in El Salvador elected National Democratic Party candidate Alfonso Quiñónez Molina to be President of El Salvador with a 100% margin but no results were posted. He was the only candidate.

=== February ===
- 7 February — El Salvador signed the 1923 Central American Treaty of Peace and Amity.

=== March ===
- 1 March — Alfonso Quiñónez Molina was sworn in as President of El Salvador. Pío Romero Bosque was sworn in as vice president.

=== September ===
- 17 September — C.D. Luis Ángel Firpo, a Salvadoran soccer team, was established.

== Deaths ==
- 3 September — Pedro José Escalón, politician (b. 1847)
