= 1932 in El Salvador =

- Decades: 1910s; 1920s; 1930s; 1940s; 1950s
- See also: Other events of 1932; Timeline of Salvadoran history

The following lists events that happened in 1932 in El Salvador.

== Incumbents ==
- President: Maximiliano Hernández Martínez
- Vice President: Vacant

== Events ==
=== January ===
- 3–5 January – The 1932 Salvadoran legislative election was held but the results were cancelled by Maximiliano Hernández Martínez due to the Communist Party of El Salvador winning several municipalities.
- 10–12 January – Further elections scheduled for January 10 through 12 were cancelled.
- 22 January – Peasants led by Farabundo Martí, Mario Zapata, and Alfonso Luna rise up in western El Salvador against the government of Maximiliano Hernández Martínez, initially killing at least 50 people.

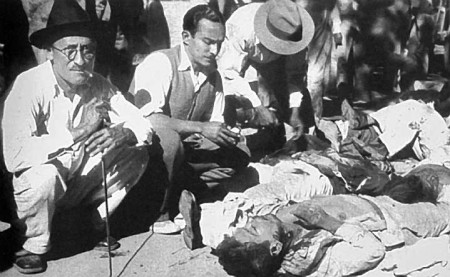
Dead bodies of the killing of the Salvadoran Army in 1932.

- 28 January – Feliciano Ama was hanged by the Armed Forces in Izalco for his role in the uprising.

=== February ===
- 1 February – Farabundo Martí was executed by a firing squad by the Armed Forces in Izalco for his role in the uprising.

=== July ===
- 11 July – The Legislative Assembly of El Salvador issued Legislative Decree No. 121 on July 11, 1932, which granted unconditional amnesty to anyone who committed crimes of any nature in order to "restore order, repress, persecute, punish and capture those accused of the crime of rebellion of this year." La Matanza officially ended with 25,000 to 40,000 dead.

=== December ===
- 26 December – El Salvador denounced the 1923 Central American Treaty of Peace and Amity.

== Deaths ==
- 28 January – Feliciano Ama, activist and revolutionary (b. 1881)
- 28 January – Francisco "Chico" Sanchez, activist and revolutionary (b. ?)
- 1 February – Farabundo Martí, activist and revolutionary (b. 1893)
