= 1930 in El Salvador =

- Decades: 1910s; 1920s; 1930s; 1940s; 1950s
- See also: Other events of 1930; Timeline of Salvadoran history

The following lists events that happened in 1930 in El Salvador.

== Incumbents ==
- President: Pío Romero Bosque
- Vice President: Gustavo Vides

== Events ==
=== Undated ===
- C.D. Titán, a Salvadoran football club, was established.
