= Teotepeque =

- District
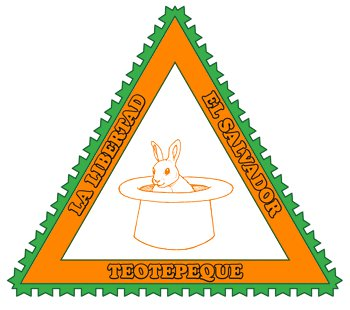
- Seal

- Location in El Salvador
- Coordinates: 13°35′7″N 89°31′6″W
- Country: El Salvador
- Department: La Libertad
- Elevation: 1,644 ft (501 m)

Population (2024)
  - District: 9,862
  - Rank: 136th in El Salvador
  - Rural: 9,862

Teotepeque is a municipality in the La Libertad department of El Salvador. Its geographical coordinates are 13° 35' 7" North, 89° 31' 6" West. The name Teotepeque comes from the Nahuat word for "Mountain of God." Agustín Farabundo Martí Rodríguez, for whom the FMLN or Farabundo Marti National Liberation Front was named, was born in Teotepeque on May 5, 1893.
