= 1914 in El Salvador =

- Decades: 1890s; 1900s; 1910s; 1920s; 1930s
- See also: Other events of 1914; Timeline of Salvadoran history

The following lists events that happened in 1914 in El Salvador.

== Incumbents ==
- President: Carlos Meléndez Ramírez (until 29 August), Alfonso Quiñónez Molina (starting 29 August)
- Vice President: Vacant

== Events ==
=== August ===
- 29 August – Carlos Meléndez Ramírez resigned as Provisional President and Alfonso Quiñónez Molina succeeded him as Provisional President.

=== Undated ===
- Chinameca S.C., a Salvadoran football club, was established.
