= 1917 in El Salvador =

- Decades: 1890s; 1900s; 1910s; 1920s; 1930s
- See also: Other events of 1917; Timeline of Salvadoran history

The following lists events that happened in 1917 in El Salvador.

== Incumbents ==
- President: Carlos Meléndez Ramírez
- Vice President: Alfonso Quiñónez Molina

== Events ==
=== Undated ===
- C.D. Santiagueño, a Salvadoran football club, was established.

== Births ==
- 7 July – Fidel Sánchez Hernández, politician (d. 2003)
- 15 August – Óscar Romero, Catholic archbishop (d. 1980)
