= 1984 in El Salvador =

- Decades: 1960s; 1970s; 1980s; 1990s; 2000s
- See also: Other events of 1984; Timeline of Salvadoran history

Events in the year 1984 in 1984 in El Salvador.

== Incumbents ==
- President: José Napoleón Duarte

== Events ==
=== March ===
- March 25: The 1984 Salvadoran presidential election was held.

=== July ===
- July 28: El Salvador participates at the 1984 Summer Olympics.

=== Deaths ===
- March 16 – John Hoagland, 36, photojournalist, shot.
- October 23 – Napoleón Herson Calitto, 42, commanding officer, helicopter crash.
