= 1985 in El Salvador =

- Decades: 1960s; 1970s; 1980s; 1990s; 2000s
- See also: Other events of 1985; Timeline of Salvadoran history

Events from the year 1985 in El Salvador.

== Incumbents ==
- President: José Napoleón Duarte

== Events ==
- 31 March – Salvadoran legislative election, 1985
- 19 June – 1985 Zona Rosa attacks
- July – the United States offered a reward of US$100,000 for information leading to the conviction of those involved in the Zona Rosa attacks as part of the Combat Terrorism Act.
- September – the Salvadoran government arrests four men, including Américo Mauro Araujo, a high-ranking Salvadoran Communist Party official, for their involvement in the Zona Rosa attacks.
