= C.D. Once Berlinés =

Once Berlinés
- Full name: Club Deportivo Once Berlinés
- Nicknames: 11 Berlinés, Berlín F.C. de Usulutan, Los Canarios
- Founded: 21 February 1921; 104 years ago
- Ground: Estadio Dr. Raúl Clemente Baires, Berlín
- Capacity: 300
- Manager: Óscar González
- League: ADFA Usulutan
Home colours

Club Deportivo Once Berlinés is a Salvadoran professional football club located in Berlín, in the department of Usulután Department, El Salvador.

== History ==
The club was founded on 21 February 1921 by Raúl Clemente Baires, Mauricio Botter, and Mauricio Balcaceres under the name Equipo Canario. The club has had notable achievements, including being the first team to defeat the inaugural El Salvadoran Champion, Chinameca S.C., with a score of 2-0 in 1928.

== Personnel ==
=== Management ===
Position	Staff
Owner	(El Salvador)
President	(El Salvador) Castillo
Vice President	(El Salvador)
TBD	(El Salvador)
TBD	(El Salvador)
TBD	(El Salvador)
TBD	(El Salvador)

=== Coaching staff ===
Position	Staff
Manager	(El Salvador) TBD
Assistant Managers	(El Salvador) TBD
Reserve Manager	(El Salvador) TBD
Under 17 Manager	(El Salvador) TBD
Goalkeeper Coach	(El Salvador) TBD
Fitness Coach	(El Salvador) TBD
Team Doctor	(El Salvador)

== Notable players ==
- Óscar Benítez
- Jaime Portillo (1970 world cup player)

== List of coaches ==
- (El Salvador) Eliazar Campos (1960)
- (El Salvador) Ricardo Caron Campos (1977)
- (El Salvador) Víctor Antonio Díaz (2018)
