= Esteban Servellón =

Salvadoran composer (1921–2003)

- Born: Esteban Servellón Torres; 16 October 1921; San Esteban Catarina, El Salvador
- Died: 12 August 2003 (aged 81); San Salvador, El Salvador
- Occupations: Musician, composer, pedagogue

Esteban Servellón Torres (16 October 1921 – 12 August 2003) was a Salvadoran musician, composer, and pedagogue. He composed, among other works, a Requiem Mass, a sonata for guitar, and several serenades and quartets.

== Early life and career ==
The son of Pedro Servellón and Lucía Torres, from a young age he played the viola, cello and violin. At age 16, he moved with his mother and siblings to Ciudad Delgado, near the capital of San Salvador. He studied at the Rafael Olmedo National School of Music in that city, and in 1941, joined the Banda de los Supremos Poderes, the State Symphony Orchestra.

== Later life and career ==
In 1952, Servellón received a government scholarship to study composition and conducting at the Accademia Nazionale di Santa Cecilia in Rome, where he remained for four years. In the same year, he created the ballet Rina. In 1956, he returned to El Salvador where he assumed the position of director of the National Conservatory of Music. By 1960, he was the Assistant Director of the Salvadoran Army Symphony Orchestra (Orquesta Sinfónica del Ejército de El Salvador). Renamed the El Salvador Symphony Orchestra (Orquesta Sinfónica de El Salvador; OSES) in 1960, Servellón went on to become its conductor.

In 1973, he traveled to the United States where he lived for three years. In 1976, he moved to Veracruz, Mexico, where he remained until 1992. In the 1980s, he was professor of musical composition at the Universidad Veracruzana. On his return to El Salvador, he briefly worked as head of the School of Music of the National Arts Centre. His works included Suite de Cuerdas, Suite Retrospectivas, Sonatina para Pequeña Orquesta, Cuarteto de Cuerdas Tres Alotrópicos, Introducción y Rondó para Contrabajo y Cuerdas, and Concertino para contrabajo y orquesta. He also created the symphonic poems Sihuehuet, Faetón, and Zipitín. Servellón died of sudden cardiac arrest in 2003.

== Bibliography ==
- Apel, Willi (1969). Harvard Dictionary of Music. Harvard University Press. p. 287. ISBN 978-0-674-37501-7.
