= El Salvador Symphony Orchestra =

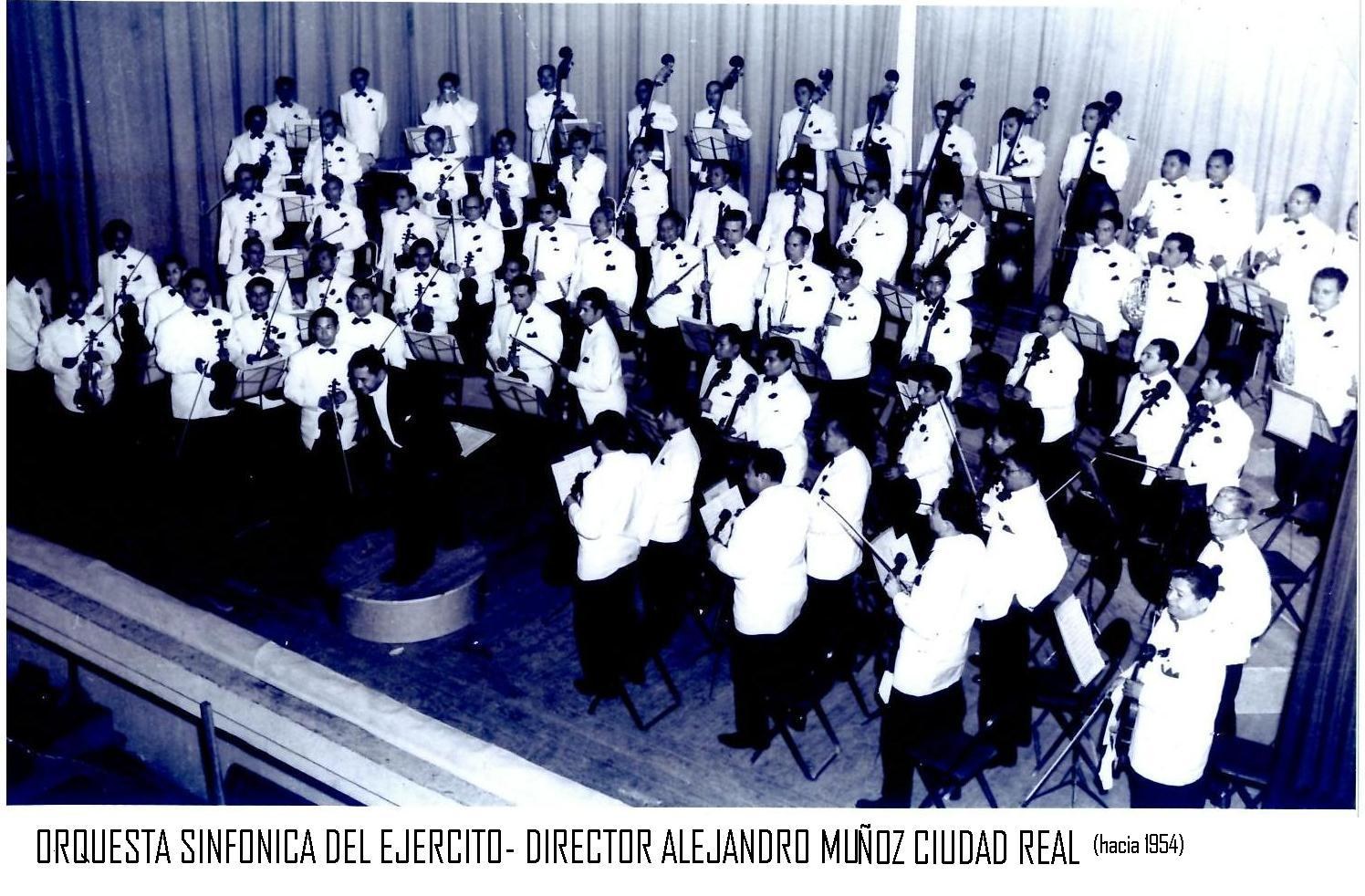
Director Alejandro Muñoz Ciudad Real bows to the audience in front of the El Salvador Symphony Orchestra of the Army in 1954.

El Salvador Symphony Orchestra (Orquesta Sinfónica de El Salvador; OSES) is the national symphony orchestra of El Salvador. Founded in 1922, by Paul Müller, it is one of Central America's oldest orchestras. Originally formed as the Banda de los Supremos Poderes (Supreme Powers Band), it was renamed the Orquesta Sinfónica del Ejército (Army Symphony Orchestra), before taking its current name. Esteban Servellón and Humberto Pacas have served as its conductors. The OSES was preceded by two earlier classical music groups, the Philharmonic Society of El Salvador (1875) and the National Orchestral Society (1910). OSES is funded by government and private sources.

== Bibliography ==
- Apel, Willi (1969). Harvard Dictionary of Music. Harvard University Press. p. 287. ISBN 978-0-674-37501-7.
- DiPiazza, Francesca Davis (1 January 2007). El Salvador in Pictures. Twenty-First Century Books. ISBN 978-0-8225-7145-2.
- Penland, Paige R. (4 October 2010). Explorer's Guide El Salvador: A Great Destination. Countryman Press. ISBN 978-1-58157-114-1.
