= Gustavo Vides =

Salvadoran politician

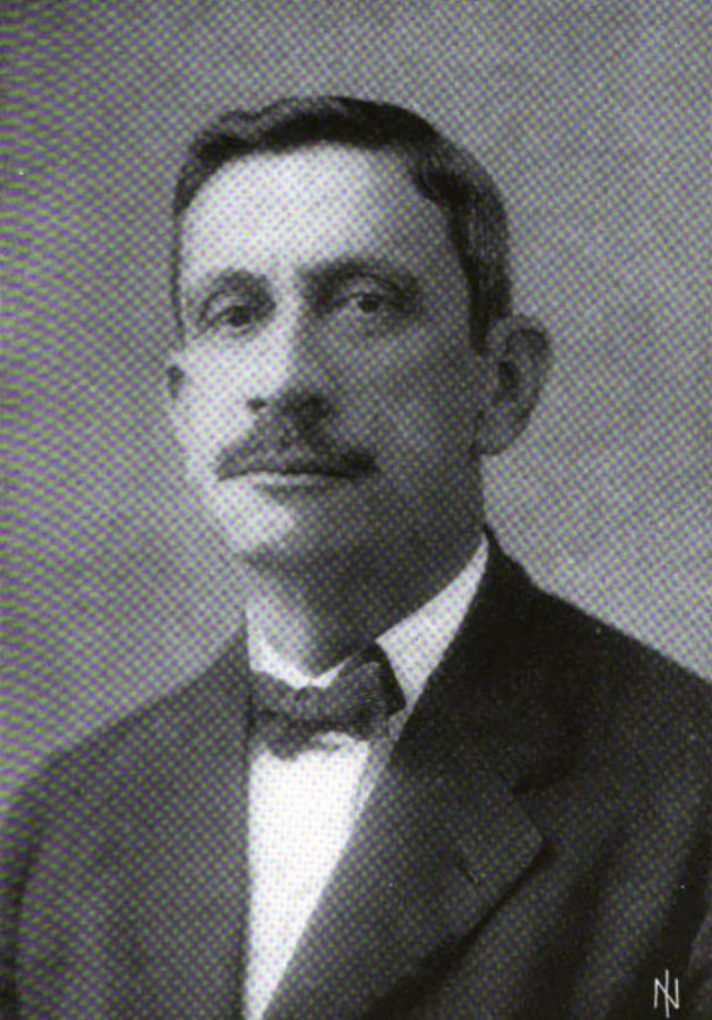
- Vides in c. 1923–1925

Vice President of El Salvador
- In office 1 March 1927 – 1 March 1931
- President: Pío Romero Bosque
- Preceded by: Pío Romero Bosque
- Succeeded by: Maximiliano Hernández Martínez

Minister of Finance
- In office 1 March 1923 – 1 March 1927
- President: Alfonso Quiñónez Molina
- Preceded by: Calixto Velado

Personal details
- Born: Santa Ana, El Salvador
- Party: National Democratic Party

Gustavo Vides was a politician from El Salvador who was Vice President of El Salvador during the presidency of Pío Romero Bosque.

He was born about year 1880. He was born in Santa Ana to an old aristocratic family. He studied engineering in the United States. Vides was minister of finance in the cabinet of Alfonso Quiñónez Molina from 1923 to 1927. In December 1926 he got the nomination from the National Democratic Party for vice presidency in the elections of 1927 as the running mate of Pío Romero Bosque, who won the election.

Vides was Vice President of El Salvador from 1 March 1927 to 1 March 1931.

He was considered a wealthy man who was not seen in the social circles of the capital.
