= Alfonso Quiñónez Molina =

President of El Salvador (1923–1927)

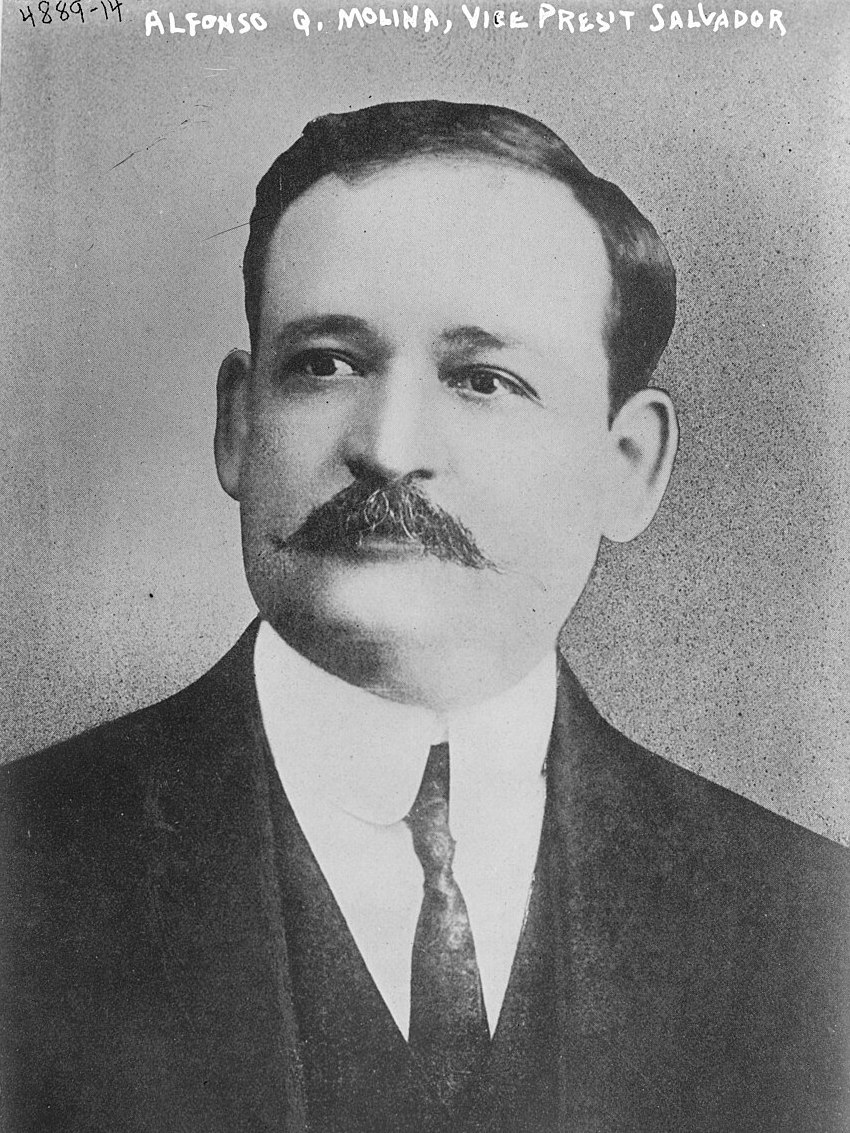
- Quiñónez in 1915

President of El Salvador
- In office 1 March 1923 – 1 March 1927
- Vice President: Pío Romero Bosque
- Preceded by: Jorge Meléndez
- Succeeded by: Pío Romero Bosque
- In office 21 December 1918 – 1 March 1919; Provisional President
- Preceded by: Carlos Meléndez
- Succeeded by: Jorge Meléndez
- In office 29 August 1914 – 1 March 1915; Provisional President
- Preceded by: Carlos Meléndez (provisional)
- Succeeded by: Carlos Meléndez
Other offices
Vice President of El Salvador
In office 1 March 1919 – 1 March 1923
President	Jorge Meléndez
Preceded by	Himself
Succeeded by	Pío Romero Bosque
In office 1 March 1915 – 21 December 1918
President	Carlos Meléndez
Preceded by	Onofre Durán
Succeeded by	Himself
Minister of War, the Navy, and Finance of El Salvador
In office 8 July 1913 – 29 August 1914
President	Carlos Meléndez (provisional)
Preceded by	Francisco Martínez Suárez
Succeeded by	Pío Romero Bosque
Minister of Government of El Salvador
In office ? – 29 August 1914
Preceded by	Teodosio Carranza
Succeeded by	Cecilio Bustamante
Mayor of San Salvador
In office 1912
Preceded by	Manuel Esquivel
Succeeded by	Santiago Letona Hernández
Alternate Deputy of the Legislative Assembly of El Salvador from San Salvador
In office 5 February 1912 – 1912

Personal details
- Born: 11 January 1874 Suchitoto, El Salvador
- Died: 22 May 1950 (aged 76) San Salvador, El Salvador
- Party: Liberal (until 1918); National Democratic Party (1918–1927)
- Spouse: Leonor Meléndez (m. 1905)
- Children: 1
- Relatives: Carlos and Jorge Meléndez; Pío Romero Bosque; (all brothers-in-law); Miguel Tomás Molina (cousin)
- Education: University of El Salvador
- Occupation: Politician, physician

Alfonso Quiñónez Molina (Note: Spanish pronunciation: [alˈfonso kiˈɲones moˈlina]) (11 January 1874 – 22 May 1950) was a Salvadoran politician and physician who served as the 24th President of El Salvador from 1923 to 1927. He also served as the country's acting president on two separate occasions (1914–1915 and 1918–1919) and twice served as Vice President of El Salvador under his brothers-in-law Carlos and Jorge Meléndez. The presidencies of Quiñónez and the Meléndez brothers from 1913 to 1927 are collectively known as the Meléndez–Quiñónez dynasty.

Quiñónez studied medicine and surgery at the University of El Salvador. He practiced medicine and served as an administrator of several Salvadoran hospitals from the late 1890s to early 1900s. He entered politics in 1899, becoming an alderman on the municipal council of San Salvador (El Salvador's capital city). He served as both mayor of San Salvador and an alternate member of the Legislative Assembly of El Salvador in 1912. He was El Salvador's interior minister and war minister from 1913 to 1914. Quiñónez became provisional president of El Salvador in August 1914 while Carlos Meléndez (the incumbent president) ran in the 1915 presidential election; Carlos Meléndez won and appointed Quiñónez as vice president.

Quiñónez ran for president during the 1919 presidential election and established the Red League, a paramilitary organization, to attack and intimidate his political opponents. In December 1918, Quiñónez became provisional president after Carlos Meléndez resigned due to poor health; Quiñónez's assumption of the presidency made him ineligible to contest the presidential election. Quiñónez appointed Jorge Meléndez to run instead. He won and appointed Quiñónez as his vice president. Quiñónez ran for president again in 1923; he won with the Red League's help and assumed office on 1 March.

Quiñónez was succeeded as president in 1927 by Vice President Pío Romero Bosque, another brother-in-law. Through Romero, Quiñónez intended to rule El Salvador from behind the scenes, but Romero instead broke with the Meléndez–Quiñónez dynasty. Quiñónez left El Salvador for exile in France due to student protests against him and the Legislative Assembly reviewing the constitutionality of his appointment as the first presidential designate. Quiñónez backed a coup d'état against Romero in December 1927 which was unsuccessful. Quiñónez returned to El Salvador in 1936 and he died in San Salvador in 1950.

== Early life ==
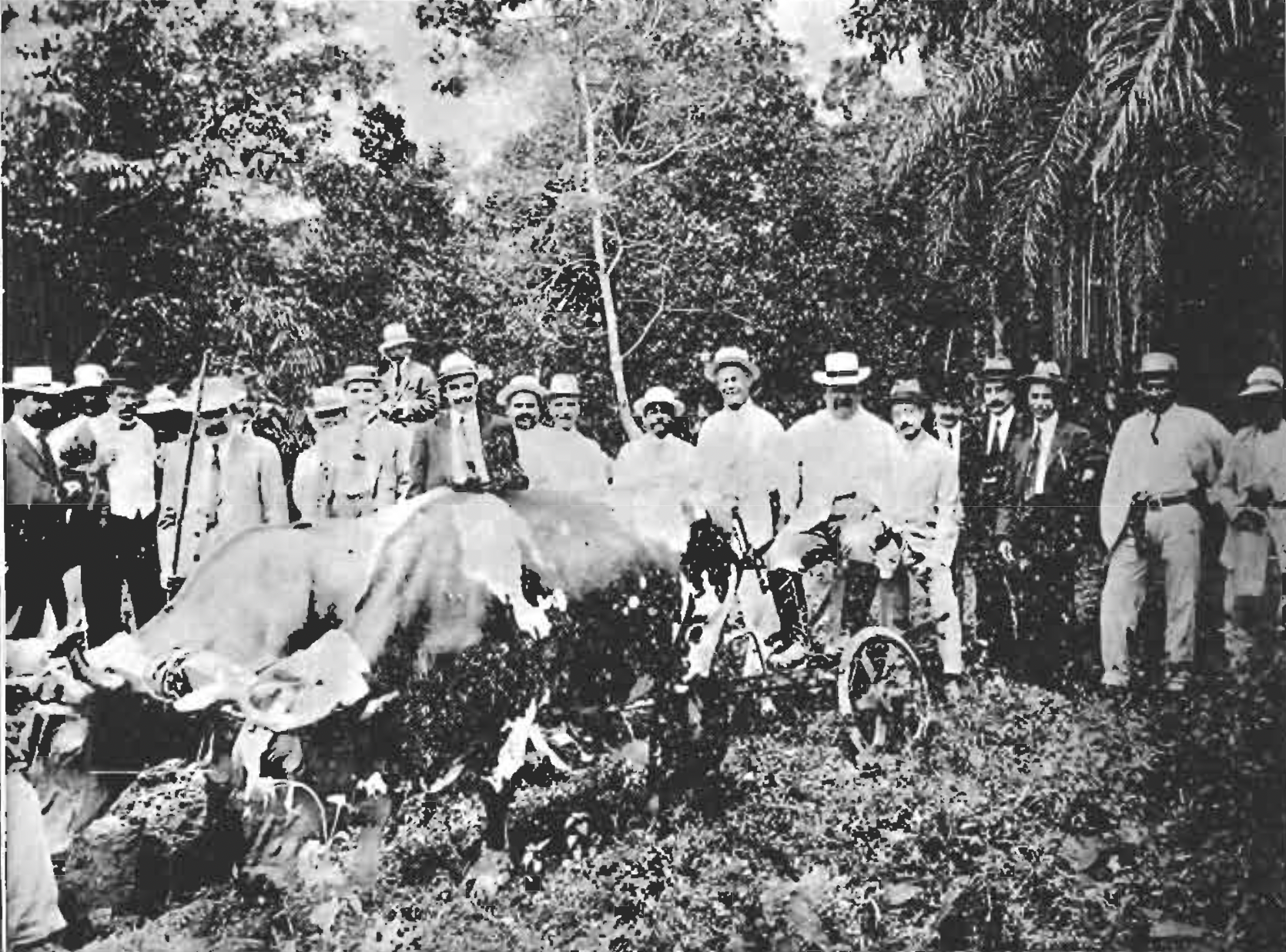
Quiñónez (center right) demonstrating agricultural implements at the Insane Asylum

Alfonso Quiñónez Molina was born on 11 January 1874 in Suchitoto, El Salvador. (Note: According to L.A. Ward, Quiñónez was born on 11 January 1873.) His parents were Lucio Quiñónez and Aurelia Molina de Quiñónez. Quiñónez studied medicine at the Liceo San Luis in Nueva San Salvador from which he graduated as a Bachelor of Arts and Science. He then studied at the University of El Salvador and completed his Doctorate of Medicine in surgery in 1898. Quiñónez practiced medicine at the General Hospital of San Salvador beginning in 1897, and the following year, he was became a member of the board of the country's insane asylum. He also served as the chair of the hygiene and therapeutics and a counselor of the medical faculty at the University of El Salvador. In 1904, Quiñónez became the director of the Insane Asylum. At some point, he became the head of the first surgery clinic at Hospital Rosales.

In 1905, Quiñónez married Leonor Meléndez. The couple had one daughter, Mercedes. Carlos and Jorge Meléndez were two of Quiñónez's brothers-in-law through his marriage to Leonor. In 1906, Quiñónez served as the acting physician for El Salvador's Red Cross society. Beginning in 1908, Quiñónez petitioned the government of Divisional General Fernando Figueroa, the president of El Salvador, to allocate funds to upgrade the Insane Asylum's buildings. In Figueroa's last presidential act in 1911, he approved a law allocating one cent from the revenue of each manufactured brandy bottle to fund these buildings. Quiñónez oversaw the construction of three new Insane Asylum buildings on 60 manzanas (Note: 60 manzanas is equivalent to 103.74 acres (41.98 ha); in El Salvador, 1 manzana measures 1.729 acres (0.700 ha).) of land in San Salvador.

Quiñónez represented El Salvador at the Pan-American Medical Congress in Guatemala City, Guatemala, in 1908 and at the Fourth International Sanitary Conference in San José, Costa Rica in 1909. In 1910, Quiñónez attended the Diplomatic Conference in The Hague, Netherlands; the Tropic Agriculturists Congress in Brussels, Belgium; the 3rd International Conference of Hygiene in Paris, France; and the International Congress on Tuberculosis in Barcelona, Spain.

== Early political career ==
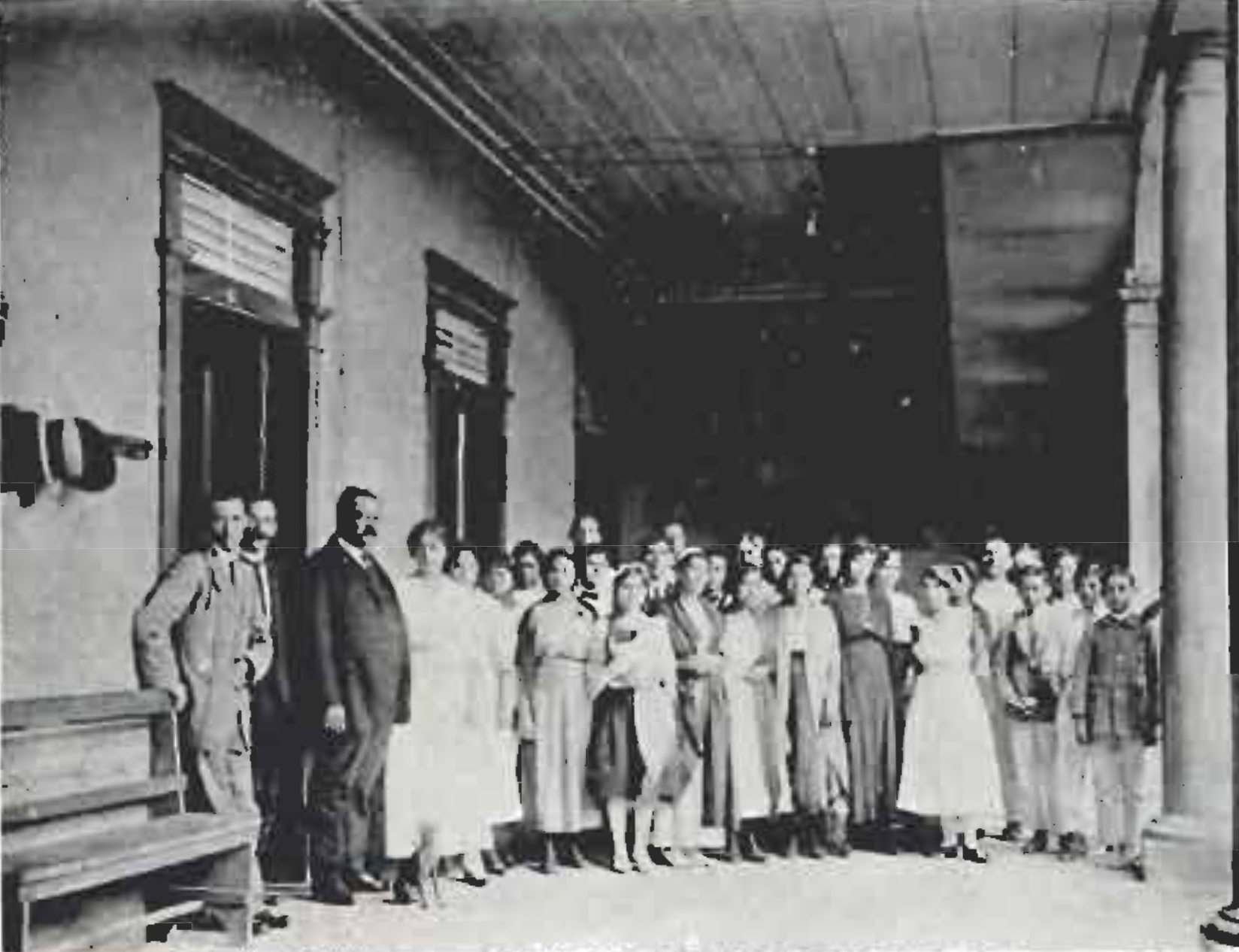
Quiñónez (left) with staff and students of the School of Graphic Arts

Quiñónez was a pragmatic liberal. In 1899, Quiñónez was elected as a regidor (alderman) of the San Salvador municipal council for a one-year term. He was again elected to the municipal council in 1904 for another one-year term. In 1912, Quiñónez was elected as an alternate deputy of the Legislative Assembly of El Salvador from the San Salvador Department; the legislative term began on 5 February and ended sometime later that year. Quiñónez was also the mayor of San Salvador in 1912. At some point between 1911 and 1913, President Manuel Enrique Araujo appointed Quiñónez as Minister of Government. As minister, Quiñónez established the School of Graphic Arts, the Home for Orphans, and the Tuberculosis Hospital.

On 9 February 1913, Araujo died to wounds sustained during an assassination attempt a few days prior. As Vice President Onofre Durán had resigned before Araujo's death, Carlos Meléndez (the president of the Legislative Assembly) became president of El Salvador as he was the first presidential designate. On 4 March 1914, the Legislative Assembly named Quiñónez as the first presidential designate. In 1913, Carlos Meléndez appointed Quiñónez as Minister of War, the Navy, and Finance.

== Presidencies and vice presidencies ==
=== First presidency and vice presidency ===
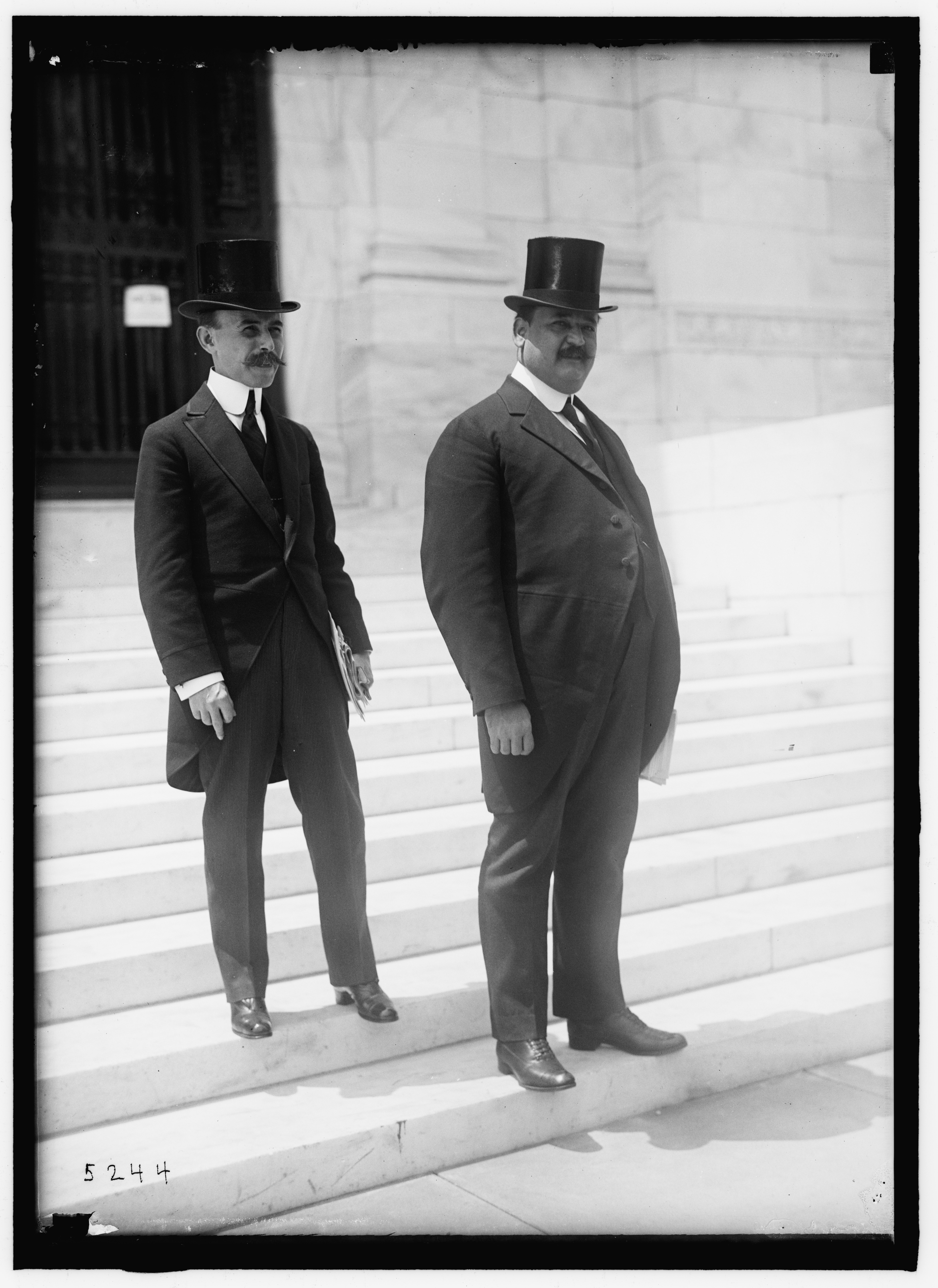
Quiñónez (right) and José Esperanza Suay (left) at the 1915 Pan-American Financial Conference in Washington, D.C., United States

On 29 August 1914, Carlos Meléndez resigned from the presidency to be eligible to run in the 1915 presidential election as the constitution prohibited anyone serving as president six months prior to an election from participating in an election. As Quiñónez was the first presidential designate, he succeeded Carlos Meléndez as provisional president. Quiñónez and Carlos Meléndez's sharing of power helped start the Meléndez–Quiñónez dynasty, a political dynasty that ruled El Salvador throughout much of the 1910s and 1920s.

Quiñónez appointed a cabinet consisting of Francisco Martínez Suárez as Minister of Exterior Relations, Public Instruction, and Justice; Cecilio Bustamante as Minister of Government, Promotion, and Agriculture; Samuel Luna as Minister of Finance, Public Credit, and Benefits; and Pío Romero Bosque (another brother-in-law) as Minister of War and the Navy. During Quiñónez's first provisional presidency, he established the Military Hospital and the National School of Finance and Commerce. Carlos Meléndez won the 1915 presidential election as a member of the Club Melendista pseudo-political party and appointed Quiñónez to serve as vice president.

Quiñónez handed the presidency to Carlos Meléndez on 1 March 1915, at which point he became vice president. In May 1915, Quiñónez represented El Salvador at the 1915 Pan-American Financial Conference in Washington, D.C., in the United States along with finance minister José Esperanza Suay. Quiñónez also attended the Panama–Pacific International Exposition in San Francisco.

Ahead of the 1919 presidential election, Carlos Meléndez went against precedent and did not select his successor. According to the memoirs of Enrique Córdova, then Minister of War and the Navy, Carlos Meléndez was unable to select a candidate between Quiñónez (a family member) and Tomás García Palomo (his government and finance minister and a close friend). In 1918, Quiñónez established the National Democratic Party (PND) to support his presidential campaign. He also established the Red League, a paramilitary organization that terrorized Palomo's campaign. Their supporters clashed during the December 1918 municipal elections as both candidates wanted to monopolize polling stations ahead of the presidential election the following month. The clashes killed around 100 people and injured more than 200. Quiñónez's allies won the municipal elections, effectively guaranteeing his victory in the presidential election.

=== Second presidency and vice presidency ===
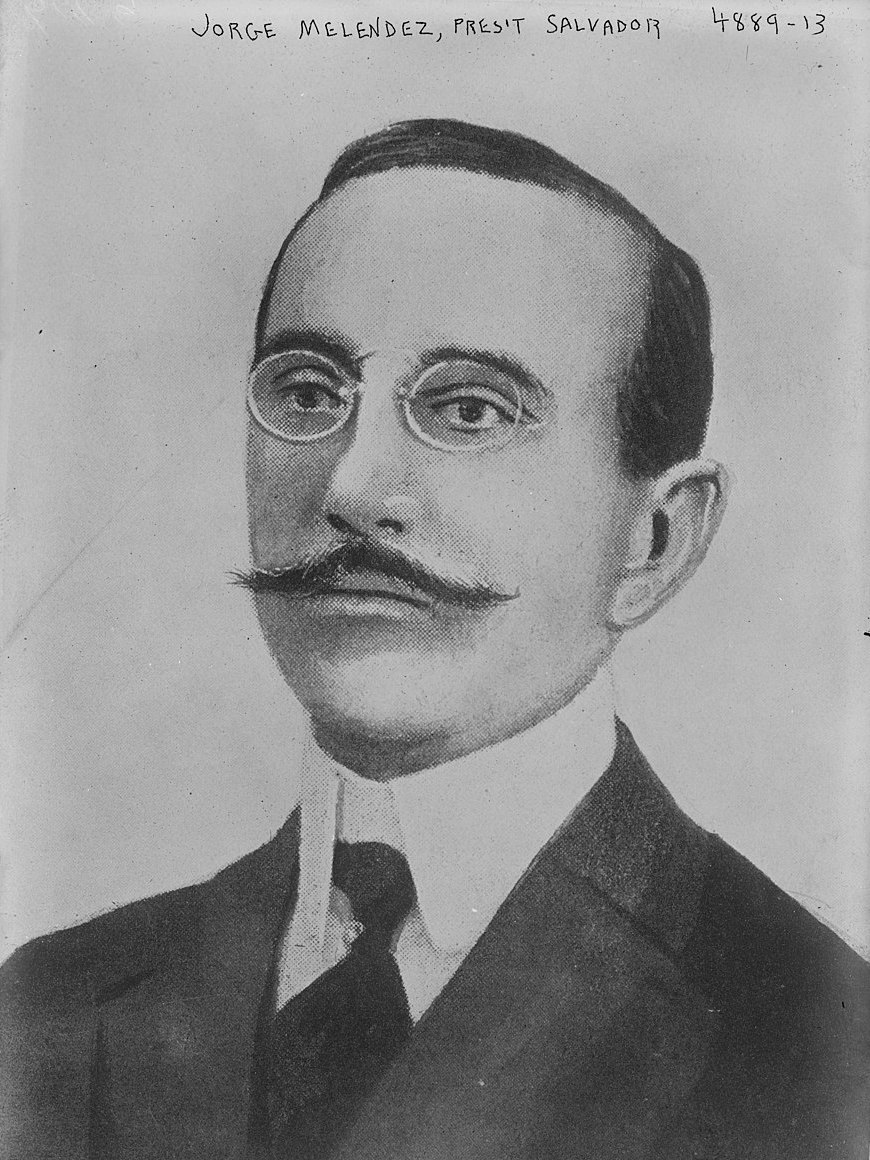
Jorge Meléndez, who Quiñónez selected to replace his campaign in the 1919 presidential election

On 21 December 1918, Carlos Meléndez resigned as president due to illness, (Note: Carlos Meléndez later died to this illness on 8 October 1919.) and Quiñónez assumed the presidency in a provisional capacity. Several of Carlos Meléndez's ministers also resigned, but he did not accept Bustamante's resignation as Minister of Government, Promotion, and Agriculture nor Córdova's resignation as Minister of War and the Navy. Palomo soon withdrew from the presidential election as he did not want to run against the incumbent president, but Quiñónez's ascension to the presidency, described by historian Erik Ching as a "mixed blessing", made him ineligible to run in the election for the same reason that Carlos Meléndez had resigned ahead of the 1915 election. Quiñónez offered to install Martínez as his successor, but Martínez declined. Quiñónez then contemplated running anyway and asked the United States legation if the US would recognize his presidency, but if and how the legation responded is unknown. Eventually, Quiñónez chose Jorge Meléndez—his brother-in-law and Carlos Meléndez's brother—to be the PND's presidential candidate less than one week before the election.

Arturo Araujo, a landowner from Sonsonate with whom Quiñónez was childhood friends, announced that he would challenge Jorge Meléndez. In response, Quiñónez ordered Romero (then the president of the Supreme Court of Justice) to also run in the election and instructed polling officials to tabulate the vast majority of votes in Jorge Meléndez's favor, then allocate votes to Romero, and leave the remaining votes to Araujo. This was intended to humiliate Araujo. Jorge Meléndez won the election. He assumed office on 1 March 1920, Quiñónez became vice president, and Romero was appointed as Minister of War and the Navy. Araujo attempted a coup against Jorge Meléndez in 1920, but it failed and he was exiled to Honduras. During Jorge Meléndez's term, he and Quiñónez consolidated their patronage networks within the PND to prevent factionalism.

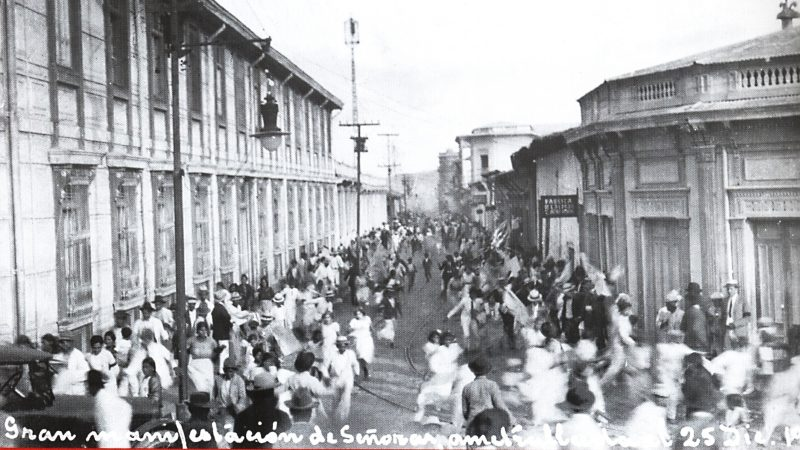
Miguel Tomás Molina's supporters fleeing the site of the Christmas Day Massacre

Quiñónez made another presidential run during the 1923 presidential election. This time, Miguel Tomás Molina—Jorge Meléndez's interior minister and Quiñónez's cousin—of the Constitutionalist Party was his chief opponent. Molina's reason for challenging Quiñónez is unknown, but historians believe that he may have wanted to implement democratic reforms. Jorge Meléndez and Quiñónez extended municipal term lengths from one to two years in 1921, meaning that there were no municipal elections in 1922. This left Molina unable to monopolize polling stations as increasing term lengths was done to prevent another opponent from attempting to monopolize polling stations as Quiñónez and Palomo did in 1918. In December 1922, Jorge Meléndez implemented a state of siege that prevented Molina from holding political rallies. He held a rally regardless on 25 December, but the Red League attacked the rally, killing "dozens" and injuring over 100 of Molina's supporters in the Christmas Day Massacre. Molina sought refuge in the Spanish embassy after the massacre, and Quiñónez went on to win the election unanimously with approximately 178,000 votes. Romero was elected as Quiñónez's vice president. US military intelligence later remarked in 1927 that Quiñónez "practically entered office over machine-gun fire".

=== Third presidency ===
Quiñónez was inaugurated on 1 March 1923. He appointed a cabinet consisting of Francisco Lima as Minister of Government, Promotion, and Agriculture; Reyes Arrieta Rossi as Minister of Exterior Relations, Public Instruction, and Justice; Calixto Velado as Minister of Finance, Public Credit, and Benefits; and Romero as Minister of War and the Navy. At some point, Quiñónez replaced Velado with Gustavo Vides to serve as Minister of Finance, Public Credit, and Benefits. Quiñónez dissolved the Red League after assuming office for unclear reasons, and by July 1923, US chargé d'affaires Montgomery Schuyler Jr. remarked that the paramilitary had "very largely dissolved".

On 20 March 1923, Quiñónez established the Salvadoran Air Fleet (now the Salvadoran Air Force), and in May, he founded the Public Instruction Treasury. At some point in 1923, Quiñónez allowed Araujo to return to El Salvador. He also further extended half of El Salvador's municipal term lengths from two to three years to further consolidate the PND's power. On 17 October 1924, Quiñónez was awarded the Grand Cross of the Civil Order of Alfonso XII by a royal decree issued by Spanish king Alfonso XIII. During the 1925 municipal elections, Quiñónez sent letters to local PND committees outlining which candidates he personally approved.

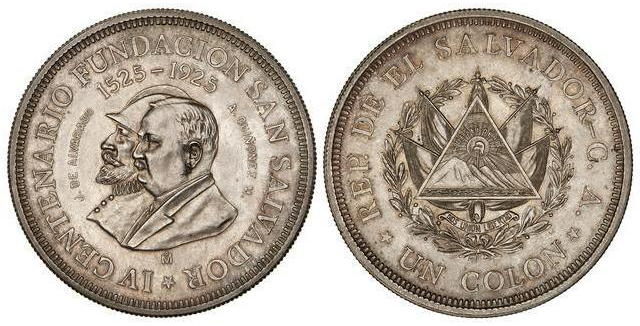
Quiñónez depicted on a 1 colón commemorative coin alongside Jorge de Alvarado

Throughout Quiñónez's third term, he invested in the construction of railways, highways, and the paving of San Salvador's streets. Quiñónez appeared on a 1925 commemorative coin celebrating the 400-year anniversary of the founding of San Salvador. Quiñónez was depicted alongside Jorge de Alvarado, the governor of Guatemala at the time of the city's founding. Quiñónez founded the National Radio of El Salvador on 1 March 1926. The radio's identification signal bore his initials "AQM". Quiñónez's government implemented various anti-Chinese laws including a restriction on return visas and a 100 colón head tax on Chinese immigrants. Trade unions and other labor organizations formed during Quiñónez's third presidency including the Regional Federation of Salvadoran Workers (FRTS). Ching wrote that Quiñónez's third presidential term was "rather uneventful".

Quiñónez wanted to secure another presidential term during the 1927 presidential election. He considered resigning six months before the election and began the process to draft a new constitution in mid-1926, but he eventually abandoned this effort due to the prospect's unpopularity among Salvadorans and a lack from US support for his re-election. (Note: Quiñónez was worried that the United States would not recognize his government in accordance with the 1923 Central American Treaty of Peace and Amity that called for its signatories to refuse recognition of governments that gained power through illegal means. Although amending the constitution was legal, Ching wrote that changing the constitution to allow re-election "evidently did not inspire confidence in the U.S. State Department for future political stability in El Salvador".) Quiñónez eventually chose Romero to succeed him to the presidency. Quiñónez intended Romero to be a puppet ruler and American diplomats Cornelius Van Hemert Engert and Jefferson Caffery believed that Quiñónez would continue to govern El Salvador behind the scenes. Romero unanimously won the 1927 election and succeeded Quiñónez as president of El Salvador on 1 March 1927.

== Post-presidency ==
=== Fall from power ===
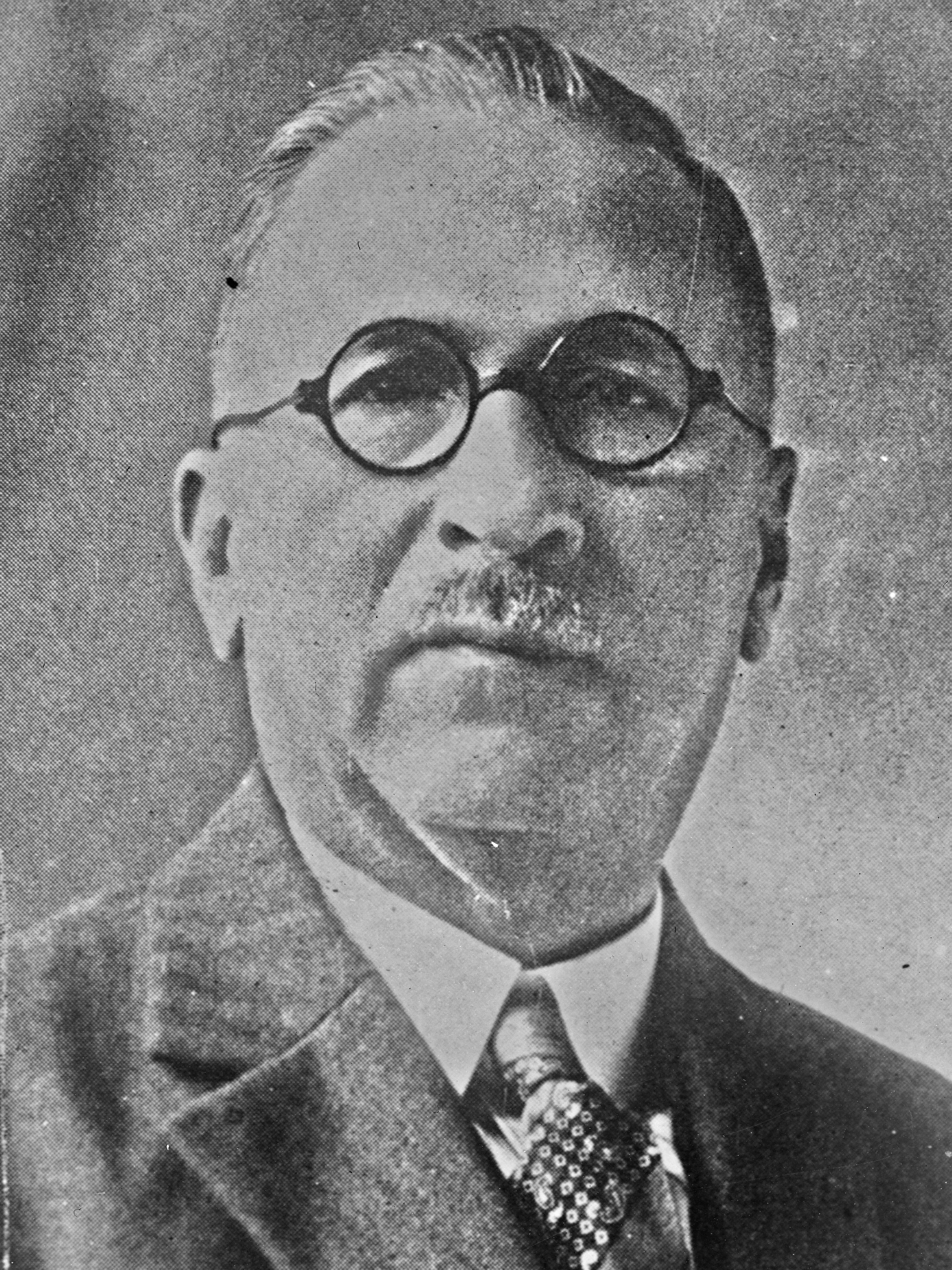
Pío Romero Bosque, who Quiñónez intended to be a puppet ruler but instead ended the Meléndez–Quiñónez dynasty

After Quiñónez left the presidency, the Legislative Assembly appointed him as the first presidential designate. He was second in line to the presidency after Vides, whom Quiñónez hand-picked to be vice president. Although Romero was supposed to be Quiñónez's puppet, the two soon fell out with each other. This began after Romero forced two of Quiñónez's political appointees, Undersecretary of Promotion Marcos A. Letona and Undersecretary of Public Instruction Salvador Rivas Vides, to resign, a move which Caffery credited with "part of [Romero's] campaign to do away with the Quiñónez influence".

Romero lifted Quiñónez's state of siege in April 1927, leading to a restoration of freedom of the press and the permitting of public demonstrations. Soon afterwards, University of El Salvador students held protests calling for Quiñónez's removal as the first presidential designate in front of his home. Romero sided with the protestors, describing Quiñónez's appointment as "unconstitutional". In June, the Legislative Assembly debated whether or not a former president could serve as the first presidential designate. A few days later, Quiñónez resigned and left El Salvador for exile in France with his family.

=== 1927 coup attempt ===
After Quiñónez left El Salvador, Romero announced his intention to implement democratic reforms for the December 1927 legislative and municipal elections. On 6 September, Romero disbanded the National Democratic Party and banned candidates from campaigning under the PND's name. Regardless, those loyal to the Quiñónez and the National Democratic Party engaged in political violence during the election cycle. In December, Quiñónez conspired with Jorge Meléndez, former police chief Federico Guillermo Kreitz, Colonel Juan Enrique Aberle, and Major Manuel Alfaro Noguera to stage a coup d'état against Romero's government. The coup failed and resulted in Aberle and Noguera's executions, Kreitz's arrest, and Jorge Meléndez fleeing El Salvador for exile in Costa Rica. The failed coup marks the end of the Meléndez–Quiñónez dynasty.

Schuyler interviewed Quiñónez in Paris in February 1928. During the interview, Quiñónez spoke of his relationship with Romero: "You know, of course, that we are no longer friends with Romero Bosque. We were old friends. He was in my government. I helped him greatly. But we have nothing to do with each other now." During the interview, he expressed sympathies for the December coup attempt (of which he did not acknowledge his involvement in) and condemned Aberle and Noguera's executions.

=== Later life and death ===
Quiñónez returned to El Salvador in 1936. Quiñónez died in his home on 22 May 1950 in San Salvador.

== Electoral history ==
The following table is a summary of Quiñónez's electoral history.

Year	Office	Type	Party	Main opponent	Party	Votes for Quiñónez				Result	Swing	Ref.
Year	Office	Type	Party	Main opponent	Party	Total	%	P.	±%	Result	Swing	Ref.
1919	President of El Salvador	General	National Democratic	Tomás García Palomo	Liberal	Withdrew					Gain	
1923	President of El Salvador	General	National Democratic	Miguel Tomás Molina	Constitutional	176,000	100.00	1st	N/A	Won	Hold	

== Works ==
Quiñónez published the following works:

- (1923) Recordatorio Patriótico: Obsequio del Señor Presidente de la República, Doctor Don Alfonso Quiñónez Molina a las Escuelas de El Salvador. 1o de Julio de 1823 – 1o de Julio de 1923 (Patriotic Reminder: Gift from the President of the Republic, Doctor Don Alfonso Quiñónez Molina to the Schools of El Salvador. 1 July 1823 – 1 July 1923), National Press of El Salvador, OCLC 18807150
- (1925) Libro del Campesino: Obra de Divulgación que Dedica y Obsequia a los Pobladores de los Campos Salvadoreños (The Peasant's Book: A Work of Popularization Dedicated and Presented to the Inhabitants of the Salvadoran Countryside), Ministry of Public Instruction, OCLC 55244671
- (1926) Documentos y Datos Históricos de la República de El Salvador (Historical Documents and Data of the Republic of El Salvador), National Press of El Salvador OCLC 55281929
- (1926) Estadistica General de la República del Salvador (General Statistics of the Republic of El Salvador), National Press of El Salvador OCLC 55281900

== See also ==
- List of heads of state and government who have been in exile

== Notes ==
Political offices
Preceded by Manuel Esquivel	Mayor of San Salvador; 1912	Succeeded by Santiago Letona Hernández
Preceded by Teodosio Carranza	Minister of Government of El Salvador ?–1914	Succeeded by Cecilio Bustamante
Preceded by Francisco Martínez Suárez	Minister of War, the Navy, and Finance of El Salvador; 1913–1914	Succeeded by Pío Romero Bosque
Preceded by Carlos Meléndez (provisional)	President of El Salvador (provisional); 1914–1915	Succeeded by Carlos Meléndez
Preceded by Onofre Durán	Vice President of El Salvador; 1915–1918	Succeeded by Himself
Preceded by Carlos Meléndez	President of El Salvador (provisional); 1918–1919	Succeeded by Jorge Meléndez
Preceded by Himself	Vice President of El Salvador; 1919–1923	Succeeded by Pío Romero Bosque
Preceded by Jorge Meléndez	President of El Salvador; 1923–1927	Succeeded by Pío Romero Bosque
