= List of massacres in Argentina =

The following is a list of massacres that have occurred in Argentina (numbers may be approximate):

| Name | Date | Location | Deaths | Notes |
|---|---|---|---|---|
| Selkʼnam genocide | 19th century | Tierra del Fuego | 2500-4000 | Systematic extermination of the Selkʼnam people in southern Argentina and Chile. |
| José Medana case | May, 1891 | Lomas de Zamora, Buenos Aires Province | 13 | A man named José Medana murders 10 of his children and 3 of his grandchildren. |
| Pirovano Massacre | February 5, 1905 | Pirovano, Buenos Aires Province | 18-20 | Confrontation between a military column from Bahía Blanca, which adhered to the Radical Revolution led by Hipólito Yrigoyen, and pro-government forces, led by President Manuel Quintana |
| Tragic Week | January 7, 1919 | Buenos Aires | 700 - 800 | General strikes by anarchists and communist strikers were brutally repressed by the police, army, and the Argentine Patriotic League, resulting in between 700 and 800 deaths, between 2,000 and 4,000 injuries, mostly workers, in addition to an anti-Jewish pogrom in the streets of Once and Villa Crespo. |
| La Forestal massacre | January 29, 1921 | Santa Fe province | ~600 | Mass killing, torture, rape and burning of houses of workers aligned with the anarcho-syndicalist union FORA by private police forces and the paramilitary nationalist organization Argentine Patriotic League |
| Patagonia rebelde | 1921 | Santa Cruz Province | 300-1500 | Uprising and violent suppression of a rural workers' strike by Colonel Héctor Benigno Varela's 10th Cavalry Regiment of the Argentine Army, Approximately 300-1,500 rural workers were shot and killed by the 10th Cavalry Regiment in the course of the operations, many of them executed by firing squads after surrendering |
| Azul murders | April 18, 1922 | Azul, Buenos Aires | 8 | Mateo Banks shot dead three siblings, two nieces, one sister-in-law and two family employees. |
| Napalpí massacre | July 19, 1924 | Napalpí, Chaco | 400 | Massacre of 400 indigenous people of the Toba ethnicity by the Argentine Police and ranchers. |
| Rincón Bomba massacre | October, 1947 | Las Lomitas, Formosa | 750-1,000 | Pilagá natives (including children, women and the elderly) who were trying to carry out a march, are machine-gunned by the National Gendarmerie |
| Bombing of Plaza de Mayo | June 16, 1955 | Plaza de Mayo | 364 | Failed coup by anti-Perón factions of the Argentine military |
| José León Suárez massacre | June 9, 1956 | José León Suárez, General San Martín Partido | 5 | Illegal execution of Perón supporters in the José León Suárez landfills before the declaration of martial law during an ill-fated attempt to return Peronism to power. Recounted in the book " Operación Masacre ". |
| Assault on the Banking Polyclinic | August 29, 1963 | Buenos Aires | 2 | The Tacuara Nationalist Movement robbed a bank, stealing almost 100,000 US dollars. 2 people died and 3 were injured. |
| Trelew massacre | August 22, 1972 | Trelew | 16 | Government members during the Dirty War torture and kill members of the left wing guerrilla group Montoneros |
| Ezeiza massacre | June 20, 1973 | Ezeiza | 13+ | Massacre of left-wing Peronists at rally celebrating his return from Spain at Ezeiza International Airport and 365+ Injured. Right-wing Peronists were blamed for the massacre. 13 victims were positively identified but more people may have been killed. |
| Rosario Chapel massacre | August 12, 1974 | San José de Fray Mamerto Esquiú, Catamarca Province | 16 | After a failed operation by the guerrilla organization ERP, 16 surrendered and unarmed guerrillas were illegally shot |
| Operation Gardel | August 28, 1975 | San Miguel de Tucumán, Tucumán | 6 | Operation Gardel was the key name given by the Montoneros to the bombing of a Lockheed C-130 Hercules of Group 1 of Transport of the First Air Brigade during takeoff at the International Airport Lieutenant General Benjamín Matienzo, carrying 114 gendarmes, killing six and wounding 29. |
| Operation Primicia | October 5, 1975 | Formosa | 32+ | A group of 50 guerrillas assaulted the Infantry Regiment of Monte 29, the Subofficers' Casino of that force and the Airport El Pucú. The event was called by its perpetrators as Operation Primicia. |
| Battle of Acheral | October 10, 1975 | Acheral, Tucumán province | 14 | At least one soldier and 13 ERP militants were shot dead in a confrontation of the so-called Operativo Independencia. |
| Monte Chingolo attack | December 23–24, 1975 | Monte Chingolo, Buenos Aires | 100+ | A failed assault on the Battalion Arsenals Depot 601 Domingo Viejobueno, in the town of Monte Chingolo, was the last great action of the People's Revolutionary Army. It aimed to appropriate 20 tons of weaponry. The attack was frustrated by the Argentine army, Federal Police and Police of the Province of Buenos Aires, and the Air Force. 30 guerrillas who surrendered were later shot dead by the army. |
| Coordinación Federal bombing | July 2, 1976 | Buenos Aires | 23 | Montoneros attacked the Federal Security Superintendency (also known as Federal Coordination) of the Federal Police, causing the collapse of the roof of the dining room when the place was full of officers having lunch. 23 people died, including one female civilian who was visiting, and about 110 were injured, in response for the coup d'état of March 24. |
| San Patricio Church massacre | July 4, 1976 | Belgrano, Buenos Aires | 5 | Government officials execute three priests and two seminarians during the Dirty War. |
| Fatima Massacre | August 20, 1976 | Fátima | 30 | Prisoners in the custody of the federal police – illegally detained – were drugged, shot, and later their bodies were blown up to hide evidence of the crime |
| Catriel massacre | September 4, 1976 | Bahía Blanca, Buenos Aires | 4 | Four Peronist Youth militants were murdered by firing squad |
| Rosario Bombing | September 12, 1976 | Rosario | 11 | A bomb blast kills ten policemen and two civilians and injures at least 30 people. |
| Massacre of Margarita Belén | December 13, 1976 | Margarita Belén, Chaco Province | 22 | 22 Montoneros were tortured and executed, and the case was used during one of the first trials of Jorge Rafael Videla. |
| Villa Devoto uprising | March 14, 1978 | Devoto prison, Devoto, Buenos Aires | 65 | 85 injuries At least 65 people died And 85 injuries from asphyxiation, burns or gunshot wounds inflicted by members of the Federal Penitentiary Service |
| Walter De Giusti murders | October 31 – November 7, 1986 | Santa Fe, Santa Fe Province | 5 | The Serial killer Walter de Giusti breaks into two houses and murders all its occupants. On October 31, he kills Ángela Cristofanetti de Barroso and her stepdaughter Noemí; 7 days later he murders the grandmothers of the musician Fito Páez and a domestic employee. |
| José C. Paz massacre | January 8, 1988 | José C. Paz, Buenos Aires Province | 4 | Easy Trigger Case |
| Attack on La Tablada barracks | January 23–24, 1989 | La Tablada, Buenos Aires Province | 39 | 60 Wounded |
| Carapintada uprising | December 3, 1990 | Buenos Aires | 14 | 200 Wounded |
| 1992 attack on Israeli embassy in Buenos Aires | March 17, 1992 | Buenos Aires | 30 | 242 civilians injured. An Islamic Jihad suicide bomber rams his car into the Israeli embassy, destroying the embassy and a Catholic church and school that were nearby. Many of the dead were children. Argentina accused Hezbollah of being involved in the attack. |
| Ricardo Barreda murders | November 15, 1992 | La Plata, Buenos Aires Province | 4 | Dentist Ricardo Barreda murders his wife, two daughters and mother-in-law |
| AMIA bombing | July 18, 1994 | Asociación Mutual Israelita Argentina, Buenos Aires | 86 | A suicide bomber rammed his car into the building of the Asociación Mutual Israelita Argentina (Argentine Israelite Mutual Association) killing 85 people and injuring 300+. The bombing has never been officially solved, but Argentina, Israel and the United States accused Hezbollah and Iran of being behind the attack and Argentina named 21-year-old Hezbollah operative Ibrahim Hussein Berro as the bomber |
| Río Tercero explosion | November 3, 1995 | Río Tercero, Córdoba | 7 | A series of explosions destroyed a military factory. The courts confirmed that it was an intentional attack carried out to cover up arms smuggling to Ecuador and Croatia. |
| Sierra Chica Prison Riot | March 30 - April 7, 1996 | Sierra Chica Prison, Sierra Chica, Olavarría Partido, Buenos Aires Province | 9 | A group of men deprived of liberty who were called the ‘Twelve Apostles’ took 17 hostages, killed eight people and cooked food from their body parts. |
| 2000 Floresta shooting | December 29, 2000 | Buenos Aires | 3 | Members of the Argentine Federal Police fired against a group of protesters who were protesting in the Plaza de Mayo. As a result, 5 people were killed and 227 were injured. |
| 2001 Massacre of Plaza de Mayo | December 20, 2001 | Buenos Aires | 5 | Juan de Dios Velaztiqui opened fire on 3 people, killing all 3, before being arrested for public disturbances. |
| Avellaneda massacre | June 26, 2002 | Darío Santillán and Maximiliano Kosteki Station, Buenos Aires Province | 2 | 33 Wounded |
| Carmen de Patagones school shooting | September 28, 2004 | Carmen de Patagones, Buenos Aires Province | 3 | Armed with his father's 9 mm pistol, Rafael Solich a 15-year-old student opened fire on his classmates during a flag-hoisting at Islas Malvinas Middle School Number Two in Carmen de Patagones, Argentina, killing three students and wounding 5 others. |
| 2006 San Miguel shooting | May 3, 2006 | La Primera de Grand Bourg, San Miguel, Buenos Aires | 2 | 55-year-old former employee Eugenio Villela opened fire on his past co-workers, killing two people and wounding four others before fleeing the scene. |
| Triple crime in General Rodríguez | August 13, 2008 | General Rodríguez | 3 | Torture and deaths of Three pharmaceutical businessmen |
| 2013 Argentine police revolts | December 3–13, 2013 | Argentina | 18 | 400+ Wounded |
| Pergamino massacre | March 2, 2017 | Pergamino, Buenos Aires Province | 7 | |
