= Workers' Revolutionary Party (Argentina) =

1960s–1970s Argentine Marxist political party

Workers' Revolutionary Party Partido Revolucionario de los Trabajadores
- Abbreviation: PRT
- Secretary-General: Mario Roberto Santucho (1965-1976); Luis Mattini (1976-1980)
- Founded: 1965
- Dissolved: 1980
- Headquarters: Argentina
- Newspaper: El Combatiente
- Armed wing: People's Revolutionary Army
- Ideology: Marxism–Leninism; Guevarism; Trotskyism (minority)
- Political position: Far-left
- Colors: Red

Party flag

The Workers' Revolutionary Party (Spanish: Partido Revolucionario de los Trabajadores, PRT) was a Marxist political party in Argentina, mainly active in the 1960s and 1970s. Currently there are different groups that claim to be a continuation of the historical PRT.

The PRT was founded in 1965 by Mario Roberto Santucho (FRIP) and Leandro Fote by merging two existing far-left political parties.

== History ==
The origins of the PRT lay in the merger of two leftist organizations in 1965, the Revolutionary and Popular Indoamericano Front (Frente Revolucionario Indoamericano Popular (FRIP)) and Worker's Word (Palabra Obrera (PO).

The FRIP had been founded by Francisco René Santucho and his brother Mario Roberto in 1961 at Santiago del Estero, Argentina. It was a ruralist, indigenist (pro-Amerindian) and revolutionary movement that extended its influence throughout the provinces of Tucumán, Chaco and Salta. Palabra Obrera, on the other hand was a Trotskyist party founded by Nahuel Moreno, active in the trade unions. Its main strategy had been infiltrating sectors of the Peronist movement in order to win them over to socialism.

In 1968 the PRT adhered to the Fourth International, based in Paris. That same year a related organisation was founded in Argentina, the ERP (People's Revolutionary Army) that became the strongest rural guerrilla movement in South America during the 1970s. The PRT left the Fourth International in 1973.

Both the PRT and the ERP were suppressed by the Argentine military regime during the Dirty War. ERP commander Roberto Santucho was killed in July 1976. Owing to the ruthless repression PRT showed no signs of activity after 1977.

== Leaders ==
- Benito Urteaga
- Enrique Gorriarán Merlo
- Mario Roberto Santucho

== See also ==
- Operativo Independencia
