= Foco =

Theory of revolution by way of guerrilla warfare

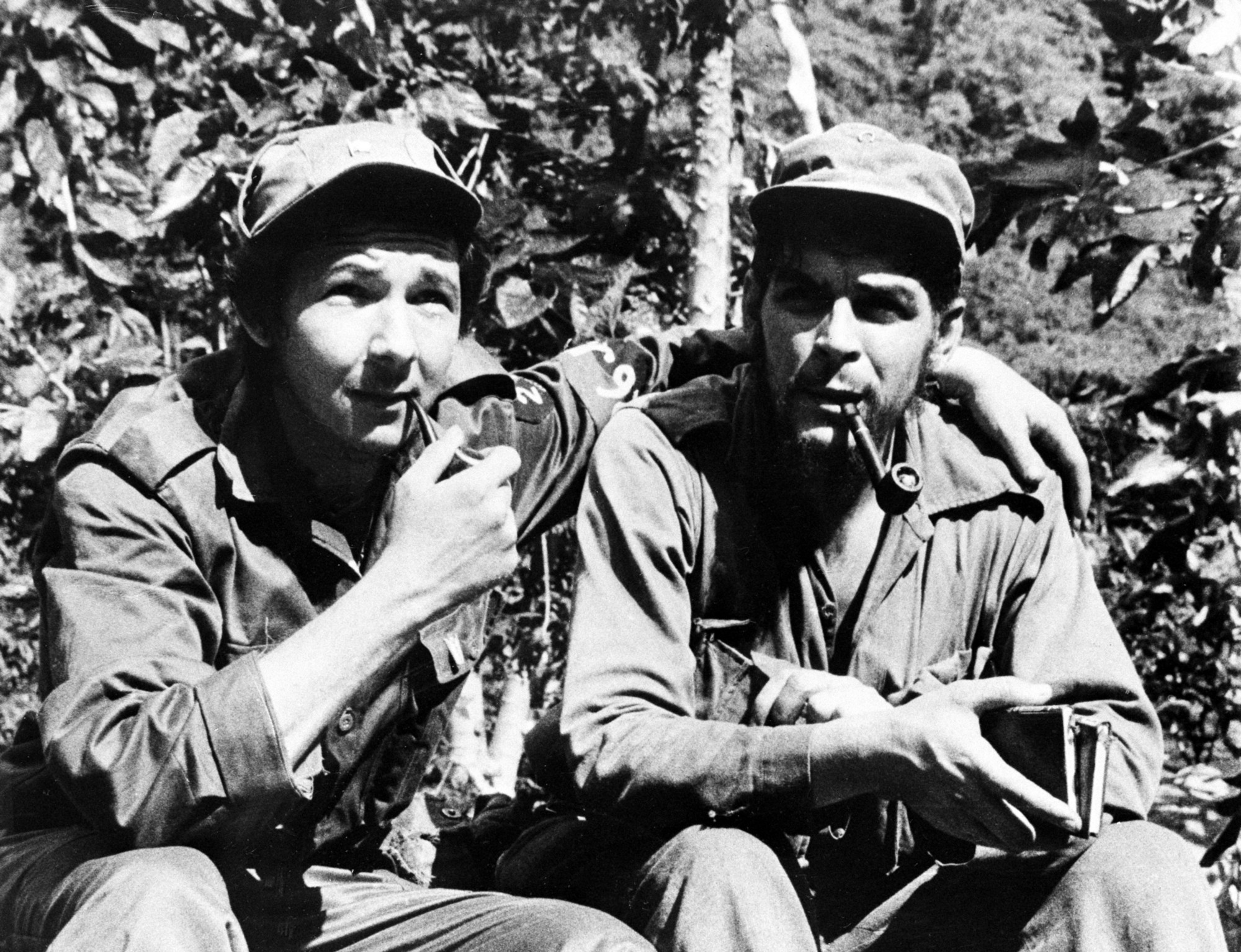
Raúl Castro (left) and Che Guevara (right) in their Sierra de Cristal Mountain stronghold south of Havana, in 1958. It was during this time as a guerrilla commander in the Cuban Revolution, that Guevara would base his theory of a foco-centered revolution.

A guerrilla foco is a small cadre of revolutionaries operating in a nation's countryside. This guerrilla organization was popularized by Che Guevara in his book Guerrilla Warfare, which was based on his experiences in the Cuban Revolution. Guevara would go on to argue that a foco was politically necessary for the success of a socialist revolution. Originally Guevara theorized that a foco was only useful in overthrowing personalistic military dictatorships and not liberal democratic capitalism where a peaceful overthrow was believed possible. Years later, Guevara would revise his thesis and argue all nations in Latin America, including liberal democracies, could be overthrown by a guerrilla foco. Eventually the foco thesis would be that political conditions would not even need to be ripe for revolutions to be successful, since the sheer existence of a guerrilla foco would create ripe conditions by itself. Guevara's theory of foco, known as foquismo (Spanish: [foˈkizmo]), was self-described as the application of Marxism-Leninism to Latin American conditions, and would later be further popularized by author Régis Debray. The proposed necessity of a guerrilla foco proved influential in Latin America, but was also heavily criticized by other socialists.

This theory of foco proved heavily influential among armed militants around the world. Che Guevara's success in the Cuban Revolution was seen as proof of his thesis and thus popularized foco theory. Some of the famous militant groups to adopt foco theory included the Red Army Faction, Irish Republican Army, and Weather Underground. The theory became especially popular in the New Left for its breaking with the strategy of incremental political change supported by the Soviet Union, while also encouraging the possibility of immediate revolution.

== Background ==
=== Cuban Revolution ===
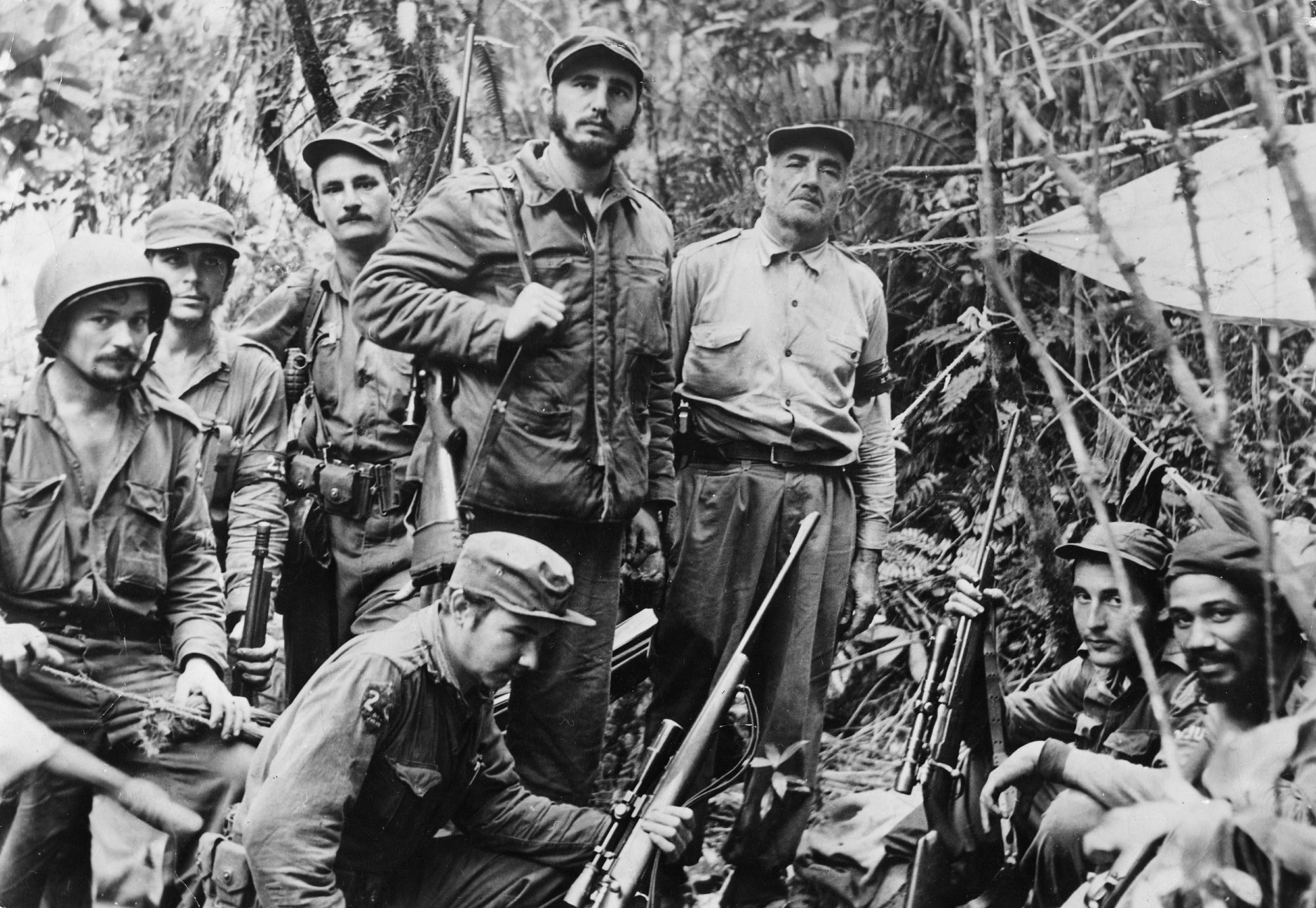
Fidel Castro and his small band of rebels in 1956. This small rebel army would eventually win the Cuban Revolution.

Foco theory was originally based on Che Guevara's experiences in the Cuban Revolution, in which he was party of a guerrilla army of 82 members who landed in Cuba on board of the Granma in December 1956 and initiated a guerrilla war in the Sierra Maestra. During two years, the poorly armed escopeteros, at times fewer than 200 men, won victories against Fulgencio Batista's army and police force, which numbered between 30,000 and 40,000 in strength. The 26th of July Movement (M-26-7) itself had a rural guerrilla army as well as an urban underground that participated in the revolution. Che Guevara often accused the urban section of the movement as being without proper radicalism, which stirred internal controversy. The urban wing was responsible for arming the rural guerrillas and engaged in its own urban warfare campaign. During the final months of the revolution an alliance of the Revolutionary Directorate of 13 March Movement, Popular Socialist Party, Authentic Party and 26th of July Movement was able to overthrow the Batista government. In their new provisional government the M-26-7 rebel army garnered the most popularity and influence.

=== Documenting the Cuban Revolution ===
Che Guevara played an integral role as one of the first historians of the Cuban Revolution. After the revolutionaries' victory, Guevara published various articles in Cuba of his experiences in the revolution. These articles helped formalize his foco theory and a history of the Cuban Revolution that stressed the role of the rural guerrillas as the main revolutionary force. This idea of the lone rural guerrillas deciding the revolution became immediately popular among the rebel army while consolidating their new government, and became a driving force in Cuban politics as a nation-building myth. Many early proponents saw the potential of repeating the model of the Cuban Revolution throughout Latin America, and often encouraged it.

== Theory ==
=== Rural guerrilla strategy ===
While foco theory drew from previous Marxist–Leninist ideas and the Maoist strategy of "protracted people's war", it simultaneously broke with many of the mid-Cold War era's established communist parties. Despite Nikita Khrushchev's eager support for "wars of national liberation" and the foco's own enthusiasm for Soviet Union patronage, Cuba's own Popular Socialist Party had retreated from active confrontation with the Fulgencio Batista regime and Castroism/Guevarism substituted the foco militia for the more traditional vanguard party.

Like other communist and socialist theorists of his era (such as Mao Zedong and Ho Chi Minh), Che Guevara believed that people living in countries still ruled by colonial powers, or living in countries subject to newer forms of economic exploitation, could best defeat colonial powers by taking up arms. Guevara also believed in fostering armed resistance not by concentrating one's forces in urban centers but rather through the accumulation of strength in mountainous and rural regions where the enemy had less presence.

In Guerrilla Warfare (La Guerra de Guerrillas), Guevara did not count on a Leninist insurrection led by the proletariat, as had happened during the 1917 October Revolution, but on popular uprisings which would gain strength in rural areas and would overthrow the regime. The vanguard guerrilla was supposed to bolster the population's morale, not to take control of the state apparatus itself and this overthrow would occur without any external or foreign help. According to him, guerrillas were to be supported by conventional armed forces:

It is well established that guerrilla warfare constitutes one of the phases of war; this phase can not, on its own, lead to victory.

Guevara added that this theory was formulated for developing countries and that the guerrilleros had to look for support among both the workers and the peasants.

=== Guerrilla "new man" ===
The guerrilla foco will be able to draw the support of the rural peasantry by demonstrating impeccable moral character and self-sacrifice. In the armed struggle the guerrillas themselves would be shaped by hardship into individuals who had an affinity for solidarity and justice. Once the guerrillas overthrow the existing government and come into power, the moral spirit of the guerrillas would become the national ethos of the new government.

== Legacy ==
=== Authoritarian reaction ===
Many who opposed the formation of leftist guerrillas took a focused approach to extinguish rural rebel groups from forming who were inspired by foquismo. These measures were often supported by the United States and involved torturing and enforced disappearance of political enemies. The development of guerrilla focos in various Latin American countries has been a factor proposed by historians in legitimizing military takeovers of their respective nations in order to defend against guerrillas.

=== Argentina's People's Revolutionary Army ===
In Argentina, the People's Revolutionary Army (ERP), led by Roberto Santucho, attempted to create a foco in the Tucumán Province. The attempt failed after the government of Isabel Perón signed in February 1975 the secret presidential decree 261, which ordered the army to neutralize and/or annihilate the ERP. Destined to collapse without any external pressure, ERP was not supported by a foreign power and lacked support of the working class. Operativo Independencia gave power to the Argentine Armed Forces to "execute all military operations necessary for the effects of neutralizing or annihilating the action of subversive elements acting in the Province of Tucumán."

== Criticism ==
=== Urban guerilla strategists ===
Abraham Guillén was a writer who frequently made studies of urban warfare in European revolutions and a noted critic of foco theory. While he agreed with Guevara in their shared criticism of American imperialism, Guillén argued that the foco strategy was unideal compared to a strategy of urban warfare. Guillén regarded the foco as petit-bourgeois in origin. He regarded that very few peasants and workers actually joined these guerilla armies. He also argued that these rural guerillas only supplied for easy victories by the reigning state power who could easily defeat isolated rebels in the countryside who lacked connections to military resources. Guillén instead argued revolution was possible during dire political crisis, with a mass workers alliance, and taking place in urban centers where most modernized nations populations resided.

The Tupamaros guerillas of Uruguay are also noted critics of foco theory. While the Tupamaros agreed with much of Guevara's theory of revolution, they argued that the rural theatre was inefficient for a rebel army. The urban setting houses a greater population which means more sympathizers to rely on. A rural setting is also open to military attack while a city is more populated and delicate which discourages open combat by the state.

== See also ==
- National Liberation Army (Bolivia)
- Araguaia Guerrilla War (Brazil)
- Revolutionary Armed Forces of Colombia
- National Liberation Army (Colombia)
- Oriental Revolutionary Movement (Uruguay)
- Paraguayan People's Army
- Fidel Castro
- Wars of national liberation
