= Fatima massacre =

1976 mass murder in Buenos Aires, Argentina

Coordinates: 34°26′41.28″S 58°58′52.1″W

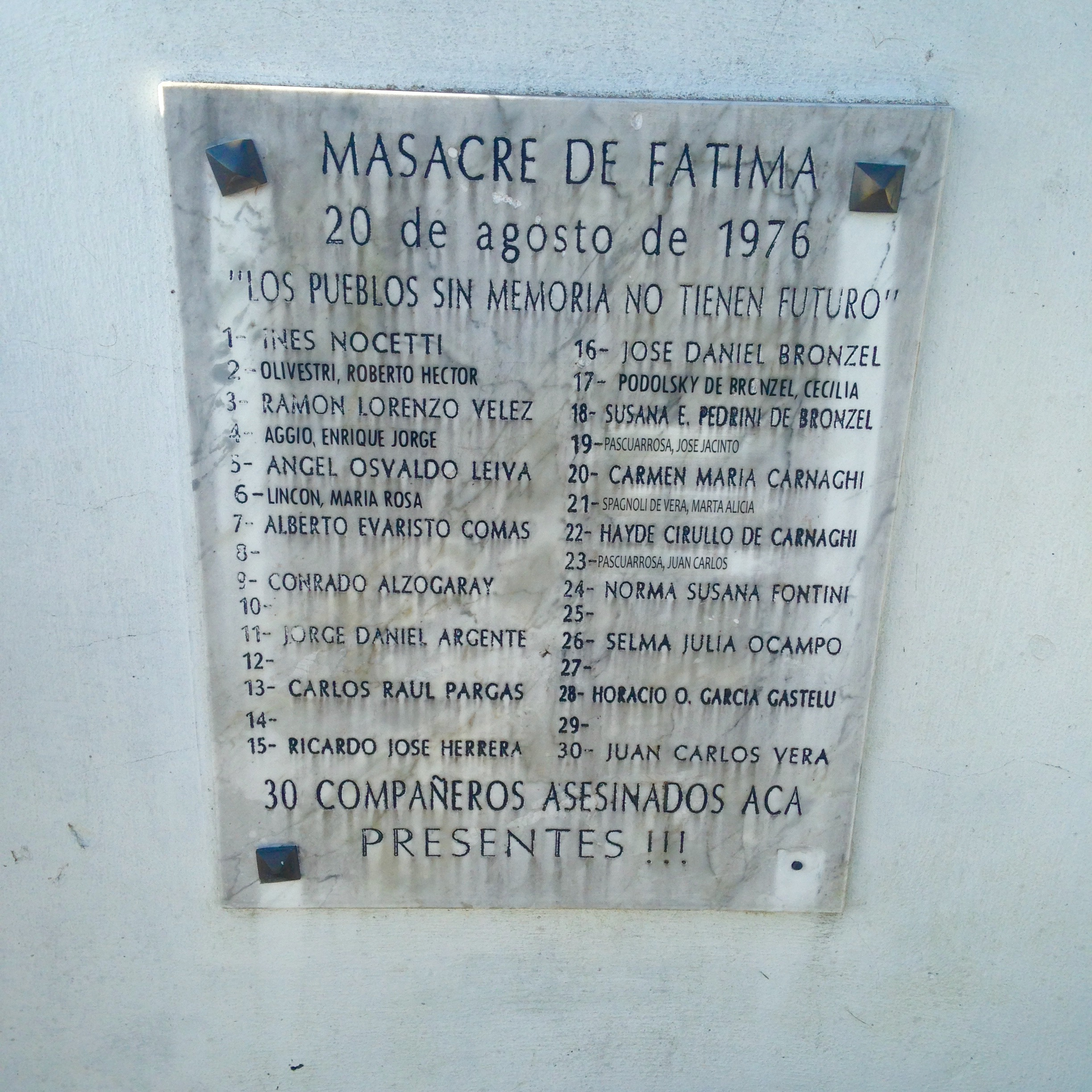
plaque memorializing the event and victims; third line inscription translates as "towns(folk) without memory have no future", or perhaps less literally, "a community that fails to remember, fails"

The Fatima massacre refers to an incident in Fátima, Buenos Aires, Argentina, where 30 prisoners in the custody of the federal police were illegally detained, drugged and shot. On August 20, 1976, the bodies of the victims were blown up.

== Events ==
Shortly after four o'clock on the morning of August 20, a loud explosion woke inhabitants of Fatima. Workers at a nearby brick foundry arrived on scene and claimed they had found human remains scattered over an area of one hundred yards, presumably a result of the explosion. Almost immediately the area was fenced by soldiers. Photojournalists who had taken photos were kidnapped. The soldiers and civilian staff collected the body parts and loaded them onto a truck of the Municipality of Pilar.

According to the police, the victims were thirty people, ten women and twenty men, including some teenagers. Only five could be identified at the time. The bodies of the unidentified victims were buried in Derqui Pte Cemetery, where they were exhumed years later for identification.

The Argentine Forensic Anthropology Team was able to identify eleven more victims. One of the first was Susana Pedrini of Bronzel, after whom they named a street in the center of Pilar, specifically in the square near the water tank.. Pedrini, who was abducted together with her husband and her mother, was two and a half months pregnant when she was killed. Only half of the victims could be identified by family and friends through the work of the Argentine Forensic Anthropology Team.

On July 11, 2008, two former Argentine police officers were sentenced to life in prison without parole for their role in the killings.

== Identified victims ==
Listed as numbered on the commemorative plaque pictured above:

1. Ines Nocetti
2. Olivetti, Roberto Hector
3. Ramon Lorenzo Yelez
4. Aggio, Enrique Jorge
5. Angel Osvaldo Leiva
6. Lincoln, Maria Rosa
7. Alberto Evaristo Comas
8. [blank]
9. Conrad(o) Alzogaray
10. [blank]
11. (Jorge) Daniel Argente
12. [blank]
13. Carlos Raul Pargas
14. [blank]
15. (Raul) Ricardo Jose Herrera
16. Joseph/Jose Daniel Bronzel
17. Poddleky de Bronzel, Cecilia
18. Susana E. Pedrini de Bronzel
19. Pascliarrosa, Jose Jacinto
20. Carmen Maria Carnaghi
21. Pascliarrosa, Juan Carlos
22. Pangoli de Vera, Marta Alida
23. Haydee Cirullo de Carnaghi
24. Norma Susana Fontini
25. [blank]
26. Selma Julia Ocampo
27. [blank]
28. Horacio O. Garcia Gastelu
29. [blank]
30. Juan Carlos Vera

== See also ==
- List of massacres in Argentina
