= Liliana Delfino =

Argentine Marxist militant (1944–1976)

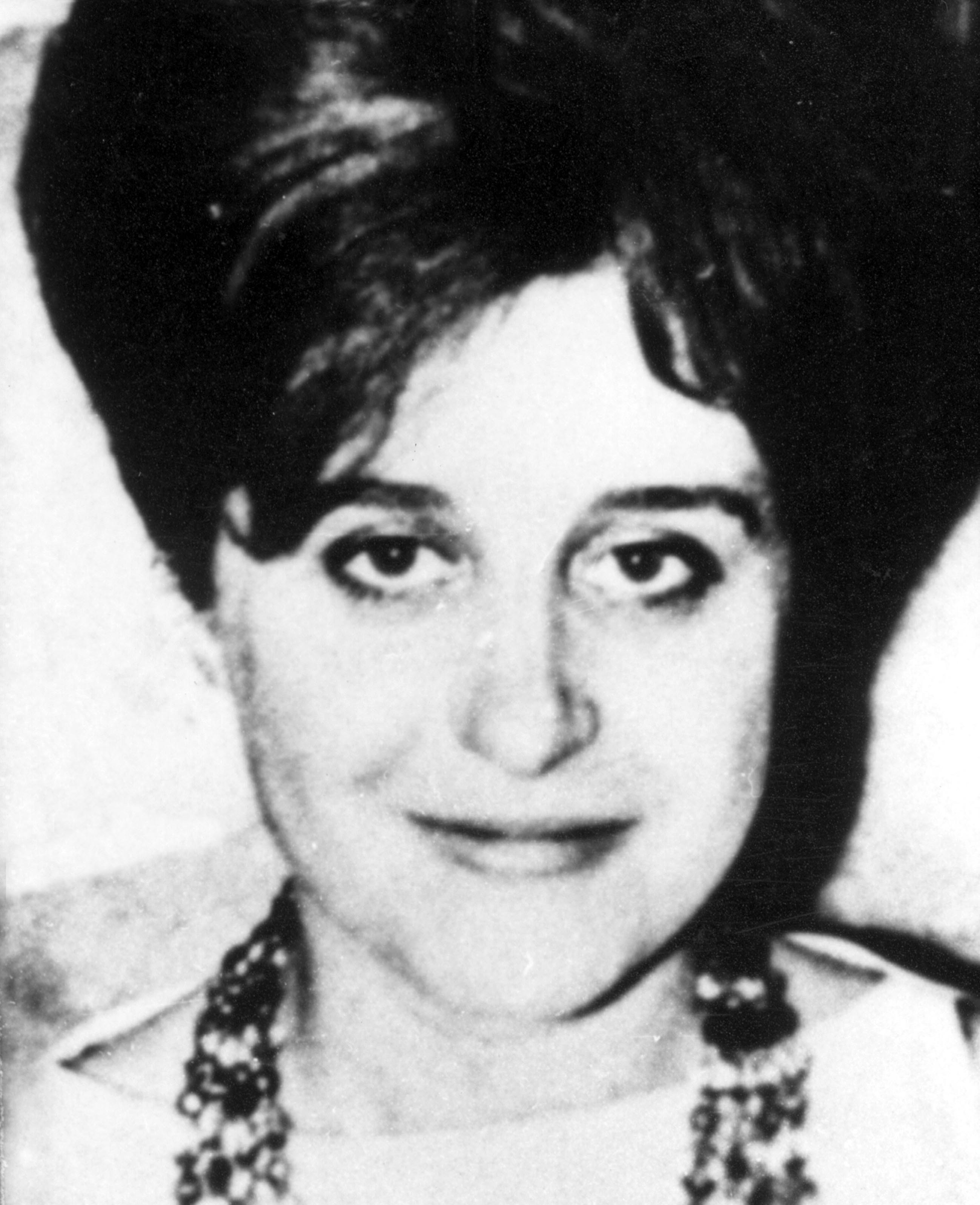

Liliana Delfino was an Argentine Marxist militant. She was born in Rosario, province of Santa Fe, Argentina, on 16 June 1944, She was kidnapped on 19 July 1976 in the town of Villa Martelli, province of Buenos Aires. Along with her husband Mario Roberto Santucho, she was among the leaders of ERP, an armed Marxist organization. She was arrested and killed by the military in 1976. Her body was never found.

Her father, Ángel Delfino, was an immigrant from Piedmont, Italy, who had been a soldier in the Italian army during World War I and later sympathized with fascism. Once settled in Argentina, he was a commercial employee, he married Carlina Adelina Jedliczka, a teacher from Cañada de Gómez with whom he had two children: Liliana and Mario.
