= Sallustro =

Sallustro is a surname. Notable people with the surname include:

- Attila Sallustro (1908–1983), Italian-Paraguayan footballer
- Oberdan Sallustro (1915–1972), Italian-Paraguayan businessman
