= Operation Independence =

1975–77 Argentine victory in the Dirty War

- Part of the Dirty War
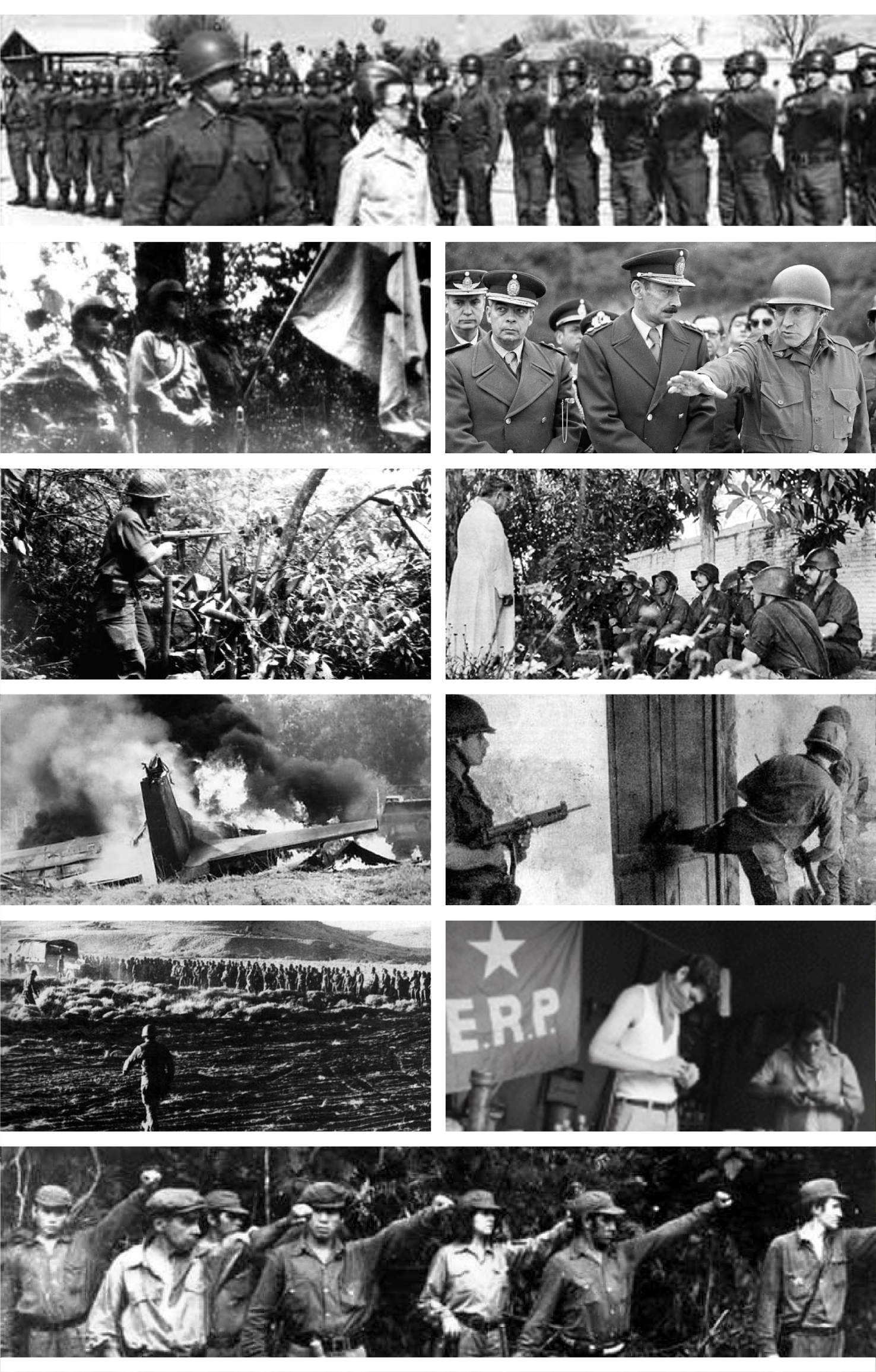
Date	5 February 1975 – 28 September 1977 (2 years, 7 months, 3 weeks and 2 days)
Location	Tucumán Province, Argentina
Result	Argentine government victory

Belligerents
Argentina; Supported by: United States; Bolivia; Brazil; Chile; Paraguay; Uruguay	ERP; Montoneros Supported by: Cuba

Commanders and leaders
Antonio Bussi; Ítalo Luder; Acdel Vilas	Roberto Santucho †; Benito Urteaga †; Enrique Gorriarán Merlo; Jorge Carlos Molina †; Mario Firmenich; Juan Alsogaray †; Dardo Cabo (executed); Francisco Urondo †

Strength
5,000	500; 30–100

Casualties and losses
84 killed; 3 aircraft; 2 helicopters	300 killed

Operativo Independencia ("Operation Independence") was a 1975 Argentine military operation in Tucumán Province to crush the People's Revolutionary Army (ERP), a Guevarist guerrilla group which tried to create a Vietnam-style war front in the northwestern province. It was the first large-scale military operation of the Dirty War.

== Background ==
After the return of Juan Perón to Argentina, marked by the 20 June 1973 Ezeiza massacre which led to the split between left and right-wing Peronists, and then his return to the presidency in 1973, the ERP shifted to a rural strategy designed to secure a large land area as a base for military operations against the Argentine state. The ERP leadership chose to send Compañía de Monte Ramón Rosa Jiménez to the province of Tucumán at the edge of the long-impoverished Andean highlands in the northwest corner of Argentina.

The People's Guerrilla Army (EGP) campaign in Salta (1963–1964) served as Argentina's first disastrous experiment with Cuban-style foquismo. Initiated by journalist Jorge Ricardo Masetti and Cuban officer Hermes Peña Torres ("Captain Hermes") under the guidance of Che Guevara, the small vanguard attempted to ignite a revolution from the isolated, rugged cloud forests of Orán. However, because they relied on the theory that a tiny armed nucleus could spark a rebellion without prior political roots, they quickly found themselves completely isolated from the local population. Plagued by tropical diseases and near-total starvation, the group collapsed from within—culminating in the tragic summary executions of their own panicked recruits, before being easily dismantled by the National Gendarmerie in mid-1964.

Mario Roberto Santucho and the PRT-ERP deeply analyzed this failure, transforming the tragedy of the EGP into a definitive negative blueprint for how not to wage a rural insurgency. Rejecting Masetti's isolated strategy, Santucho realized that a guerrilla army could not survive in a vacuum; it required a robust political party deeply embedded in the working class to provide a permanent urban-rural logistics lifeline and prevent psychological collapse. When the ERP launched its own rural front (Frente Rural) in 1974, Santucho deliberately chose Tucumán Province over Salta because the terrain offered the same tactical jungle cover but was highly populated and anchored by radicalized sugarcane worker unions. By capitalizing on years of prior political organizing among these workers, the ERP successfully secured the 2,500-person civilian support and intelligence network that the EGP had fatally lacked a decade earlier.

By December 1974, the guerrillas numbered about 100 fighters, with a 400-person support network, although the size of the guerrilla platoons increased from February onwards as the ERP approached its maximum strength of between 300 and 500 men and women. Led by Mario Roberto Santucho, they soon established control over a third of the province and organized a base of some 2,500 sympathizers. The Montoneros' leadership was keen to learn from their experience, and sent "observers" to spend a few months with the ERP platoons operating in Tucumán.

According to the findings of Antonius Robben in his book, in all 84 members of the Argentine Armed Forces and Police were killed in clashes involving left-wing guerrillas and supporting militants in Tucumán Province.

Tucumán Province had experienced a number of violent episodes in the early 1970s. Montoneros gunmen operating in the province on 9 October 1970 had shot and killed a policeman (Juan Carlos Ceballos).

The Montoneros would later kill, on 9 de September 1971, another policeman (Juan Carlos Vallejo) in the suburb of Yerba Buena of the city of San Miguel de Tucumán.

On 6 September 1971, an ERP platoon had broken into the Villa Urquiza Prison in Tucumán and freed 12 of their guerrillas, killing 5 prison guards (Raúl Villagra, Saul Carlos Rojas, José Rosas Abregú, Néstor Lobos and Juan Ordóñez) in the process.

On 27 July 1972, Montoneros and FAR (Fuerzas Armadas Revolucionarias) guerrillas had robbed weapons and uniforms from a local police station and killed two policemen inside.

On 5 August 1973, ERP gunmen traveling in a car had intercepted and shot and killed in a hail of fire a police inspector (Major Hugo Tomagnini) in Tucumán. On 4 October 1973, the ERP guerrillas operating in the province struck again, shooting and mortally wounding a policeman (Casimiro Reyes Mansilla).

On 22 May 1974, another Tucumán policeman (Vicente Marcelo Lazarte) is mortally wounded while conducting traffic control duties after coming under fire by a carload of ERP gunmen. On 20 September 1974, ERP guerrillas lined-up and executed two captured Tucumán Police NCOs, Eudoro Ibarra and Héctor Oscar Zaraspe, in a public square.

== Annihilation Actions decree ==
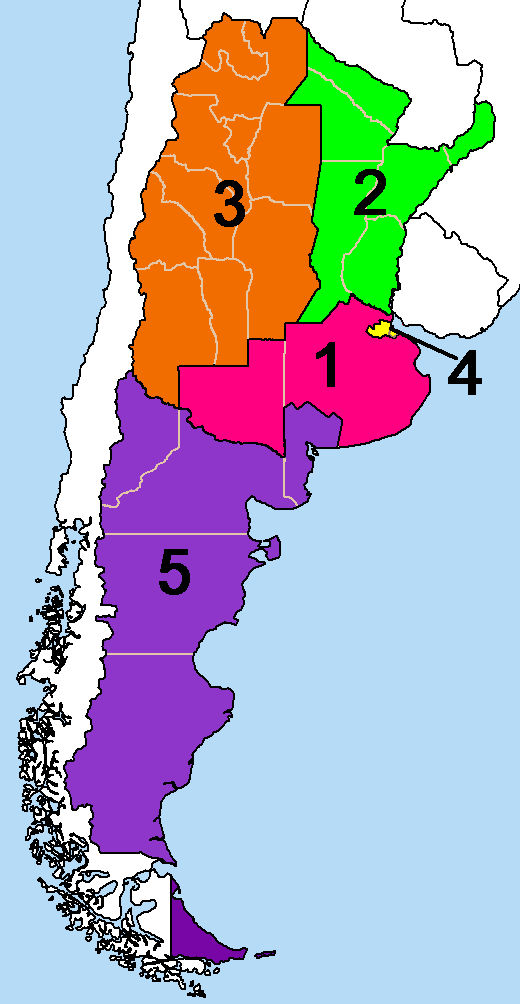
Military zones of Argentina

The military operation to crush the insurgency was authorized by the Provisional President of the Senate, Ítalo Argentino Luder, who was granted executive power during the absence (due to illness) of President Isabel Perón, in virtue of the "Ley de Acefalía" (law of succession). Ítalo Luder issued the presidential decree 261/1975 which stated that the "general command of the Army will proceed to all of the necessary military operations to the effect of neutralizing or annihilating the actions of the subversive elements acting in Tucumán Province."

The Argentine military used the territory of the smallest Argentine province to implement, within the framework of the National Security Doctrine, the methods of the "counter-revolutionary warfare". These included the use of terrorism, kidnappings, forced disappearances and concentration camps where hundreds of guerrillas and their supporters in Tucumán were tortured and murdered. The logistical and operational superiority of the military, headed first by General Acdel Vilas, and from December 1975 by Antonio Domingo Bussi, succeeded in crushing the insurgency after a year and by destroying links the ERP, led by Roberto Santucho, had earlier established with the local population.

Brigadier-General Acdel Vilas deployed over 4,000 soldiers, including two companies of elite army commandos, backed by jets, dogs, helicopters, U.S. satellites and a Navy Beechcraft Queen Air B-80 equipped with infrared surveillance assets. The ERP did have some crucial support from the local population where it planned to wage a guerrilla campaign and was initially able to initially move at will among the towns of Santa Lucía, Los Sosa, Monteros and La Fronterita around Famaillá and the Monteros mountains, until the Fifth Brigade from Third Army Corps came on the scene, consisting of the 19th, 20th and 29th Regiments. and various support units.

=== State of emergency ===
During his brief interlude as the nation's chief executive, interim President Ítalo Luder extended the operation to the whole of the country through Decrees noº 2270, 2271 and 2272, issued on 6 July 1975. The July decrees created a Defense Council headed by the president, and including his ministers and the chiefs of the armed forces. It was given the command of the national and provincial police and correctional facilities and its mission was to "annihilate the actions of subversive elements throughout the country." Military control and the state of emergency was thus generalized to all of the country. The "counter-insurgency" tactics used by the French during the 1957 Battle of Algiers —such as relinquishing of civilian control to the military, state of emergency, block warden system ("quadrillage"), etc.— were perfectly imitated by the Argentine military.

These "annihilation Action decrees" are the source of the charges against Isabel Perón, which called for her arrest in Madrid more than thirty years later, in January 2007, but she was never extradited to Argentina due to her advanced age. The country was then divided into five military zones through a 28 October 1975 directive of struggle against subversion. As had been done during the 1957 Battle of Algiers, each zone was divided in subzones and areas, with its corresponding military responsibles. General Antonio Domingo Bussi replaced Acdel Vilas in December 1975 as responsible of the military operations. A reported 656 people disappeared in Tucumán between 1974 and 1979, 75% of which were laborers and labor union officials.

== Operation ==
=== 1975 ===
On 5 January 1975, an Army DHC-6 transport plane was downed near the Monteros mountains while on a reconnaissance mission, apparently brought down down by Guerrillas operating heavy machine-guns or through sabotage. All thirteen on board that were killed, were mostly officers from Third Army Corps, including the Fifth Brigade commander, Brigadier-General Ricardo Agustín Muñoz and his superior Major-General Enrique Eugenio Salgado were killed. The military believe a heavy machine gun or sabotage had downed the aircraft.

The deployment on the ground was completed by 9 February. The guerrillas, who had laid low when the 5th Brigade first arrived, soon began to strike at the mountain units. On 14 February a 60-strong combat team under the command of Captain Juan Carlos Jones-Tamayo from the mountain brigade clashed with 20 guerrillas at Río Pueblo Viejo, and in the ensuing gun-battle 29-year old First Lieutenant Héctor Cáceres (a commando) was killed attempting to get to the aid of Lieutenant Rodolfo Richter (also a commando) that had been designated as point-man and had been badly wounded. Second Lieutenant Daniel Arias and Corporal Juan Orellana of the combat team were also wounded and two guerrillas were killed, Héctor Enrique Toledo and Víctor Pablo Lasser. On 24 February, while supporting troops on the ground, a Piper PA-18 crashed near the town of Ingenio Santa Lucía , killing its two crewmen. On 28 February, an army corporal, Desidero Dardo Pérez, was killed while inspecting an abandoned car rigged with an explosive charge in the city of Famaillá.

Three months of constant patrolling and 'cordon and search' operations with helicopter-borne troops soon reduced the ERP's effectiveness in the Famaillá area, so in June, elements of the 5th Brigade moved to the frontiers of Tucumán to guard against ERP and Montoneros guerrillas crossing into the province from Catamarca, and Santiago del Estero.

On 11 May, an Army officer, Second Lieutenant Raúl Ernesto García was killed while his unit manned a checkpoint during a fierce exchange of fire with a car-load of guerrillas travelling along Route 301 in Tucumán. The guerrilla that fired the fatal shot was identified as Wilfredo Contra Siles, a Bolivian national. That month, ERP representative Amílcar Santucho, brother of Roberto, was captured along with Jorge Fuentes Alarcón, a member of the Chilean Revolutionary Left Movement (MIR), trying to cross into Paraguay to promote the Revolutionary Coordinating Junta (JCR) unity effort with the MIR, the Uruguayan Tupamaros and the Bolivian National Liberation Army. During his interrogation, he provided information that helped the Argentine security agencies destroy the ERP.

On 28 May, a four-hour gun-battle took place between 117 guerrillas and the 32-strong 1st Platoon from the 5th Mountain Engineer Company that had been assigned to carrying out repairs as part of a hearts-and-minds campaign in the schools of Manchalá, Yacuchina, Yonopongo and Balderrama in the Tucumán countryside, resulting in several casualties on both sides. The guerrilla force, wearing Argentine Army uniforms to achieve total surprise, had been instructed to advance in a column of heavy vehicles to the very gates of the headquarters of the 5th Mountain Brigade and force their way in with the aim of seizing and killing the brigade commander and his key officers. In the face of heavy army reinforcements, the guerrillas broke off contact and escaped to their operating base in El Tiro via three routes, leaving two of their own dead, Domingo Villalobos Campos, a Chilean national, and Juan Carlos Irurtia. By July, the commandos were carrying out search-and-destroy missions in the mountains. Army special forces discovered Santucho's hideout in August, then raided the ERP urban headquarters in September.

Nevertheless, the military was not to have everything its way. On 16 August Corporal Miguel Dardo Juárez is shot dead in a gun battle that took place in Las Mesadas, with six guerrillas reportedly killed in that action. On 28 August, a bomb was planted at the Tucumán air base airstrip by Montoneros in the form of their "Marcos Osatinsky Platoon" in support of their comrades in the ERP. The blast destroyed an Air Force C-130 transport carrying 114 anti-guerrilla Gendarmerie commandos heading for home leave, killing six (First Sergeants Juan Esteban Riveros and Pedro Francisco Yáñez and Gendarmes Raúl Remberto Cuello, Marcelo Godoy, Francisco Evaristo Gómez and Juan Argentino Luna) and wounding 40. The following day saw the derailment of a train carrying troops back from the guerrilla front about 64 kilometers south of the city of Tucumán, this time without any casualties. Most of the Compañía de Monte's general staff were killed in a special forces raid in October, but the guerrilla units continued to fight.

On 5 September an army platoon operating outside Potrero Negro fell into an ERP ambush and the officer in charge, Second Lieutenant Rodolfo Berdina was mortally wounded and Private Ismael Maldonado was killed at the very start of the firefight.

On 7 October, four soldiers of the Argentine Army were reported killed after coming under heavy fire from part of a 30-strong ERP force that had take up advantageous positions on a height overlooking the Los Sosa River.

On the night of 8/9 October further fighting takes place near Los Sosa River as the rural guerrillas attempt to escape encirclement with the 28th Mountain Infantry Regiment reporting the loss of another soldier in the night action. In all the 5th Brigade reports the loss of five men (Privates Ramón Pío Fernández, Rogelio Ramón Espinoza, Juan Carlos Castillo, Enrique Ernesto Guastoni and Freddy Ordoñez) in this action that later became known as the Combate de Los Quinchos (Battle of Los Quinchos)

On 10 October, a UH-1H helicopter piloted by Second Lieutenant Oscar Delfino was hit by small arms fire during an offensive reconnaissance mission near Acheral, killing its door gunner, Corporal José Anselmo Ramírez and wounding Captain Armando Valiente (a commando). After an emergency landing, other helicopters carried out rocket attacks on the reedbed. A total of 13 guerrillas were reported killed in the ensuing firefight.

On 24 October, during another clash that took place with ERP guerrillas on the banks of Fronterista River, Second Lieutenant Diego Barceló and Privates Orlando Moya and Carlos Vizcarra from the 5th Brigade were killed.

On 8 November 1975 there was a further engagement near Fronterita Stream in which the 5th Brigade suffered another two killed, Corporal Wilfredo Napoleón Méndez and Private Benito Oscar Pérez.

On 18 December, Acdel Vilas was relieved of his post and Antonio Domingo Bussi assumed command of the operations. Shortly afterwards, Bussi told Vilas over the phone: "Vilas, you have left me nothing to do."

On 29 December, Bussi launched Operation La Madrid I, the first of a series of four major search-and-destroy operations.

=== 1976 ===
The mountain and parachute units remained essential as military support for the local police and gendarmerie security forces, as well as the apprehension of several hundred ERP and Montoneros guerrillas who were still operating in the jungles and mountains, and sympathizers hidden among the civilian population in what was described by the American newspaper Baltimore Sun as a "growing "'Viet war'" During the first week of January, the army commandos discovered seven guerrilla hideouts.

On 9 February 1976, during a celebratory dinner that was to take place in the 1st 'Patricios' Regiment Barracks in Buenos Aires in honour of Brigadier-General Acdel Vilas, an attempt was made to poison Vilas and those attending when Private First Class Miguel Romero an infiltrated agent of the Montoneros tampered with the soup that would be first served. But Brigadier-General Vilas became suspicious with the texture of the soup and the mass poisoning was averted. Romero was able to escape in the immediate confusion but he would be shot dead along with another guerrilla, Isidro Fernández, in a confrontation with security forces in the large industrial sector of Avellaneda in the Argentine capital.

During February, in an effort to rekindle the rural front in Tucumán, Montoneros sent in reinforcements in the form of a company of their elite "Jungle Troops", which was initially commanded by Juan Carlos Alsogaray (El Hippie), son of Lieutenant-General Julio Alsogaray, who had served as head of the Argentine Army from 1966 to 1968. The ERP also sent reinforcements to Tucumán in the form of their elite Decididos de Córdoba Company (Die-Hards of Córdoba) from Córdoba Province. Bussi achieved a major success on 13 February when the 14th Airborne Infantry Regiment killed "El Hippie" after ambushing his elite Montoneros company. Two paratroopers (Corporal Héctor Roberto Lazarte and Private Pedro Burguener) and some 10 guerrillas were killed in this battle. On 30 March, a policeman (Sergeant Pedro Oscar Fagioli) was gunned down and killed by left-wing miltants while patrolling in downtown Tucumán.

On 10 April, a Private Mario Gutiérrez from the 20th Mountain Infantry Regiment was killed in a nocturnal action involving ERP guerrillas operating in the Los Sosa area of the Monteros mountains. That same day, a policeman (Juan Carlos Gerardo Silvetti) was gunned down by three male and one female left-wing militants while he was standing guard at a hospital.

In mid-April, in a major operation conducted against the ERP underground network in the province of Córdoba, the 4th Airborne Infantry Brigade took into custody and forcibly disappeared some 300 activists. On 26 April, inspector general Juan Sirnio of the Tucumán Police was shot dead in his car by Montoneros guerrillas. The same day, the Montoneros guerrillas also killed a retired army colonel, Colonel, Abel Héctor Elías Cavagnaro outside his home in Tucumán.

On 5 May, during night mission, an army UH-1H crashed on the banks of Río Caspichango, killing five of its seven crew members, Captain José Antonio Ramallo, Lieutenant César Gonzalo Ledesma, Sergeant Walter Hugo Gómez and Corporals Carlos Alberto Parra and Ricardo Martín Zárate.

On 10 May, Private Carlos Alberto Fricker was shot dead by nervous sentries while stationed in Famaillá or died by suicide, although journalist Marcos Taire suggested that the Argentine Army was involved in a dastardly action resulting in the death of Fricker. Then Second Lieutenant César Milani would be signalled out as the officer responsible for the murder and disappearance of Private Fricker and a number of other conscript soldiers serving in the 5th Brigade at the time, and as future commander of the Argentine Army would face the full wrath of the Argentine press and forced to resign his post and spend time in jail until it was proven in a court of law that he never actually served in Tucumán province and was consequently absolved of charges of having committed crimes against humanity and released from jail.

On 17 May, Second Lieutenant Juan Toledo Pimentel, Sergeant Alberto Eduardo Lai and Private Carlos Alberto Cajal died in a remote-controlled bomb blast near the town of Caspinchango. In 2013, journalist Marcos Taire who appeared in the El Azúcar y la Sangre 2007 documentary praising the leftist militants in Tucumán, wrote that the Argentine military campaign in the province was a hoax and that the ambulance was blown up on purpose in an Argentine Army false-flag incident. The officer (César Milani) falsely accused of orchestrating the murders of Second Lieutenant Pimentel, Sergeant Lai and Private Cajal and others would spend considerable time in jail before being proven innocent in a court of law and set free.

On 28 July in the city of San Miguel de Tucumán, in a raid carried out on the premises located at 2588 Crisóstomo Alvarez Street, police chief of investigations Timoteo Marcial and two of his policemen are killed In a clash with guerrillas with the Montoneros losing two killed (28-year-old Jorgelina Almerares And her husband, 32-year-old Víctor Hugo Bernuchi) in this action. Another guerrilla, 23-year-old Ramón Héctor Gil is able to escape in the immediate confusion of the gun-battle. He would be hunted down and killed on 9 August 1976 at Banda del Rio Salí, Cruz Alta, Tucumán province in a joint operation involving the army and police.

On 19 October, the Compañía de Monte's commander, Lionel MacDonald, was gunned down along two other of his fighters. Throughout 1976, a total of 24 gun-battles took place in Tucumán province, resulting in the deaths of at least 74 guerrillas and supporting militants along with 18 soldiers and policemen in Tucumán Province. 1976 would prove to be a costly year for the Argentine Armed Forces and police with 156 officers, NCOs, conscripts and police agents killed combating left wing guerrillas and militants throughout Argentina.

== Veterans' demands ==
On 14 December 2007, some 200 soldiers who fought against the guerrillas in Tucumán province demanded an audience with the governor of Tucumán Province, José Jorge Alperovich, claiming they too were victims of the "Dirty War", and demanded a government sponsored military pension as veterans of the counter-insurgency campaign in northern Argentina.

Indeed, data from the 2,300-strong Asociación Ex-Combatientes del Operativo Independencia indicate that as of 1976, 4 times more Tucumán veterans have died from suicide after operations in the province. Critics of the ex-servicemen association claim that no combat operations took place in the province and that the government forces deployed in Tucumán killed more than 2,000 innocent civilians.

According to Professor Paul H. Lewis, a large percentage of the disappeared in Tucumán were in fact students, professors and recent graduates of the local university, all of whom were caught providing supplies and information to the guerrillas.

On 24 March 2008, some 2,000 Tucumán veterans of the 11,000-strong Movimiento Ex Soldados del Operativo Independencia y del Conflicto Limítrofe con Chile, who fought against ERP guerrillas and were later redeployed along the Andes in the military standoff with Chile, took to the streets of Tucumán city to demand recognition as combat veterans. '

Some 180,000 Argentine conscripts saw service during the military dictatorship (1976–1983), 130 died as a result of the Dirty War.
