= St. Brendan's Rugby Club =

(Argentina) St. Brendan's
- Full name: St. Brendan's Rugby Club
- Union: URBA
- Founded: 29 October 2004; 20 years ago
- Location: Buenos Aires, Argentina
- Ground(s): Fátima, Buenos Aires
- Chairman: Tibor Teleki
- President: Alejandro Salemme
- Coach(es): Marcelo Manfrino
- League(s): Torneo de la URBA Grupo II
- 2016: 11° of Reubicación G2
| 1st kit | 2nd kit |

St. Brendan's Rugby Club, or St. Brendan's, is an Argentine rugby union and field hockey club located in the city of Fátima, Buenos Aires. The rugby union team currently plays in the Torneo de la URBA Grupo II, the second division of the Unión de Rugby de Buenos Aires league system.
