= Battle of Acheral =

- Part of Operativo Independencia
Date	10 October 1975
Location	Acheral, Tucumán province, Argentina
Result	Argentine Army victory

Belligerents
Argentina	People's Revolutionary Army

Commanders and leaders
Acdel Vilas	Jorge Carlos Molina †

Units involved
Argentine Army Aconquija Task Force Ibatín Task Force	Ramón Rosa Giménez Mountain Company

Strength
45–93 soldiers 3 helicopters	13 guerrillas

Casualties and losses
1 killed 1 wounded 1 helicopter damaged	13 killed

The Battle of Acheral was fought near the San Gabriel stream, some 3 km away from the small town of Acheral, Tucumán province, Argentina. It was a turning point in the Operativo Independencia, a domestic Argentine military intervention aimed at eradicating guerrilla activities in Tucumán province, as well as eliminating so-called subversive elements. This action received nationwide media coverage due to the presence of two journalists from Gente magazine at the time.

== Background ==
The PRT-ERP learned of a daily military supply transport between Acheral and Tafí del Valle and decided to carry out an ambush on 7 October. On that day, the guerrillas detected a nearby Army task force and opted to attack it. A guerrilla and a soldier perished in the subsequent fighting.

In the early hours of 8 October, a conscript and Jorge Carlos Molina (nom de guerre "captain Pablo") were killed in another Army ambush. During the next 48 hours, another two skirmishes near the Santa Lucía sugar mill resulted in the deaths of Oscar Asdrúbal Santucho (nom de guerre "captain Aníbal") and Manuel Negrín (nom de guerre "lieutenant Roberto").

== Battle ==
Santucho had ordered the supply of armament to a thirteen-man National Logistics team in the San Gabriel stream, along National Route 38.

At 06:00, the guerrillas were detected hiding in a reedbed. This information reached a task force at 10:30, which in turn relayed it to its superior officers, who ordered three Bell UH-1 Iroquois attack helicopters to be sent to the area.

At 11:38, during the third reconnaissance flight over the area, one of the helicopters detected one or two ERP fighters and opened fire. The guerrillas responded with concentrating fire, killing its door gunner and damaging its electrical system. The pilot, who was also wounded, made an emergency landing 80 meters from the site. Meanwhile, ground troops opened fire at the guerrillas. At noon, another helicopter fired two 70mm air-to-ground rockets, setting the reedbed on fire. General Vilas arrived an hour later in a third helicopter along with two journalists. The strafing and rocket attacks carried on until after 17:00. A mopping-up operation began after another two reconnaissance flights and the arrival of reinforcements. By 19:00, all thirteen guerrillas had been killed. Their bodies were later transported in Unimog trucks to be shown to the press.

== Aftermath ==
The Mountain Company held a meeting between 15 and 16 October in which demobilization and retreat towards the cities of Córdoba and Buenos Aires was decided. Author Juan Bautista Yofre claims that this action marked the ERP rural front's "near definitive" defeat.

== See also ==
- People's Revolutionary Army (Argentina)
- Montoneros
- Operation Primicia
- Guerrilla warfare

== Bibliography ==
- Larraquy, Marcelo (2013). Los 70. Una historia violenta (Marcados a fuego III, 1973-1983). Aguilar. ISBN 978-9-870-428-527.
- Yofre, Juan Bautista (2006). Nadie fue: crónica, documentos y testimonios de los últimos meses, los últimos días, las últimas horas de Isabel Perón en el poder. Editorial De Bolsillo. ISBN 950072930X. OCLC 255636095.
