= San Patricio Church massacre =

1976 mass murder in Buenos Aires, Argentina

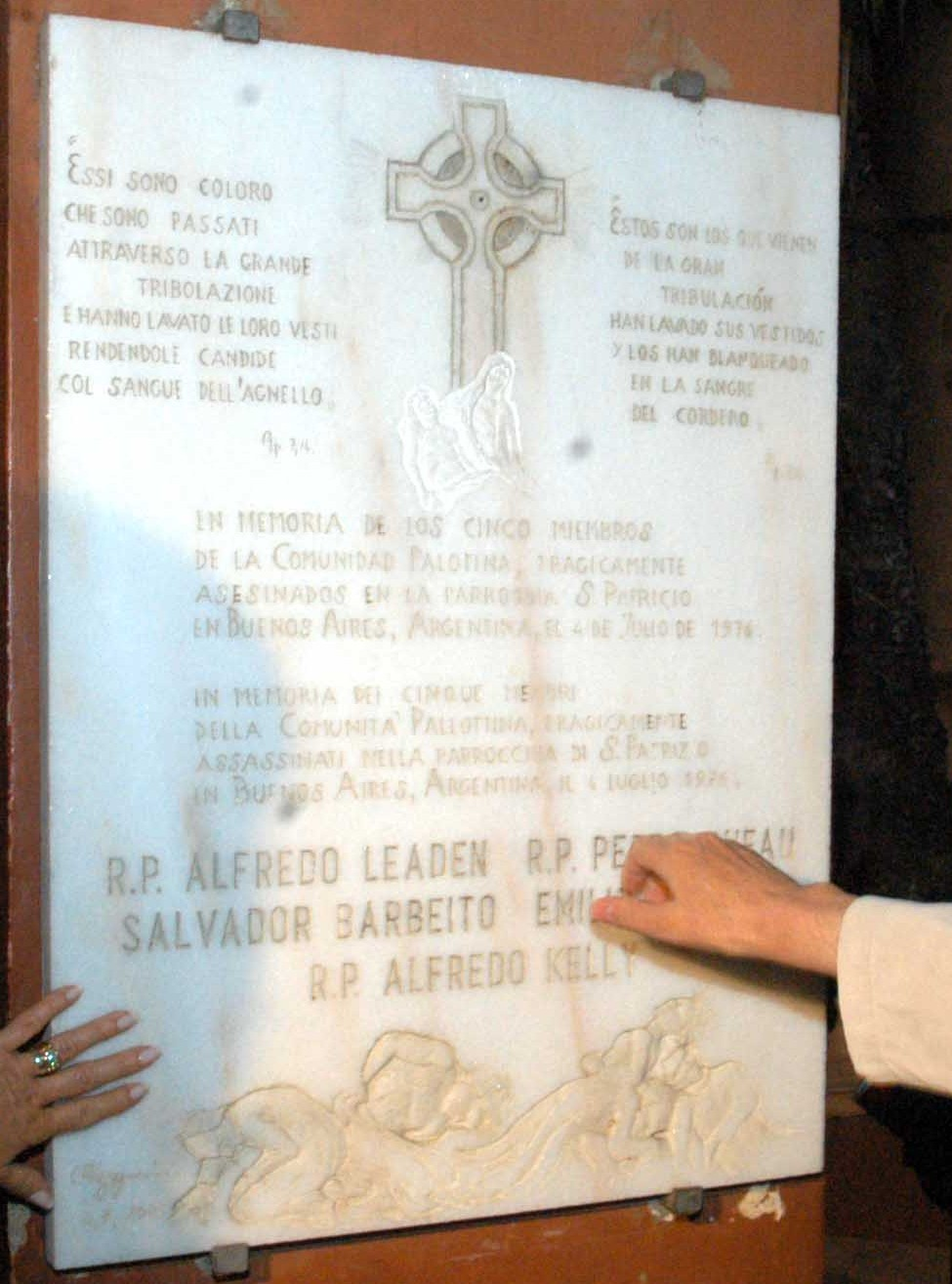
Plaque in memory of the Pallottine Fathers in the Church of St. Sylvester in Rome.

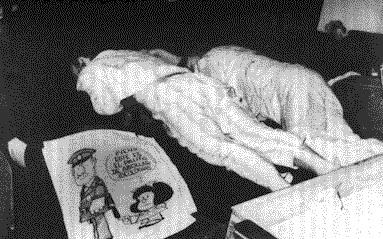
Forensic photo of the bodies of the Pallottine Fathers.

The San Patricio Church massacre was the mass murder of three priests and two seminarians of the Pallottine order on July 4, 1976, during the Dictadura Cívico Militar Argentina, at St. Patrick's Church, located in the Belgrano neighborhood of the Buenos Aires, Argentina. The victims were priests Alfredo Leaden, Alfredo Kelly, and Pedro Duffau and seminarians Salvador Barbeito and Emilio Barletti. The murders were ordered by Argentine Navy Rear Admiral Ruben Chamorro.

== The crime ==
At approximately 1:00 a.m. on Sunday July 4, 1976, three youths, Luis Pinasco, Guillermo Silva, and Julio Víctor Martínez, watched as two cars parked in front of the church of San Patricio. As the son of a soldier, Martínez thought it might be part of an assassination attempt on his father, so he went to Police Station No. 37 to make a report. Minutes later, a police car arrived on the scene and officer Miguel Ángel Romano spoke with people who were suspects in the case. At 2:00am Silva and Pinasco saw a group of people with rifles getting out of the cars and moving into the church. Later in the morning, at the time of the first Mass, a group of worshippers waiting in front of the church found the door closed.

Surprised by the situation, Fernando Savino, an organist from the parish, decided to enter through a window and found on the first floor the bodies of the five religious riddled with bullets, and lined-up face down in a pool of blood on a red carpet. The murderers had written with chalk on a door:

Por los camaradas dinamitados en Seguridad Federal. Venceremos. Viva la Patria.
(For the comrades blown up at Federal Security. We will prevail. Long live the Fatherland.)

They also wrote on a carpet:

Estos zurdos murieron por ser adoctrinadores de mentes vírgenes y son M.S.T.M.
(These lefties were killed for being indoctrinators of innocent minds and are [part of the] M.S.T.M.)

The initials "M.S.T.M." stand for Movimiento de Sacerdotes para el Tercer Mundo (the Movement of Priests for the Third World), while the first sentence about "Federal Security" refers to a bomb attack perpetrated by Montoneros (whose motto was "Venceremos" ) two days prior in the dining room of the Argentine Federal Police headquarters, killing 23 people.

On the body of Salvador Barbeito the murderers placed a cartoon by Quino, taken from one of the rooms, in which Mafalda appears pointing to a policeman's baton saying: «Este es el palito de abollar ideologías» ("This is the ideology-denting stick").

The following day, the newspaper La Nación published a story about the slaughter which included the text of a communiqué from Area Command I of the Army that read:

Elementos subversivos asesinaron cobardemente a los sacerdotes y seminaristas. El vandálico hecho fue cometido en dependencias de la iglesia San Patricio, lo cual demuestra que sus autores, además de no tener Patria, tampoco tienen Dios.
(Subversive [leftist] agents have cowardly murdered the priests and seminarians. The barbaric incident was committed on the premises of St. Patrick's Church, which shows that the perpetrators are unpatriotic and godless.)

Testimony before the CONADEP Commission in 1984 indicated that the San Patricio Church murders were carried out by members of the Argentine Navy on the orders of Rear Admiral Ruben Chamorro, head of Navy Petty-Officers School of Mechanics (ESMA).

== Cause for beatification ==
The superior general of the Pallottine fathers in Argentina, Bishop Seamus Freeman, sought out Fr. Jorge Bergoglio for support in the campaign for beatification for those killed in the attack.

In 2005, Cardinal Bergoglio, who subsequently became Pope Francis, authorised the request for beatification.

== See also ==
- List of massacres in Argentina
