= Revolutionary Coordinating Junta =

Political and military organization in South America

The Revolutionary Coordinating Junta or JCR (Junta Coordinadora Revolucionaria or Junta de Coordinación Revolucionaria) was an alliance of leftist South American guerrilla organizations in the mid-1970s. The JCR was composed of the Chilean Revolutionary Left Movement (MIR), the Argentine People's Revolutionary Army (ERP), the Uruguayan Tupamaros, and the Bolivian National Liberation Army (ELN).

The alliance was targeted by Pinochet's Operation Condor in 1975. In 1976, JCR established a counterintelligence unit run by the MIR and based in Stockholm, to monitor Operation Condor activities in Northern Europe. The JCR alliance was supported and organized by the government of Cuba, which also provided training, weapons, and shelter to the guerrillas.

== Member organizations ==
Name	Country	Join Date
People's Revolutionary Army	Argentina	August 1973
Revolutionary Left Movement	Chile	August 1973
Tupamaros National Liberation Movement	Uruguay	August 1973
National Liberation Army	Bolivia	August 1973
