= Operation Gardel =

1975 plane bombing in Argentina

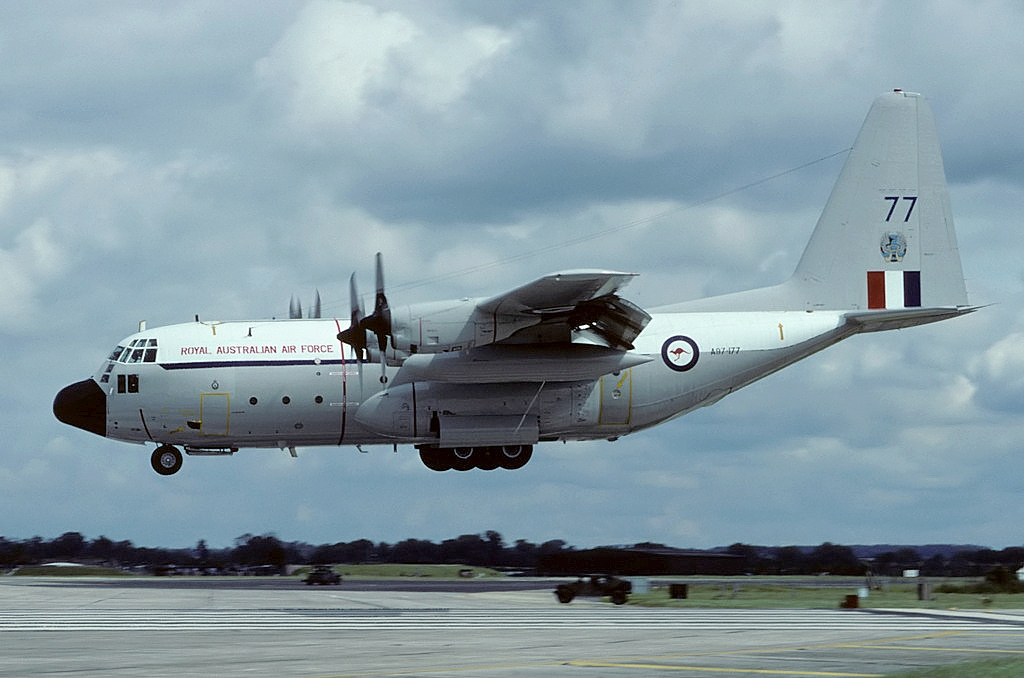
- An C-130 similar to the one involved

Shootdown
- Date: 28 August 1975
- Summary: Plane crashed after bomb placed in a sewage drain under the runway detonated during take-off.
- Site: San Miguel de Tucumán, Tucumán, Argentina

Aircraft
- Aircraft type: Military transport aircraft
- Aircraft name: Lockheed C-130 Hercules
- Operator: Argentine Air Force
- Registration: TC-62
- Flight origin: El Palomar Air Base
- 1st stopover: Old Teniente General Benjamín Matienzo International Airport
- 2nd stopover: Domingo Faustino Sarmiento Airport
- 3rd stopover: Capitán Vicente Almandos Almonacid Airport
- Destination: El Palomar Air Base
- Occupants: 114
- Passengers: 107
- Crew: 7
- Fatalities: 6
- Injuries: 29
- Survivors: 108

Operation Gardel (Note: According to the September edition of Evita Montonera, Montoneros' clandestine magazine, the name stemmed from the similarity between this action and the accident in which Tango singer Carlos Gardel had died in 1935.) was the codename given by the Peronist guerrilla organization Montoneros to the downing of a Lockheed C-130 Hercules, belonging to the 1st Air Brigade's 1st Transport Group as it took off from the old Teniente Benjamín Matienzo International Airport, carrying 114 Gendarmerie personnel as part of a military intervention in Tucumán province.

== Background ==
The plan was to set off an explosive charge in the form of a conical tip placed below the runway when the C-130 was to be at full throttle during takeoff.

Near the middle of the runway some 1,100 meters away from the northern end and 1,000 from the southern, a disused sewer led to a storm drain. A cable was laid through the 250-meter tunnel, emerging from the storm drain and connecting the charge to the 12V battery of a parked vehicle. The switch would be activated from a nearby pit.

This "masterpiece of military engineering", referred to as such by Montoneros, had taken at least six months of planning; the fork of a branch was used as a benchmark to calculate the plane's trajectory.

== The downing ==
TC-62 took off from El Palomar Air Base at 09:00, carrying 85 members of the Argentine Federal Police, and landed at the Benjamin Matienzo International Airport at 11:56. The plane immediately started refueling, and 114 members of the National Gendarmerie embarked on the way home for their leave. The trip to San Juan was to be the second leg of the four-flight day's schedule.

Shortly after 13:00, the C-130 began taxiing and reached a speed of 200 km/h after traveling 800 meters. The explosion took place between 100 and 150 meters in front of the aircraft and two seconds away in time, leaving a 12-meter wide and 2-meter deep crater. The plane was between 12 and 15 meters above the ground at the time of the blast when it caught fire, leaned on its right side and crashed 400 meters further down the runway.

Five gendarmes were killed and 29 wounded in the explosion and subsequent fire, including six of the seven crew members. However, one who was unhurt set out to rescue those who were still trapped. He died later from asphyxiation after repeatedly entering the burning aircraft.

== See also ==
- Montoneros
- People's Revolutionary Army
