= Revolutionary and Popular Indoamericano Front =

The Revolutionary and Popular Indoamericano Front (in Spanish: Frente Indoamericano Revolucionario y Popular, FRIP) was a political movement in Argentina, founded by Francisco René Santucho in 1958 at Santiago del Estero, Argentina. It was a nationalist, indigenist and revolutionary movement, inspired in part by the ideas of the Peruvian Víctor Raúl Haya de la Torre. It was an antecedent of the Workers' Revolutionary Party.

== See also ==
- Víctor Raúl Haya de la Torre
- Workers' Revolutionary Party
- People's Revolutionary Army (Argentina)
