= Mario Roberto Santucho =

Argentine revolutionary (1936–1976)

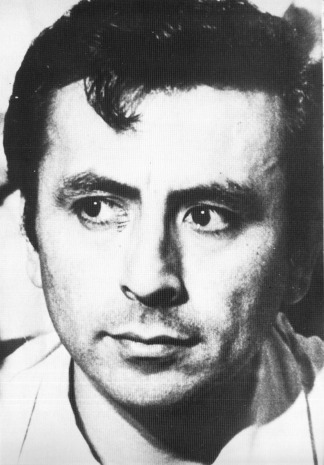
- Born: Mario Roberto Agustín Santucho; 12 August 1936; Santiago del Estero, Argentina
- Died: 19 July 1976 (aged 40); Villa Martelli, Argentina
- Cause of death: Ballistic trauma
- Occupations: Revolutionary and guerilla combatant
- Known for: Leader of a Marxist guerilla group

Mario Roberto Agustín Santucho (12 August 1936 – 19 July 1976) was an Argentine political militant, founder of the Partido Revolucionario de los Trabajadores (Workers' Revolutionary Party, PRT) and leader of Argentina's largest Marxist guerrilla group, the Ejército Revolucionario del Pueblo (People's Revolutionary Army, ERP).

Santucho was killed by the Argentine Armed Forces in a shootout in Villa Martelli (Buenos Aires Province) on 19 July 1976.

== Background ==
Santucho developed an early interest in politics. His brother Amílcar belonged to the Communist Party, while elder brother Francisco René, a writer and scholar of indigenous languages, was kidnapped and disappeared during Isabel Perón's rule in connection with his involvement with the ERP organization.

Santucho became involved in politics during his student years at the National University of Tucumán. He received a degree in Accounting and served as a delegate in student government.

In 1961 he married Ana María Villarreal and together they had three daughters: Ana, Marcela Eva, and Gabriela. During the same period he travelled throughout Latin America with Cuba as his final destination. While in Peru, he became familiar with Víctor Raúl Haya de la Torre and drew intellectual inspiration from the founder of the Alianza Popular Revolucionaria Americana (American Popular Revolutionary Alliance, APRA). Later, he would participate in debates and conferences at universities throughout the United States.

Santucho was one of the driving forces behind the Junta Coordinadora Revolucionaria (Revolutionary Coordinating Junta), a regional organization composed of Argentina's PRT, Bolivia's Ñancahuazú Guerrilla organization, Chile's Revolutionary Left Movement, and Uruguay's Tupamaros group.

Comrades often referred to Santucho by his nickname "Roby," although he was known to use other noms de guerre: Miguel, Comandante Carlos Ramírez, and Enrique Orozco, among others.

== Founding of PRT and ERP ==
Santucho was instrumental in early efforts to unite the Frente Revolucionario Indoamericano (FRIP), of which he was then leader, with the Trotskyite organization Palabra Obrera. The group that emerged from their unification on 25 May 1965, the Marxist–Leninist organization known as the Workers’ Revolutionary Party, would combine the indigenous struggles of the former with the class-based politics of the latter to form one of Latin America's most important communist parties.

On Santucho's initiative, and following shortly after the popular upheaval of 1969 known as "the Cordobazo", the Fifth Congress of the PRT voted in 1970 in favor of the formation of the People's Revolutionary Army (ERP). Although never officially recognized as the armed wing of the party, ERP contained among its members a large group of PRT militants and, more importantly, a number of armed combatants from diverse political and social backgrounds. Like the PRT, the organization's political platform was essentially anti-imperialist and anti-capitalist, with the socialist program of the PRT front-and-center.

At the organizational level, the PRT would function as the political and military command center of the armed faction of ERP, with Santucho acting as secretary general of the former and commanding officer of the latter. ERP would become during the 1970s the largest guerrilla organization in South America, and a prime example in Argentina of the "foquismo" tactic associated with Che Guevara.

Santucho was arrested in August 1971 in the Argentine city of Cordoba and transferred to the Villa Devoto Prison in Buenos Aires. During his time in prison he would enter in contact with members of the Communist Party, the Montoneros, the Fuerzas Armadas Revolucionarias (FAR) and the Fuerzas Armadas Peronistas. On 15 August 1972, he successfully escaped the Rawson maximum-security detention center and fled to Chile along with several members of FAR and the Montoneros. The escape operation involved, among other dramatic events, the seizure and redirection of a commercial airline flight. Shortly thereafter, the Argentine Armed Forces murdered his wife Ana María Villareal along with 15 other militants in the events later known as the "Trelew Massacre". In Chile, Santucho and his companions were granted safe passage by then president Salvador Allende to continue onwards to La Habana, Cuba.

Santucho returned to Argentina in November 1972 in order to resume his position as leader of PRT-ERP.

Santucho would later resist pressures to abandon the armed struggle and enter into dialogue with President Héctor Jóse Cámpora, the Peronist figurehead for then-exiled Juan Domingo Perón. In a series of public statements he denounced the counterrevolutionary character of the Campora government, as well as Perón's conciliatory attitude towards the Argentine business class and far right.

== Death ==
Roberto Santucho and a significant part of the PRT leadership were killed on 19 July 1976, as part of a covert ambush carried out by a paramilitary task force connected to the Argentine Armed Forces. Captain Juan Carlos Leonetti, who led the covert operation, was also killed in the course of action. A list of names detailing 395 members of the Juventud Guevarista group and Commanding Officers of ERP was discovered in one of Santucho's suitcases, along with a set of plans indicating the group's intentions to carry out an attack during the 1978 World Cup (held in Argentina). All 395 members were killed between 1976 and 1977.

Liliana Delfino, then wife of Santucho, was also captured during the operation and remains among the "disappeared" victims of the dictatorship whose body was never recovered.

According to surviving member and later secretary general of PRT-ERP Arnol Kremer (pseudonym Luis Mattini), the ERP and Montoneros leadership were coordinating efforts to build a unified guerrilla force shortly before Santucho's death. He also stated that the Montoneros were in the advanced planning stages to facilitate Santucho's departure for La Habana and that Santucho was, in fact, moments away from leaving when the attack in Villa Martelli occurred.

In a 2012 interview with Jorge Rafael Videla, the former military dictator stated that Santucho's body disappeared due to the military junta because “his was a figure that created a sense of hope. The appearance of his body would lead to homage and celebration. It was necessary to erase any trace of him.”

== Political theory ==
Santucho drew from a broad base of political thought. Among the intellectuals that informed his writings and thought were Lenin, Stalin and Trotsky, Milcíades Peña (an Argentine leftist intellectual from the 1960s), Miguel Ángel Asturias, Rodolfo Kuhn and Hector P. Agosti (an influential communist intellectual, responsible for introducing Gramsci to Argentina) . The Cuban Revolution and Che Guevara also played an important role in his intellectual formation.

Santucho was a vocal opponent of popular front politics. He believed that the national bourgeois was incapable of playing a significant role in bringing about political change, and that the contemporary slogan "Democracy or Dictatorship" common to many liberal sectors belied a common bourgeois interest in maintaining the status quo.

Santucho advanced the influential thesis that the Argentine Armed Forces represented a semi-autonomous political class. Regarding Peronism, Santucho considered the phenomenon a prime example of "Bonapartism", wherein a strongman figure mediates between competing class interests for the purpose of guaranteeing "national unity". These opinions put him at odds with leftists factions of the Peronist movement, who regarded Perón as an agent of revolutionary change, as well as the Communist Party, which had maintained since Peron's ascent to power in 1945 that Peronism was a local expression of fascism. In that sense, Santucho was equally opposed to a populist movement such as the Montonero's as he was to the gradualist platform of the Communist Party, advocating instead for a socialist revolution as the only viable option for national liberation.
