= Oberdan Sallustro =

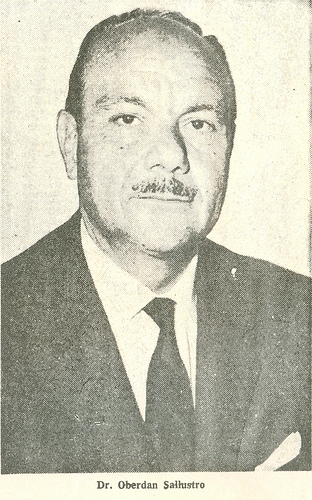
- Born: 1915; Asunción, Paraguay
- Died: 10 April 1972 (aged 56–57); Buenos Aires, Argentina
- Cause of death: Ballistic trauma
- Body discovered: 10 April 1972
- Occupation: Entrepreneur
- Known for: Assassination victim
- Spouse: Ida Burgstaller
- Children: 4
- Parents: Gaetano Sallustro (father); Anna D'Amato (mother)

Oberdan Sallustro (1915 – 10 April 1972) was a Paraguayan entrepreneur who served as Director General of FIAT Concord in Argentina. He was kidnapped and killed in 1972 by the Ejército Revolucionario del Pueblo (ERP) guerrilla group, according to newspaper reports.

== Kidnapping and murder ==
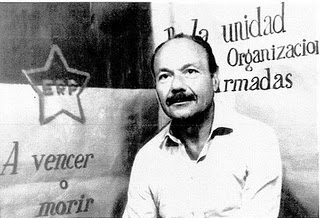
Oberdan Sallustro in the hands of the ERP, before his death by the ERP.

Oberdan Sallustro was kidnapped on 21 March 1972, by a six-man, one-woman commando unit of the ERP. The guerrillas shot and killed him on 10 April 1972, after the place where they had hidden him was discovered. Both the kidnapping and the murder caused an enormous impact both within Argentina and internationally.

== Oberdan Sallustro in culture ==
In popular culture, the Fiat 133, Fiat 673, and Fiat 130 AU (bus) were nicknamed "Sallustro" or "Vendetta de Sallustro". As it is understood, it is because they did not come out with the expected quality, in a kind of "rematch" for the violent death of Oberdan Sallustro.

A few years after Sallustro's assassination, Fiat Argentina paid homage to him by naming its new development, the Fiat 673 truck, with his name. This truck had severe deficiencies in its engine, (a version of the OM CP3) which mainly tended to overheat. Quickly, Argentine truck drivers and mechanics baptized it "Sallustro's Revenge". Since then, any Fiat or IVECO model that presents a problem or mechanical defect is nicknamed that way.

== Awards ==
- In 1967, Sallustro was unanimously awarded the Gold Medal of the Italian Institute for International Relations.
- In 1968, he was decorated by Pope Paul VI with the Pontifical Order of Saint Gregory the Great.

== Works ==
Conflicts of citizenship and dual citizenship, Dante Alighieri Association, Buenos Aires, 1960.

== See also ==
- List of kidnappings
- List of solved missing person cases

== Books ==
- Carnovale, Vera (2007). The executions of the PRT–ERP. Armed struggle in Argentina. year 3 (8): 4.
- History of Peronism. The violence (1956–1983) pp. 243–244. Buenos Aires. Javier VergaraEditor. 2008. ISBB 978-950-15-2433-8.
