= 2001 Floresta massacre =

Massacres in Argentina

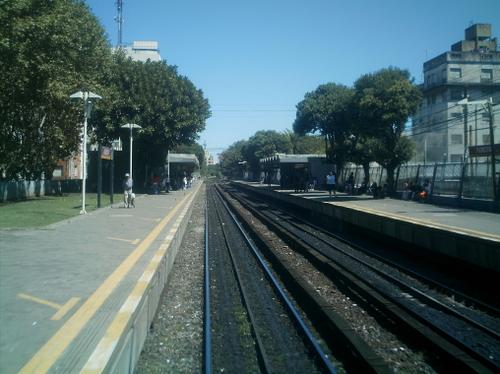
- Railway station at Floresta
- Location: Floresta, Buenos Aires, Argentina
- Date: December 29, 2001
- Attack type: Mass shooting, Murder
- Weapons: Browning Hi-Power, 9×19mm Parabellum
- Deaths: 3
- Perpetrator: Juan de Dios Velaztiqui
- Motive: He was annoyed by a comment he heard from one of the young men.

On December 29, 2001, a police officer, Juan De Dios Velaztiqui, shot and killed three young men at point-blank range inside a convenience store at a gas station in the Floresta neighborhood of Buenos Aires, Argentina, angered by their comments against the police.

== Shooting ==
In the early morning of Saturday, December 29, 2001, four friends, Cristian Gómez, Maximiliano Tasca, Adrián Matassa and Enrique Díaz, were sitting at a table in a convenience store watching television, which was showing the riots of the previous night, days after Fernando de la Rúa's stepping down from the presidency and hours before his successor Adolfo Rodríguez Saá's resignation.

When the television showed protesters beating a police officer, Tasca commented: "At last, justice for the 33!", in reference to the recent deaths during the repression of the 19 December riots. Upon hearing this, retired non-commissioned officer Juan de Dios Velaztiqui—who was guarding the place—responded, "Enough!" drew his weapon, opened fire, and killed Tasca, Gómez, and Matassa. Enrique Díaz survived because he managed to run. They were all between 23 and 25 years old.

Velaztiqui tried to stage a robbery scene, moving the bodies and planting a knife, but it wasn't convincing and he was arrested.

The incident sparked a popular rebellion among the residents of Floresta, who went to the police station to demand justice, and were repressed with tear gas and rubber bullets. Neighbors lit barricades and a full-blown battle broke out in the neighborhood. The Buenos Aires criminal court seized three million pesos from Velaztiqui, convertible to dollars at that time.

== Investigation and trial ==
During the investigation, it was learned that the federal police officer—a resident of Plátanos (Buenos Aires)—in Berazategui – had been part of the illegal repression of the 1970s.

In March 2003, an oral court sentenced the police officer to life imprisonment for "triple homicide aggravated by treachery."

== Aftermath ==
In the Plaza Ciudad de Udine and the Plaza del Corralón there are murals with the faces of the three young men surrounded by shields and the colors of the All Boys Athletic Club, due to the passion that Cristian Gómez felt for the team. Maximiliano Tasca and Adrián Matassa's sympathy for this team.

The episode inspired the band No Te Va Gustar to write their song "El oficial".

There is a documentary that reflects on police violence, using this case as its central theme. Executed in Floresta, directed by Diego Ceballos, premiered on December 7, 2006.
