= Ricardo Barreda =

Argentine family killer

Ricardo Alberto Barreda (16 June 1936 – 24 November 2020) was an Argentine dentist who was sentenced to life imprisonment for the murders of his wife, Gladys McDonald, his two daughters, Cecilia and Adriana Barreda, and his mother-in-law, Elena Arreche, on 15 November 1992. He was granted parole on 29 March 2011. Barreda died nine years later at a care home with Alzheimer's disease from a cardiac arrest.
