= Corduente =

Corduente, Spain
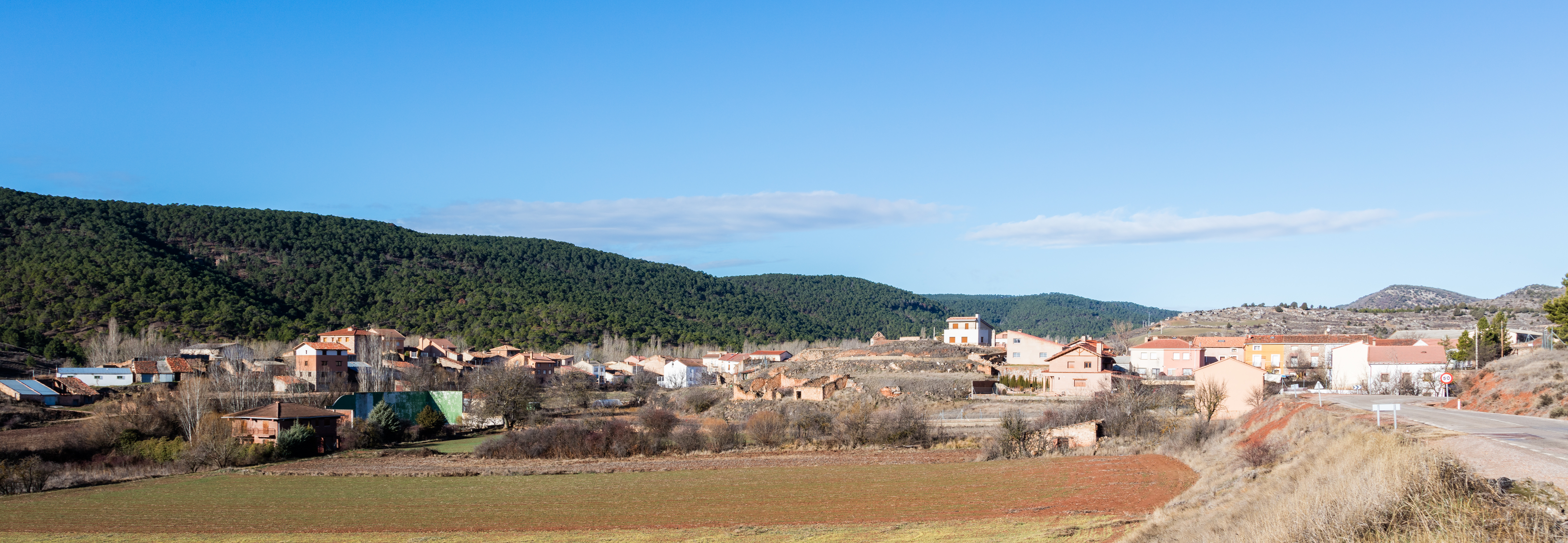

- Flag Coat of arms

- Location within Province of Guadalajara Location within Castilla-La Mancha Location within Spain
- Coordinates: 40°50′40″N 1°58′39″W
- Country: Spain
- Autonomous community: Castile-La Mancha
- Province: Guadalajara
- Municipality: Corduente

Area
  - Total: 232 km^{2} (90 sq mi)

Population (2025-01-01)
  - Total: 297
  - Density: 1.28/km^{2} (3.32/sq mi)
- Time zone: UTC+1 (CET)
  - Summer (DST): UTC+2 (CEST)

Corduente is a municipality located in the province of Guadalajara, Castile-La Mancha, Spain. According to the 2004 census (INE), the municipality has a population of 430 inhabitants.
