= Abraham Guillén =

Spanish author, economist and educator

- Born: Abraham Guillén Sanz; 13 March 1913; Corduente, Guadalajara, Spain
- Died: 1 August 1993 (aged 80); Madrid, Spain
- Known for: Theory of urban guerrilla warfare

Abraham Guillén Sanz (13 March 1913 – 1 August 1993), was a Spanish author, economist, and political theorist. He was a veteran of the Spanish Civil War, influenced by anarchism, and developed a theory of urban guerrilla warfare that was taken up by the Tupamaros in Uruguay.

== Biography ==
Abraham Guillén Sanz was born into a family of peasants on 13 March 1913, in the Castilian village of Corduente.

Guillén became a neo-Marxist, synthesising Karl Marx's economic theory with the direct action advocated by Mikhail Bakunin. He never joined a political party, as he believed that neither the Spanish Socialist Workers' Party (PSOE) nor the Communist Party of Spain (PCE) were truly Marxist organisations, instead labelling them as "opportunists". He instead joined the anarcho-syndicalist National Confederation of Labour (CNT), which he believed to be the only Spanish trade union federation that engaged in class struggle, and criticised Spanish Trotskyists for not joining it as well. Guillén was particularly inspired by the anarchist philosophy of Buenaventura Durruti, who valued collective action and retaliatory violence against business owners.

At the outbreak of the Spanish Civil War, he participated in the suppression of the Nationalist coup in Madrid. He then joined up with the confederal militias, within which he fought in the Battle of Guadarrama and defended the capital during the siege of Madrid. He later joined the Spanish Republican Army and fought in the battles of Jarama, Guadalajara and Brunete, first as political commissar of the 14th Division then later as commissar of the IV Army Corps. With the end of the war, Guillén was captured by the Nationalists and sentenced to death, although his sentence would later be commuted to 10 years imprisonment. In 1941, he unsuccessfully attempted to escape from prison in Añover de Tajo. He was successful on his second attempt in 1945, breaking out of Carabanchel Prison and fleeing into exile in France.

Three years later, he emigrated to Argentina and contributed to a periodical published by the Ministry of Economy under a pseudonym ("Jaime de las Heras"). His economic writings gained widespread attention, with the United States embassy inquiring to Juan Perón's government about his identity. Under a different pseudonym ("Fernando Molina"), he contributed political commentary to the newspaper El Laborista. He criticised Raúl Prebisch's plan to devalue the Argentine peso, predicting it would result in capital flight, inflation and even an economic depression. In 1957, he published The Agony of Imperialism, for which he was dismissed from his job and blacklisted as a journalist. Three years later, he was hired as an economic adviser by the Argentine Senate, but was fired after he advised they vote against proposals to relax controls on foreign capital.

In 1961, he was arrested and imprisoned over his affiliation with the Uturuncos, a Peronist guerrilla group, for whom he had worked as a military adviser. After his release, he fled to Uruguay, where he contacted local guerrilla groups; in contrast with the Fidelistas, who assumed the rural geography of Uruguay made it unsuitable for guerrilla warfare, Guillén developed a strategy for urban guerrilla warfare. In 1966, he published Strategy of the Urban Guerrilla, which provided an organisational model for a new Uruguayan guerrilla group: the National Liberation Movement – Tupamaros. He also authored an introduction to Che Guevara's book on Guerrilla Warfare, but the two diverged sharply from each other over the efficacy of urban guerrilla warfare.

In January 1967, the Uruguayan authorities attempted to expose Guillén's background as a Spanish anarchist. The following month, he was arrested on suspicion of being the leader of the Tupamaros, but he was acquitted. He was arrested again the following year, on charges of instructing the Tupamaros in guerrilla warfare, but again was released due to lack of evidence.

During the 1970s, he wrote a series of critiques of the Soviet Union's authoritarian socialism, instead expressing support for Yugoslavia's system of socialist self-management. After the Spanish transition to democracy, he finally returned to Spain, where he died in 1993.

== Works ==
In Spanish

- El imperio del dolar: América Latina: Revolución o alienación (Buenos Aires, 1962)
- Teoria de la violencia; guerra y lucha de clases (Buenos Aires, 1965)
- Estrategia de la guerrilla urbana (Ediciones Liberación, 1969)
- Desafío al Pentagono; la guerrilla latinoamericana (Montevideo, 1969)
- El Capitalismo Soviético: Última etapa del Imperialismo (Queimada Ediciones, 1979)
- El error militar de las izquierdas (Barcelona, 1980)
- Economía libertaria (Fundación Anselmo Lorenzo, 1988)
- Técnica de la desinformación (Fundación Anselmo Lorenzo, 1991)

English translations

- Philosophy of the Urban Guerrilla. The revolutionary writings of Abraham Guillén (New York, 1973)

== See also ==
- Anarchism in Argentina
- Anarchism in Uruguay

== Bibliography ==
- Hodges, Thomas C., ed. (1973). Philosophy of the Urban Guerrilla: The Revolutionary Writings of Abraham Guillén. William Morrow and Company. ISBN 0-688-05147-2.
- Lawson, Tommy (2020). "Abraham Guillén, Between Bakunin and Marx: Anarchism, Socialism, and the Economics of Self-Management". Libcom.org.
- Nemmers, John R. (2004). "A Guide to the Abraham Guillen Collection". George A. Smathers Libraries. University of Florida.
- Roldan-Figueroa, Rady (2009). "Guillén, Abraham (1913–1993)". In Ness, Immanuel (ed.). The International Encyclopedia of Revolution and Protest. pp. 1491–1942. doi:10.1002/9781405198073.wbierp0663. ISBN 978-1-4051-8464-9.
