= Acheral =

Coordinates: 27°07′S 65°27′W

- Country: Argentina
- Province: Tucumán Province

Government
  - Commissioner: Victor Hugo Cardozo

Population (2001)
  - Total: 3,913
- Postal code: 4134
- Area code: 03863
- Climate: Cfa

Acheral is a settlement in Tucumán Province in the Monteros Department in northern Argentina in proximity to the Pre-Cordilleras of the Andes. It is accessed from the provincial capital city by Ruta Nacional 38 to the south.

It is a rural community with 7,000 inhabitants.

== History ==
On 30 May 1974 the Ramón Rosa Jiménez Company of the People's Revolutionary Army successfully "invaded" the village of Acheral and raised the first ERP flag.

On 10 October 1975, a skirmish between ERP guerrillas and the Argentine Army took place in Arroyo San Gabriel, 2 km north of Acheral. Army Aviation helicopters strafed the guerrillas' hideout and used their air-to-surface rockets to set it on fire, resulting in the deaths of one soldier and 13 guerrillas. One army helicopter was damaged during the incident.

== In popular culture ==
Acheral is referenced in the song "A Don Ata", which mentions "campos de Acheral" in its lyrics.
