= Walter De Giusti =

Argentine serial killer

- Mug shot
- Born: Walter De Giusti; 1962; Rosario, Argentina
- Died: May 27, 1998 (aged 35–36); Rosario, Argentina
- Conviction: Murder
- Penalty: Life imprisonment

Details
- Victims: 5
- Span of crimes: October 31, 1986 – November 7, 1986
- Country: Argentina
- State: Santa Fe Province
- Date apprehended: August 26, 1987

Walter Alfredo De Giusti (1962 in Rosario – May 27, 1998) was an Argentine spree killer who was known for murdering musician Fito Páez's grandmothers, as well as three other women.

== Biography ==
=== Youth ===
De Giusti studied at Dante Alighieri high school in Rosario, where he met Páez. At that time De Giusti played bass in a heavy metal band, while Páez studied piano and lived with his father and grandmothers, who acted as mothers, since the mother of Páez - the concert pianist Margarita Zulema Ávalos - died when he was eight months old.

=== First murder ===
De Giusti's killings began on October 31, 1986, when the then 23-year old Walter and 18-year-old brother Carlos Manuel De Giusti, entered a house on Garay Street 1081 in the city of Rosario while carrying out plumbing tasks. There he beat and stabbed two women: Ángela Cristofanetti de Barroso (aged 86) and her adopted daughter Noemí (aged 31).

=== Fito Páez's grandmothers ===
A week later, at noon on November 7, 1986, on Balcarce Street 681 in the same city, the De Giusti brothers committed another brutal crime. Belia Delia Zulema Ramírez, widow of Páez, 76-years old (paternal grandmother of Fito), Josefa Páez, 80-years old (paternal aunt of Fito) and Fermina Godoy, 33-years old (domestic worker for the Páez family, who was also pregnant) were shot and stabbed. It is believed that De Giusti - 24 years old at the time - knew and frequented the home of the victims.

=== Joining the police ===
One month later, on December 4, 1986, De Giusti became a police officer for the sub-office of Pueblo Esther, located 15 kilometres south of Rosario.

=== Investigation ===
It took the Rosario police almost a year to decipher the crime. Finally, De Giusti was betrayed by a local transvestite, who wore a necklace that belonged to one of Páez's grandmothers and declared - with an undercover agent - that it was a gift from "her boyfriend Walter."

The next day, the police raided the house of the De Giusti family, who lived on Güemes Street 2130, a few blocks north of the Páez family. The first thing that was found upon entry was an engraver which Fito Páez had given to his grandmother Belia.

=== Trial ===
The justice charged De Giusti of quintuple murder as the sole perpetrator of the crimes. Before Judge Benjamín Ávalos, De Giusti confessed to the five killings. On August 24, 1987, Judge Ávalos sentenced him to life imprisonment in the Coronda prison in Santa Fe.

His brother, Carlos, who at the time was 19 years old, was detained under probation for his participation in the act. All this time was followed closely by the Rosario police since he was considered dangerous.

Once held in prison, De Giusti was taken to compulsory police retirement: he continued to receive 70 percent of his salary for six more years, until November 1993.

Nine years after his life imprisonment in May 1996, De Giusti's defence requested that his sentence be reduced to 25 years. Then, in August 1997, he requested a commutation and obtained a benefit that lowered his sentence 24 years and 7 months. Finally, and taking into account that he contracted HIV in prison, the defence requested that De Giusti serve the sentence in his home. After a medical examination, the coroners informed Judge Lura that the former policeman was practically blind. This was key to magistrate to arrange a house arrest.

=== Freedom and death ===
A year later in 1998, a neighbour of former judge Benjamín Ábalos (who had sentenced him in 1987, and was already retired), told him that De Giusti was walking through the streets of Rosario and was always going to a bar in the northwest corner of San Luis and Balcarce streets. Ábalos consulted with the owner of the bar. He inquired if De Giusti really was there, and owner told him that he came by every day. He even said that the condemned man boasted about his sentence. Also, although De Giusti was under house arrest for alleged blindness, several witnesses had seen him driving a yellow Fiat 600 car. When this irregularity was verified, Ábalos contacted Judge Lura and told him everything.

On May 19, 1998, the provincial government issued a decree exonerating De Giusti from the police and the prosecution was asked to force him to return all the wages he earned during the time he served in the force.

On Wednesday, May 27, 1998, at 5:45 pm, Lura was able to verify that De Giusti was not at his house, thus violating the house arrest.

On Wednesday, June 3, 1998, at 12:30 noon, by order of Judge Efraín Lura, De Giusti was admitted to the Rosario prison to properly serve his sentence. The magistrate on a report from the medical board which ruled that the former policeman was compensated and did not present foreseeable complications. But on Monday, June 8, De Giusti decompensated, so he was admitted to a hospital in Granadero Baigorria. On Wednesday, June 10, he was referred to the American Sanatorium in Rosario, where he died due to HIV/AIDS complications on Friday, June 12, 1998.

== See also ==
- Ciudad de pobres corazones (1987)
  - Ciudad de pobres corazones (canción) (1986)

== Bibliography ==
- Vargas, Horacio: Fito Páez: the biography (Life after life). Buenos Aires: Homo Sapiens, ISBN 950-808-044-2, 1994.

== Notes ==
- Brisaboa, Jorge: «Volvió a la cárcel el asesino de la abuela y la tía de Fito Páez», article from June 4, 1998, in the newspaper Clarín (Buenos Aires). Retrieved on January 17, 2015.
- Correspondent of Clarín: «El asesino de Rosario murió en un sanatorio», article from June 14, 1998, in the newspaper Clarín (Buenos Aires). Retrieved on January 17, 2015.
