= Carnaghi =

Carnaghi is an Italian surname. Notable people with the surname include:

- Guillermo Carnaghi (born 1952), Argentine politician
- Roberto Carnaghi (born 1938), Argentine actor
