= 2006 San Miguel shooting =

Mass shooting in San Miguel, Buenos Aires, Argentina

- Location in San Miguel (Greater Buenos Aires) Location in San Miguel (Argentina)
- Location: La Primera de Grand Bourg; San Miguel, Buenos Aires, Argentina
- Date: 3 May 2006; 20 years ago 10:00 a.m. (ART; UTC−03:00)
- Attack type: Mass shooting, workplace shooting, shooting spree
- Weapon: 9mm semi-automatic pistol
- Deaths: 2
- Injuries: 5 (4 by gunfire)
- Perpetrator: Eugenio Villela
- Motive: Economic problems

On 3 May 2006, a mass shooting occurred at a bus company in San Miguel, Buenos Aires, Argentina. Former employee, 55-year-old Eugenio Villela, opened fire on his past co-workers, killing two people and wounding four others before fleeing the scene. He later surrendered to authorities and was sentenced to 32 years in prison in 2009.

== Shooting ==
At 10:00 a.m. (UTC−03:00; ART) on 3 May 2006, Eugenio Villela drove to the La Primera de Grand Bourg bus company in his Ford Fiesta. He greeted his former co-workers on the ground floor before traveling to the first floor, where senior employees were meeting to discuss company issues. Villela entered the meeting room and opened fire on those inside with a 9mm pistol, firing thirteen shots. After the shooting, Villela fled the scene by foot and went to his brother-in-law's house, where he attacked and injured his brother-in-law. Villela then drove to the local police station and surrendered.

== Victims ==
Six people were shot in the attack; treasurer Pablo Galazzo died instantly, while accountant Isaac López died at a hospital from his injuries. Four other people were severely wounded and transported to hospital, where they recovered from their injuries.

== Perpetrator ==
The shooter was identified as 55-year-old Eugenio Villela, a former employee of La Primera de Grand Bourg who had served as a manager before selling his shares and leaving the company in December 2005. During his time with the business, his co-workers noted him to be an aggressive man who acted violently and yelled at people, but was sometimes depressed. Villela was allegedly owed AR$800,000 for selling eight buses after he left the company, but was told by his former colleagues that he would not receive the money. This was reportedly his motive for the shooting.

=== Legal proceedings ===
On 4 May, Villela was transported to court, having been charged with two counts of homicide, four counts of attempted homicide, and illegally carrying a weapon of war. He stated that he did not remember the attack and that he had intended to return the pistol used in the shooting to the company. Villela also said that he had no debt with the company. A psychiatric test was performed on the day of the shooting, as well as blood and urine samples, which determined that Villela was not intoxicated at the time of the attack.

In 2009, Villela underwent trial in the Oral Criminal Court 4 of San Martín. His defense argued that Villela was mentally ill at the time of the attack and could not comprehend his actions. Those wounded in the shooting testified that Villela had shot them, with then-treasurer José Laborde stating that Villela had threatened his colleagues when he left the company. A woman also testified that she saw Villela admit to the crime as he surrendered. Psychologists and psychiatrists testified that Villela had no mental disorders and understood what he did. On 25 March, Villela was found guilty on all charges and was sentenced to 32 years in prison. Prosecutors had sought 40 years' imprisonment, but the jury lessened Villela's sentence because of his lack of criminal activity prior to the attack.
