= Benito Urteaga =

Argentine revolutionary

Benito Jorge Urteaga
- Born: 1946; San Nicolás de los Arroyos
- Died: 19 July 1976; Villa Martelli
- Other names: Mariano

Benito Urteaga was a Marxist revolutionary and guerrilla from Argentina. He was born in 1946 and was killed on 19 July 1976. After Mario Roberto Santucho, he was the second most important person of ERP. He was killed together with Mario Roberto Santucho by military forces in Buenos Aires in 1976.
