= Guevarism =

Communist political and military theory

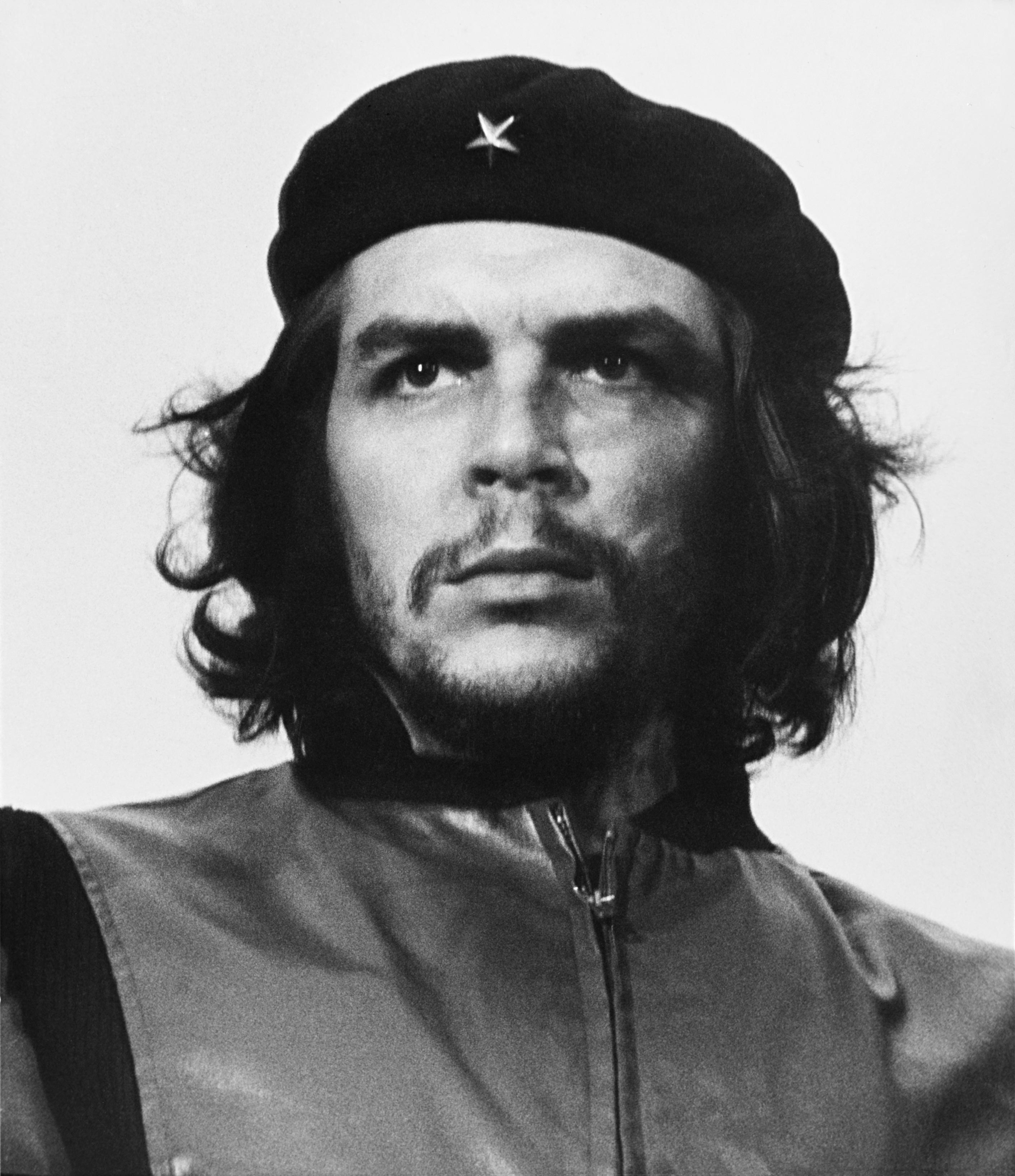
Che Guevara, after whom Guevarism is named.

Guevarism is a theory of communist revolution and a military strategy of guerrilla warfare associated with Argentine Marxist revolutionary Che Guevara, a leading figure of the Cuban Revolution who believed in the idea of Marxism–Leninism and embraced its principles.

== Overview ==
After the 1959 triumph of the Cuban Revolution led by a militant foco under Fidel Castro, his Argentine-born, internationalist and Marxist colleague, Guevara, parlayed his ideology and experiences into a model for emulation (and at times, direct military intervention) around the globe. While exporting one such "focalist" revolution to Bolivia, leading an armed vanguard party there in October 1967, Guevara was captured and executed, becoming a martyr to both the world communist movement and socialism in general.

His ideology promotes exporting revolution to any country whose leader is supported by the empire (United States) and has fallen out of favor with its citizens. Guevara talks about how constant guerrilla warfare taking place in non-urban areas can overcome leaders. He introduces three points that are representative of his ideology as a whole, namely that the people can win with proper organization against a nation's army; that the conditions that make a revolution possible can be put in place by the popular forces; and that the popular forces always have an advantage in a non-urban setting.

Guevara had a particularly keen interest in guerrilla warfare, with a dedication to foco techniques, also known as focalism (or foquismo in Spanish), which is vanguardism by small armed units, frequently in place of established communist parties, initially launching attacks from rural areas to mobilize unrest into a popular front against a sitting regime. Despite differences in approach—emphasizing guerrilla leadership and audacious raids that engender general uprising, rather than consolidating political power in military strongholds before expanding to new ones—Guevara took great inspiration from the Maoist notion of a "protracted people's war" and sympathized with Mao Zedong's People's Republic of China in the Sino-Soviet split. This controversy may partly explain his departure from Castro's pro-Soviet Cuba in the mid-1960s. Guevara also drew direct parallels with his contemporary communist comrades in the Viet Cong, exhorting a multi-front guerrilla strategy to create "two, three, many Vietnams".

In Guevara's final years, after leaving Cuba, he advised communist paramilitary movements in Africa and Latin America, including a young Laurent-Désiré Kabila, future ruler of Zaire, which is the Democratic Republic of the Congo today. Finally, while leading a small focalist band of guerrilla cadres in Bolivia, Guevara was captured and killed. His death and the short-term failure of his Guevarist tactics may have interrupted the component guerrilla wars within the larger Cold War for a time and even temporarily discouraged Soviet and Cuban sponsorship for focalism.

The emerging communist movements and other fellow traveler radicalism of the time either switched to urban guerrilla warfare before the end of the 1960s and/or soon revived the rural-based strategies of both Maoism and Guevarism, tendencies that escalated worldwide throughout the 1970s, by and large with the support from the communist states and the Soviet Union in general, as well as Castro's Cuba in particular.

Another proponent of Guevarism was the French intellectual Régis Debray, who could be seen as attempting to establish a coherent, unitary theoretical framework on these grounds. Debray has since broken with this.

== Details ==
Che Guevara developed a series of ideas and concepts that have become known as "Guevarism". His thinking took Marxism–Leninism and anti-imperialism as a basic element, adding reflections on how to carry out a revolution and create a socialist society, that gave it its own identity.

=== Guerrilla warfare ===
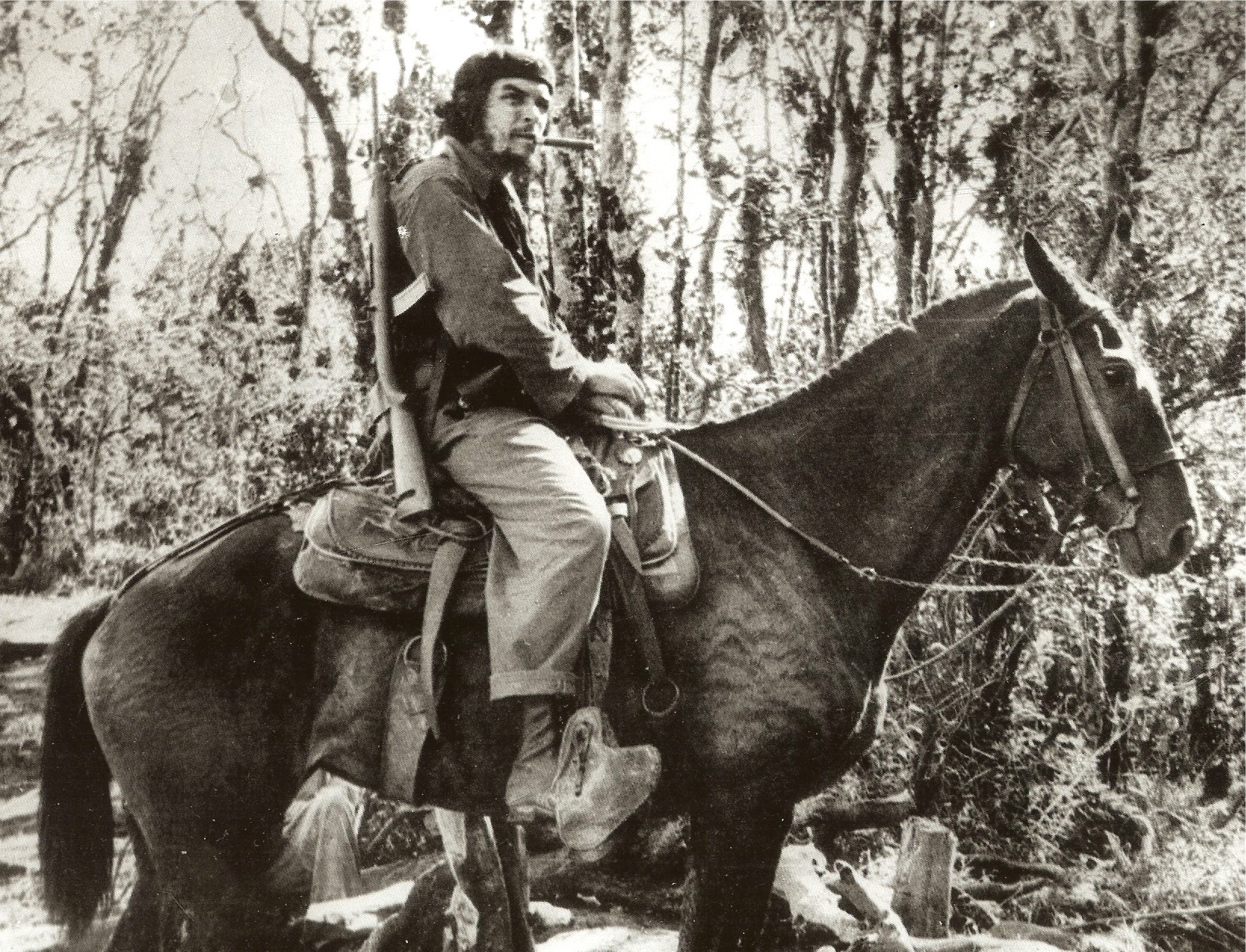
Guevara as an armed guerrilla during the Cuban Revolution (1958)

Che Guevara gave a fundamental role to the armed struggle. From his own experience, he developed a whole theory about guerrilla warfare which has been defined as foco. For him, when there were "objective conditions" for a revolution in a country, a small "focus" guerrilla as a vanguard could create the "subjective conditions" and unleash a general population uprising.

He argued that there was a close link between the guerrillas, the peasants and the land reform. This position differentiated his thinking from purely labor-industrial socialism and brought him closer to Maoist ideas.

His book Guerilla Warfare is a manual where tactics and strategies used in Cuban guerrilla warfare are discussed.

However, Che claimed that in certain contexts the armed struggle had no place, so it was necessary to use peaceful mechanisms such as participation within representative democracy. Although Che stated that this line should be peaceful but "very combative, very brave" and that it could only be abandoned if its orientation in favor of representative democracy was undermined within the population.

=== The new man ===
The fundamental axis on which he guided his political-theoretical-military action was the beginning of Marxist humanism. In other words, Che suggests that it is essential to distinguish between Marx's humanism and bourgeois humanism, traditional Christian, philanthropic, etc. Against all abstract humanism that claims to be "above class" (and which is, in the last analysis, bourgeois), Che's, like the liberation of the man of Marx's, is explicitly engaged in a proletarian class perspective. Thus radically opposing "bad humanism" he declares that: and the realization of their potentialities can only be realized by the revolution of the workers, peasants and other exploited classes that eliminates the exploitation of man by man and establishes rational domination and collective of men (proletarians) on their process of social life.

== Criticism ==
Guevarism has been criticized from a revolutionary anarchist perspective by Abraham Guillén, one of the leading tacticians of urban guerrilla warfare in Uruguay and Brazil. Guillen claimed that cities are a better ground for the guerrilla than the countryside (Guillen was a veteran of the Spanish Civil War). He criticized Guevarist movements of national liberation (like the Uruguayan Tupamaros, one of the many groups that he helped as a military advisor).

== See also ==
- Alberto Bayo
- Carlos Marighella
- July 26 Movement
- Urban guerrilla warfare
- Wars of national liberation
- Camilism
