= Fátima, Argentina =

Town in Buenos Aires Province, Argentina

Coordinates: 34°26′S 59°00′W

Fátima is a small town located on the outskirts of Pilar, Buenos Aires Province, Argentina. Fatima is part of the Pilar Partido.

Fátima is of great financial importance to the city of Pilar because it is the location of Parque Industrial Pilar. This industrial park is home to some of the largest companies in the world such as Bayer, Unilever, Johnson Matthey, Merck Sharp & Dohme, Lola & Mora and Woodbridge.
