= People's Revolutionary Army (Argentina) =

1969–1981 far-left militant organization

- Leaders: Mario Roberto Santucho †; Benito Urteaga †; Enrique Gorriarán Merlo
- Dates active: 30 March 1969–24 December 1981
- Active regions: Buenos Aires (urban) & Tucumán (rural)
- Ideology: Marxism–Leninism; Communism; Maoism; Guevarism; Foco theory Trotskyism (factions)
- Political position: Far-left
- Size: 400-500 (1975)

The People's Revolutionary Army (Spanish: Ejército Revolucionario del Pueblo, abbreviated as ERP) was the military branch of the communist Workers' Revolutionary Party (Partido Revolucionario de los Trabajadores, PRT) in Argentina.

== History ==
=== Origins ===
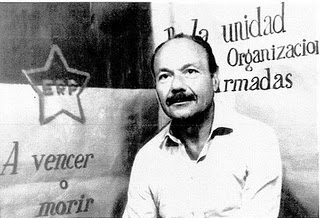
Oberdan Sallustro in the hands of the ERP; he was eventually shot and killed by the organization.

The ERP was founded as the armed wing of the PRT, a communist party emerging from the Trotskyist tradition, but soon turned to the Maoist theory, especially the Cultural Revolution. During the 1960s, the PRT adopted the foquista strategy of guerilla warfare associated with Che Guevara, who had fought alongside Fidel Castro during the Cuban Revolution.

The ERP launched its guerrilla campaign against the Argentine military dictatorship headed by Juan Carlos Onganía in 1969, using targeted urban guerrilla warfare methods such as assassinations and kidnappings of government officials and foreign company executives.

Between 29 and 30 May 1969, the "Cordobazo", a massive civil uprising and general strike took place in the city of Córdoba, in the central region of Argentina. It brought together an unprecedented alliance of industrial workers and university students who initially successfully seized control of the city to rebel against the military dictatorship of General Onganía.

The Argentine Army's 4th Airborne Infantry Brigade (Brigada de Infantería Aerotransportada IV) was heavily involved in putting down the 1969 Cordobazo. Because the brigade was based directly in Córdoba, the military dictatorship ordered the elite troops into the city streets when local police forces were completely overwhelmed by striking workers and students.

In 1973 Enrique Gorriarán Merlo and Benito Urteaga led the ERP kidnapping of Esso executive Victor Samuelson and obtaining a ransom of $12 million (equivalent to over $80 million today). They also assaulted several companies' offices using heavily armed commandos of the ERP's elite "Special Squad". Although claim and counter-claim are invariably difficult to reconcile, figures released for an official publication, Crónica de la subversión en la Argentina (Buenos Aires: Ediciones Depalma) at least give an indication of the kind of guerrilla activity undertaken, with claims that the rural guerrillas occupied 52 towns, robbed 166 banks and took US$76 million (equivalent to approximately US$565 million today) in ransoms for the kidnappings of 185 people.

The group continued the violent campaign even after democratic elections and the return to civilian rule in 1973, with Juan Peron's return. On 20 June 1973 the Peronist movement split after the Ezeiza massacre, that started when Lieutenant-Colonel Jorge Osinde's crowd monitoring right-wing Peronist militia reported the arrival of heavily armed Montoneros in two buses the day that Peron returned from exile. Victor E. Samuelson, an Exxon executive, was abducted on 6 December 1973 by the ERP. He was released after 144 days in captivity, after the Exxon Corporation paid a record ransom of $14.2 million. The avowed aim of the ERP was a communist revolution against the Argentine government in pursuit of "proletarian rule."

The ERP publicly remained in the forefront. ERP guerrilla activity took the form of attacks on army outposts, police stations and convoys. On 29 July 1971, ERP guerrillas shot dead retired Major Julio Famatino, former prison warden in the city of Córdoba. On 6 September 1971, an ERP force took over the Villa Urquiza Prison in Tucumán Province, liberating 14 fellow guerrilla fighters that had been captured and killing 5 prison guards(Raúl Villagra, Saul Carlos Rojas, José Rosas Abregú, Néstor Lobos and Juan Ordóñez. In 1971, 57 policemen were reported killed at the hands of left-wing guerrillas, and in 1972 another 38 policemen lost their lives in the guerrilla violence. On 17 March 1972, ERP gunmen killed Lieutenant-Colonel Pedro Agarotti from the National Gendarmerie while he tended his garden on his day-off from duties. On 20 March, ERP guerrillas set fire to a number of police vehicles undergoing maintenance in a garage repair shop in the suburb of Villa Devoto in Buenos Aires. On 28 December 1972, Marine Private Julio César Provenzano of the ERP, is killed when the bomb he planted in one of the lavatories of the Argentine Naval Headquarters went off prematurely. On 23 May 1973, two Ford executives (Luis Giovanelli, manager of Ford's analysis department and Noemi Baruj de la Rin, supervisor of industrial relations )were wounded and hospitalized after their cars and several other executives were stopped near the entrance of a number of Ford plants and their cars shot-up with sub-machine‐gun fire by masked ERP gunmen. On 3 April 1973, ERP guerrillas kidnapped Rear-Admiral Francisco Agustín Alemán.

Hector Cámpora’s first week as Argentina’s new president was marked by bloody street battles that left four dead and dozens wounded. On 25 May 1973, some 40,000 guerrilla sympathizers among the civilian population gathered at Villa Devoto prison demanding that all captured Montoneros and ERP members held inside be set free. To avoid a bloody confrontation, some 500 guerrillas and militants were physically let out of the gates that evening.

The presidential pardon and subsequent congressional amnesty delivered a profound institutional shock to Argentina's security apparatus. Embittered by the reality that years of hard police work and supporting counterinsurgency operations on the part of the armed forces had been erased overnight, the military and police leadership forged a sinister plot to never rely on the judicial system again. This "take no prisoners" pact cemented the nature of the state violence in Argentina; when the security forces launched their new campaigns, they abandoned lawful arrests and public indictments in favour of nocturnal, deniable abductions on the part of the Argentine Anti-Communist Alliance (Alianza Anticomunista Argentina or Triple A). These state-backed death-squads soon established a vast network of secret detention centres where suspected terrorists and their supporters were tortured without legal recourse and then executed. To erase the evidence of these murders and avoid leaving physical evidence, the death-squads turned to horrific disposal methods with prisoners buried anonymously in mass graves or remote plots, registered falsely under the acronym "N.N." (No Nomen, or No Name) and committing some of the worst crimes against humanity in Latin America.

In January 1974 the ERP Compañía Héroes de Trelew, named in commemoration of the 1972 Massacre of Trelew, during which 16 left-wing guerrillas who had attempted to escape detention had been shot dead, in the form of 80 guerrillas dressed in captured Argentine Army uniforms attacked the barracks at Azul, killing the Commanding Officer (Colonel Camilo Arturo Gay) and his wife (Hilda Irma Casaux) and kidnapping and later executing Lieutenant-Colonel Jorge Ibarzábal, with Patricia Gay the daughter of Gay and Casaux later taking her own life because of the trauma of witnessing the killing of her parents. However, in August, an assault on the Argentine Army's Villa Maria explosives factory in Cordoba and the 17th Airborne Infantry Regiment at Catamarca by 70 ERP guerrillas dressed in army fatigues, met mixed fortune after killing and wounding eight policemen and soldiers but losing 16 guerrillas shot dead after they surrendered to 300 paratroopers of the 17th Airborne Infantry Regiment under Lieutenant-Colonel Eduardo Humberto Cubas.

During the attack in Villa Maria, Lieutenant-Colonel Argentino del Valle Larraburu was kidnapped, taken to a safehouse that also served as a prison before meeting his brutal death at the hands of the ERP. Larrabure, a devout Catholic, allegedly sang the Argentine national anthem or religious hymns to keep his spirits up in the subterranean cell he was confined to. According to the findings of American political scientist and professor Paul H. Lewis in his book Guerrillas and Generals: The "Dirty War" in Argentina (2002), angered by his resistance and refusal to cooperate in sharing his chemical formulas to help ERP manufacture military-grade explosives his captors strangled him with a wire or cord and inflicted a severe blow to his skull.

On 23 October 1974, ERP guerrillas shot and killed Lieutenant-Colonel José Francisco Gardón as he was leaving the Buenos Aires hospital where he specialized in blood diseases. On 18 August 1975 Captain Miguel Alberto Keller, accompanied by an NCO and five conscripts were forced to stop their army lorry at what they believed to be a military checkpoint, and Keller was shot dead as he approached the ERP guerrillas waiting in ambush. In December 1975 a force of some 300 ERP guerrillas and supporting militants attacked the Monte Chingolo barracks outside Buenos Aires but lost 63 dead, many of whom were wounded in the attack and subsequently killed. In addition, seven army troops and three policemen were killed and 34 wounded (including 17 policemen). In all, 293 members of the Argentine Armed Forces were killed fighting left-wing guerrillas and militants between 1975 and 1976.

In 1976 there had been plans to send a large part of the Uruguayan Tupamaros (MLN-T), the Chilean Movimiento de Izquierda Revolucionaria (MIR) and the Bolivian National Liberation Army (ELN) to fight alongside the ERP and Montoneros in Argentina, but the plans failed to materialize largely due to the military coup in Argentina.

=== Operations in Tucumán and Buenos Aires ===
After the return of Juan Perón to the presidency in 1973, the ERP shifted to a rural strategy designed to secure a large land area as a base of military operations against the Argentine state. The ERP leadership chose to send the Compania del Monte Ramón Rosa Jimenez (Ramón Rosa Jimenez Mountain Company) to the province of Tucumán at the edge of the long-impoverished Andean highlands in the northwest corner of Argentina. Many of the officers in the rural guerrilleros company were trained in Cuba.

In July 2008, Cuban leader Fidel Castro admitted that he supported the guerrilla forces in South America: "The only place where we didn't attempt to promote a revolution was in Mexico. Everywhere else, without exception, we tried". Politician Gustavo Breide Obeid, who fought as an army captain against ERP guerrillas in Tucumán Province, claimed in 2007 that mercenaries from Jordan, Nicaragua and Angola served in the 'Ramón Rosa Jimenez' Mountain Company. By December 1974, the guerrillas numbered about 100 fighters, with a 400-person support network from the Montoneros. Led by Mario Roberto Santucho, they soon established control over a third of the province and organized a base of some 2,500 sympathizers.

Santucho's armed guerrillas in the northwestern province of Tucuman never exceeded 300 in the first year of Operativo Independencia.

The growth in ERP strength in the northwest, together with an increase in urban violence carried out by the left-Peronist Montoneros following Perón's death in 1974, led the government of Isabel Perón to issue "annihilation decrees" and expand the military's powers to fight a counter-insurgency campaign in February 1975. In all, 83 servicemen and policemen were killed in fighting the left-wing guerrillas, between 1973 and 1974.

Some 3,500 soldiers of the 5th Mountain Infantry Brigade, and two companies of elite commandos, placed under the command of Brigadier-General Acdel Vilas began immediately deploying in the Tucumán mountains in Operacion Independencia, joined later by 1,500 more troops from the 4th Airborne Infantry Brigade and 8th Mountain Infantry Brigade. The pattern of the war was largely dictated by the nature of the terrain, the mountains, rivers and extensive jungle denying both sides easy movement. The A-4B Skyhawk fighters and B.62 Canberra bombers of the Argentine Air Force were used for offensive air support while the North American T-34 and FMA IA 58 Pucará served as a light ground-attack and reconnaissance aircraft. While fighting the guerrilla in the jungle and mountains, Vilas concentrated on uprooting the ERP support network in the towns, using state terror tactics later adopted nationwide during the "Dirty War", as well as a civic action campaign. By July, the Argentine Army commandos were mounting search-and-destroy missions. The Army special forces discovered Santucho's base camp in August, then raided the ERP urban headquarters in September. Most of the Compania del Monte's headquarters staff was killed in October and the remainder dispersed by the end of the year. While most of the leaders of the movement were killed outright, many of the captured ERP subalterns and sympathizers were incarcerated during the government of Isabel Perón, but little mercy was shown to captured guerrillas and civilian collaborators during the military dictatorship.

Monte Ramón Rosa Jiménez Company Flag

In May 1975, ERP representative Amilcar Santucho was captured trying to cross into Paraguay to promote the JCR unity effort. As a way to save himself, he provided information about the organization to Secretaría de Inteligencia (SIDE) agents that enabled Argentine security agencies to destroy what was left of the ERP, although pockets of ERP guerrillas continued to operate in the heavily wooded Tucuman mountains for many months. The case, during which an FBI official transmitted information obtained from the prisoners (Amilcar was detained along with a MIR member) to the Chilean DINA, was one practical operation of Operation Condor, which had started in 1973.

Meanwhile, the guerrilla movement switched its main effort to the north and on 5 October 1975 guerrillas struck the 29th Mountain Infantry Regiment. The 5th Brigade suffered a major blow at the hands of Montoneros, when over one-hundred—perhaps several hundred—Montoneros guerrillas and milicianos (militants) were involved in the planning and execution of the most elaborate Montoneros operation in the so-called "Dirty War", which involved the hijacking of a civilian airliner, taking over the provincial airport, attacking the 29th Infantry Regiment's barracks at Formosa province and capturing its cache of arms, and finally escaping by air. Once the operation was over, they made good their escape towards a remote area in Santa Fe province. The aircraft, a Boeing 737, eventually landed on a crop field not far from the city of Rafaela. In the aftermath, 12 soldiers and 2 policemen were killed and several wounded. The sophistication of the operation, and the getaway cars and safehouses they used to escape from the crash-landing site, suggest several hundred guerrillas and their civilian supporters were involved.

In December 1975 most 5th Brigade units were committed to the border areas of Tucumán with over 5,000 troops deployed in the province. There was however, nothing to prevent infiltrating through this outer ring and the ERP were still strong inside Buenos Aires. Mario Santucho's Christmas offensive opened on 23 December 1975. The operation was dramatic in its impact, with ERP units, supported by Montoneros, mounting a large scale assault against the army supply base Domingo Viejobueno at the industrial suburb of Monte Chingolo, south of Buenos Aires. The attackers were defeated and driven off with 53 ERP guerrillas and 9 supporting militants killed. Seven army troops and three policemen were reported killed. In this particular battle the ERP and supporting Montoneros militants had about 1,000 deployed against 1,000 government forces. This large-scale operation was made possible not only by the planning of the guerrillas involved, but also by their supporters who provided houses to hide them, supplies and the means of escape.

On 30 December a bomb exploded at the headquarters of the Argentine Army in Buenos Aires, injuring at least six soldiers. In the eyes of the military, the credibility of the government was now destroyed and the strategy of attrition was bankrupt. The guerrillas had even successfully utilized divers of the Grupo Especial de Combate of the Montoneros: the modern type 42 destroyer Santísima Trinidad was severely damaged by explosives placed under her keel by frogmen of the Montoneros on 22 August 1975 while moored in the port of Ensenada. The damage was so great that the ship remained unseaworthy for several years. By the end of 1975, a total of 137 servicemen and police had been killed that year by left wing guerrillas. Elements within the armed forces, particularly among the junior officers, blamed the weakness of the government and began to seek a leader who they considered was strong enough to ensure a preservation of Argentinian sovereignty, settling on Lieutenant-General Jorge Videla. On 11 February 1976, colonel Raúl Rafael Reyes, the commander of the 601st Air Defence Artillery Group, was killed and two army conscripts (Privates Tempone and Gómez) wounded in an ambush by six ERP guerrillas in the La Plata suburb of Buenos Aires.

The Argentine armed forces moved ahead with the "Dirty War", dispensing with the civilian government through a coup d'état in March 1976. In his editorial immediately after the military takeover, Santucho wrote that "a river of blood will separate the military from the Argentine people", and this would result in a popular uprising followed by a civil war.

On 29 March 1976, the ERP leadership lost twelve killed in a gun battle in downtown Buenos Aires with army elements (including the ERP Chief of Intelligence) but Santucho along with fifty guerrillas were able to fight their way out of the ambush. The Argentine Army and police scored more success in mid-April in Córdoba, when in a series of raids it captured and later killed some 300 militants entrusted with supporting the ERP operations in that province.

During the first few months of the military junta, more than 70 policemen were killed in leftist actions In mid-1976, the Argentine Army completely destroyed the ERP's elite "Special Squad" in two violent firefights. The ERP's commander, Mario Roberto Santucho, and Benito Urteaga were killed in July of that year by military forces led by captain Juan Carlos Leonetti of the 601st Intelligence Battalion that stormed their hiding place in the form of an apartment. The two surviving female militants in the unit (Liliana Delfino and Ana María Lanzilotto, both pregnant) were abducted, taken to clandestine torture centers, and became part of the "desaparecidos" (disappeared) after first being allowed to give birth, with their children adopted and raised by either military or conservative civilian families.

Several hundred militants of the Guevarist Youth Group in training for military operations to coincide with the 1978 World Cup in Argentina, were soon captured and also became part of the disappeared in a series of raids in Zárate soon afterwards. Although the ERP continued for a while under the leadership of Enrique Gorriarán Merlo, by late 1977 the guerrilla threat had been eradicated or gone underground.

In 2008, the PRT-ERP reported the loss of 5,000 of its guerrillas and militants killed in action or murdered after having disappeared after first being detained.The Montoneros later admitted that 5,000 of their guerrillas and militants were also killed in action or forcibly disappeared and never seen again.According to a declassified "Dirección de Inteligencia Nacional" (National Intelligence Directorate or DINA) cable at the time, the total number of people killed or missing in Argentina was 22,000 between 1975 and mid-1978.The DINA cable states, "Se tienen computados 22.000 entre muertos y desaparecidos desde 1975 a la fecha," which does not distinguish between confirmed dead and disappeared individuals still being held alive in clandestine detention centres. The secret police report does not definitively confirm that all 22,000 missing were deceased at the time of writing, nor does it mention a pending grant of PEN detainee status under pressure mounting from outside Argentina. Admittedly there were 12,000 disappeared in the form of PEN detainees that survived the Argentine dictatorship, thanks to international pressure to release them from the clandestine detention camps.

By that time the Argentine military had taken power in Argentina it had expanded its own campaign against "subversives" to include state terror against active civilian collaborators, but that some vehemently argue were non-violent students, intellectuals, and political activists who were wrongly presumed to form the under-gound network of the left-wing guerrillas, but were in reality the non-combatant base of the insurgents.

According to different sources, 12,261 to 30,000 people, are estimated to have disappeared and died during the military dictatorship that ruled Argentina from 1976 to 1983. Justice Minister Ricardo Gil Lavedra, who was part of the 1985 tribunal judging military crimes committed during Argentina's Dirty War, later went on record saying that "I sincerely believe that the majority of the victims of the illegal repression were guerrilla militants".

In 1979, Amnesty International claimed that 15,000 Argentines had been forcibly disappeared, according to the records of the various Human rights organizations with 600 abductions reported having taking place in 1978 and another 36 Argentines reported missing the following year. In the newspaper The New York Times, reporter David Vidal wrote on 5 January 1979 that the number of people disappeared throughout Latin America during that period numbered 30,000.The newspapers The Christian Science Monitor and The Boston Globe soon followed suit with similar stories, claiming that 30,000 people had disappeared under military dictatorships in Latin America, not only Argentina.The newspaper The Los Angeles Times repeated the claims about 30,000 Latin Americans—not only Argentines—disappeared in new articles published in October and November 1979.

Terence Roehrig, in his book The Prosecution of Former Military Leaders in Newly Democratic Nations: The Cases of Argentina, Greece, and South Korea (Pg 42, McFarland & Company, 2001), estimates that of the disappeared in Argentina "at least 10,000 were involved in various ways with the guerrillas". Some 11,000 Argentines have applied for and received up to US$200,000 for each family member disappeared as monetary compensation for the loss of loved ones during the military dictatorship. The PRT continued political activities, although limited to few members, organizing conventions even after democracy returned to the country. In December 2015, Professor Gustavo Morello (SJ) in his book The Catholic Church and Argentina's Dirty War (Oxford University Press, 2015) concluded that during the "Dirty War" in Argentina "15,000 people were killed, 8,000 were jailed and some 6,000 were exiled."

=== Aftermath ===
After the destruction of the left-wing in Argentina, some revolutionary cadres made their way to Nicaragua, where the Sandinistas had taken power in 1979. An ERP commando team comprising veterans of the "Dirty War" under Gorriarán Merlo, for example, demonstrated their active involvement in the revolutionary struggle by killing ex-dictator Anastasio Somoza in 1980. Gorriarán returned to Argentina in 1987 to become a leader of the Movimiento Todos por la Patria (All For the Motherland Movement or MTP).

Claiming another military coup by the Carapintadas was imminent against the new democratic government of Raúl Alfonsín (which at the time was leading a series of trials against members of the Argentine Military accused of human rights violations), Enrique Gorriarán Merlo led the 1989 attack on La Tablada Regiment, during which the Argentine army used white phosphorus as an anti-personnel weapon, and in which the guerrillas used captured army conscripts as 'shields' and ended in the capture of the surviving MTP members. Alfonsín countered the claim that the MTP were trying to forestall a military coup and declared that the attack had the ultimate goal of sparking a massive popular uprising, that could have led to civil war. In their newspapers and in the Argentine press, the Mothers of the Plaza de Mayo denounced the way Alfonsín had handled the La Tablada incident, making a connection between what had happened to their disappeared children and the treatment endured by the MTP guerrillas. Gorriarán was given a life sentence along with other MTP comrades, but was freed by interim president Eduardo Duhalde two days before Néstor Kirchner's access to power in 2003. In protest to Duhalde's decision, former Lieutenant-Colonel Emilio Guillermo Nani who took part in the fighting to recover the La Tablada barracks and lost an eye as a consequence, formally announced that he would be returning the medal for wounded military personnel that he won during the administration of Argentine president Raúl Alfonsín. The MTP still exist today as a political movement which has abandoned armed struggle.

In January 2016 for the first time in decades, Mauricio Macri (the previous president of Argentina) through the new Human Rights Secretary Claudio Avruj, granted an audience to CELTYV (Centre for Legal Studies on Terrorism and its Victims) representing the victims of left-wing terrorism in Argentina in a move that drew strong condemnation from Estela Barnes de Carlotto, head of the Grandmothers of Plaza de Mayo.

In 2026, the Argentine government headed by President Javier Milei and Vice President Victoria Villarruel openly rejected the idea that 30,000 people disappeared, claiming the actual number of victims to be around 8,753 and arguing that the 30,000 figure was fabricated by left-wing activists to secure international financial aid and media attention. They preached a "complete memory" narrative that frames the 1976–1983 era as a real internal "war" rather than systematic state terrorism, describing any crimes against humanity on the part of the Argentine military as mere "excesses" committed while finding and eradicating left-wing guerrilla groups and their supporters. Under this stance, they explicitly condemned Marxist guerrilla organizations like the People's Revolutionary Army (ERP) and Montoneros as terrorists, asserting that the traditional narrative of the previous left-wing governments had unjustly ignored the victims of guerrilla violence while granting political and judicial "impunity" to the lefttist terrorists.

== See also ==
- Dirty War
- Montoneros
- Nicaragua Betrayed
- Raúl Argemí

== Bibliography ==
- Guerrillas and Generals: The Dirty War in Argentina, by Paul H. Lewis (2001).
- Nosotros Los Santucho, by Blanca Rina Santucho (1997, in Spanish).
- Argentina's Lost Patrol : Armed Struggle, 1969-1979, by Maria Moyano (1995).
- Argentina, 1943-1987: The National Revolution and Resistance, by Donald C. Hodges (1988).
- Monte Chingolo, la mayor batalla de la guerrilla argentina, by Gustavo Plis-Sterenberg (2003).
