= Camilo Torres Restrepo =

Colombian Catholic revolutionary (1929–1966)

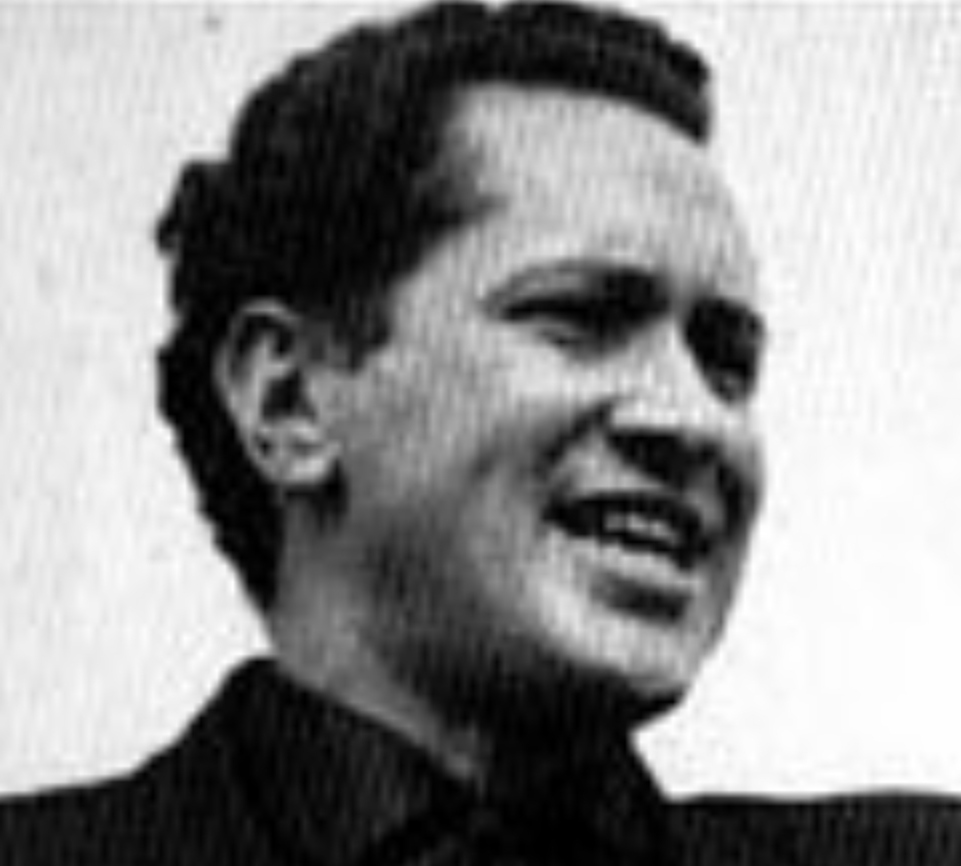
- Born: Camilo Torres Restrepo; 3 February 1929; Bogotá, Colombia
- Died: 15 February 1966 (aged 37); San Vicente de Chucurí, Santander, Colombia
- Cause of death: Killed in action
- Occupations: ELN guerilla (1966); Politician (1965-66); Priest (1954-1965)
- Parent(s): Calixto Torres Umaña; Isabel Restrepo Gaviria

Ecclesiastical career
- Religion: Christianity
- Church: Roman Catholic Church (Latin Church)
- Ordained: 1954 (priest)
- Laicized: June 1965
- Writings: Message to Christians; Proclamation to the Colombian People

Jorge Camilo Torres Restrepo (3 February 1929 – 15 February 1966), also known by his nom de guerre Argemiro, was a Colombian Catholic political leader, revolutionary, guerilla, priest, author and a leader of the National Liberation Army (ELN). During his life, he sought to reconcile revolutionary socialism and Catholicism, an ideology which became known as Camilism. This ideology would significantly influence the later liberation theology movement, as well as being adopted by the Montoneros.

As part of the academic staff of the National University of Colombia, he was a co-founder of the Sociology Faculty together with Orlando Fals Borda, as well as some intellectuals such as Eduardo Umaña Luna, María Cristina Salazar, Virginia Gutiérrez de Pineda, Carlos Escalante, Darío Botero and Tomás Ducay, in 1960. His involvement in several student and political movements during the time won him a large following as well as many detractors, especially from the Colombian government and the Church itself. Due to the growing pressure to back down from his radical politics, Torres requested to be and was laicized (although he never abandoned his faith and he remained a devout Catholic).

Torres founded the socialist United Front, which lasted only a month. After the failure of the United Front, he joined the Marxist-Leninist ELN in Colombia. He mostly served as a low-ranking member of the movement, to which he also provided spiritual assistance and inspiration from a Catholic point of view. After becoming a leader of the ELN, he was killed in his first combat engagement when the guerrillas ambushed a Colombian military patrol. After his death, Camilo Torres was made an official martyr of the ELN. In 1987, the organization was renamed the Camilista Union - National Liberation Army.

Characterized by some as the "Colombian Che Guevara", Torres is perhaps best known for the quote: "If Jesus were alive today, He would be a guerrillero". While the press described him as a communist, Torres, for at least the majority of his life, rejected the label, declaring instead that while he would fight with the communists for common goals, he did not want to be identified with the communists. He also declared that he was not an anti-communist.

Camilo Torres, along with the Catholic clergymen Hélder Câmara and Des Wilson, is one of the most important figures in the history of liberation theology. He was a friend of fellow socialist Luis Villar Borda, Colombian writer Gabriel García Márquez and liberation theology pioneer Gustavo Gutiérrez. In the Dominican Republic in 1970, a revolutionary group that included Catholic clergy and university students formed CORECATO (Comando Revolucionario Camilo Torres; "Camilo Torres Revolutionary Command").

== Biography ==
=== Childhood and education ===
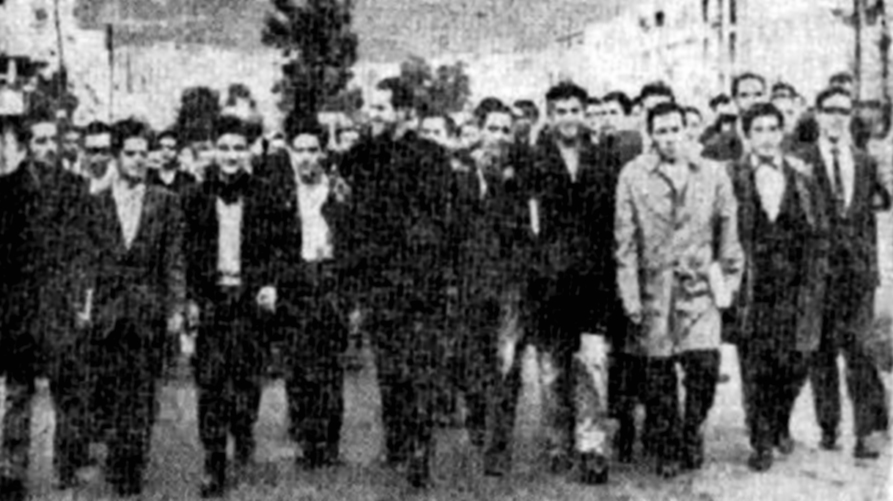
Camilo Torres (center, looking sideways) marching with students

Jorge Camilo Torres Restrepo was born on 3 February 1929 in Bogotá into a well-to-do family of the liberal bourgeoisie. His mother Isabel told him the story of Father Cuco (Juan de la Cruz Gaviria), a liberal businessman who financed the military campaigns against the conservatives in the civil wars of the 19th century.

His parents took him to Europe when he was only two years old. He returned to the country in 1934. Three years later, in 1937, the couple separated, leaving Camilo and his brother Fernando at their mother's side. Expelled for his criticism of the teachers at the traditional Colegio Mayor de Nuestra Señora del Rosario, he finished his baccalaureate at the Liceo de Cervantes in 1946 where he met and became friends with Luis Villar Borda and Ricardo Samper.

His sister Gerda Westendorp Restrepo, daughter of Isabel Restrepo's first marriage, was a medical student (the first woman in Colombia to pursue a university degree). Her brother Fernando devoted himself to medicine like his father and older half-sister, and settled in the United States. He was close to Camilo although their professions caused them to see each other sporadically.

Camilo Torres entered the Faculty of Law at the Universidad Nacional de Colombia, where he would meet again with Villar Borda, and only studied there for the first semester. During this brief period Camilo and Luis edited the university page of the Bogota newspaper La Razón, and on some occasions wrote criticisms against some university magazines that they considered radical.

Influenced by the social ideas of two French Dominican priests, Nielly and Blanchet, whom he met through the father of his girlfriend Teresa Montalvo, daughter of a prestigious Bogota family, the idea of becoming a priest began to take hold of Camilo, and to make this decision, he withdrew to meditate in the eastern plains. After breaking up with his girlfriend and despite the reluctance of his mother and father, Camilo entered the Conciliar Seminary of Bogotá of the Archdiocese of Bogotá (in agreement with his parents to avoid entering the Dominican Seminary of Chiquinquirá which was in poor condition) where he remained for seven years, during which time he began to take an interest in social realities.

=== Priesthood and academic life ===
Poverty and social injustice attracted his attention and, together with his fellow disciple Gustavo Pérez, he created a social studies circle that functioned even after Torres was ordained a priest in 1954 under the direction of Jonatan Gómez. Camilo started social activities in the neighbourhoods surrounding the Conciliar Seminary, which were populated by displaced families from the countryside.

In 1955, in order to specialize, Torres travelled to Belgium, to study for a few more years at the Catholic University of Louvain. The first months were very difficult for the Bogota priest because of the cold climate, Belgian food and the conditions of the boarding house where he lived with Gustavo; for this reason, at the end of the first semester, he moved with his mother to a flat. With a group of Colombian students at the university, he founded the ECISE (Equipo Colombiano de Investigación Socioeconómica) and came into contact with Christian Democracy, the Christian trade union movement and Algerian resistance groups in Paris. He founded the Bogota, Paris and London sections of ECISE. In 1957 he met Marguerite-Marie 'Guitemie' Olivieri, a Frenchwoman of Corso origin and bourgeois daughter of a doctor like Torres, who was to become his closest friend and secretary, and who by then was living in a poor neighbourhood of Paris, accompanying the pieds noirs in sabotage work against the French regime that was being imposed by force in Algeria. In turn, Torres met Villar Borda again in Berlin and spent holidays in Belgrade where he unsuccessfully wanted to exercise his priesthood, or failing that in Prague. In 1958, the Belgian university awarded him the degree of sociologist. His doctoral thesis, Una aproximación estadística a la realidad socioeconómica de Bogotá, a pioneering work in urban sociology in Latin America, was published in 1987 under the title La proletarización de Bogotá.

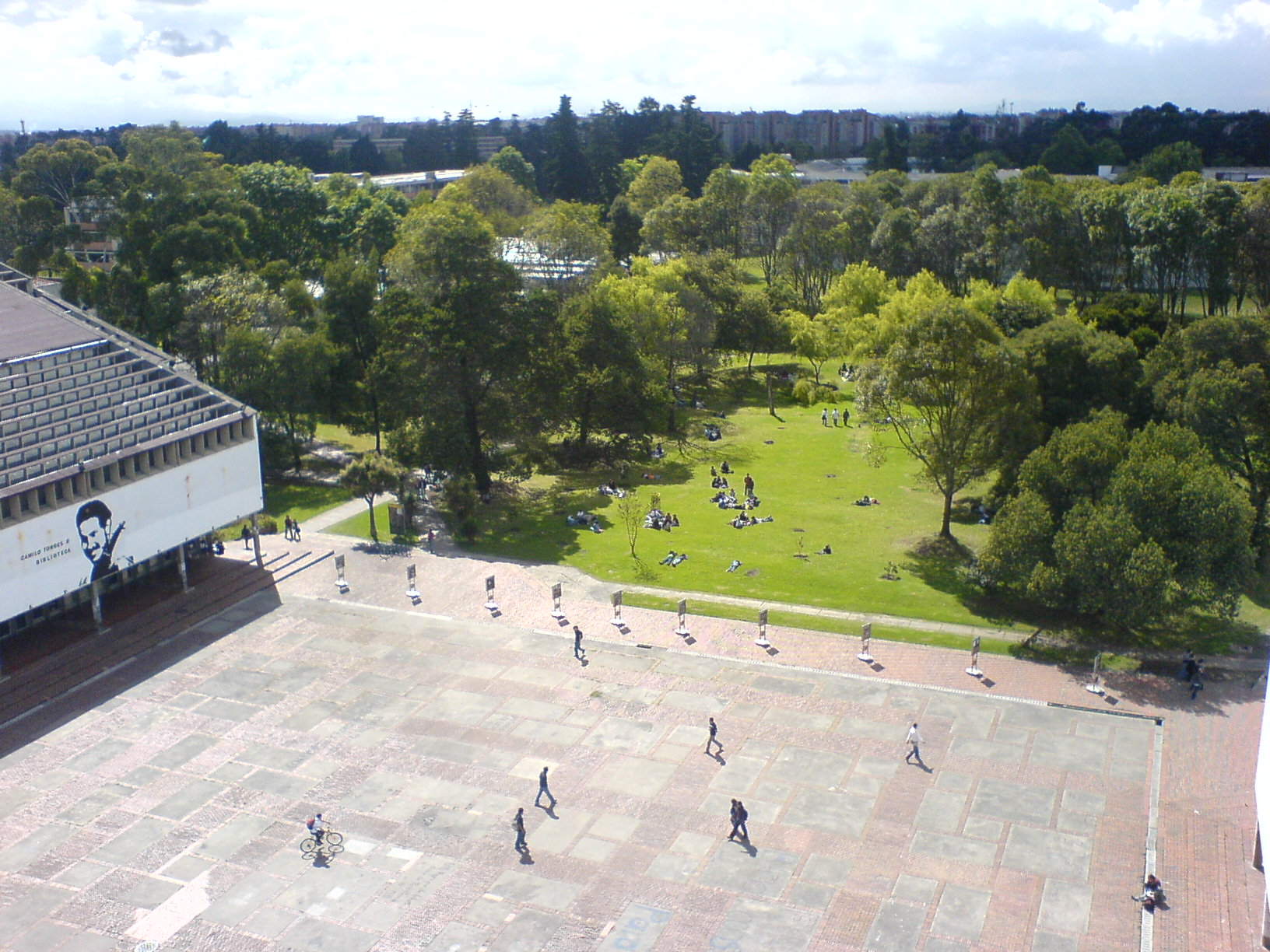
Wall painting homage to Camilo Torres located at the National University of Colombia.

While studying, Torres also studied Marxism after being given a permission to do so by the Cardinal Crisanto Luque Sánchez. He was also exposed to the worker-priest movement; according to Walter J. Broderick, "Camilo came in on the tail-end of it and was enormously affected by the spirit of commitment to the working masses which this movement had aroused in the more generous elements of the French and Belgian clergy". The impact was profound, and Camilo would accompany a local priest, who adhered to the worker-priest movement, to the poor districts. Broderick recalls that Camilo "became engaged in activities with flesh and blood people. He rarely missed a chance to help out at weekends in a parish of coal miners not far from Louvain, and would go back to his books pondering on what he had seen and heard: the hardships of the miners’ lives, their pastor's anguish for them and his efforts to improve their lot. For the pastor of this mining town was a firm convert to the Priest Worker Movement."

After witnessing the poverty of Belgian miners, and under the influence of the worker-priest movement and Marxism, Camilo became embarrassed at his own luxury, and decided to sell his car and live as humbly as possible. After Camilo informed his mother of his decision, she chastized him; Camilo responded that his 'bourgeois' status was preventing him from establishing a "real contact" with the workers, whom he came to see as the embodiment of "the person of Jesus". Torres also stayed in touch with his friends from Colombia through letters, who informed him of dissemination of communist guerrillas and movements in Colombia; Camilo's friend Miguel wrote to him: "In my free time I'm working with the workers, finally...! They have many needs of all kinds and we are going to see how we can organise them to solve them. [...] On the subject of the country [...] I can add that the guerrillas seem to be fuelled by communism, which has gained ground even against the president." Camilo Torres' fascination with Marxism led him to visit the Soviet Union at the time and praise Joseph Stalin. Camilo's friend who became a communist, Jaime Díaz, praised Camilo for going to Moscow and "praying at the miraculous tomb of our father Stalin".

In 1959, when he returned to Colombia, Camilo felt compelled to actively support the cause of the poor and the working class. That year he was appointed auxiliary chaplain of the National University of Colombia, in Bogotá. The following year, in 1960, he participated along with Orlando Fals Borda, Carlos Escalante, Eduardo Umaña Luna, María Cristina Salazar, Darío Botero Uribe, Virginia Gutiérrez de Pineda and Tomás Ducay, among others, in the founding of the first faculty of Sociology in Latin America (today a department) of the Universidad Nacional de Colombia, where he was a professor and was close to and popular with the students. He was a founding member and president of the Movimiento Universitario de Promoción Comunal (MUNIPROC). With the creation of the Juntas de Acción Comunal (JAC), promoted by the government of Alberto Lleras Camargo, from Law 9 of 1958, Torres recognises in it the possibility of decentralising political power and giving possibilities of empowerment to grassroots communities. Together with teachers and students, he carried out community action programmes in working-class neighbourhoods in Bogotá. Torres was also the organiser of the IX Congress of the Latin American Sociological Association.

MUNIPROC's work led to the founding of the first Junta de Acción Comunal (JAC) in Tunjuelito, at that time a working class enclave in the south of Bogotá, where he had been working continuously for several years. In 1963, he chaired the first National Congress of Sociology, also held in Tunjuelito (Bogotá), and presented the study "La violencia y los cambios socio-culturales en las áreas rurales colombianas" (Violence and socio-cultural changes in rural areas of Colombia). Torres was also a member of the technical committee of the agrarian reform founded by the Colombian Institute of Agrarian Reform (INCORA), where he represented the most reformist position of the Board of Directors, which was divided between the Conservative and Liberal parties, typical of the National Front but considered by Torres an inefficient entity in the face of the needs of the Colombian countryside. In his career as a member of the Board, the episode of the project to set up an Agrarian School in Yopal (Casanare) and the difficulties presented by the then director of INCORA Enrique Peñalosa Camargo (liberal, father of the former mayor of Bogotá Enrique Peñalosa Londoño) and Álvaro Gómez Hurtado (conservative, son of former president Laureano Gómez) stand out.

During this period of his life he was interested in founding a farm-school in Yopal (Casanare), as part of the rural action programme that he encouraged in the region and which would go on to achieve other organisational successes; on the board of the Incora, he sparked off a controversy over the application of the law of extinction of ownership restricted to uncultivated lands, which brought him into conflict with Álvaro Gómez Hurtado, also a member of that body and head of the "Laureanist" group of the Conservative Party. Because of the resonance of this conflict, some conservative bishops wrote to the Cardinal to request his dismissal from the board. Invited to Peru, he gave courses and lectures on the subject of agrarian reform and social change. His view of the Latin American situation is not flattering, as he expresses it in a letter from Lima. He writes:

Lima is not Peru. There are six million pure Indians who consider the other four million as strangers. I have been very frustrated to be able to establish nothing but a tourist relationship with the Indians. This is the truest and weakest base of the Latin American revolution. Their social situation is appalling. However, the purges continue in Brazil. Those who think are punished. Reaction is beginning to walk all over our continent as if the majorities did not exist. Until when! We progressives are very intelligent. We speak very well. We are popular. When we are together we are really nice. But reaction moves one of its powerful fingers and paralyses us! We cannot go on without organisation and equal arms, at least.

In 1962, the year in which the Second Vatican Council was initiated by Pope John XXIII, Torres was one of the first priests to offer a Mass facing forward and in Spanish, when by then the Mass was offered facing backwards and in Latin. Between 8 and 9 June of that year, under pressure from Cardinal Luis Concha Córdoba, after entering, together with other professors, into contradictions with the rector, by honouring at mass the students killed after a demonstration repressed by the National Police and by opposing the expulsion of other students, he was forced to resign from all his activities at the National University of Colombia, being transferred to the Church of La Veracruz in Bogotá as coadjutor; assistant to the parish priest with only confession and baptismal functions. This unleashed a strong depression in Torres, who wanted to be close to the people. Shortly before, the Colombian Communist Youth (JUCO) had proposed Torres as rector of the University to a possible shortlist of three but Torres politely declined the offer for fear of tarnishing his name.

In 1964, Concha would later relieve Torres as coadjutor, only admiring Torres as a sociologist, allowing him to become an associate professor in the Faculty of Sociology. He was in turn appointed dean of the Institute of Social Administration of the Escuela Superior de Administración Pública (ESAP) and promoted to member of the Board of Directors of INCORA.

The Unidad de Acción Rural de Yopal (UARY) was inaugurated on 1 March 1964, after overcoming the bureaucratic obstacles of the Ministry of Agriculture, which allowed him to work at the grassroots with the peasants of the capital of the plains. He combined this with the struggles in the junta, especially with the conservative politician who was a staunch defender of the interests of the landowners. He first considered creating a guerrilla group together with Álvaro Marroquín, a student at the National University and member of the JUCO. Torres in turn considered INCORA a deficient entity to attend to the needs of the Colombian peasantry, especially in informal education for their organization in search of an agrarian reform different to that proposed by INCORA.

=== Entering politics ===
The Cuban Revolution, which impacted every country in the Americas, caught Torres' attention after he returned to Colombia from Europe. In 1965, the Movimiento Revolucionario Libera (MRL) went into decline after its split following the presidential elections of 1962. The 1964 parliamentary elections were marked by an enormous abstention, in which Torres concluded that the traditional parties; Liberal and Conservative, were abandoned by public opinion, so he considered creating a new instrument that would bring together the "Non-aligned" in politics; unions, guilds, associations, students and workers, to confront the decadent traditional parties, although for the time being calling for abstentionism. Torres also tried unsuccessfully to act as a mediator between the peasants and the National Army to prevent the attack on the so-called Independent Republic of Marquetalia, which was his first contact with the Colombian Communist Party.

The Bay of Pigs Invasion, an American-sponsored attempt to overthrow the Cuban regime, rallied socialist guerrillas and revolutionary student movements across the Latin America, and it exposed Torres to the ideas of anti-imperialism. At the time, he identified as progressive Catholic and was unafraid to raise topics such as poverty and unstable political situation of Colombia. His light-hearted manners made his masses appeal to a wider public, even including atheists. This also marked the time of his rapid radicalization. Torres argued that the Catholic Church is devoted to charity and fighting social inequality, crediting the Church with introducing revolutionary changes to society such as the abolition of slavery and democratic valorization of the human being. However, he believed that in order to truly realise the concept of Christian charity, a total change of power structures was needed, as the hitherto structures were responsible for social and economical inequality and poverty:

These structures will not change without pressure being exerted by the masses, and that pressure will be violent or nonviolent according to the attitude adopted by the minority governing classes. There is nothing to be afraid of, for in a society which needs structural change, genuine authority is earned by revolutionary commitment, and that commitment, for the Christian, should be a commitment out of charity. The moral authority thus gained will give the Christian the right to demand concessions the day the Marxists come to power.

He pointed out that the ones who were in the forefront of the fight to change structures were Marxists, and this brought him to the conclusion that collaborating with the Marxists was a necessity. At the same time, he discussed the Marxist thought in his writings - he initially criticised vanguardism, attacking Lenin's concept of "the revolution by the elite", insisting that a revolution can only be carried out by ordinary people instead. He later changed this view, influenced by the Cuban Revolution. He regarded Marxist humanism as a product of the Christian humanist movement, and argued that Marxist principles stem from Christianity itself. He began to admire socialists for fighting for a better society, and believed that Catholics should support their efforts:

The revolutionaries are so few, and we progressive Catholics are also very few. Historically there was only one mistake the Christian could make: to refuse to act.

In 1964, the Cardinal Luis Concha Córdoba informed the national public opinion that no priest could collaborate in the socioeconomic study commission that had been set up to intervene in the case of Marquetalia, Tolima; this commission, of which Camilo Torres was a member, was trying to evaluate the situation in that region and at the same time to prevent a military solution to the conflict. An attempt is being made to stop a peasant movement that has declared the area an "independent republic". In the absence of support and guarantees, the rest of the commission was forced to back down - bombings and military occupation of the region followed, leading to the withdrawal of the peasant militias that would later form the guerrilla movement known as the Revolutionary Armed Forces of Colombia. At least in its first period, the FARC had the backing of the Colombian Communist Party.

Later the same year, Torres came into closer contact with groups that agreed with the armed revolution or were already committed to it. He was sympathetic to these groups and his solidarity with them grew stronger and stronger. The Cuban-oriented guerrilla group, the National Liberation Army was founded on 4 July 1964, and made its public appearance with the seizure of the town of Simacota in Santander on 7 January 1965. Camilo considered it extremely important to connect with this insurgent group and he managed to do so through his urban networks.

In 1965, his activities as head of the Institute of Social Administration of the ESAP began to be strongly criticised for their political bias. Faced with the failure of some intellectuals who had undertaken to write articles and papers for a publication aimed at making the situation of Colombian society visible from the perspective of the social sciences, Camilo drafted a political platform open to debate by different groups of intellectuals, students and workers, in which he proposed the union of the popular class to socially renovate the country. This document was widely disseminated during his travels around the country and, thanks to the discussion it was subjected to during this tour, became the platform of the United Front of the Colombian People, the political movement that Camilo promoted as an alternative for the transformation of society in Colombia.

=== The United Front ===
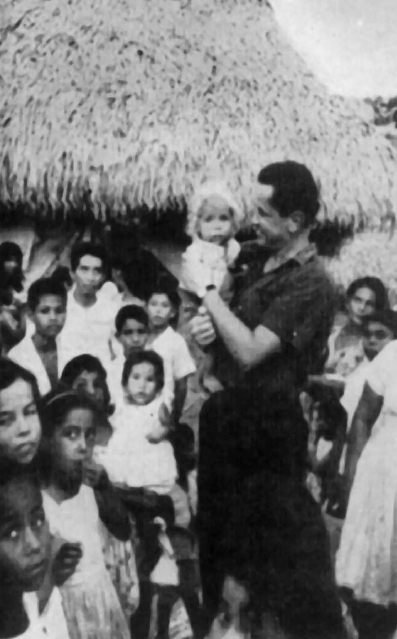
Camilo Torres with Colombian peasant children

The National Front regime led Camilo Torres in January 1964 to found the Frente Unido del Pueblo; a movement in opposition to the coalition of the traditional parties. Torres went to the home of Marroquín and his partner María Arango to seek contacts with the Communist Party. A meeting with the goal to create a political platform was held, with the participation of the MOEC, the MRL Youth, the JUCO and some student groups from the Universidad de los Andes. However, the hierarchs of the Colombian Church sought to make Torres travel to Leuven, with the ESAP offering to cover the travel costs. However, a meeting in homage to Torres held by the students of the National University dissuaded Torres from travelling. Although Torres was not yet politically active and had no clear political discourse, he was already quite popular.

Torres sought to bring together all the opposition of the time (Anapo, MRL and Colombian Communist Party); however, he didn't declare himself a Marxist due to the atheism of the ideology, but related several points to Catholicism itself instead. In June 1965, at his request, Torres was reduced to the lay state by his ecclesiastical superior, Cardinal Concha; at the same time he was removed from his post at ESAP and once again had disagreements with Concha, who offered him and his coadjutor bishop Rubén Isaza the post of director of sociology department in the Archdiocese of Bogotá with the mediation of then-priest Ernesto Umaña de Brigard. Torres turned down the offer, seeing that the position was to prevent him from intervening in politics as well as presenting the socio-political platform in Medellín, which was the reason why he had previously been removed from his position at the ESAP.

Concha argued that the platform went against Catholic ideals and that priests should be apolitical in order to dissociate themselves from Catholicism's ambiguous and traditional relationship with the Conservative Party. Torres met with Concha, who vehemently opposed Torres' entry into politics. Umaña then met with Torres and offered him an ecclesiastical post, but Torres requested a dispensation so that he could devote himself to politics and avoid problems with the ecclesiastical authority. Torres gave his last Mass on 27 June 1965 in the Church of San Diego in Bogotá. Torres then travelled to Lima, returning to Bogotá on 3 July to be received by his mother and a crowd of young people. According to Torres' mother, before his laicization, Camilo had been visited by some politicians and was told that, if he wrote to Rome that he would lead his flock to the existing political parties and away from the guerilla movement, he would become a cardinal. He rejected by saying "I'm not for sale, friends."

The platform of his movement sought to address the needs of rural and urban areas, to eliminate the restricted democracy of the National Front at all costs, and the participation of the Church in liberation theology. However, the National Front lacked a clear political platform, despite being close to and sympathetic to the revolutionary left; they also had their own newspaper, headed by Pedro Acosta, of the same name, which was only distributed three times a week from 26 August 1965, printed in the workshops of the Antares publishing house and owned by Torres' friend Gonzalo Canal Ramírez.

Despite the growing popularity of the United Front, Torres decided to contact Fabio Vásquez Castaño through student leader Jaime Arenas on 6 July 1965, who had previously led the strike at the Universidad Industrial de Santander. The United Front lasted from August to September 1965 (one month) after breaking with Christian Democracy for imposing a guerrilla line. His decision to resort to armed struggle was taken in the case of Jorge Eliécer Gaitán and expressed to Gloria Gaitán, daughter of the assassinated leader, who offered asylum to Torres, who gradually went underground. Despite this, Torres led a peaceful march with his students in Medellín and was arrested with his demonstrators, all university students, and held at the Asociación Sindical Antioqueña. He would later be intercepted in Ventaquemada on his way to Tunja, and in Bogotá he would also be detained after police repression of a demonstration by the Frente Unido. On 7 January 1966, Torres announced his incorporation into the ELN.

=== Catholic guerrilla ===
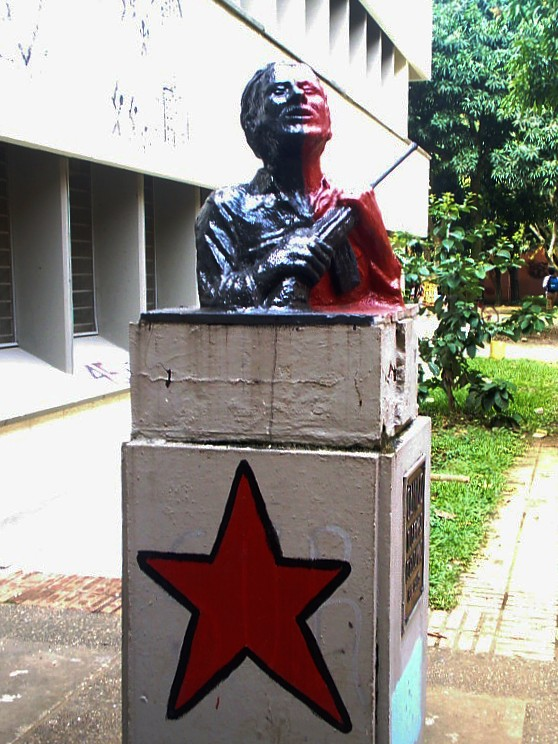
Bust paying homage to Camilo Torres located at the Univerisity of Valle, Cali.

In the guerrilla, Torres was mentored and advised by Jaime Arenas, chosen by Fabio Vásquez, also to keep him away from progressive currents. Shortly before joining the ELN, General Gustavo Rojas Pinilla, leader of the ANAPO, had recommended Torres not to join any guerrilla group, since as a priest he had no experience in handling weapons to confront the army, so he suggested that he continue in political life since he admired his work with the needy classes, something that Torres disregarded considering the advice as a threat. On joining the ELN, under the nom de guerre of Argemiro, the identity of Torres, who was mistaken for a foreigner, was unknown for the moment within the guerrillas, but his identity was later revealed.

As he explained in his "Message to the Christians" published in the first issue of Frente Unido, he realised that the "effective means for the well-being of the majorities ... are not going to be sought by the minorities" and "will not be sought by the privileged minorities in power, because generally these effective means oblige the minorities to sacrifice their privileges", Torres concluded that "it is therefore necessary to take power away from the privileged minorities to give it to the poor majorities" and that "the Revolution is not only permitted but obligatory for Christians who see in it the only effective and ample way of realising love for all". This is how Camilo Torres justified his decision in 1965 to quit his job as a teacher and priest and join the guerrilla, more precisely the National Liberation Army (ELN), although he had previously been interested in joining the Revolutionary Armed Forces of Colombia (FARC) due to his peasant background.

I have left the privileges and duties of the clergy, but I have not ceased to be a priest. I believe that I have given myself up to the Revolution out of love of neighbour. I have stopped saying mass to realise this love of neighbour, in the temporal, economic and social fields. When my neighbour has nothing against me, when I have achieved the Revolution, I will offer mass again, if God allows me to do so. I believe that in this way I follow the command of Christ: "If you bring your offering to the altar and there remember that your brother has something against you, leave your offering there before the altar, and go and be reconciled with your brother first, and then come and present your offering" (Saint Matthew V, 23-24).

— Camilo Torres, "Mensaje a los cristianos", Frente Unido, no. 1, 26/08/1965, Bogotá.

In the ELN, Torres mostly participated as a low-ranking member and provided spiritual and ideological assistance from a Catholic point of view. However, his performance as a guerrilla was poor as he was not used to the arduous training (being assisted by a comrade) and to carrying a rifle, so he was barely given a pistol and was emphasised for his role of spiritual and ideological assistance as well as being a good cook. Torres also served as a doctor for the guerrillas, both physically and "spiritually".

He taught the rural children and translated texts by Mao Zedong, Vladimir Lenin and Fidel Castro. He also organized a "forest church", where he hung a portrait of Castro next to the crucifix. Before his death, he became a leader of the ELN. He also emerged as the "main ideologue of the group". Under his influence, the ELN not only explicitly embraced Catholicism and imbued it with Marxism-Leninism, but also reorganized itself to resemble the structure of the early Catholic Church:

Father Torres became one of the chief ideologues of the ELN, having already been in contact while still in civilian life with the group’s leaders via diverse university student fronts. Father Torres imbued the armed group with further ideological and practical underpinnings that combined Marxism-Leninism with Christian teachings and have, to date, influenced the group’s behaviour and modus operandi. [...] The ELN soon became a sort of federation, not with a topdown control structure but rather a multi-cephalous organisation with a collective decision-making process. The reason behind such a structure was to replicate the arrangement of the early Catholic Church of the I to III centuries AD, with a “synodal” assembly in which to discuss issues at a strategic level and also to allow local churches to selfgovern.

He died in his first combat experience, when the ELN ambushed a patrol of the National Army. The National Army specifically targeted Torres, and he was brutally beaten at the time of his death. It was also revealed that he was shot at a point-blank range. Another report of his death is that he was shot while picking up the weapons of a fallen guerilla comrade. After his death, Camilo Torres became an official martyr of the ELN.

=== Death ===
Torres died on 15 February 1966 in Patio Cemento, after combat with troops of the Fifth Brigade from Bucaramanga, led by Colonel Álvaro Valencia Tovar, who, ironically years earlier, was his childhood friend. The National Army hid the body in a strategic location separate from the other mass graves and the location was not revealed to the public. A symbolic funeral took place in the church of San Diego and a symbolic burial was held. A mass was also held in the grounds of the National University.

Shortly after Torres's death, 'Guitemie' Olivieri, despite being linked to the ELN, was persecuted by the Colombian authorities and was helped by Junior Fajardo and Rita Restrepo de Agudelo to obtain political asylum, first in Panama, then in Mexico, where she married ex-priest Óscar Maldonado, finally in Cuba and then in France.

Years later, Valencia Tovar, now retired as a general, wrote the book El final de Camilo, in which he clarified details of the death of Camilo Torres. According to Valencia Tovar, Torres was buried in a detailed place, and they prepared the procedures to hand over the remains to the family. His older brother, doctor Fernando Torres Restrepo, who lived in the United States, was informed about the fate of his brother.

In addition, General Álvaro Valencia Tovar himself revealed in an interview to the magazine Semana that the body of Camilo Torres was exhumed three years after his burial, his remains were placed in an urn and transported to Bucaramanga where, through the efforts of the general himself, the Military Pantheon of the Fifth Brigade of the National Army was created and the first remains to occupy a place in that pantheon were those of Camilo Torres, although he did not reveal their exact location, leaving the retired general's statements in doubt among the ELN high command.

In January 2016, the President of Colombia, Juan Manuel Santos, instructed the Colombian National Army to begin the process of searching for and exhuming his remains, in a gesture to accelerate the start of the peace talks with the ELN guerrilla group. In 2026, the ELN announced that Torres' body had been found. The Search Unit for Disappeared Persons formally identified the remains as that of Torres on 16 February. President Gustavo Petro subsequently announced that Torres' body would be "respected and laid to rest with honors." A funeral Mass was held and an ossuary was built at the National University to house his remains.

== Political ideology ==
In his early years of political activity, Camilo Torres identified as a progressive Catholic and had denounced the Leninist idea of a vanguard, a view which he later changed, influenced by the Cuban Revolution and Fidel Castro. Additionally, he praised Joseph Stalin and reportedly prayed at his tomb. Despite being labelled a communist, Torres rejected the label for at least the majority of his life, while also declaring that he is not an anti-communist.

Torres advocated for a "new Christianity" where the Catholic Church takes a more active role in the reformation of society. He believed that:

The Church's temporary defects should not scandalize us. The Church is human. What is important is to believe that she is also divine and that if we Christians fulfill our obligation to love our neighbor, we are strengthening the Church.

Torres desired a revolution where poor majorities would seize power from the privileged minorities, believing that:

The Revolution, therefore, is the way to achieve a government that feeds the hungry, clothes the naked, teaches the ignorant, carries out works of charity, of love for one's neighbor, not only occasionally and temporarily, not only for a few, but for the majority of our neighbors. For this reason the Revolution is not only permitted but obligatory for Christians who see in it the only effective and broad way of achieving love for all . It is true that "there is no authority except from God" (St. Paul, Rom. XIII, 1). But St. Thomas says that the concrete attribution of authority is made by the people.

He also believed that, if those minorities did not offer violent resistance, this revolution could be peaceful.

Camilo Torres' political programme was read by Catholic bishop Joseph Blomjous and was found to contain no contradictions to Papal encyclicals.

In September 1965, Torres wrote:

My duty as a priest is to do everything possible to bring people to God, and the most effective way to do this is to ensure that people serve the people according to their conscience. I do not seek to agitate my communist brothers, trying to persuade them to accept Christian teaching and practice church cult. But I demand that all people act according to their conscience.

After his death, Torres' political ideology, known as Camilism, would be adopted by the Montoneros.

== Recognitions and legacy ==
=== Tributes at universities ===
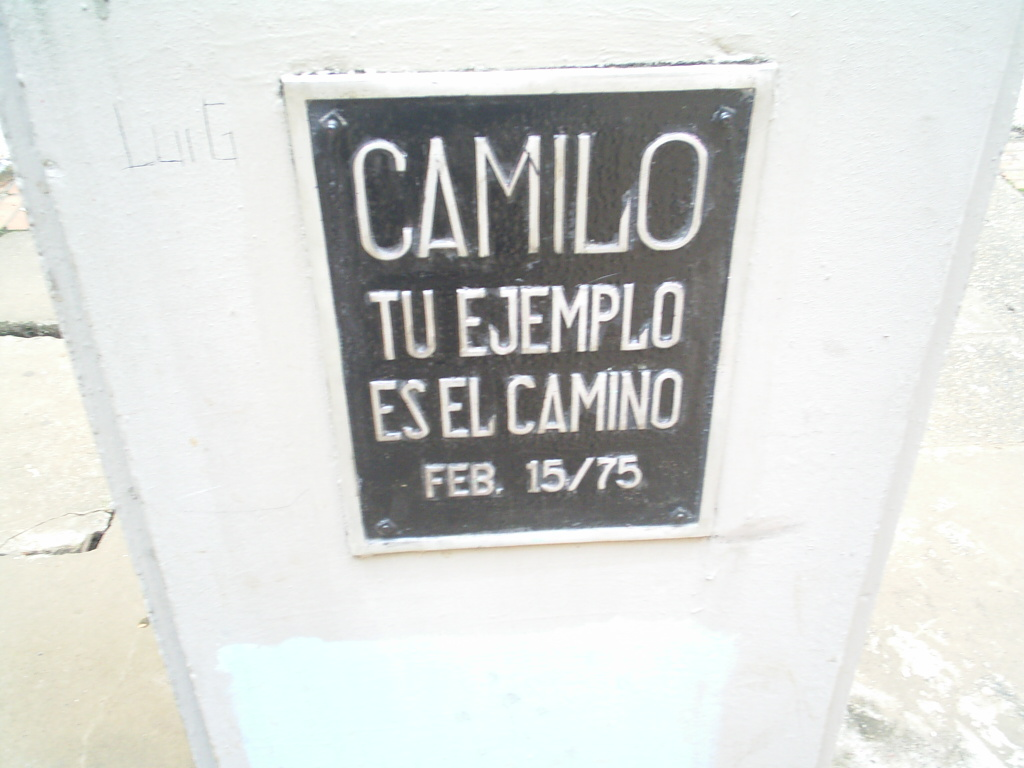
Legend in bust of Camilo Torres at the University of Valle, Cali headquarters

- The main theater of the University of Antioquia bears the name of "Comandante Camilo Torres Restrepo" Popular Theater.
- One of the main buildings of the Industrial University of Santander has the name "Camilo Torres Building", on one of its exterior walls you can see a large mural with his face accompanied by a phrase he wrote.
- At the University of Valle, in the Cali Headquarters, there is a tribute bust, and his face is painted on several university buildings.
- At KU Leuven in Belgium, a large residence student hall has the name of "Camilo Torres".

=== Songs ===
Uruguayan singer-songwriter Daniel Viglietti wrote "Cruz de Luz" in 1967, a song about Camilo Torres, which was popularized by Chilean singer-songwriter Víctor Jara. Also the Cuban singer-songwriter Carlos Puebla wrote a song about Camilo titled "Camilo Torres".

The song "Cura y Guerrillero" from the 1973 album "Testimonios Rebeldes" by the Mexican singer-songwriter José de Molina is dedicated to Camilo Torres and other priests who continue to fight for the same ideals.

=== Tributes in Latin America ===
Camilo Torres Memorial Mosaic

Mural at the Republican School of Santa Librada

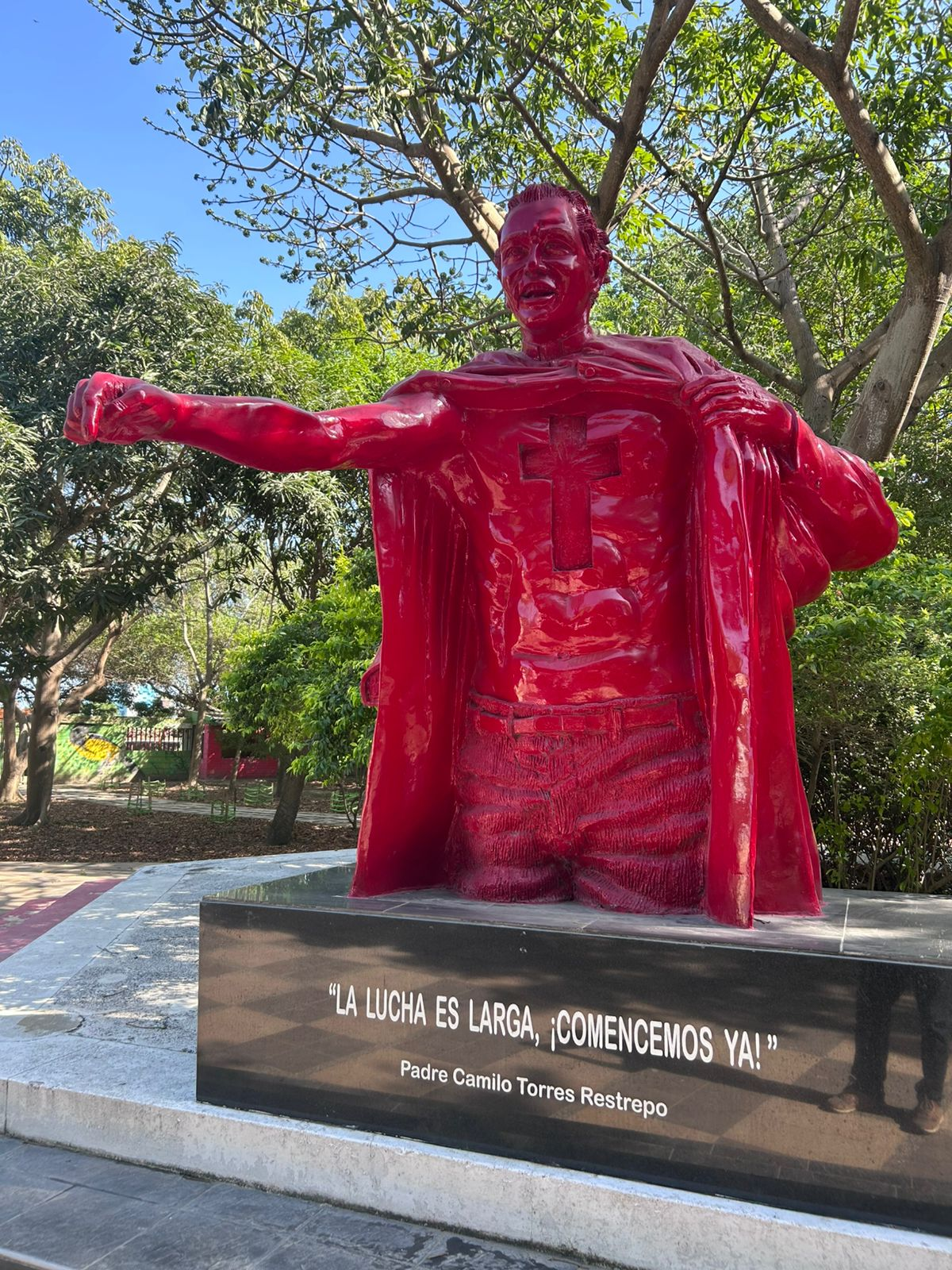
A monument of Camilo Torres Restrepo in Barranquilla.

The ELN was, in 1987, renamed the Camilista Union - National Liberation Army.

The Camilo Torres Muralist Units, close to the Christian Left party of Chile, worked during the military dictatorship of Augusto Pinochet, making murals against the regime, distinguished by their cheerful designs, less abstract than those used by the Ramona Parra Brigade of the Chilean Communist Party.

Fidel Castro was aware of Father Torres and spoke about him, stating that Camilo "is a symbol of the revolutionary unity which should inspire the movement of the peoples in Latin America."

== See also ==
- José Antonio Jiménez Comín
- Domingo Lain
- Manuel Perez
- James Carney
- Christian communism
- Catholic communism
- Catholicism and socialism
- Catholic worker movement
- Catholic social teaching
