= Domingo Laín =

Domingo Lain

Orders
- Ordination: 1965 by Pope Paul VI

Personal details
- Died: February 20, 1974 Mountains of Colombia
- Denomination: Roman Catholic church (Latin Church)
- Occupation: Priest; ELN Guerilla

Domingo Laín Sáenz (Paniza, Zaragoza; 1940 – Mountains of Colombia; March 22, 1974) was a Spanish priest and ELN guerilla.

== Biography ==
In 1951, at the age of 11, the young Lain entered a minor seminary, where he eventually met Manuel Perez (who would much later become the leader of the ELN) and Jose Antonio Jimenez Comin in 1955. They became friends. In 1959, they entered the major seminary and they were ordained priests in 1965.

In October 1968, José Antonio and Manuel, expelled from the Dominican Republic, arrived and joined Domingo in the Ciénaga de la Virgen neighborhood of Cartagena. They participated in the "Golconda group", which was aligned with the political ideology of Catholic revolutionary Camilo Torres Restrepo.

They were eventually expelled from Colombia, but travelled to France, contacted the ELN in Madrid, and returned in 1969 with fake passports.

In 1970, they joined the National Liberation Army, and 4 years later, Lain fell in combat.

== See also ==
- Catholic communism
