= José Antonio Jiménez Comín =

Jose Antonio Jimenez Comin

Orders
- Ordination: 1965 by Pope Paul VI

Personal details
- Denomination: Catholic Church (Latin Church)
- Occupation: Priest; ELN Guerilla

José Antonio Jiménez Comín ( Ariño, Teruel, Spain 1935- Yondó , Antioquia, Colombia, 1971) was a Spanish priest and ELN guerilla.

== Biography ==
Jose Antonio worked in the mining offices of Ariño, in a rural setting in the 1950s. In 1951, at the age of 16, he entered the minor seminary of Alcorisa (Teruel). In 1955, he met Domingo Laín and Manuel Pérez . Together, in 1959, they went to the major seminary of Zaragoza to study philosophy. In 1965, all three were ordained priests by Pope Paul VI. José Antonio began his pastoral work in the working-class neighborhoods of the Aragonese capital. The three priests traveled to France that same year, where they continued their priesthood alongside Spanish immigrant workers and war refugees. José Antonio was in formation at the Hispanic-American Seminary of Madrid, focused on evangelization as part of a mission abroad, going to the Dominican Republic.

In October 1968, José Antonio and Manuel Pérez were expelled from the Dominican Republic and met up with Domingo in the municipality of Ciénaga de la Virgen, in Cartagena. Due to the extreme poverty of the population, they clandestinely followed and participated in the "Golconda group", which adhered to the ideas of Camilo Torres Restrepo. The Golconda group was created by the leftist priests of Colombia. Expelled from Colombia for political participation and conflict with the Church, he contacted the ELN in Madrid and in 1969 traveled to the Canary Islands with a false passport to reach Colombia. José Antonio joined the ranks of the ELN in 1970 and took up arms. He died a year after joining the guerrillas during a grueling march in the mountains of Colombia.
