= Fabio Vásquez Castaño =

Colombian rebel and revolutionary (1940–2019)

Fabio Vásquez Castaño (1940 – 10 December 2019) was a Colombian rebel and revolutionary who was trained by the Fidel Castro government during the 1960s. He was born in Calarcá, Quindío, and was one of the original founders of the Colombian guerrilla group ELN. The ELN movement began in 1964 when a group of students, inspired by Che Guevara and led by Fabio Vásquez, returned from their training in Cuba.

Vázquez Castaño died on 10 December 2019 in Havana at the age of 79.

Following the death of Vásquez, the ELN was led by a series of priests and former priests like Camilo Torres Restrepo and Manuel Perez until the emergence of its present leader, Antonio García.
