= Darío Botero =

Colombian writer, thinker and educator

Darío Botero Uribe
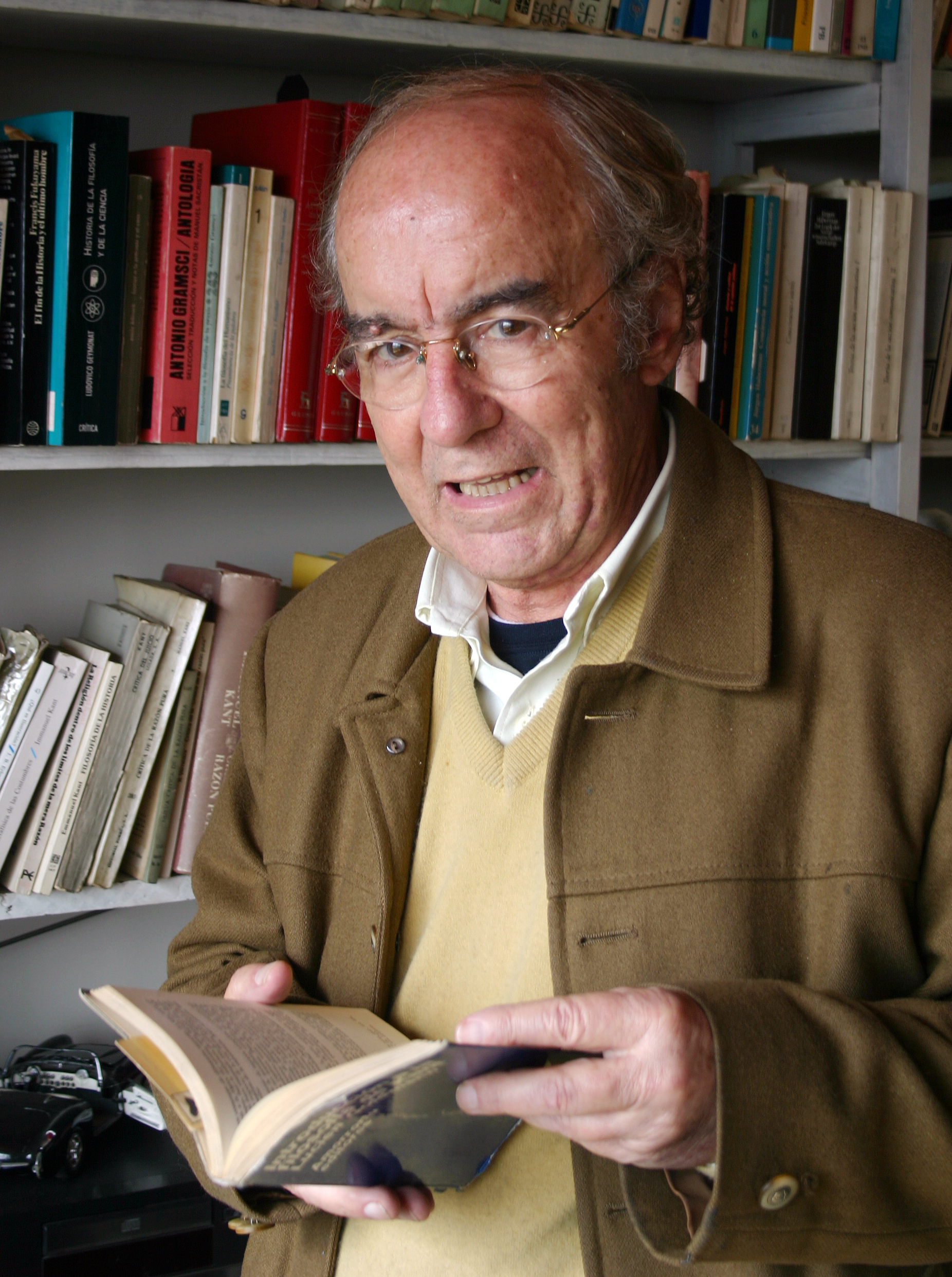
- Born: Darío Botero Uribe; July , 1938; Calarcá, Quindío, Colombia
- Died: June 21, 2010 (aged 71)
- Occupations: Philosopher; Professor
- Known for: His career as a professor, philosopher and contributions to Colombian and universal philosophy.

Darío Botero Uribe (July 1938 – June 21, 2010) was a Colombian writer, thinker, professor emeritus and teacher at the National University of Colombia; he received a Doctorate degree from the National University with the title of Master. He studied law, political science and philosophy at the same university, where he held the position of Dean of the Faculty of Law, Political and Social Sciences (1986-1988). He developed an original philosophical project that he called Cosmic Vitalism. He was vitalist and utopian. He contributed to Colombian and Latin American thought.

== Biography ==
=== Early years ===
Botero was born in Calarcá, Quindío, Colombia. He studied law, Political Sciences-Master's course-at the National University of Colombia.

In 1960, he participated with other Colombian intellectuals and professionals, including Camilo Torres, Orlando Fals Borda, Eduardo Umaña Luna, María Cristina Salazar, Virginia Gutiérrez de Pineda, Carlos Escalante, and Tomás Ducay, in the foundation of the first Faculty of Sociology in Latin America. at the National University of Colombia.

=== International professional career ===
He participated in the Postgraduate Kolloquium with Professor Jürgen Habermas, at the Johann Wolfgang Goethe University in Frankfurt, Federal Republic of Germany in 1983 and 1984.

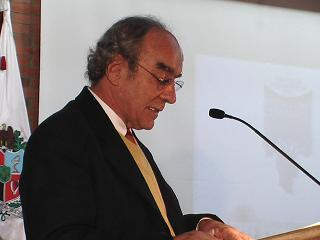
For the first time, a Colombian philosopher proposes from Latin America to the world, a thought that promotes the defense of life, seeking a mental balance that allows creating men and women with the capacity to critically assume history, culture and defense of our own identity. This proposal is called Cosmic Vitalism.

Botero was a philosopher of culture, social life and law, who frequently gave seminars and conferences on philosophical, cultural and political topics. He was the founder and director of Politeia magazine, of which he edited 29 issues. The magazine featured essays by novelist Rafael Humberto Moreno Durán, philosopher Iván Soll, professor Mario Bettati, Germán Andrés Molina Garrido, Jesús Martín Barbero, among other renowned authors in Latin America and the world.

He was also founder and director of Planeta Sur magazine, with 3 editions. He published more than 15 books and numerous essays on the subjects of his specialty.

Botero was founder and member of the board of directors of the Colombian Association of Philosophy of law and Social Philosophy. He was also a speaker at scientific and philosophical seminars at the main universities in Colombia and some in Latin America.

=== Cosmic Vitalism ===
At the end of his life, he developed an original philosophical project that he called Cosmic Vitalism, which seeks to think about the world from a Latin American perspective. Cosmic Vitalism posits life as the three-dimensional concept: cosmic life, biological life, and psychosocial life. In this way, the concept of life and its projection in cultural and social praxis are enriched.

After a general theoretical development and an examination of the great conceptions of nature, he concludes with an environmental theory that seeks to discipline citizen behavior towards nature and outlines a concrete humanism based on transnature and not anthropology, as a response to the critics of the humanism of Martin Heidegger and Michel Foucault.

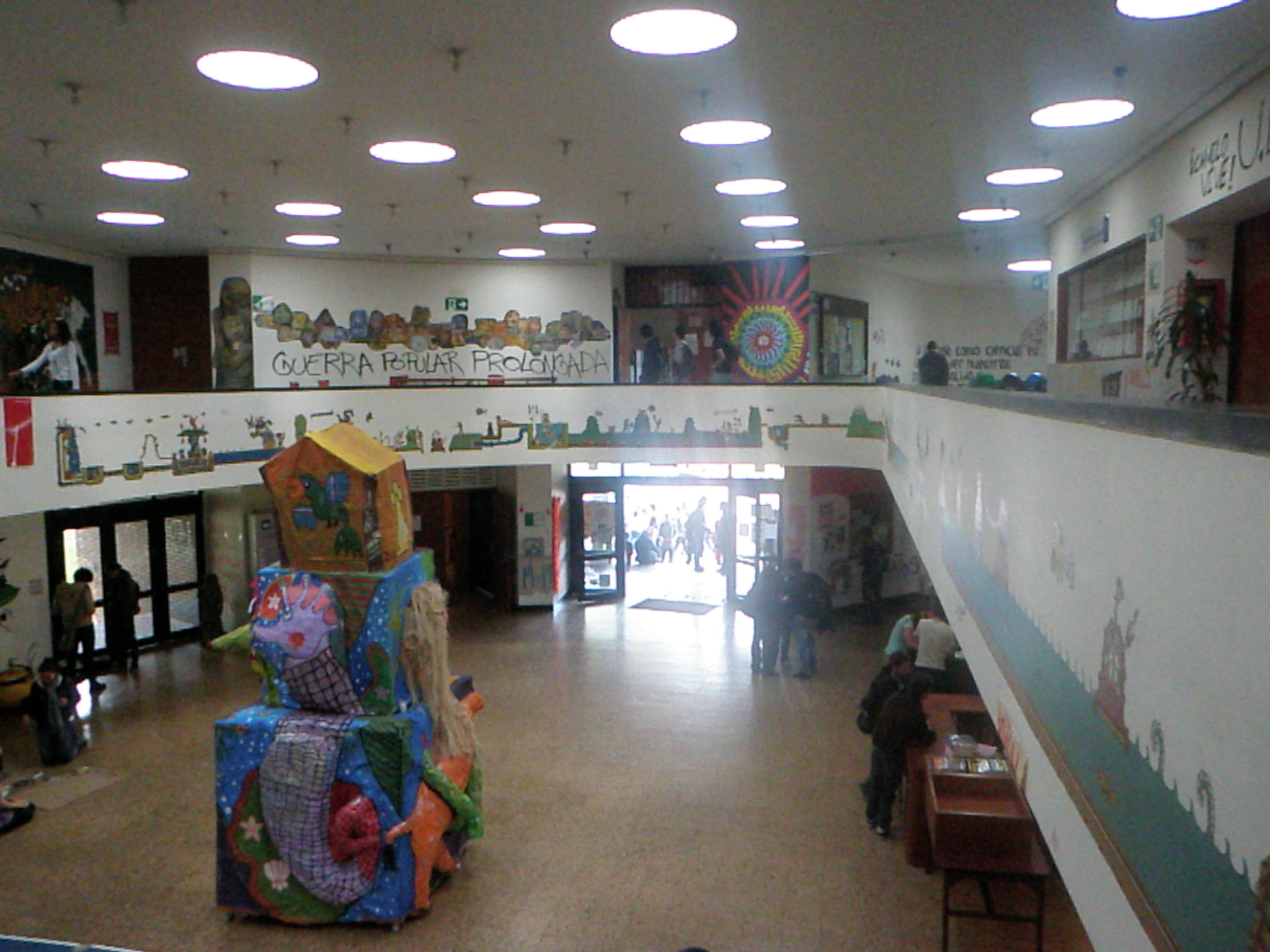
Orlando Fals Borda Building - Faculty of Sociology of the National University of Colombia. Darío Botero was one of the co-founders of this faculty, the first of sociology in Latin America.

== Publications ==
- El Estado y la cultura en la Grecia Antigua (1975). Published by the Faculty of Law of the National University of Colombia. Editor: Fabio Barrera Téllez. Maps by Mauricio Cortés.
- El Estado y la cultura en la Grecia Antigua (1979). Reissue of the Tercer Mundo bookstore. Bogotá.
- Unidimensional racional a la pluridimensionalidad humana (1991)
- La voluntad de poder de Nietzsche (1992)
- La razón política: Crítica de los fundamentos filosóficos del pensamiento político moderno (1994)
- El derecho a la utopía (1994)
- El poder de la filosofía y la filosofía del poder (1996)
- Por qué escribo? (1998)
- Manifiesto del pensamiento latinoamericano (1999)
- Filosofía Vitalista (2000)
- Vida, ética y democracia (2001)
- Vitalismo Cósmico (2002)
- Pensar de nuevo el mundo: aforismos (2004)
- Martin Heidegger: la filosofía del regreso a casa (2004)
- Discurso sobre el humanismo (2004)
- Si la naturaleza es sabia el hombre no lo es (2005)
- Teoría social del derecho (2005)
- Discurso de la no-razón (2006)
- La comunidad política vitalista (2008)
- La concepción ambiental de la vida (2009)

== See also ==
- Vitalism (Jainism)
- Utopia
