= United Front (Colombia) =

United Front of the People Frente Unido del Pueblo
- Leader: Camilo Torres Restrepo
- Founder: Camilo Torres Restrepo
- Founded: August 1965
- Dissolved: September 1965
- Newspaper: United Front
- Ideology: Big tent; Anti-National Front; Catholic socialism; Left-wing nationalism; Liberation theology; Revolutionary socialism; Camilism; Factions: Communism; Christian democracy
- Political position: Far-left
- Religion: Catholicism
- National affiliation: NML; Alianza Nacional Popular (ANAPO); Communist Party of Colombia

The United Front of the People or Frente Unido del Pueblo, was a socialist political coalition founded in 1965 by Colombian Catholic Priest Camilo Torres Restrepo, in order to oppose the National Front regime.

== History ==
The United Front was founded by Camilo Torres Restrepo in early 1965 with the intention of creating a popular coalition of opposition parties. Torres presented the manifesto of his party on 22 May 1965 at a student rally, which was then criticized by Torres' superior, cardinal Luis Concha Córdoba, for calling for a violent revolution. In response, Torres requested his laicization on 24 June 1965, which was granted by Concha on 24 June.

After laicization, Torres devoted himself to building up support for the United Front and expanding its party ranks. Throughout 1965, he travelled the entire country and gave speeches to rally support for his cause; he set up local groups of supporters which he called "comandos" to reflect the revolutionary character of the United Front. Torres also set up the organization's weekly newspaper Frente Unido, where he regularly published articles describing his stances on various political issues. His articles were frequently addressed to a specific group whose support he sought - the newspaper published articles written by Torres entitled "Message to Christians", "Message to Communists", "Message to the Military" as well as to "The Nonaligned", "The Trade Unions", "Peasants", "Women", "Students", "The Unemployed" and to "Political Prisoners".

The official mission of the United Front was to unify "all Colombians not aligned with the traditional political parties". Torres sought the cooperation of the Colombian Communist Party as well, and went as far as stating that he is willing to accept assistance from Fidel Castro for "the Colombian Revolution". At the same time, Torres stressed that the United Front would be led by Christians first and foremost, and argued that only a revolution with "permanent Christian values" could succeed. The United Front was also supported by the youth organisation of the Colombian Conservative Party, and Torres' message was particularly popular amongst Christian trade unions.

To promote the United Front, Torres gave speeches and organized rallies in major cities of Colombia, which were reported to have drawn large crowds. It was estimated that his rallies were attended by about 2,5 million Colombians. At the height of his popularity in summer 1965, it was widely speculated that Torres would be a presidential candidate for the next election, and the Colombian government considered Torres a serious possible candidate. The National Front also considered allowing the United Front to gain a minority of the seats in the Chamber of Representatives of Colombia. However, Torres' message grew increasingly radicalized, and he rejected participating in the elections, believing that "the elections are more made in the office of the oligarch government than on the voting tables". Instead, Torres stated that the goal of the United Front was "to unify and to organize the popular class for the definite assault for power".

Torres hoped that the United Front would unite various social groups of Colombia under a common cause and form a massive force of opposition to the National Front. However, his hopes were dashed by infighting and divisions within the movement that worsened over the course of 1965. The leadership of the United Front was divided over the question of the participation of the Colombian Communist Party in the movement. Another dispute also concerned the question of whether the United Front would contest the 1966 Colombian parliamentary election and the 1966 Colombian presidential election. The movement's newspaper Frente Unido struggled with declining sales over time, and Torres grew increasingly frustrated, which he expressed in his "Message to the United Front of the People", where he admitted that the organization of his movement was "not as extensive or disciplined as we had hoped".

The situation of the movement declined further as Torres' views increasingly shifted towards Marxism-Leninism. While in October 1965 the United Front still called itself "neither Communist nor Christian democratic", by late November 1965 the United Front was being abandoned en masse by Christian Democrats, who argued that the movement had been absorbed by communist and far-left groups. Torres called Colombia "a beggar state which is dependent upon crumbs which the North Americans might wish to give." He also referred to Colombia as a "dependent republic" that was "obeying the North Americans in order to destroy, with blood and fire, the other republics of independent Colombians." Eventually, Torres "incited the workers to seize the factories and the peasants to take possession of the land".

The radicalized message also prompted the government to attempt to suppress the United Front. Violent clashes with the police became common at the rallies, and Torres himself became subject to discrimination and harassment by the government. He was closely invigilated by the police, and on numerous occasions his rallies were suddenly banned. Eventually, Torres was refused passage by a commercial airline, which forced to travel on a plane chartered by his labor supporters. Torres was also detained by the police at least once, and it was later reported that he was "beaten up by the police and local authorities".

By the end 1965, Torres decided that a meaningful change within parliamentary means was impossible, and joined the National Liberation Army (ELN), a Marxist-Leninist organization that was participating in armed resistance against the Colombian government. At this time, Torres published his two final declarations on the behalf of United Front - "Message to the Oligarchy", bitterly condemning the Colombian government for ignoring the demands for structural change in Colombia, as well as "Message to Colombians from the Mountains", where Torres announced his decision to resort to guerilla warfare. Torres' choice of the organization was motivated by the fact that the ELN was based on Castroism and did not adhere to either the Soviet or Chinese political line. Founded in 1964, the ELN took an independent Marxist stance and did not adhere to atheism, and instead described itself as a "Catholic radical" movement.

By the beginning of 1966, Torres emerged as the leader of the National Liberation Army and oriented the movement towards liberation theology. In February 1966, Torres was killed in battle; there is evidence that he was specifically targeted and brutally beaten at the time of his death. Torres became a martyr for a wide spectrum of leftist movements worldwide, and was honoured by communist leaders such as Fidel Castro, who stated that Camilo Torres "is a symbol of the revolutionary unity which should inspire the movement of the peoples of Latin America".

== Ideology ==
The ideology of the movement was defined by its founder Camilo Torres, and changed over time as Torres drifted closer to Marxism-Leninism. In 1964, shortly before forming the United Front, Torres called for a catalogue of reformist and developmentalist programs to improve the socioeconomic situation; his views from back then were considered "liberal-socialist." However, by 1965, Torres concluded "that only profound social, political and economic change, rather than gradual reform and development, could provide the solution to Colombia's problems."

As a result, the manifesto of the United Front called for "a type of socialist state and the liberation of Colombia from North American imperialism". The movement's manifesto was heavily religious and made constant references to Catholics and drew on Torres' liberation theology. The United Front declared that the Kingdom of God is not "otherworldly", but must rather be established on this world. This Kingdom of God was to be established by the Colombian workers through their participation in "the struggle for revolutionary change". Torres wrote: "We should lead people to love, with that love manifest in surrender of self, we should preach the gospel; we should celebrate external rites - Eucharist and sacraments."

The movement was described as highly utopian in nature, and Torres equated the establishment of the Kingdom of God with the implementation of the United Front's manifesto. The movement called for a socialist revolution, stating that "revolution is the way to obtain a government that will feed the hungry, clothe the naked and teach the unschooled. Revolution will produce a government that carries out works of charity, of love for one's fellows". United Front believed that the economy of Colombia was "occupied" by the forces of imperialism, and argued that this occupation could be only be ended with an implementation of a "radical socialist" program. The economic demands of the movement were based on the socialist agrarian reforms in Cuba.

The manifesto of the United Front was almost wholly the work of Camilo Torres and proposed a utopian socialist state, with its policies based on those implemented by Castro and Guevara in Cuba. Torres believed that represented "what the popular classes really wanted despite their traditional allegiances to different political parties." Torres openly admitted that the United Front is socialist:

The platform [manifesto] of struggle of the United Front of the People can be realised only after the people have taken power. Its only novelty consists in its seeking the common points of the revolution without entering into religious or party differences. It can be accepted by Catholics and non-Catholics, by poor Liberals and poor Conservatives, by the revolutionary elements of the NML, the Communist, ANAPO, and Christian Democratic parties, and especially by the revolutionary elements of the non-aligned in these groups. However, it is necessary to explain that this platform leans toward the establishment of a socialist state, that is, "socialist" understood only in a technical and positive sense, not in the ideological sense. We offer practical, not theoretical, socialism.

The movement also promoted a revolutionary, anti-imperialist form of nationalism. The United Front condemned the close links of the ruling elite of Colombia with "foreign interests to which it is bound", naming the United States as a colonial power that had established a relationship of economic dependence with Colombia. United Front stated that the national independence and socioeconomic development of Colombia is impossible without a revolution, as these goals go against the United States' plan to keep Colombia economically dependent. It argued:

Even if it wanted to, our oligarchy could not industrialise Colombia. Its North American partners would not allow it. We all know that our economy is dependent on the coffee we sell primarily to the United States and on the "aid" which this same United States gives us. We all know that ours is a beggar's state which is dependent on the crumbs that the Americans feel like giving us. What interests the United States is to have countries which supply it with raw materials at low prices and which purchase from it at high prices all the products of its industry which we need. The United States controls our economy, and our oligarchy is very happy to be its agent and servant here. Not one step back. Down with Yankee imperialism. Long live the revolution. Away with the oligarchies. Power for the people, until death.

Specific demands of the movement included an agrarian reform which would ensure that "the land will belong to the one who directly farms it." In the spirit of the Cuban reforms, United Front adds that "no land will be purchased. What is considered necessary for the common good of the people will be expropriated without compensation." Another demand was also an urban reform that would abolish landlords and ensure that "all the inhabitants of the houses in the cities and towns will become owners of the houses in which they live". The movement also demanded redistribution of wealth from the richest to the poorest through taxes and confiscations, as well as a comprehensive program of nationalization to make the Colombian industries state-owned. United Front also promised "an integral and progressive programme of social security to guarantee to the population the right to health and medical care" as well maintaining the Colombian military, but "without excessive siphoning off of the funds necessary for the health and education of Colombians".

The movement envisioned a broad coalition of many social groups and political movements. It argued: "our common goals: against the oligarchy and United States domination; for the winning of power by the people". The movement appealed to Catholics and Communists specifically, but also stated that it sought to work "with all independent revolutionaries and revolutionaries of other convictions". A specific proposal of the United Front was for Catholics and Communists to unite together for the common cause:

Why do we Catholics fight the communists - the people with whom it is said we have most antagonism - over the question of whether the soul is mortal or is immortal instead of agreeing that hunger is indeed mortal? Certainly, we Catholics who ourselves want the church to be poor are not going to fight with those who are against a rich church.

Over time, the United Front became increasingly radical and socialist-oriented as Torres' views drifted closer to Marxism-Leninism. By late summer 1965, the United Front rejected the participation in bourgeois elections, writing that it would be futile:

We must not allow ourselves to be misled by the myth of elections, unless the popular class controls the electoral system, presents a programme of fundamental change of the institutions, breaks up the present political power system so that the majority constitutes the main pressure group and determines the policy and makes the decisions of the government.

Shortly before its dissolution, the United Front called for a violent revolution that would install a socialist state in Colombia. Torres argued that the Catholic Church's doctrine of just war provided the moral justification for violent revolution:

The followers [of the United Front], when planning the take-over of political power necessarily have to make a tactical decision - to follow through to the ultimate consequences and use whatever means the oligarchy leaves open to seize power. This attitude has no great ideological consequences because the church itself has established the conditions for a just war. Violence is not excluded from the Christian ethic, because if Christianity is concerned with eliminating the serious evils which we suffer and with saving us from the continuous violence in which we live without possible solution, the ethic is to be violent once and for all in order to destroy the violence which the economic minorities exercise against the people.
