= Manuel Pérez (guerrilla leader) =

Spanish Catholic communist (1943–1998)

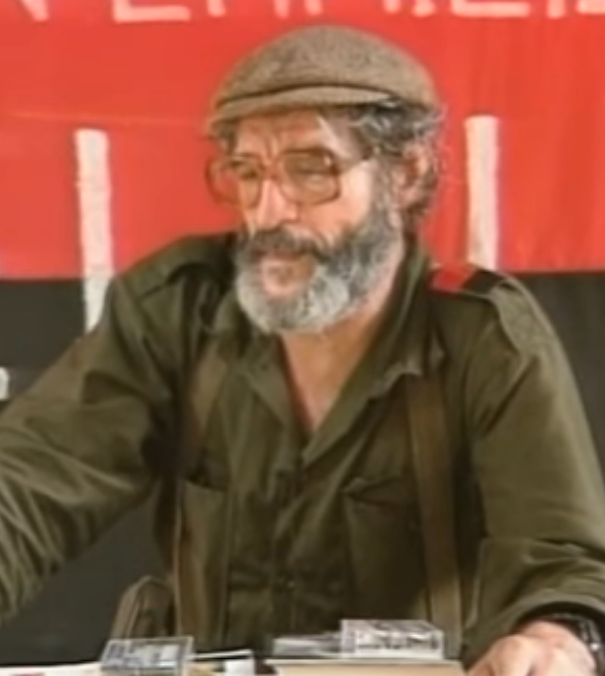
- Pérez in 1997

Commander of the National Liberation Army
- In office 19 October 1973 – 14 February 1998

Personal details
- Born: Gregorio Manuel Pérez Martínez; 9 May 1943 Alfamén, Spain
- Died: 14 February 1998 (aged 54) Colombia

Manuel Pérez Martínez (9 May 1943 – 14 February 1998), also known as "El Cura Pérez" ("Pérez the Priest"), was a Spanish Catholic communist and Marxist-Leninist revolutionary and the leader of the Colombian National Liberation Army (ELN) for over three decades. The ELN was the second-largest rebel group in Colombia at that time.

== Biography ==
Born in Alfamén, Spain, Pérez was originally a Catholic priest, and worked in Spain, France, Haiti, and the Dominican Republic. An admirer of Camilo Torres Restrepo, following his defrocking and expulsion from the Dominican Republic in 1968, he went to Colombia and joined the ELN in 1969. He became the group's leader some time in the 1970s and remained so until his death at age 54 in 1998 from hepatitis B. His leadership is thought to have significantly affected the ELN's ideology (Cuban-style Marxism, Catholicism and liberation theology). He was also instrumental in increasing the ELN's size from less than 100 to more than 5,000.

== Personal life ==
Perez identified as a Christian and had origins in the Catholic priesthood but, during his time in the guerilla movement, he did not wish to be addressed as "priest."

Perez also praised Pablo Escobar, stating that:

What did I feel when Pablo Escobar died? On the one hand, he was a drug trafficker, but on the other hand, he remained true to his principles. He said he defended nationalism and he stood by that; he was able to keep his word. He said he preferred death in Colombia to prison in the United States, and he was true to his word. He knew he was going to be extradited, so he got himself killed first. I believe Pablo Escobar was taking steps to confront the oligarchy and had anti-imperialist traits, even though he was a drug trafficker. We, who are against drug trafficking, have to recognise that Pablo Escobar had that status. From that point of view, it hurt me that he died because of an alliance of double standards and as vulgar as the one they made to kill him. And it hurt me that a person who was showing signs of national, anti-imperialist struggle died. I was not saddened by his death as a drug trafficker.

He also stated:

Yes, I think it was a true reflection of what Pablo Escobar had been, a Colombian Robin Hood, a vigilante, and at the same time generous to the population. He gave selflessly to many people. He built sports facilities for young people, housing, recreation centres, made donations... in other words, he did many things that the Catholic Church would call charitable. Father García Herreros, who as a priest approached Pablo Escobar, said that he was there to save his soul, but in reality he was there to collect the donations that Pablo Escobar made. In that sense, it can be said that the support Pablo Escobar received at his funeral expressed gratitude despite everything.

In 1989, Perez was, and later the entirety of the ELN were, excommunicated, after the ELN murdered the bishop of Arauca, Jesus Emilio Jaramillo.

== See also ==
- Domingo Lain
- Jose Antonio Jimenez Comin
