= Orlando Fals Borda =

Colombian researcher and sociologist (1925–2008)

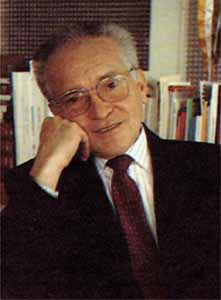
- Born: 11 July 1925
- Died: 12 August 2008 (aged 83)
- Occupations: Researcher, sociologist

Orlando Fals Borda (Barranquilla, 11 July 1925 - Bogotá, 12 August 2008) was a Colombian researcher and sociologist, one of the most important Latin American thinkers, and one of the founders of participatory action research.

Together with Father Camilo Torres Restrepo and other intellectuals and professionals, including Eduardo Umaña Luna, María Cristina Salazar, Virginia Gutiérrez de Pineda, Carlos Escalante, Darío Botero and Tomás Ducay, in 1959 he set up one of the first sociology faculty in Latin America at the National University of Colombia.

His perspective built a singular bond between science and politics that changed dramatically the relations between society and knowledge. He also played a key role of the foundation of CLACSO (Latin American Council of Social Sciences) at the end of the sixties. An essential part of his effort was centered on the construction of a perspective from the border and the periphery, focused on the subordination conditions of the Latin American societies. A polemic thinker and militant, Fals Borda developed an ethical conception of the subversion based on a particular method of analysis and a praxis called "positive subversion" through the idea of commitment. Fals Borda's perspective also contributed to develop some recent critical interpretations, such as postcolonialism linked to the analysis of the effects of modernity/coloniality on the South.

== Quotations ==
- "Do not monopolise your knowledge nor impose arrogantly your technique, but respect and combine your skills with the knowledge of the researched or /grassroots communities, taking them as full partners and co-researchers. Do not trust elitist versions of history and science which respond to dominant interests, but be receptive to counter-narratives and try to recapture them. Do not depend solely on your culture to interpret facts, but recover local values, traits, beliefs, and arts for action by and with the research organisations. Do not impose your own ponderous scientific style for communicating results, but diffuse and share what you have learned together with the people, in a manner that is wholly understandable and even literary and pleasant, for science should not be necessarily a mystery nor a monopoly of experts and intellectuals."

== Works ==
- La Violencia en Colombia (1962), with Eduardo Umaña and Father Germán Guzmán
- Ante la Crisis del País (2003) (memoirs)
- La comunicación de las ideas entre los campesinos colombianos, Bogotá, Universidad Nacional. (Con Paul J. Deutschmann). 1962.
- "Desarrollo y perspectivas de la Sociología Rural en Colombia y América Latina", en Memoria del primer Congreso Nacional de Sociología, Bogotá, Asociación Colombiana de Sociología - Editorial Iqueima, pp. 153–172. 1963.
- El Brasil: Campesinos y Vivienda, Bogotá, Imprenta Nacional. 1963.
- "Pautas conservadoras en el salto a propietario", en Centre National de Recherche Scientifique, Les problemes agraires des Amériques Latines, París, CNRS. 1965.
- "Violence and the break-up of tradition in Colombia", en Claudio Veliz (Ed.), Obstacles to change in Latin America, London, Oxford University Press. pp. 188–205. 1965.
- La subversión en Colombia: Visión del cambio social en la historia, Bogotá, Universidad Nacional - Tercer Mundo. 1967. (La segunda edición revisada se publicó por Tercer Mundo en 1968 bajo el título de Subversión y Cambio Social). Traducción al inglés: Subversion and Social Change in Colombia, New York - London, Columbia University Press (trad. por Jacqueline D. Skiles), 1969.
- "Ciencia y Compromiso", en ECO Revista de la Cultura de Occidente, Tomo XVI/2, No. 92, Bogotá, Diciembre 1967, pp. 181–200.
- "Pour une analyse socio-politique engagée en Amérique Latine", en Institut de Sociologie, Université Libre de Bruxelles, Bruselas. p. 70–90.
- Las revoluciones inconclusas en América Latina: 1809-1968, México, Siglo XXI, 1968. (Hay nueve ediciones). Traducida al francés por Jacques Senelier y Raoul Edgar-Rosa como Révolutions inachevées en Amérique Latine, Paris, Desclée de Brouver, 1972.
- "Revoluciones inconclusas en América Latina", en Revista Mexicana de Sociología, vol. 30, No. 3, México, pp. 603–620. 1968. (Es una edición parcial del anterior).
- "From marginal to significant change in Latin America", Serie de conferencias dictadas en Inglaterra: Universidades de Oxford y Londres. 1969.
- Ciencia propia y colonialismo intelectual, México, Nuestro Tiempo. 1970. (Cinco ediciones: 1981, Bogotá, Punta de Lanza y Carlos Valencia Editores).
- "Marginality and Revolution in Latin America, 1809-1969", en Studies in Comparative International Development, Vol. VI, No. 4. New Brunswick. 1970.
- "Commentary to K. Silvert", en Stanley R. Ross (Ed.), Latin America in Transition, Albany, State University of New York Press. 1970.
- Subversión y Desarrollo: El caso de América Latina, XI Conferencia Anual del Foyer John Knox, 19 de Junio de 1970, Ginebra, Suiza. (También en francés e inglés).
- Cooperatives and Rural Development in Latin America, Ginebra, UNRISD. 1971.
- "La educación en el proceso revolucionario", en Por ahí es la cosa: educación en Colombia. (Con Gonzalo Castillo Cárdenas, Víctor Daniel Bonilla, Carlos Duplat y Augusto Libreros). Bogotá, La Rosca. 1971. (Tres ediciones, 1980).
- El reformismo por dentro en América Latina, México, Siglo XXI. 1972. (2a. edición 1974).
- Causa Popular, Ciencia Popular (con Víctor Daniel Bonilla, Gonzalo Castillo Cárdenas y Augusto Libreros), Bogotá, La Rosca. 1972.
- Reflexiones sobre la aplicación del método de estudio-acción en Colombia, Asunción, Centro Paraguayo de Estudios Sociológicos. 1973.
- Historia de la cuestión agraria en Colombia, Bogotá, Punta de Lanza. 1975.
- Rural Cooperatives As Agents of Change (con otros autores), Ginebra, UNRISD. 1975. (También en español, 1977, Bogotá, Punta de Lanza).
- Capitalismo, hacienda y poblamiento en la Costa Atlántica Bogotá, Punta de Lanza. 1976.
- "Por la praxis: el problema de cómo investigar la realidad para transformarla", en Simposio Mundial de Cartagena, Crítica y política en ciencias sociales, Bogotá, Punta de Lanza-Universidad de Los Andes, Vol. I, pp. 209–249. 1978. (También en alemán, en H. Moser y H. Ornaner, eds., Internationale Aspekte der Aktionsforschung, Munich, Kösel, 1978; en inglés, en Dialectical Anthropology, Amsterdam, No. 4, 1979, pp. 33–35; en italiano, en Quaderni EDA, No. 2, 1982, Romaen portugués, en Servico Social e Sociedade, No. 11, São Paulo, Cortez).
- "Negación y promesa de la sociología", en Revista de Sociología, Medellín, Pontificia Universidad Bolivariana. Año 8, Vol. IX, No. 13, enero-diciembre 1978, pp. 63–71. (También en inglés, Social Science Research Review; en farsi, Iranian Institute for Peasant and Rural Studies, Teherán, 1979).
- El problema de cómo investigar la realidad para transformarla, Bogotá, Tercer Mundo, 1979. (2a. edición, 1983; 3a. edición, 1986).
- "El secreto de la acumulación originaria de capital: una aproximación empírica", en Revista de la Universidad Nacional de Colombia, No. 7, Medellín, pp. 28–39. 1979. (También en Estudios Sociales Centroamericanos, Vol. VII, No. 20, San José de Costa Rica, pp. 155–175).
- Mompox y Loba: Historia doble de la Costa, Bogotá, Carlos Valencia Editores, 1979.
- "La ciencia y el pueblo: nuevas reflexiones sobre la investigación-acción", en Asociación Colombiana de Sociología, La sociología en Colombia: balance y perspectivas, Memoria del Tercer Congreso Nacional de Sociología, Bogotá, 20–22 de agosto, 1980, pp. 149–174.
- "Die Bedeutung der Sozialwissenschaft und die Praktische Produktion von Wissen in der Dritten Welt (Aktionsforschung)", en Revista Austriaca de Ciencia Política, no. 2, Viena, enero 1981. pp. 201–214.
- El Presidente Nieto: Historia doble de la Costa (Tomo 2o.). Bogotá, Carlos Valencia Editores. 1981.
- "Aspectos teóricos da pesquisa participante", en Carlos R. Brandao (ed.), Pesquisa Participante, São Paulo, Brasiliense. 1981.
- Investigación participativa y praxis rural (con otros). Lima, Mosca Azul. 1981.
- "The Challenge of Action Research", en Development: Seeds of Change, no. 1. Roma. 1981. pp. 55–61.
- "Science and the Common People", en The Journal of Social Studies, No. 11, Dacca, Bangladesh, 1981. pp. 1–21.
- Resistencia en el San Jorge: Historia doble de la Costa. (Tomo 3o). Bogotá, Carlos Valencia Editores. 1984.
- "Marxian Categories and Colombian Realities", en Diptendra Banerjee (ed.), Marxian Theory and the Third World, New Delhi, SAGE Publications, India. 1985.
- Retorno a la tierra: Historia doble de la Costa (Tomo 4o.), Bogotá, Carlos Valencia Editores, 1986.
- The Challenge of Social Change, ed., Londres, SAGE Series of International Sociology. 1986. (También traducido al japonés, 1987).
- Conocimiento y Poder Popular, Lecciones con campesinos de Nicaragua, México y Colombia, Bogotá, Siglo XXI, 1986. (También traducido al inglés, OIT, Ginebra, 1986).
- Investigación participativa (con Carlos R. Brandao, Montevideo, Instituto del Hombre, 1986).
- "La investigación-acción participativa: Política y epistemología", en Álvaro Camacho G. (ed.), La Colombia de hoy, Bogotá, Cerec, 1986. pp. 21–38.
- "Beyond Eurocentrism: Systematic Knowledge in a Tropical Context. A Manifesto" (con Luis E. Mora-Osejo), en Boaventura de Sousa Santos (ed.), Cognitive justice in a global world: prudent knowledges for a decent life, London, Lexington Books, 2007. pp. 21–38.

== See also ==
- Bronislaw Malinowski Award
