= Minuto de Dios =

Colombian religious television program

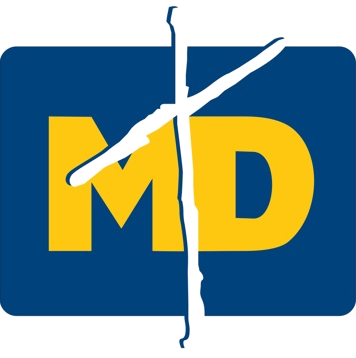
logo of Minuto de Dios

Minuto de Dios (in English Minute of God) is a Colombian non-profit Catholic religious organization founded by Rafael García Herreros. In 1950, García Herreros began a daily, minute-long radio program under the name The Minute of God. The program went on national television in 1955 and has aired more than 17,000 times since then, making it the longest-running program on Colombian television.

== History ==
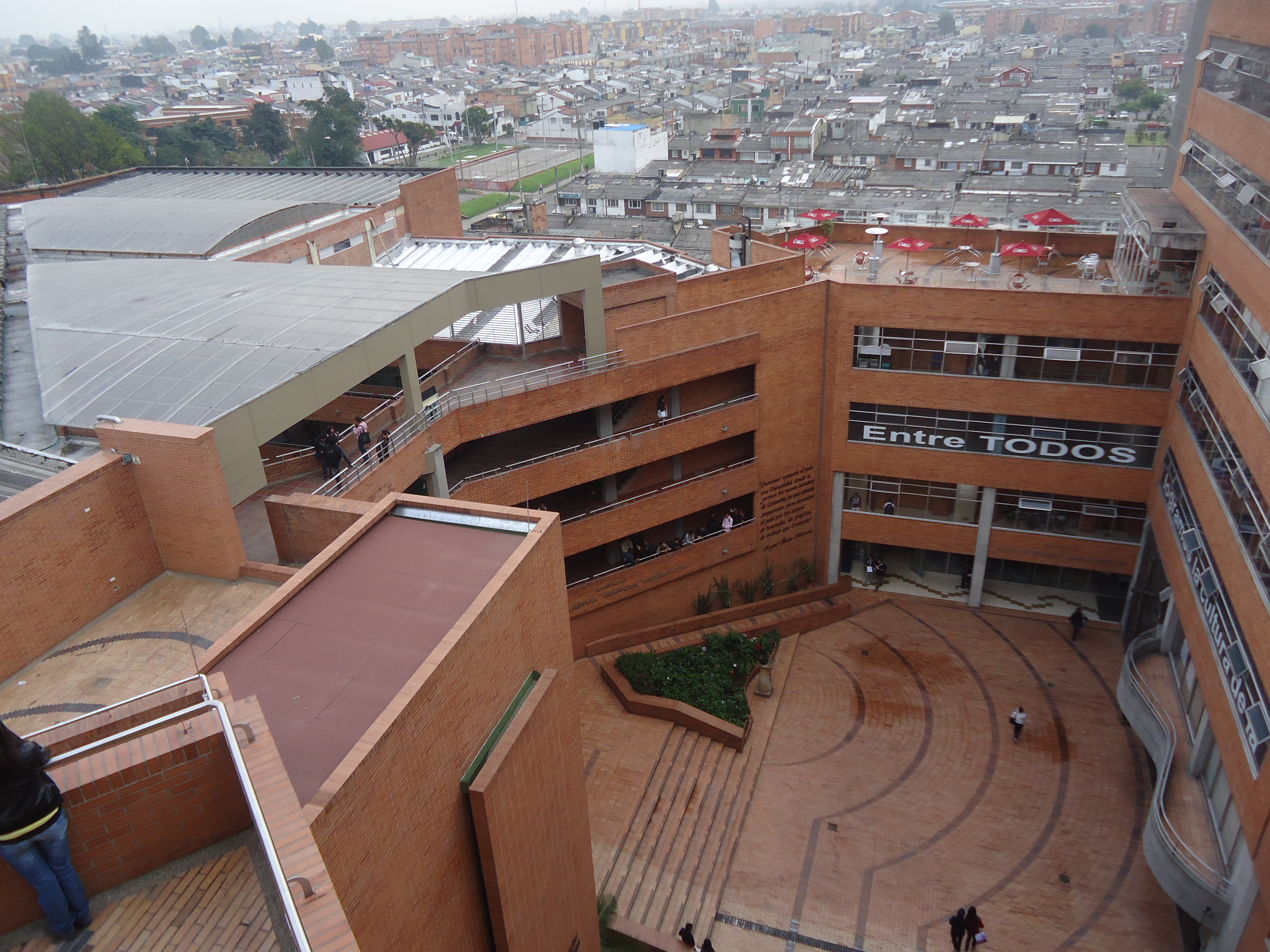
The campus of UNIMINUTO

In 1950, Father Rafael García Herreros began a daily radio program on Emisoras Fuentes in Cartagena. The program lasted just eight months, as the priest traveled to Europe, and returned on stations in other cities in December 1951. On January 10, 1957, this program made the leap to the then-new national television network, where it began airing for one minute every weeknight at 7 p.m. Its uninterrupted airing has continued to this day, making it the oldest program on Colombian television. in the 1990s, this expanded to include the then-new private networks, RCN and Caracol, which are required to carry the program. Minuto de Dios began as a radio program that reflect on God, the human being, and the responsibilities all christians have with their society and its transformation.

Within weeks of beginning the program, Father García Herreros was approached by the Beneficencia de Cundinamarca and offered a monthly sponsorship of 1,500 pesos, which the priest promptly distributed in three installments to the poor. When he ran out of money, a prostitute approached him and gave him another 500 pesos. Soon, the ministry began to construct houses for the poor, in an illegal shantytown near the Bogotá Military Hospital. However, when the owner of the land took action against the illegal construction, Antonio Restrepo Barco stepped up and donated the first parcel of land in what would become the Barrio Minuto de Dios. The first home was built on the site in 1957, and the next year, the Corporación Minuto de Dios was founded, marking the beginnings of wider social activity. The neighborhood later grew to have a museum, children's crafts center and park.

In 1961, García Herreros had another idea: to create a charity event in which "the rich ate like the poor". The result was the Banquete del Millón (Banquet of the Million), which was first held on November 25, 1961 and has been organized every year since.

Minuto de Dios's religious activities continued to grow, and so too did its profile. When President Belisario Betancur received the Prince of Asturias Award in 1983, he donated its prize money to Minuto de Dios. President Betancur also protected Minuto de Dios from the frequent bidding cycles by which Colombian television companies and programs were selected, stating that "God does not need to present a bid". It established a programadora, Lumen 2000, whose primary purpose was to provide religious programming for public television. The largest and most significant expansion came in 1990, when the Corporación Universitaria Minuto de Dios (Minuto de Dios University Corporation, abbreviated UNIMINUTO), was established, with its main campus in the Barrio Minuto de Dios.

García Herreros remained the host of the program until his death in 1992; he died the night of that year's Banquete del Millón. He was succeeded by Father Diego Jaramillo, who continues to host the program and heads the ministry. Aside from substitute hosts, who come from the same Congregation of Jesus and Mary ministry as García Herreros and Jaramillo, there have been only two regular hosts in the program's history.

In 2015, the Corporación Minuto de Dios celebrated the 60th anniversary of the TV program by unveiling a mosaic depicting the face of Father García Herreros, measuring 9.24 metres (30.3 ft) in height and 7.5 metres (25 ft) in width.

== Activities ==
=== Housing ===
By 2005, the ministry's 50th anniversary, Minuto de Dios had constructed some 50,000 housing units.

=== Broadcasting ===
Minuto de Dios remains active in broadcasting. The corporation also operates four broadcast radio stations, on 107.9 FM in Bogotá, 89.5 FM in Cartagena, 1230 AM in Medellín and 1370 AM in Barranquilla. The first of these stations, in Bogotá, was established on May 7, 1987. Additionally, Minuto de Dios controls a media company known as Lumen (formerly Lumen 2000), which started in 1991 as a programadora providing religious programming to public television and has since expanded to event production and large-format printing, though it continues to produce the Minuto de Dios capsules.

=== Social industry ===
In 1992, Minuto de Dios opened a confectionery geared toward producing candy for export, with the goal of creating 25,000 new jobs.

Other UNIMINUTO endeavors include Fundases, which provides agricultural consulting services, and a chain of bookstores.

=== University ===
The Corporación Universitaria Minuto de Dios (UNIMINUTO), founded in 1990, educates more than 100,000 students.

=== Other ===
Minuto de Dios is involved in healthcare, controlling a health corporation (Corporación de Salud Minuto de Dios). It also operates the Fundación Eudes, which provides treatment for patients with HIV/AIDS.
