= Antonio García (ELN commander) =

Colombian revolutionary commander

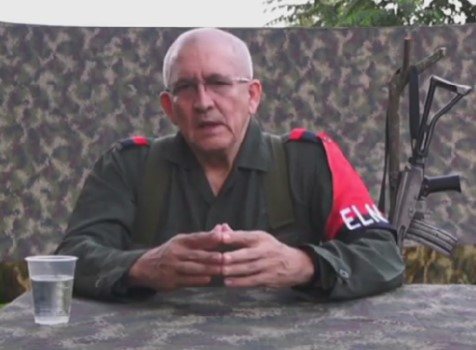
- García in 2020
- Born: Eliécer Erlington Chamorro Acosta; 10 January 1956 (age 70); Mocoa, Putumayo, Colombia
- Military career
- Allegiance: National Liberation Army
- Rank: Commander
- Conflicts: Colombian Conflict

Antonio García is the nom de guerre of Eliécer Erlington Chamorro Acosta (born 10 January 1956 in Mocoa, Putumayo Department), one of the main commanders of the National Liberation Army (ELN).

The ELN is a revolutionary, Marxist, insurgent guerrilla group that has been operating in several regions of Colombia since 1966. Less well-known than the FARC, it is estimated to be smaller, with between 3,500 and 5,000 armed personnel.

It is said that Jacobo Arenas (the "nom de guerre" of Luis Morantes), a founder and ideological leader of the FARC-EP, was seen as a hero by García, who once stated in an interview to a Latin American journalist that he considered Arenas to be a hero, just as he considered Simón Bolívar, José Martí and Che Guevara to be heroes.

On May 26, 2008, Ecuadorean and Colombian media reported the arrest of García in Ecuador. The Ecuadorean military said they "probably" did have him in custody, but needed to do more investigation to be sure. The arrest proved to be a mistake. The arrested guerrilla was identified as Willington Claro Arévalo, alias 'Antonio'.
