= R. H. Moreno Durán =

Colombian writer

R.H. Moreno-Durán
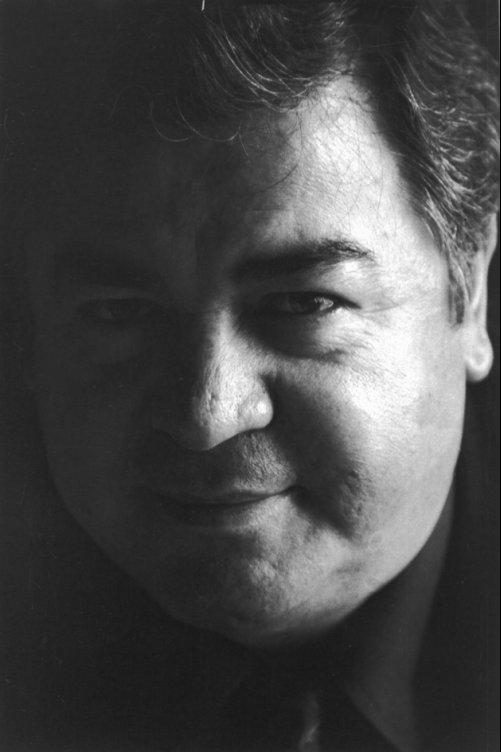
- Born: November 7, 1945; Tunja, Boyacá, Colombia.
- Died: November 21, 2005 (aged 60); Bogotá, Colombia.
- Education: Universidad Nacional de Colombia
- Occupation: Writer
- Website: https://augustasilaba.uniandes.edu.co/

Signature
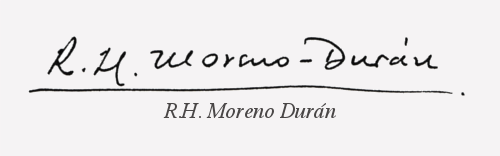

Rafael Humberto Moreno Durán, also known by his acronym R.H. Moreno Durán (Tunja, November 7, 1945 Tunja—November 21, 2005 Bogotá) was a novelist, essayist and playwright considered one of the most remarkable Colombian writers of the 20th century. His work includes the trilogy Femina Suite (comprising Juego de Damas, El toque de Diana and Finale Capriccioso con Madonna), and the play Cuestión de Habitos, for which he received the Ciudad de San Sebastián prize. He collaborated with several publications, including El País and La Vanguardia newspapers. He also was director of the Latin-American edition of Quimera journal.
