= Luis Villar Borda =

Colombian diplomat, lawyer (1929–2008)

Luis Villar Borda (1929 – July 23, 2008) was a Colombian politician, diplomat and lawyer.

== Personal life ==
He was born in New York City to Colombian parents who returned to Colombia during the Great Depression. In Colombia he studied political science at the National University of Colombia, before doing a doctorate at the University of Berlin. He was in Bogotá at the murder of Jorge Gaitán in 1948, and witnessed the Bogotazo. When Rojas Pinilla took power he went into exile in East Germany. When he came back he was a founding member of the Movimiento Revolucionario Liberal (MRL) alongside Gabriel García Márquez, Alfonso López Michelsen, and others. It was at this time he was elected a congressman. Under Carlos Lleras Restrepo he worked on Constitutional Reform Committee. From 1970 to 1973 he was Ambassador of Colombia to Sweden, before returning to Colombia to become a congressman again, where he rose to be Speaker of the House in Colombia. After that he became a member of the Colombian delegation to the United Nations; to do this he renounced his American citizenship. From 1983 until 1988 he was Colombian Ambassador to China, and from 1988 to 1991 he was the last Colombian Ambassador to East Berlin. He later wrote a memoir called El Ultimo Embajador. He was also the uncle of the actor and comedian Mo Rocca. He died on July 23, 2008.
