= Rafael García-Herreros =

Colombian catholic priest

Servant of God Rafael García-Herreros
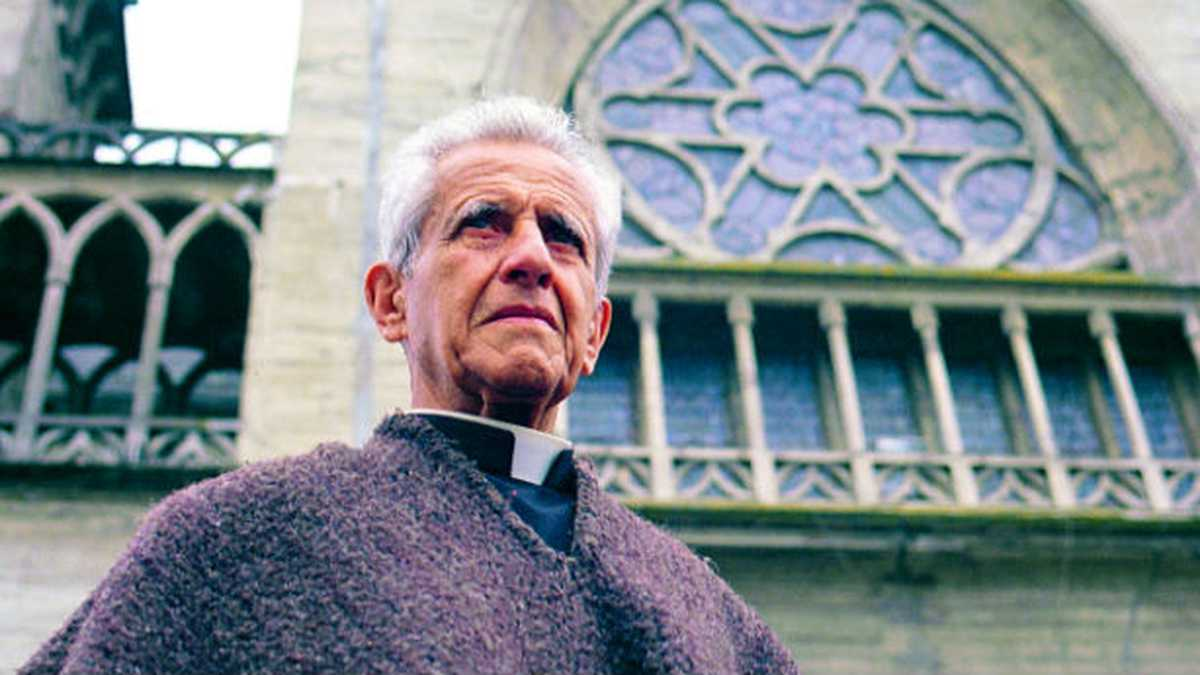

Priest, Founder
- Born: Rafael García-Herreros Unda; January 17, 1909; Cúcuta, Colombia
- Died: November 24, 1992 (aged 83); Bogotá, Colombia
- Venerated in: Roman Catholic Church

Rafael García-Herreros Unda (Cúcuta, January 17, 1909–Bogotá, November 24, 1992) was a Colombian leader of the Charismatic Catholic Minuto de Dios organization.

García-Herreros born in Cúcuta January 17 of 1909, son of the Julio César García Herreros Orbegozo and of María Unda Pérez. In 1923, when he was 14 years old, he went to Catholic Seminary of Pamplona, where he finished his studies in November 1927 . In 1928 he was invited to be a member to Congregation of Jesus and Mary, founded by St. Juan Eudes; He became a member the February 7 of 1932. In the following years, García Herreros studied philosophy, Latín, Greek, English, science, ecclesiastical history, interpretation of the Bible, dogma, canonical, straight canonical, Hebrew, art, literature and others.

In 1950 he began hosting a radio show "El Minuto de Dios," a daily one-minute show of religious reflection. It proved popular and soon expanded on the radio and moved to television in 1955. In 1961 he began to Banquete del Millon fundraiser, where the wealthy paid large amounts to eat a simple meal. The organization used the funds to build housing for the poor.

== Early years ==
García-Herreros, son of a military man, Julio César García-Herreros and María Unda, was born on January 17, 1909, in the city of Cúcuta. In 1923, at the age of 14, he entered the school of Santo Tomás de Aquino, in Pamplona directed by French parents, where he would finish his studies, in November 1927. In 1928 he was invited to enter the Congregation of Jesus and Mary, founded by Saint John Eudes; community that he entered on February 7, 1932; in 1944 he was ordained as a priest, officiating his first mass at the Church of Our Lady of Sorrows in Bogotá. Between 1934 and 1954 he dedicated himself to training seminarians in different centers of the country, an activity that he combined with a trip to improve philosophy in Europe between 1950 and 1951.

== Minuto de Dios Foundation ==
In 1946 he began a career linked to the media: first on radio 1946 on Radio Fuentes in Cartagena and then, from January 10, 1955, and for 37 continuous years, on television, with his well-known program El Minuto de Dios. In turn, the construction of a popular neighborhood began in Cali and later, from 1957, and on land donated by Antonio Restrepo and Estanislao Olarte, near the Juan Amarillo river, west of Bogotá, the El Minuto neighborhood. of God.

Since November 1961, at the initiative of García-Herreros, the Millón Banquet has been held, with which many of the needs of the neighborhood are financed, which, as of September 10, 1965, became a parish and whose first parish priest was the 'el father 'García-Herreros. He was also the one who founded the Museum of Contemporary Art (1966) on its grounds, supplied it with a station, a publishing house, a television programmer and a university, making it a true citadel.

The scenography of the program consisted of a wooden cross with an inclined crossbar, after the image of García-Herreros, who in recent years wore a ruana over his cassock.

The program has continued to be broadcast after the death, in 1992, of García-Herreros, maintaining the same scenery and the same sentence at the end. In 2005, the show celebrated 50 years of uninterrupted broadcasting.

== García-Herreros and the Charismatic Renewal ==
García-Herreros was also the promoter of the Catholic Charismatic Renovation spirituality stream in Colombia and Latin America. It is known that from the 1960s he invited some Protestant preachers from the Baptist Church in the United States to guide the formation of the first prayer groups, typical of this religious current. In addition, this priest was given the task of creating various organizations that under the name of "Minute of God" would promote the charismatic renewal, through the realization of massive Eucharists and worship and praise congresses, religious music concerts, seminars of initiation and follow-up, formation schools for the laity, radio and television programs, and various publications. After his death, several priests from his religious community have continued this mission of evangelization.

== Death ==
On November 24, 1992, during the XXXII Millón Banquet, García-Herreros died at the age of 83.

== Recognitions ==
In 1982, the President of the Republic, Belisario Betancur, gave him the Prince of Asturias Award that had been awarded to him by the Spanish government, to the Minute of God; in November 1986, President Virgilio Barco granted him the National Order in the degree of Grand Cross; in 1987 he received the National Solidarity Prize; on April 28, 1988, the Human Rights Award, awarded by the Jewish organization B'nai B'rith, and in 1990 the Comunica award, awarded by the Mariana Congregation and the Press, Film, Radio and Television Corporation (Precirte).

On August 20, 2009, within the framework of the 22nd Book Fair held in Corferias, the organization El Minuto de Dios celebrated the 100th anniversary of García-Herreros's birth, through the launch of 19 unpublished works, and the reissue of his biographical book "A life and a work" [1] all written by Father Diego Jaramillo, current president of this non-profit organization.

== Process of Beatification and Canonization ==
This was confirmed by the Cardinal Primate of Colombia, Rubén Salazar. The proposal was made by the Bishop of the Diocese of Engativá (Bogotá), Monsignor Héctor Gutiérrez Pabón.

The process for the beatification of father García-Herreros, founded by the Minuto de Dios, began to take shape after the Episcopate accepted the proposal made a few days ago by the bishop of the Diocese of Engativá (Bogotá), Monsignor Héctor Gutiérrez Pabón. The information was confirmed by the Cardinal Primate of Colombia, Rubén Salazar, who assured that the important thing was that “the process was opened” and explained that “since all the bishops of the country agree to open the process, there is undoubtedly a vote very positive and a clear conscience in the episcopate that Father García Herreros was a man of extraordinary virtues that it is worth considering that he is proposed by the universal church as a model of authentic Christianity. ”The Cardinal acknowledged that this process is just beginning and that It is very long and requires, even, miracles verified by the Holy See so that it can continue with the process. He added that the first step is for the process to be accepted by “ the Congregation for the Cause of Saints of the Holy See "and if accepted" the person who is the object of the process is declared Servant of God. "After this, the Cardinal said, when it is determined that there were heroic virtues and" God ratifies that process with a miracle ”and achieves the beatification and in a similar process, with new ratified miracles comes the canonization. When questioned about the friendship that Father García Herreros had with Pablo Escobar, Cardinal Salazar acknowledged that“ there could have been dark moments such as friendship with Pablo Escobar ”, but explained that“ what the father was looking for was to end those terrible attacks that drug trafficking was doing at that time and he tried to get closer to Pablo to stop the country's bleeding. You should not look at him as a friend of a drug trafficker but as a man who sought peace. ”Finally, he recalled that Father García Herreros handled billions of pesos,“ which passed through his hands and he died in absolute poverty. ” He emphasized: “He is a virtuous man and he gave his life for the service of others.” The proposal for the beatification of the founder of the Minute of God was made by Monsignor Gutiérrez Pabón, who said that “I presented a request with the intention that we endorse or support the project that would initiate the beatification process of Father Rafael García Herreros and with great satisfaction the Episcopate gave us its approval ".
