= Virginia Gutiérrez de Pineda =

Colombian anthropologist

- Born: November 4, 1921; El Socorro, Santander, Colombia
- Died: September 2, 1999 (aged 77); Bogotá, Colombia
- Known for: Anthropologist

Virginia Gutiérrez de Pineda (November 4, 1921, El Socorro, Santander – September 2, 1999, Bogotá) was a Colombian anthropologist who pioneered work on Colombian family and medical anthropology.

== Biography ==
She received her education at the National Pedagogy Institute, the Escuela Normal Superior of Colombia and the National Technology Institute, where she obtained her degree in Anthropology in 1944. She pursued graduate studies in Social and Medical Anthropology at the University of California, Berkeley (1953-1954) and, in 1962, she received her PhD in Social Sciences and Economics at the National Pedagogic University.

In 1960, she participated with other intellectuals and professionals, including Orlando Fals Borda, Eduardo Umaña Luna, María Cristina Salazar, Darío Botero Uribe, Carlos Escalante and Tomás Ducay, in the foundation of the first Faculty of Sociology in Latin America. at the National University of Colombia.

She was named Woman of the Year in Colombia in 1967 and, a year later, she won the Alejandro Ángel Escobar Award. In her career, she has also received two medals honoring her merits, the Camilo Torres medal (1963) and another medal awarded by the interamerican congress of family (1983).

Within her many accomplishments, she has also worked for the Guarnimiento foundation in two occasions. Recently, in 2015, the Colombian Bank of the Republic chose her image to appear on the $10.000 pesos bill in honor of all her merits. The new bills will be available by the end of 2016.

On November 4, 2019, Google celebrated her 98th birthday with a Google Doodle.

== Her work ==
- Familia y cultura en Colombia (1963)
- Causas culturales de la mortalidad infantil
- La medicina popular en Colombia
- Razones de un arraigo (1961)
- Organización social en la Guajira
- La familia en Colombia: estudio antropológico (1962).
- La medicina popular en Colombia: razones de su arraigo (1964).
- Estructura, función y cambio de la familia en Colombia (1976).
