= Camilism =

Catholic revolutionary socialist ideology

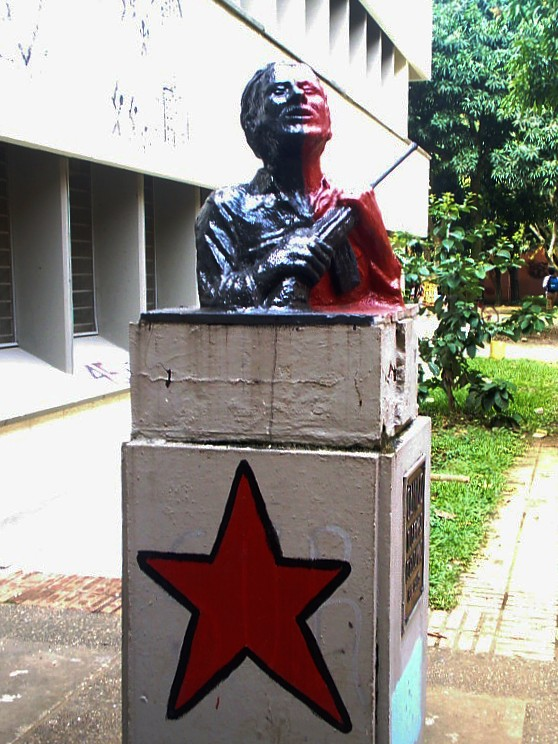
- Founder: Camilo Torres Restrepo
- Ideology: Catholic socialism; Revolutionary socialism; Liberation theology; Just war; Guevarism; Marxism; Liberal socialism (Before 1965); Reformism (Before 1965); Developmentalism (Before 1965)
- Political position: Far-left
- Religion: Catholicism
- Regional affiliation: UC-ELN; United Front; Polo democratico
- Continental affiliation: Montoneros; Movimiento Camilo Torres

Camilism, Camilismo, Thought of Camilo or Revolutionary Christianity is a Catholic revolutionary socialist political ideology based on the doctrine and legacy of Colombian Catholic priest and revolutionary Camilo Torres Restrepo.

Camilism is considered a fusion of Christian and Marxist thought, grouped along movements such as Christians for Socialism and the Sandinistas. Camilism was also adopted by the Montoneros.

== History ==
In his early years of political activity, Torres identified as a progressive Catholic and rejected the Leninist idea of a vanguard, a view he would later change, influenced by the Cuban Revolution and Fidel Castro. Despite being labelled a communist, Torres, for at least the majority of his life, rejected that label, while also declaring that he is not an anti-communist.

In 1964, shortly before forming the United Front, Torres called for a catalogue of reformist and developmentalist programs to improve the socioeconomic situation; his views from back then were considered "liberal-socialist". However, by 1965, Torres concluded "that only profound social, political and economic change, rather than gradual reform and "development," could provide the solution to Colombia's problems."

Inspired by Camilo Torres, Bolivian students were the first to declare themselves Camilistas. The Montoneros also adopted this ideology.

== Ideology ==
Camilo Torres Restrepo believed in a "new Christianity" where the Roman Catholic Church takes an active role in the reformation of society. Additionally, he praised Joseph Stalin and reportedly prayed at his tomb.

Although he praised Stalin, Torres did not consider himself a communist for at least the majority of his life, even openly stating at one point that:

The Colombian clergy is certainly not guilty of Communism. Communism holds a philosophical system incompatible with Christianity, although in its socio-economic aspirations most of its postulates do not conflict with Christian faith.

Despite not being a communist and not wanting to be identified with communists, Torres was vocal about working with them for common goals:

I am prepared to fight together with the Communists for our common goals: against the oligarchy and United States domination; for the winning of power by the people. I do not want to be identified with the Communists and, hence, I have always sought to work together not only with them but with all independent revolutionaries and revolutionaries of other convictions. That the large newspapers persist in saying that I am a Communist is of no importance. I prefer to follow the voice of my own conscience and not to submit to pressures from the oligarchy. I prefer to live according to the standards of the apostles of the church and not the standards of the apostles of our ruling class. John XXIII allowed me to join in united actions with the Communists when he declared the following in his encyclical Pacem in terris: "It must be borne in mind, furthermore, that neither can false philosophical teachings regarding the nature, origin, and destiny of the universe and of man be identified with historical movements that have economic, social, cultural, or political ends, not even when these movements have originated from those teachings and have drawn and still draw inspiration therefrom."

Torres also openly stated that his 1965 United Front is revolutionary and socialist:

The platform [manifesto] of struggle of the United Front of the People can be realised only after the people have taken power. Its only novelty consists in its seeking the common points of the revolution without entering into religious or party differences. It can be accepted by Catholics and non-Catholics, by poor Liberals and poor Conservatives, by the revolutionary elements of the NML, the Communist, ANAPO, and Christian Democratic parties, and especially by the revolutionary elements of the non-aligned in these groups. However, it is necessary to explain that this platform leans toward the establishment of a socialist state, that is, "socialist" understood only in a technical and positive sense, not in the ideological sense. We offer practical, not theoretical, socialism.

Torres desired a revolution where the poor majorities would seize power from the privileged minorities, believing that:

The Revolution, therefore, is the way to achieve a government that feeds the hungry, clothes the naked, teaches the ignorant, carries out works of charity, of love for one's neighbor, not only occasionally and temporarily, not only for a few, but for the majority of our neighbors. For this reason the Revolution is not only permitted but obligatory for Christians who see in it the only effective and broad way of achieving love for all . It is true that "there is no authority except from God" (St. Paul, Rom. XIII, 1). But St. Thomas says that the concrete attribution of authority is made by the people.

He also believed that:

The Church's temporary defects should not scandalize us. The Church is human. What is important is to believe that she is also divine and that if we Christians fulfill our obligation to love our neighbor, we are strengthening the Church

Torres also stated that, if those minorities did not offer violent resistance, this revolution could be peaceful.

He also rejected a notion that "trade unionists are the oligarchs of the working class."

Camilo's ideology can be considered a precursor or predecessor of liberation theology, since Torres' doctrine is very similar to it.

Camilo's most significant contributions to Christian Revolutionary speech in Latin America are the following:

- His proposal of rethinking the traditional leftist position that used imported ideological positions as the starting point.
- The position that armed revolution was a legitimate way for Christians to fulfil the duty of helping the poor.
- His position that the revolution led to a process of unity of the people, of Christians and Marxists, who would unite in the struggle.

Another aspect of Camilism-Revolutionary Christianity is its rejection of stage-based conceptions of revolution, which assert that before the socialist revolution there is a need for a bourgeois-democratic revolution. Camilism was influenced by the orientation of the Cubans and Che Guevara's thesis on the construction of the new man in Cuba.

Torres also argued that the Catholic Church's doctrine of just war provided the moral justification for a violent revolution, stating that:

The followers [of the United Front], when planning the take-over of political power necessarily have to make a tactical decision - to follow through to the ultimate consequences and use whatever means the oligarchy leaves open to seize power. This attitude has no great ideological consequences because the church itself has established the conditions for a just war. Violence is not excluded from the Christian ethic, because if Christianity is concerned with eliminating the serious evils which we suffer and with saving us from the continuous violence in which we live without possible solution, the ethic is to be violent once and for all in order to destroy the violence which the economic minorities exercise against the people.

Camilo Torres was also an advocate of the expropriation of church property, declaring during an interview that:

I am fervent partisan to the expropriation of Church property even in the case that no revolution might occur.

Camilo also declared that:

Colombian society is, in its majority, a Catholic society in the sense that it complies with external rites (baptism, confession, Communion, marriage, burial Mass, extreme unction, processions, novenae, scapulars, first Fridays). Within Colombian society there are many who love their fellow man, with that love manifest in self-surrender, although they deny that they are Catholics or, at least, deny that they belong to the Church—the Church being understood as the ecclesiastical structure. If the pastoral program is concentrated on maintaining this situation, it may not be possible to build or extend the Kingdom of God. If the priority of love above all is accepted, and if preaching is preferred over the celebration of rites, the hierarchy will have to undertake a missionary pastoral program. Pastoral mission requires that the quality rather than the quantity of Catholics be emphasized, and that more insistence be placed on personal conviction than on the usual pressures of family and society. The exclusive teaching of Catholicism in the schools must be abandoned, pluralism must be accepted, and freedom of speech must be permitted in the classroom. Both children and adults must be led in Bible study. Emphasis must be placed more on love as surrender of self than on professed faith and religious observances, and the preaching of the Gospel must be stressed above the celebration of rites. Steps must be taken to eliminate social and psychological factors that stand in the way of a conscientious and personal involvement in the Church on the part of those who want to love and surrender themselves to others; among these factors are the economic power of the Church and the political power of the Church. This power resides formally in laws and in the Concordat, and informally in clericalism (intromission, the desire to dominate in the temporal plane).

== Official church stance ==
Camilo Torres' political programme was read by Catholic bishop Joseph Blomjous and was found to contain no contradictions to Papal encyclicals.

== Camilist groups ==
=== Active ===
- Camilista Union - National Liberation Army

=== Defunct ===
- United Front
- Montoneros
- Movimiento Camilo Torres
- Polo democratico

== See also ==
- Fidelismo
- Guevarism
- Latin American liberation theology
- Tendencia Revolucionaria
