= National Liberation Army (Colombia) =

Far-left guerrilla group in Colombia

Camilista Union - National Liberation Army
- Unión Camilista Ejército de Liberación Nacional
- Logo of the UC-ELN.
- Leaders: Camilo Torres Restrepo † Nicolás Rodríguez Bautista (resigned) Pablo Beltrán (POW) Rafael Sierra Granados (POW), presumed dead Manuel Peréz #; Gustavo Aníbal Giraldo Antonio García; Wilver Villegas-Palomino
- Dates active: 1964–present
- Active regions: Colombia: especially in the departments of Arauca, Cauca, Chocó, Norte de Santander and Nariño and the subregion of Bajo Cauca Antioquia. Also active in Venezuela.
- Ideology: Catholic communism; Marxism–Leninism; Camilism; Latin American liberation theology; Guevarism
- Political position: Far-left
- Size: Approximately 6,000 to 6,300 (2026)
- Part of: Simón Bolívar Guerrilla Coordinating Board (1987–1994)
- Wars: Colombian conflict: Catatumbo campaign
- Flag

The Camilista Union - National Liberation Army (Spanish: Unión Camilista Ejército de Liberación Nacional, UC-ELN), also known as the National Liberation Army - Camilista Union (Ejército de Liberación Nacional - Unión Camilista, ELN-UC), and originally called the National Liberation Army (ELN), is a Colombian far-left guerrilla organization involved in the continuing Colombian conflict since 1964. The ELN advocates a composite Catholic communist ideology of Marxism–Leninism, Camilism and Latin American liberation theology. In 2013, it was estimated that the ELN forces consisted of between 1,380 and 3,000 guerrillas. Later, in 2026, its size grew to approximately 5,000 fighters in Colombia and neighboring Venezuela. Other sources reported 6,000 to 6,300 members, including unarmed support. According to former ELN national directorate member Felipe Torres, one-fifth of ELN supporters have taken up arms. The ELN has been classified as a terrorist organization by the governments of Colombia, the United States, Canada, New Zealand, and the European Union.

== History ==
=== Formation ===
The National Liberation Army was founded in 1964, by Fabio Vásquez Castaño and other Colombian rebels trained in Cuba. The group included "urban intellectuals" influenced by Che Guevara and Fidel Castro. Later, the ELN was headed by a series of Roman Catholic priests, exponents of liberation theology. Most notable was Camilo Torres Restrepo (1929–66), a well-known university professor who was openly critical of what he considered grossly unequal income among the social classes of Colombia. His attraction to the radical ideas of socialism led him to join the ELN, a guerrilla army intent upon affecting the revolutionary praxis of liberation theology among the poor people of Colombia. Father Camilo was killed in his first combat as an ELN guerrilla, and so became the exemplar ELN soldier, to be emulated by ELN guerrillas and other liberation theology priests from the lower ranks of the Roman Catholic priesthood.

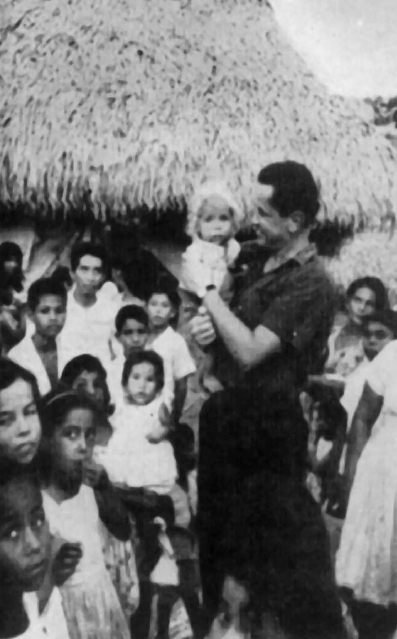
ELN guerrilla: Priest Camilo Torres among the peasants of Colombia.

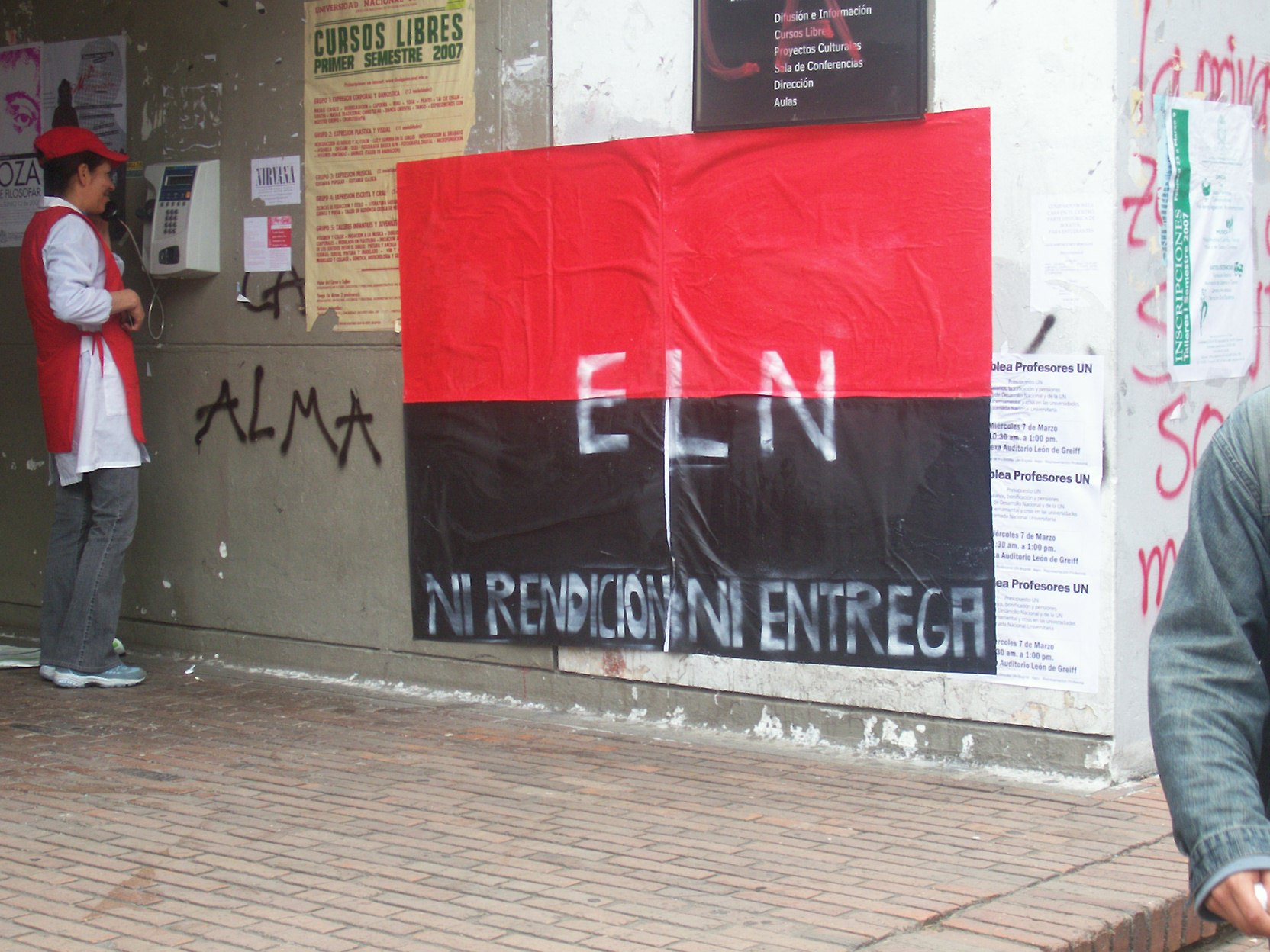
"Neither Surrender, Nor Capitulation" reads the poster of the Ejército de Liberación Nacional at the National University of Colombia.

In the years following its foundation, it brought together more students and young activists from cities than peasants, a social composition that distinguishes it from the FARC guerrillas, who are essentially peasants.

In the 1970s, after suffering military defeat and internal crises, the ELN was commanded by the Spanish priest Father Manuel Pérez Martínez (1943–98), alias El Cura Pérez, who shared leadership with Nicolás Rodríguez Bautista, alias "Gabino". El Cura Pérez presided over the National Liberation Army as one of its most recognized figures until he died of hepatitis B in 1998. He was instrumental in establishing the ideology of the ELN, a composite of Cuban revolutionary theory and liberation theology that proposes the establishment in Colombia of a Christian and communist regime to resolve the socioeconomic problems of chronic political corruption, poverty, and the exclusion of most Colombians from their country's government.

The ELN guerrillas survived the heavy fighting in the Colombian National Army's Operation Anorí (1973–74), and then reconstituted their forces, with partial assistance from the Colombian Government of President Alfonso López Michelsen (1974–78), who allowed the ELN to break from and escape encirclement by the Colombian army. López Michelsen helped the ELN in the hope of initiating peace negotiations with them in order to end the civil war. After this, the ELN resumed financing its military operations by means of kidnap for ransom, the extortion of money from Colombian and foreign petroleum companies and the taxation of the private illegal drug trade of Colombia.

The ELN did not participate in the peace negotiations conducted between the Colombian government of President Andrés Pastrana Arango (1998–2002) and FARC, yet did participate in an exploratory conference about possibly participating in peace negotiations. A Colombian government initiative towards granting the ELN a demilitarized zone in the southern region of the Bolívar Department was thwarted by right-wing political pressure from the United Self-Defense Forces of Colombia (AUC) whose paramilitary mercenaries conduct anti-guerrilla operations in that part of the department.

Peace talks began in 2022, but in August 2024 the Colombian government announced an end to a six-month ceasefire, as the ELN had returned to its practice of kidnapping civilians for ransom.

=== First peace discussions: 2002–2017 ===
==== Early contacts ====
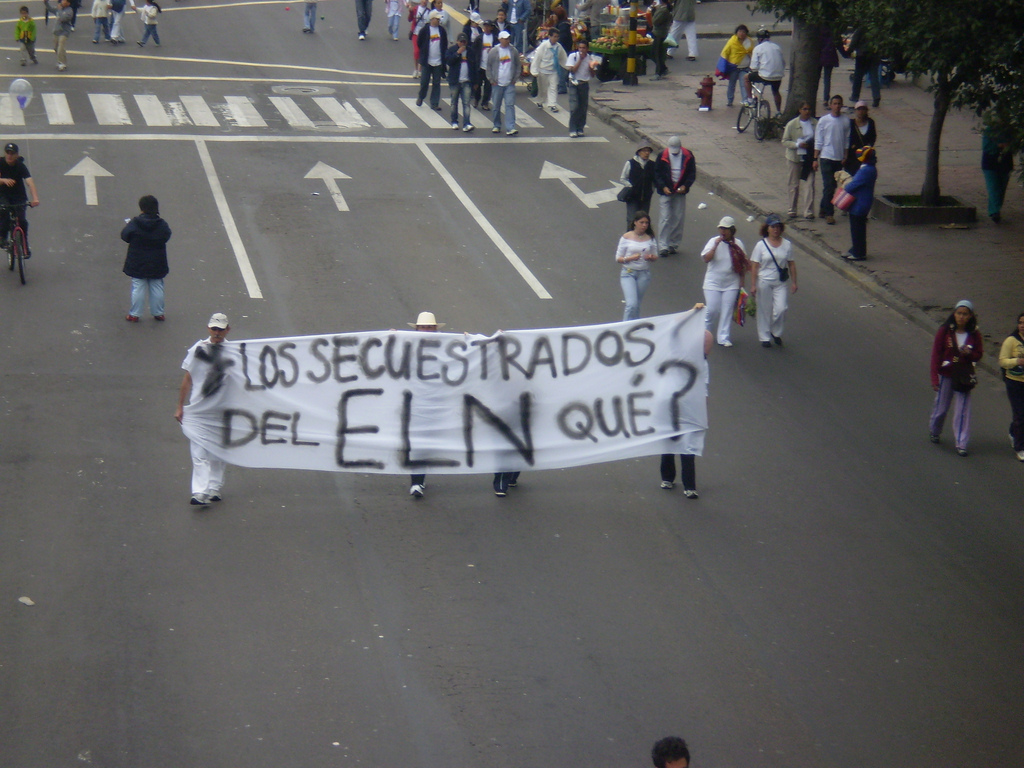
Protest march against ELN kidnapping: "What about those kidnapped by the ELN?"

Previous contacts continued during the early days of the Álvaro Uribe Vélez government but eventually were severed, neither party being fully trusting of the other. Only in mid-2004 did the ELN and the government began to make a series of moves that, with the announced mediation of the Vicente Fox government of Mexico, lead to another round of exploratory talks.

On 24 July 2004 the ELN apparently abducted Misael Vacca Ramírez, the Roman Catholic Bishop of Yopal, though their reasons were not clarified. The kidnappers said that Ramírez would be released with a message, but "Francisco Galán", a senior jailed ELN commander who has often acted as an intermediary between the government and the ELN's high command, said he did not know whether the group was responsible. The Bishop was subsequently released by ELN members, in good health, on 27 July, after his kidnapping had been condemned by Amnesty International and Pope John Paul II, among others. As far as is publicly known, he did not have any message to announce on behalf of the ELN.

Eventually, the ELN questioned Mexico's participation in the talks, arguing that it did not have confidence in the actions of a government which voted against Fidel Castro's Cuba during a United Nations vote. This led the Mexican government to end its participation.

==== Exploratory talks in Cuba ====
In December 2005, the ELN and the Colombian government began a new round of exploratory talks in Havana, Cuba, with the presence of the ELN's military commander "Antonio García", as well as "Francisco Galán" and "Ramiro Vargas". This was considered the direct result of three months of previous consultations with representatives of different sectors of public society through the figure of a "House of Peace" (Casa de Paz in Spanish).

Representatives from Norway, Spain and Switzerland joined both parties at the talks as observers.

The talks ended by 22 December and both parties agreed to meet again in January 2006. After a series of preliminary meetings, the next round of talks was later rescheduled for early-mid February.

During the February talks, which moved at a slow pace, the government decided to formally suspend capture orders for "Antonio García" and "Ramiro Vargas", recognizing them as negotiators and, implicitly, as political actors. The move was also joined by the creation of what was termed an alternative and complementary mechanism that could be used to deal with difficult issues and matters that concerned both parties, outside the main negotiating table. A formal negotiation process has yet to begin.

On 23 March, the ELN freed a Colombian soldier that it had kidnapped on 25 February, delivering him to the Red Cross, saying that it was a unilateral sign of good will.

The ELN's "Antonio García" expected to visit Cuba from 17 to 28 April, participating in different meetings with representatives of several political, economic and social sectors. The third round of the exploratory talks would have originally taken place in La Habana, Cuba from 2 to 12 May.

The third round of talks was later moved to take place from 25 to 28 April. Both parties reiterated their respect for the content and spirit of all previous agreements, and that they would continue working towards the design of a future peace process. The Colombian government and the ELN intend to study documents previously elaborated during the "House of Peace" stage, as well as documents from other participants and observers. Both parties expected to meet again after Colombia's 28 May presidential elections.

On 30 August 2007 the ELN said that in the statement the dialogues in Havana ended without agreement because of "two different conceptions of peace and methods to get to it".

==== Restored negotiations ====
Colombian President Álvaro Uribe invited ELN spokesman "Francisco Galán" for new talks about peace on 3 April 2008. The two spoke in the presidential palace. After the meeting Galán says the ELN will return to the negotiation table. The ELN released a press note shortly after that saying the rebel group "does not share the views" of "Galán" and dismissed him as their spokesman. The Marxist rebels did say they will continue to let "Galán" negotiate between the Colombian government and the rebels.

On 7 December, 2008 18 ELN guerrillas surrendered to the Colombian army in the northwestern province of Chocó.

In March 2016 the resumption of peace talks between the parties were announced, but were put on hold until the release of all hostages still kept by the ELN. The last hostages were finally released in February 2017 and the talks commenced in the same month, with Pablo Beltrán and Juan Camilo Restrepo heading the delegations of the ELN and the Colombian government, respectively.

On 4 September 2017, the ELN and President Juan Manuel Santos of Colombia announced a truce to begin on 1 October and to last at least until 12 January 2018.

From 25 to 29 May the group had a ceasefire so that "those who want to vote can do so peacefully" during the 2018 Colombian presidential election. The ELN said it "reserve[s] the right to defend [themselves] in case of an attack" by security forces or other armed groups.

=== Continued conflict: 2017–2022 ===
==== 2019 Bogotá car bombing ====
On 17 January 2019, the ELN performed a car bombing at the General Santander National Police Academy in Bogotá, Colombia. The truck detonated and killed 21 people, including the perpetrator, and injured 68 others. It was the deadliest attack on the Colombian capital since the 2003 El Nogal Club bombing and the first attack on the capital since the 2017 Centro Andino bombing. The ELN accepted responsibility for the attack and justified it as a response to the bombings made by the Colombian government during the unilateral ceasefire.

As a result of the bombing, President Iván Duque Márquez announced on 18 January that peace dialogue between the Government of Colombia and the ELN was officially suspended. Duque also demanded that Cuba extradite the ten ELN leaders that found refuge on the island nation during peace talks and the reactivation of their Interpol Red Notices, and criticized Venezuela for providing refuge for the ELN on the Colombia-Venezuela border. In response to the request, Cuba's Foreign Minister announced that Cuba would abide by the protocols of ongoing negotiations between both parties.

==== 2019 Venezuelan protests ====
The Redes Foundation denounced in the Colombian Public Ministry that armed groups made up of National Liberation Army members and FARC dissidents, supported by the Bolivarian National Police and FAES officials, murdered two Venezuelan protesters, Eduardo José Marrero and Luigi Ángel Guerrero, during a protest in the frontier city of San Cristóbal, in Táchira state. Other protesters were injured during the shooting.

==== 2020 ceasefire over coronavirus ====
In March 2020, the National Liberation Army (ELN) declared a unilateral one-month ceasefire during the outbreak of the COVID-19 pandemic, to start on 1 April.

General Luis Fernando Navarro asserted on 5 January 2021 that the ELN lost 700 members through targeted attacks in 2020, and that it still had 2,500 armed combatants.

=== Second peace negotiations: 2022–2025 ===
==== Revival of peace talks ====
On 21 November 2022, after the election of Gustavo Petro breathed new life into the peace process, delegates of the ELN and the new Colombian government met in Venezuela to resume the peace talks that faltered in January 2019, after the Bogotá car bombing. The negotiations continued into the first week of December 2022, with representatives of the ELN and the Colombian government meeting for the continuation of peace talks in El Ávila National Park in Caracas. On the occasion, ELN chief negotiator Pablo Beltrán stated that Colombians have to work towards reconciliation and recreate a new nation in peace and equity and in a similar spirit Danilo Rueda, the High Commissioner for Peace in Colombia, stated that peace is not only a question of laying down arms, but a process linked to the need for change. Following the conclusion of the first round of talks, the ELN announced a unilateral holiday truce lasting from 24 December 2022 until 2 January 2023.

After Mexico agreed to be an official guarantor to the peace process, it was chosen as the host country for the second round of talks, expected to begin in January 2023. With the addition of Mexico, along with Cuba, Chile, Norway and Venezuela, there are now five guarantor countries to the peace process.

After misunderstandings arose regarding a bilateral ceasefire between the ELN and the government, an emergency meeting took place on 21 January in Caracas to reassure both sides of their intentions and to set a date for the second round of negotiations, scheduled to commence on 12 February 2023.

Prior to the restart of peace talks, the influential ELN-commander Antonio Garcia criticised the approach of the Colombian government, stating that "the peace process cannot be used as an 'umbrella' for other issues". The former commander of the ELN, Carlos Velandia, dismissed this stance as posturing ahead of the next round of talks, which commenced on time in Mexico City, opining that the ELN wants to negotiate its own accord and not be lumped in with other groups.

The Colombian government appointed Vera Grabe Loewenherz as its head negotiator with the ELN in December 2023.

In 17 January 2025 the Colombian government suspended peace talks yet again after a massacre carried out in Tibú due to continuous gunfights with FARC-EP dissidents which resulted in around 50 civilians killed.

=== Continuation of conflict: 2025-present ===
==== Attack by the United States ====
On 17 October 2025, the U.S. Department of Defense carried out a strike on an alleged ELN drug vessel, killing three as a part of the 2025 United States strikes on Venezuelan boats and the 2025 United States naval deployment in the Caribbean.

==== Call for a ‘national accord’ ====
On 9th January 2026, a statement posted on ELN's X(formerly twitter) account said that after elections in Colombia this year, the group would like to work with the nation’s new government to design agreements aimed at defeating poverty, protecting ecosystems and “overcoming” the drug trade in rural areas. The statement was made after reports of the Colombian government and the UN planning to jointly conduct operations against the ELN.

On 20th January 2026 in a published video ELN's head Antonio Garcia proposed an independent commission to investigate the group’s alleged links to the drug trade, while affirming that while the rebels impose a tax on cocaine traders, they do not run any drug trafficking routes or cocaine labs. In a message on Sunday on the 15th of February President Gustavo Petro accepted the proposal, while adding that the agency that verifies the rebel’s claims should be “scientific and independent of governments” and should deliver its findings to the United Nations. He also urged the rebels to back efforts to replace coca crops in the northeastern Catatumbo region.

On Monday, the 16th of February 2026, the group released five police officers it had kidnapped during the first week of January.

Next week on the 23rd of February 2026, also on Monday, the ELN declared a unilateral ceasefire ahead of next month’s high-stakes congressional elections. The upcoming elections have had already been marked by violence.

== Ideology ==
The ideology of ELN has been described as "Catholic Marxism", Marxism as well as "Marxism-Leninism interspersed with revolutionary Catholicism", and the organization embraces Roman Catholic morality, which makes the group heavily utilize the concept of martyrdom, and historically refuse to take part in the Colombian drug trade. It later softened its stance and was reported to be involved to drug trafficking, although it continues to claim that it is not directly involved and "only earns a relatively small amount of money from gramaje" (small tax on drug producers). ELN stresses Catholic moralism, including the need to "live with dignity" by adhering to Catholic teaching. The ELN has had links with the Catholic Church ever since its foundation in 1964, as it has been founded by radical Catholic priests.

It adheres to liberation theology, which includes the notion that Catholicism requires the creation of a fair and equal society based on socialist principles, and an anti-imperialist agenda that primarily targets corporations active in the Colombian extractive sector. The Catholic character of the party was further developed by its former leaders, Camilo Torres Restrepo and Manuel Peréz, who were Catholic priests. Its ideology has been described as "a violent brand of liberation theology that mixes Marxist politics with the Roman Catholic Church".

The ELN is Guevarist and postulates an economy based on cooperative associations. It rejects the principle of market economy altogether and instead proposes a socieconomic organization based on the principles of the Cuban Revolution and liberation theology, specifically the Catholic ideal of social justice. It criticizes capitalism and liberalism as oppressive, undemocratic and unable to satisfy the "social rights" of the Colombian population. It argues that capitalism's individualism must be rejected in favor of collective self-determination.

The ELN also adheres to Protracted People's War, a Maoist strategy, which was adopted at the First Congress of the organization.

Apart from its Catholicism, the ELN is heavily tied to Revolutionary Cuba and Castroism. The founders of ELN trained in Havana, and the organization follows the ideology of foquismo based on writings of Che Guevara; thus its ideology is also described as a "Che Guevara type of communist ideology". José Míguez Bonino classified ELN as a Castroist and Guevarist movement, noting that Cuba was closely involved in the training and preparation of its foundation. The ELN did not adhere to either the Soviet or Chinese ideological lines and instead became independent, which resulted in the organization accepting clergy into its ranks.

== Activities ==
The ELN was designated as a Foreign Terrorist Organization by the U.S. State Department on October 8, 1997. The ELN was one of 30 Foreign Terrorist Organizations included on the original FTO list, which also designated FARC as an FTO. The ELN was listed because of its reputation for ransom kidnappings and armed attacks on Colombia's infrastructure. In April 2004, the European Union added the ELN to its list of terrorist organizations for those actions and its breaches of humanitarian law.

The ELN's main source of income are businesses and middle class civilians in its areas of operation. To enforce these "taxes", they frequently take civilians captive to use as leverage. While the ELN uses the terms "war taxes" and "retentions" for these actions, critics insist they constitute "extortion" and "kidnapping". According to Claudia Calle, spokesperson for País Libre, a Colombian foundation for victims of abductions, 153 hostages had died "in the hands of the ELN" between 2000 and 2007. According to País Libre, ELN abducted over 3,000 people between 2000 and 2007.

== Relations ==
=== FARC ===
The ELN also occasionally operated with the FARC-EP, and like FARC, it has targeted civilians, according to a February 2005 report by the United Nations High Commissioner for Human Rights: "During 2004, the FARC-EP and the ELN carried out a series of attacks against the civilian population, including several massacres of civilians and kidnappings by the FARC-EP. There were occasional joint actions by the FARC-EP and the ELN."

In mid-2006, mutual rivalries between local FARC and ELN forces escalated into hostilities in Arauca, along the border with Venezuela. According to the BBC, "the FARC have for some years moved to take over ELN territory near the Venezuelan border, and the smaller rebel army reacted by killing several FARC militants". A statement posted on FARC's homepage accused the ELN of "attacks that we only expected from the enemy".

On 26 May 2008 the ELN wrote a letter to the FARC secretariat, seeking cooperation with Colombia's largest rebel group to overcome "the difficulties we are experiencing in today's Colombian insurgent movement". The letter was published on the ELN website. On 27 June 2017, FARC ceased to be an armed group, disarming itself and handing over its weapons to the United Nations.

==== FARC dissidents ====
According to InSight Crime, the ELN and FARC dissidents met together in Venezuela to form a potential alliance in October 2018. Sources based in the Arauca department in Colombia provided the information, with reports that the groups would participate in illicit activity together. It was also alleged that former FARC commander Iván Márquez participated in the talks with the ELN.

=== Venezuela ===
Since the 1990s, the ELN began to establish positions in the western border states of Venezuela. The ELN grew close to Venezuelan officials during the tenure of Venezuelan president Hugo Chávez, with Chávez approving relationships with the group.

InSight Crime also states that Venezuelan president Nicolás Maduro was tolerant of the ELN, explaining that "ELN's expansion in Venezuela has been marked by the Maduro administration's inaction and even encouragement towards the group"; according to the group, the ELN operates in at least 12 of the 23 states of Venezuela. The Venezuelan NGO Fundación Redes has reported that the Venezuelan military had possibly armed ELN members. In 2019, ELN supported Maduro during the Venezuelan presidential crisis and said they "will fight" US troops if they invade Venezuela.

Following the removal of Maduro by the United States in January 2026, the new administration of Delcy Rodríguez started to cooperate with American forces in joint attacks against the ELN, one of which left two dozens people dead in November 2026.

==== Tupamaros ====
The ELN has received support from the Tupamaro movement in Venezuela, a Venezuelan colectivo and political party. The Tupamaro movement supported the ELN's dialogue with the Colombian government, stating, "The Tupamaro Revolutionary Movement, now more than ever, stands in solidarity with this sister organization in the historic struggle against the neo-Granadian oligarchy and Yankee imperialism. We strongly ratify all of our support for the guerrillas and the ELN High Command, in the process that is developed with the participation of the Colombian people in the resolution of the armed conflict and the construction of peace with social justice".

=== Pablo Escobar ===
The ELN had relations with Pablo Escobar, with Escobar often hiring the ELN to carry out bombings and assassinations against government targets.

== See also ==
- Terrorism in Colombia
- Terrorism in Ecuador
