= Timeline of the Colombian conflict =

This is a timeline of events related to the Colombian conflict.

== Background ==
Events that preceded the conflict.

=== 1890s ===
==== 1899 ====
- Thousand Days' War, civil war between the two ruling parties Colombian Liberal Party and Colombian Conservative Party,

=== 1900s ===
==== 1902 ====
- End of Civil War. Tensions between parties remain.

=== 1920s ===
==== 1928 ====
- Banana Massacre in the town of Ciénaga, Magdalena by the Colombian Army after a workers' strike against the United Fruit Company.

=== 1940s ===
==== 1948 ====
- Death of Jorge Eliécer Gaitán triggers El Bogotazo, Liberal and Conservative violence spread as part of La Violencia.

=== 1950s ===
- Marquetalia and other enclaves created by radical Liberal and Communist guerrillas.

==== 1953 ====
- General Gustavo Rojas Pinilla seizes power and offers an amnesty to Liberal and Conservative fighters, most of whom demobilize.

==== 1958 ====
- The National Front created by the Liberal and Conservative parties, after mutual agreements and a December 1957 plebiscite.

==== 1959 ====
- U.S. President Dwight D. Eisenhower sent a survey team to Colombia to investigate the political situation in Colombia. As a result, the U.S. decided to help Colombia in counter-insurgency doctrines.

== Colombian armed conflict ==
=== 1960s ===
==== 1960 ====
- January 11 - Jacobo Prías aka "Charro Negro", Chief of the Communist Agrarian Movement is killed. The Colombian government is blamed.

==== 1961 ====
- Reports of helicopters were being deployed with US instructors accompanying Colombian pilots.

==== 1962 ====
- A United States special warfare team, trained in Kennedy's Counterinsurgency doctrine, and headed by Gen. William Yarborough, was sent to Colombia. Following this cycles of special warfare teams arrived in Colombia between 1962 and 1965 to continue training in counterinsurgency operations
- Colombian Army military offensive against Marquetalia fails to eliminate the enclave.

==== 1964 ====
- Operation Soberanía (Colombia), launched by the Colombian Army simultaneously with Operation Marquetalia in southern Tolima Department.
- Establishment of the Revolutionary Armed Forces of Colombia (FARC) by Jacobo Arenas and Manuel Marulanda, among others.

==== 1965 ====
- Radical Liberal and Communist guerrillas from Marquetalia created the Southern Bloc

=== 1970s ===
==== 1971 ====
- The FARC begin kidnapping as a major source of income.

==== 1975 ====
- FARC Kidnaps the Dutch consul in Cali Eric Leupin, demanding a US$1 million in ransom.

==== 1976 ====
- October - FARC Dutch consul hostage is released.

==== 1977 ====
- FARC Kidnaps a member of the United States Peace Corps.

=== 1980s ===
==== 1980 ====
- February 27 – April 27 - Dominican embassy siege by 19th of April Movement (M-19)

==== 1985 ====
- November 6–7 - Palace of Justice siege by 19th of April Movement (M-19)
- May 28 - Patriotic Union (Colombia) founded

=== 1990s ===
==== 1990 ====
- Colombian army launched Operation Centauro against the guerrillas with no significant results.

==== 1991 ====
- Operation Casa Verde launched by the Colombian army in an attempt to combat guerrillas concentrated in the area of Uribe, Meta with operations also extending to the region of Yari.

==== 1996 ====
- June 16 - A confrontation for coca cultivations in Norte de Santander Department between the AUC paramilitaries and the FARC results in La Gabarra Massacre.

==== 1997 ====
- Operation Destructor launched by the Colombian army destroying numerous camp sites. According to the army there were 600 guerrilla casualties.
- Mapiripán massacre

==== 1999 ====
- FARC-Government peace process starts
- FARC released a hostage held since 1977 (22 years) after a payment of a US$250,000 ransom.

=== 2000s ===
==== 2002 ====
- Bojayá massacre
- Operation TH launched by the Colombian army to recover the former demilitarized zone after the failed peace process between the Pastrana government and the FARC guerrilla.

==== 2004 ====
- Operation JM launched by the Colombian army, first of operation part of Plan Patriota.

==== 2006 ====
- Parapolitics scandal broke out.

==== 2008 ====
- A humanitarian exchange of important hostages and the rescue of 15 important hostages, including three Americans and Íngrid Betancourt.

=== 2010s ===
==== 2010 ====
- January 1–18 FARC rebels are killed in a raid by the Colombian Air Force in the south while celebrating the New Year.

==== 2013 ====
- 1 January – The Colombian military kills 13 FARC rebels in an airstrike.
- 22 January – FARC rebels have blown up two southern oil pipelines with dynamite and planted a bomb on the top coal exporter's northern railway after the end of a ceasefire.
- 9 November – A gunman opens fire on a bar in Cali and kills eight people.

==== 2018 ====
- 5 January – Two encounters happened in southwestern Colombia, leaving at least 7 people killed. During the incident a rebel leader was shot dead.
- 10 January – A Colombian soldier was shot dead by an ELN sniper in the department of Arauca.
- 13 January – Militants of the ELN kidnapped a contractor of Ecopetrolun in the Department of Arauca.
- 19 January – Uniformed soldiers who were in an army base in the municipality of Teorama, Norte de Santander, were attacked in an unexpected attack by members of the ELN guerrillas. One soldier was killed and two more were injured.
- 21 January – A caravan made up of members of the National Protection Unit, along with members of the FARC political party, who were returning from a meeting in the village of El Oasis, was attacked by gunfire in the department of Arauca. One of the vehicles that was part of the caravan was incinerated and a civilian who was part of an oil company in the sector was killed in the attack.
- 27 January –
  - At least five police officers were killed and 42 others injured in a bombing attack that targeted a police station in the northern coastal city of Barranquilla.
  - In the town of Buenavista, Santa Rosa del Sur, an explosive device was hurled against the police substation in that area. The incident left two police officers dead and one injured.
  - 28 people were injured in an attack on a police station in San Lorenzo, in Northern Ecuador.
- 28 January – At least five people were injured in an attack against the police in the metropolitan area of the Colombian city of Barranquilla.
- 3 February – FARC dissidents blew up an energy tower in the southeastern Colombian department of Guaviare, which left some 22,000 people in the area without electricity.
- 4 February – Armed men threw a grenade at a house in Ituango and fired repeatedly at its facade. The incident left a 3-year-old girl dead.
- 10 February – The National Liberation Army (ELN) activated explosive charges that damaged a bridge and road in the department of Cesar (north), leaving no victims.
- 12 February –
  - Colombian soldier Jhon Jairo Delgado Bastidas was killed by guerrillas of the National Liberation Army (ELN) in the municipality of Valdivia, in the department of Antioquia.
  - The railway line of Colombia's largest coal mine, Cerrejón, was attacked with explosives that caused the suspension of trains without affecting production or exports.
- 13 February – A dead policeman, identified as mayor Jorge Sáenz Animero, and three civilians injured, is the result of an attack perpetrated by armed men in the capital of Arauca.
- 16 February – A bomb exploded in the Paloquemao sector of Bogotá. The attack did not leave people injured.
- 19 February – Two soldiers were injured in an attack by dissidents of the former Colombian FARC guerrilla against Ecuadorian soldiers on the border with Colombia.
- 21 February – At least seven peasants were injured as they crossed a minefield mined by the extinct Revolutionary Armed Forces of Colombia (FARC) guerrilla when they were carrying out coca leaf plantation removal work in the Nukak natural park in the Colombian department of Guaviare.
- 24 February – An attack by dissidents of the former Revolutionary Armed Forces of Colombia (FARC) guerrillas, on a police squad in the municipality of Puerto Rico in the department of Meta left one uniformed man dead and another wounded.
- 25 February – Three Venezuelans died in the municipality of Tibú, department of Norte de Santander, in an attack by the ELN.
- 27 February – At least five soldiers were killed and 13 wounded in a bomb attack against a Colombian army caravan in a rural area of the city of Cucuta, bordering Venezuela.
- 28 February – A new assault by the ELN with gunfire and cylinder bombs, which was registered in the rural area of Convención, killed one soldier and injured four others.
- 1 March – An ELN attack killed 2 soldiers and 3 others were injured in Convención.
- 3 March – Two policemen were killed in an attack with explosives on the road from Caldono to Siberia in the department of Cauca.

=== 2020s ===
==== 2021 ====
- 21 January – FARC dissidents clash with Venezuelan authorities.
- 3 March – A military operation kills ten FARC dissidents.

==== 2022 ====
- 2 January – Arauca Clashes
- 2 September – A FARC dissident faction detonated a roadside bomb in San Luis, Huila Department, hitting a police vehicle and killing 7 officers and injuring one.

==== 2024 ====
- September 17 - Suspected ELN rebels bomb an army base near Puerto Jordan, Arauca Department, killing 2 and injuring 23, leading to a suspension of peace talks.

==== 2025 ====
- January – 2025 Catatumbo clashes
- August 2-28 – Organized wave of attacks across regions
  - August 2: Armed strike by ELN in Chocó Department that killed at least six civilians and displaced hundreds.
  - August 6: FARC dissidents (EMC) detonated an IED against an army convoy, killing 8 soldiers and 2 police officers.
  - August 10: ELN ambushed police in Catatumbo (Norte de Santander), killing 11 officers.
  - August 14: Dissidents carried out a drone bombing on a police station in Valle del Cauca, killing 5 officers and injuring civilians.
  - August 21: Heavy fighting in Cauca Department left at least 18 dead.
  - August 28: ELN mortared a naval patrol in Tumaco, killing 7 marines.
- June 11-13 – In the Cauca and Valle del Cauca regions, at least 24 violent attacks occurred including bombings, grenade assaults, and shootings attributed to FARC dissidents (EMC), resulting in several deaths, dozens of injuries, and significant urban disruption.
  - June 13: A FARC dissident group publicly claimed responsibility for attacks in Cali and nearby areas, where coordinated operations involving vehicles with explosives, drones, and gunfire killed 7 people (including 2 police) and injured around 28.
- September 14 – FARC dissidents attacked a police station in Carmelo, Cauca, using gunfire and grenades, killing one officer and injuring four others; attackers reportedly used civilians as shields.

==== 2026 ====
- April 25 - 2026 Cauca bombing, 20 people are killed and 36 are injured by a bomb on the Pan-American Highway in Cajibío.

== See also ==
- Timeline of Colombian history
