= Colombian conflict =

Low-intensity asymmetric war in Colombia

War in Colombia
- Part of the Cold War, the war on drugs, the Illegal drug trade in Latin America and spillovers of the war on terror, the Mexican drug war and the crisis in Venezuela
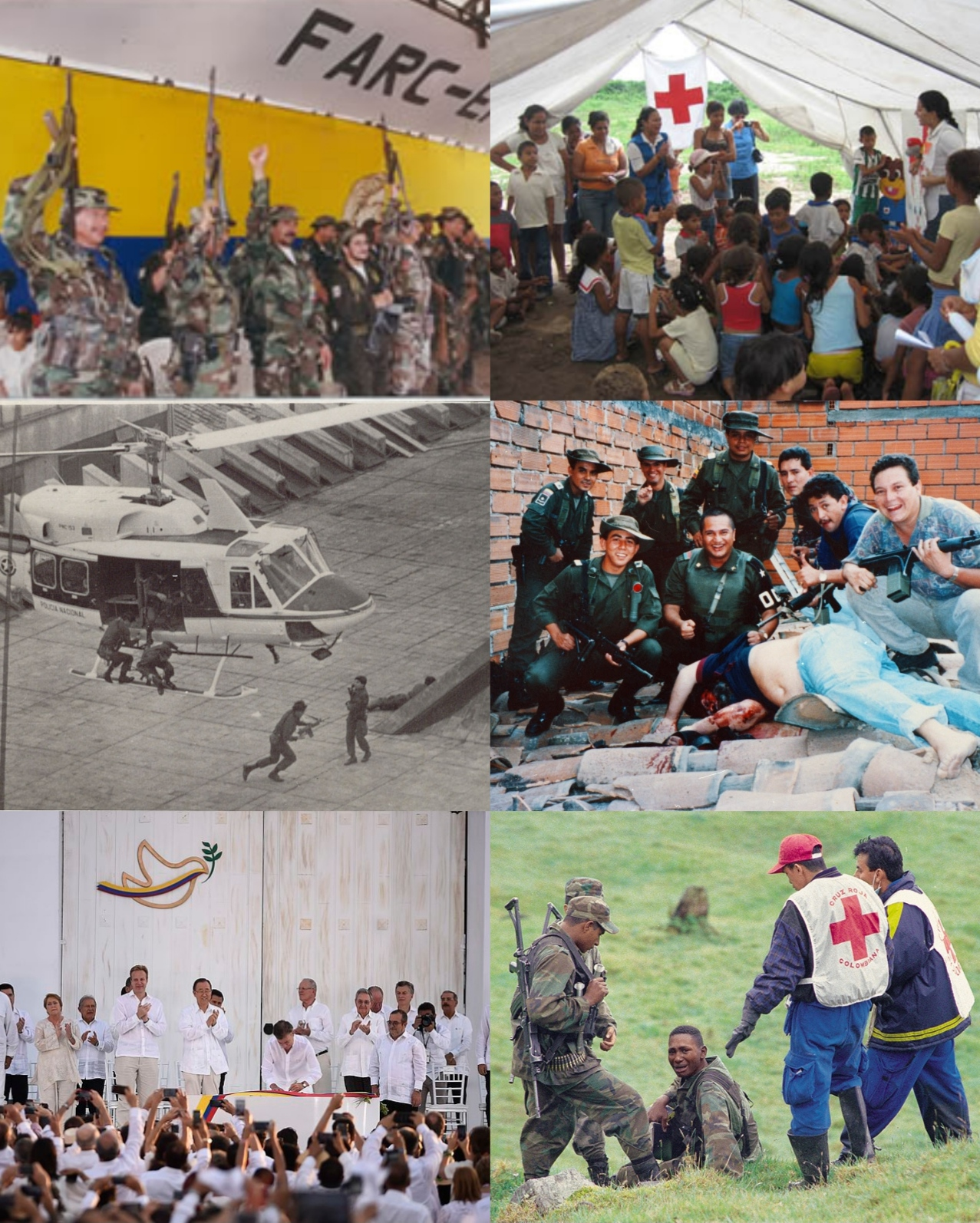
- Top left: FARC guerrillas during the Caguán dialogues. Top right: Displaced people. Center left: National Police during the Palace of Justice siege. Center right: Death of Pablo Escobar. Bottom left: Peace talks during the government of Juan Manuel Santos. Bottom right: Fredy Iturre Klínger (center) cries after seeing his half-brother killed in the Battle of Gutiérrez, 1999.
Date	May 27, 1964 – present (62 years, 5 months, 3 weeks and 1 day)
Location	Colombia and Venezuela with spillovers into Peru, Brazil, Panama, Ecuador and Paraguay
Status	Ongoing; Colombia–FARC peace deal in 2016; Start of Catatumbo campaign in 2018
Territorial changes	El Caguán DMZ (1999–2002)

Belligerents
Colombia; Venezuela (since October 2026 partially; reported military operations against the ELN); Supported by: Peru; Panama; Mexico; Brazil; Ecuador; United States; Spain; United Kingdom	Colombian cartels and paramilitaries: La Oficina (1993–); Clan del Golfo (AGC) (2001–); Los Rastrojos (2004–); Los Pachenca (2006–); Black Eagles (2006–2011); Ex-FARC Mafia (since 2016 or 2017); Comandos de la Frontera (2020–); AUC (1997–2008); AAA (1978–1999); CONVIVIR (1994–2007); ACCU (1964–2009); Los Paisas (2008–2014); Libertadores del Vichada (2010–2017); Bloque Meta (2010–2017); Tren de Aragua; ERPAC (1964–2010); Cali Cartel (1975–1995); Medellín Cartel (1972–1993); Norte del Valle Cartel (1985–2008); North Coast Cartel (1980–2010); MAS (1981–1990); La Empresa (1990–); La Guajira Cartel (1990–); Supported by: Contras (1979–1990); Mexican cartels: Sinaloa Cartel (1990–); Tijuana Cartel (1987–); CJNG (2009–); Gulf Cartel (1986–); Juárez Cartel (1989–); Los Zetas (1997–); BLO (2008–2014); Guadalajara Cartel (1978–1989); LFM (1980s–2011); Milenio Cartel (1995–2010)	Colombian rebel guerrilla groups: FARC dissidents (2016–); CGSB (1987–1990); FARC (1964–2017); FARIP (1987–1996); M-19 (1974–1990); UC-ELN (1964–); MOEC (1964–1995); ERP (1985–2007); ERG (1964–2008); EPL/Los Pelusos (1967–); ERC (1964–1992); PRT (1964–1991); MAQL (1984–1991); Supported by: Venezuela (1999–present); Cuba (1959-present); Belarus (from 2008); Nicaragua (alleged); Libya (until 2011); Soviet Union (until 1989); Albania (financial support; 1960s–1970s); Cartel of the Suns (alleged); FBL; Shining Path (factions); ETA (1964–2018); PIRA (1969–1998); PKK

Commanders and leaders
(Colombia) Abelardo de la Espriella; (Colombia) Jorge Eduardo Mora; (Colombia) Hugo Alejandro López; Former commanders: (Colombia) Guillermo León Valencia; (Colombia) Carlos Lleras Restrepo; (Colombia) Misael Pastrana Borrero; (Colombia) Alfonso López Michelsen; (Colombia) Julio César Turbay Ayala; (Colombia) Belisario Betancur; (Colombia) Virgilio Barco Vargas; (Colombia) César Gaviria; (Colombia) Ernesto Samper; (Colombia) Andrés Pastrana Arango; (Colombia) Álvaro Uribe; (Colombia) Juan Manuel Santos; (Colombia) Iván Duque; (Colombia) Gustavo Petro; (Colombia) Gabriel Rebeiz Pizarro; (Colombia) Gerardo Ayerbe Chaux; (Colombia) Hernando Currea Cubides; (Colombia) Abraham Varón Valencia; (Colombia) Luis Carlos Camacho Leyva; (Colombia) Fernando Landazábal Reyes; (Colombia) Gustavo Matamoros D'Costa; (Colombia) Miguel Vega Uribe; (Colombia) Rafael Samudio Molina; (Colombia) Manuel Jaime Guerrero Paz; (Colombia) Oscar Botero Restrepo; (Colombia) Rafael Pardo Rueda; (Colombia) Fernando Botero Zea; (Colombia) Juan Carlos Esguerra; (Colombia) Guillermo González; (Colombia) Gilberto Echeverri Mejía; (Colombia) Rodrigo Hernán Lloreda Caicedo; (Colombia) Luis Fernando Ramírez; (Colombia) Gustavo Bell; (Colombia) Marta Lucía Ramírez; (Colombia) Jorge Alberto Uribe; (Colombia) Camilo Ospina Bernal; (Colombia) Freddy Padilla de León; (Colombia) Gabriel Silva Luján; (Colombia) Rodrigo Rivera Salazar; (Colombia) Juan Carlos Pinzón; (Colombia) Luis Carlos Villegas Echeverri; (Colombia) Guillermo Botero; (Colombia) Luis Fernando Navarro Jiménez; (Colombia) Carlos Holmes Trujillo; (Colombia) Diego Molano Aponte; (Colombia) Iván Velásquez Gómez; (Colombia) Hernando Camilo Zuniga; (Colombia) Holdan Delgado; (Colombia) Harold Bedoya Pizarro; (Colombia) Jorge Enrique Mora; (Colombia) Carlos Ospina Ovalle; (Colombia) Edgar Cely; (Colombia) Alejandro Navas; (Colombia) Leonardo Barrero; (Colombia) Juan Pablo Rodríguez Barragán; (Colombia) Alberto José Mejía Ferrero; (Colombia) Helder Giraldo; (Colombia) Francisco Cubides	Fidel Castaño †; Carlos Castaño †; Vicente Castaño; Rodrigo Tovar Pupo; Salvatore Mancuso; Diego Murillo; Daniel Rendón Herrera; Medellín cartel: Pablo Escobar † (1980 - 1993) José Rodríguez †	Iván Márquez; Joaquín Gómez; Mauricio Jaramillo; Alfonso Cano †; Antonio García; Francisco Galán

Strength
National Police: 175,250; Army: 237,567; Navy: 33,913; Air Force: 14,033	Paramilitary successor groups, including the Black Eagles: 3,749–13,000	FARC: 13,980 (2016); ELN: 1,380–3,000 (2013); EPL: 400 (2017); FARC dissidents: 2,500 (2021)

Casualties and losses
(Colombia) Army and Police: 4,908 killed since 2004; 20,001 injured since 2004	AUC: 2,200 killed 35,000 demobilized BACRIM: 222 killed 18,506 captured Medellín Cartel: 2,100 killed	FARC, ELN and other irregular military groups: 11,484 killed since 2004; 26,648 demobilized since 2002; 34,065 captured since 2004
- Civilians killed: 177,307; People abducted: 27,023; Total people displaced: 4,744,046–5,712,506; Number of refugees: 340,000; Total dead: 450,000

The Colombian conflict (Spanish: Conflicto armado interno de Colombia, lit. 'Colombian internal armed conflict') began on May 27, 1964, and is a low-intensity asymmetric war between the government of Colombia, paramilitary groups, crime syndicates, and far-left guerrilla groups engaged in armed factional hostilities to increase their influence in Colombian territory. Some of the most important international contributors to the Colombian conflict include multinational corporations, the United States, Cuba, and the drug trafficking industry.

The conflict is historically rooted in the conflict known as La Violencia, which was triggered by the 1948 assassination of liberal political leader Jorge Eliécer Gaitán and in the aftermath of the anti-communist repression in rural Colombia in the 1960s that led Liberal and Communist militants to re-organize into the Revolutionary Armed Forces of Colombia (FARC).

The reasons for fighting vary from group to group. The FARC and other guerrilla movements claim to be fighting for the rights of the impoverished in Colombia to protect them from government violence and to provide social justice through communism. The Colombian government claims to be fighting for order and stability, and to protect the rights and interests of its citizens. The paramilitary groups claim to be reacting to perceived threats by guerrilla movements.

According to a study by Colombia's National Centre for Historical Memory, 220,000 people died in the conflict between 1958 and 2013, most of them civilians (177,307 civilians and 40,787 fighters), and more than five million civilians were forced from their homes between 1985 and 2012, generating the world's second-largest population of internally displaced persons (IDPs). 16.9% of the population in Colombia has been a direct victim of the war. 2.3 million children have been displaced from their homes and 45,000 children have been killed, according to national figures cited by UNICEF. In total, one in three of the 7.6 million registered victims of the conflict are children and 8,000 minors have disappeared since 1985. A Special Unit was created to search for persons deemed as missing within the context of and due to the armed conflict. As of April 2022, the Single Registry of Victims reported 9,263,826 victims of the Colombian conflict, with 2,048,563 of them being children.

Approximately 80% of those killed in the conflict have been civilians. In 2022, the Truth Commission of Colombia estimated that paramilitaries were responsible for 45% of civilian deaths, the guerrillas for 27%, and state forces for 12%, with the remaining 16% attributable to other groups or mixed responsibility.

On June 23, 2016, the Colombian government and the FARC rebels signed a historic ceasefire deal, bringing them closer to ending more than five decades of conflict. Although the agreement was rejected in the subsequent October plebiscite, the same month, then-president of Colombia Juan Manuel Santos was awarded the Nobel Peace Prize for his efforts to bring the country's more than 50-year-long civil war to an end. A revised peace deal was signed the following month and submitted to Congress for approval. The House of Representatives unanimously approved the plan on November 30, a day after the Senate gave its backing.

== Background ==
The origin of the armed conflict in Colombia goes back to 1920, with agrarian disputes over the Sumapaz and Tequendama regions. Much of the background of the Colombian conflict is rooted in La Violencia, a conflict in which liberal and leftist parties united against the dictator of Colombia, Gustavo Rojas Pinilla. At the time, Colombia was a banana republic dominated by foreign monopolies, specifically the United Fruit Company.

The United Fruit Company existed to buy large quantities of agricultural products in Latin America at cheap prices, then resell the crops in foreign markets for inflated amounts. Local farmers were impoverished and forced to grow specific crops, creating a monoculture in which farmers depended on the company for all food, products, and wages. The United Fruit Company would usually pay its workers in coupons that were worthless outside company stores, which would further charge extravagant prices compared to what workers earned. Further, the employment system was usually one in which farmers would be forced to sell their property to the United Fruit Company. They ended up having to work on the land, becoming indebted to the company and having to pay it back.

The United Fruit Company would hire private militaries to enforce its power. Their purpose was to put down worker calls for reform, destroy unions, and put down worker revolutions. Any potential government threat to the United Fruit Company's interests in the country would result in its overturning in a company-backed coup. It propped up friendly puppet politicians and supported right-wing militias to maintain power.

Workers often organized and went on strike against these conditions, forming local militias against the United Fruit Company. This would usually lead to conflict between the two sides, which culminated in a strike in November 1928 by farmers in Ciénaga for better working conditions. The striking workers called for an end to temporary contracts, the creation of mandatory worker insurance, the creation of compensation for work accidents, the creation of hygienic dormitories, a 6-day work week, the implementation of a minimum wage, the abolishment of wages through company coupons and office stores, and the recognition of farmers and tenants as employees with legal rights. The strike quickly grew, becoming the largest in Colombia's history, with many socialists, anarchists, Marxists, and leftists joining and organizing the strike. The United Fruit Company demanded that the workers and the union disband. Following several weeks of failed negotiations, the Colombian government of Miguel Abadía Méndez sent the Colombian Army to Ciénaga. After a standoff with the strikers, the Army shot into the crowd of strikers, killing between 68 and 2,000 people, in what became known as the Banana Massacre.

This led to an outrage in the Colombian public, creating an explosion of leftist and revolutionary organizations. In Bogotá, leftist students protested and organized against the Colombian government, eventually hoping to overthrow it. This opposition exploded in 1948. Upon hearing of the assassination of socialist candidate Jorge Eliécer Gaitán, many poor workers saw the death of Gaitán as a political assassination orchestrated by the rich. Workers began rioting and destroying the Colombian capital of Bogotá, leading to the death of 4,000 people. When news of the death of Gaitán reached the countryside, the local militias were furious and immediately started a civil war, known as La Violencia. Joined by fellow leftists, a brutal war was fought for over 10 years, leading to the death of 200,000 people and the destruction of much of the country, resulting in a peace settlement and the changing of power from the Colombian Conservative Party to the Colombian Liberal Party and the Colombian Communist Party in 1958.

As La Violencia wound down, most self-defense and guerrilla units composed of Liberal Party supporters were demobilized. At the same time, some former liberals and active communist groups continued operating in several rural enclaves. One of the Liberal bands was a group known as the "Fuerzas Armadas Revolucionarias de Colombia" (Revolutionary Armed Forces of Colombia), or FARC, formed by Pedro Antonio Marín in 1964. The FARC was founded out of fighters who were unhappy with the peace settlement. The goal of the FARC, among other things, was land redistribution that would benefit poor peasant farmers like Marín, along with the desire to establish a socialist state.

In 1958, an exclusively bipartisan political alternation system, known as the National Front, resulted from an agreement between the Liberal and Conservative parties. The agreement had come as a result of the two parties attempting to find a final political solution to a decade of mutual violence and unrest, remaining in effect until 1974.

== Causes ==
Colombia has a long history of political violence. Land, power, and wealth were unevenly distributed and many rural citizens were used to having to fend for themselves. There is no consensus about the date on which the conflict began, with some saying 1958 (with the start of the Frente Nacional (National Front)) and others 1964 (with the creation of the FARC).

In the mid-1980s, Colombia granted local governments greater political and fiscal autonomy. This strengthened the government's position in more remote regions.

In 1985, during peace talks with then-President Belisario Betancur, the FARC created the left-wing Patriotic Union party as a route from violence to mainstream politics. Between 1985 and 2002, 4,153 members and supporters of the party were kidnapped and murdered by right-wing paramilitaries with government support. This included two presidential candidates, 6 out of 16 congressmembers, 17 regional representatives, and 163 councilmembers. These killings aggravated the conflict.

In the 1980s, drug trafficking increased, bringing a concomitant increase in violence. Trafficking began in the 1960s and 70s when a group of Americans began to smuggle marijuana. Later, the American Mafia moved into drug trafficking in Colombia alongside local marijuana producers. Cocaine and other drugs produced in Colombia were mostly consumed in the US, as well as Europe.

Organized crime in Colombia grew increasingly powerful in the 1970s and 80s with the introduction of massive drug trafficking to the United States from Colombia. After the Colombian government dismantled many of the drug cartels that appeared in the country during the 1980s, left-wing guerrilla groups, and right-wing paramilitary organizations resumed some of their drug trafficking activities. They resorted to extortion and kidnapping for their financing: activities which led to a loss of support from the local population. These funds helped finance paramilitaries and guerrillas, allowing these organizations to buy weapons which were then sometimes used to attack military and civilian targets. Natural resources were found to be correlated with the conflict, while higher per capita income and public investment were associated with reduced conflict intensity.

During the presidency of Álvaro Uribe, the government applied more military pressure on the FARC and other outlawed far-left groups. After the offensive, many security indicators improved. As part of a controversial peace process, the AUC (a right-wing paramilitary group) as a formal organization had ceased to function. Colombia achieved a considerable reduction in cocaine production, leading White House drug czar R. Gil Kerlikowske to announce that Colombia was no longer the world's biggest producer of cocaine.

In February 2008, millions of Colombians demonstrated against the FARC and other outlawed groups. The Colombian Ministry of Defense reported 19,504 deserters from the FARC between August 2002 and their collective demobilization in 2017, peaking in the year 2008. During these years, the military forces of the Republic of Colombia were strengthened.

The 2012 Colombian peace process refers to the dialogue in Havana, Cuba between the Colombian government and the FARC-EP to find a political solution to the armed conflict. After almost four years of peace negotiations, the Colombian state and the FARC announced consenus on a 6-point plan towards peace and reconciliation. The government also began a process of assistance and reparation for victims of the conflict. Recently, U.P. supporters reconstituted the political party within the reconciliation process. Colombia's congress approved the revised peace accord.

In February 2015, the Historical Commission on the Conflict and its Victims (Comisión Histórica del Conflicto Armado y sus Víctimas – CHCV) published a report entitled "Contribution to an Understanding of the Armed Conflict in Colombia." The document addresses the "multiple reasons for the conflict, the principle factors and circumstances that made it possible, and the most notable impacts on the population", and explains Colombia's armed conflict in terms of international law.

== Timeline ==
=== 1960s ===
During the 1960s, the main conflict in Colombia was between leftist guerillas and the central government. Key concerns included access to land, the battle between communist and far-right ideologies, and the marginalization of peasant populations.

In the early 1960s, Colombian Army units loyal to the National Front began to attack peasant communities. This happened throughout Colombia, with the Colombian army deeming these peasant communities as enclaves for bandits and communists. It was the 1964 attack on the community of Marquetalia that motivated the later creation of FARC. Despite the infantry and police encirclement of the villages inside Marquetalia (3,500 men swept through the area), Manuel Marulanda managed to escape the army cordon.

Unlike the rural FARC, which had roots in previous Liberal peasant struggles, the National Liberation Army (ELN) was mostly an outgrowth of university unrest. It would subsequently tend to follow a small group of charismatic leaders, including Camilo Torres Restrepo. Both guerrilla groups remained mostly operational in remote areas of the country during the rest of the 1960s.

The Colombian government organized several short-lived counter-guerrilla campaigns in the late 1950s and early 1960s. The U.S. government and the CIA aided these efforts, which employed hunter-killer teams and involved U.S. personnel from the previous Philippine campaign against the Huks, who would later participate in the subsequent Phoenix Program in the Vietnam War.

=== 1970s ===
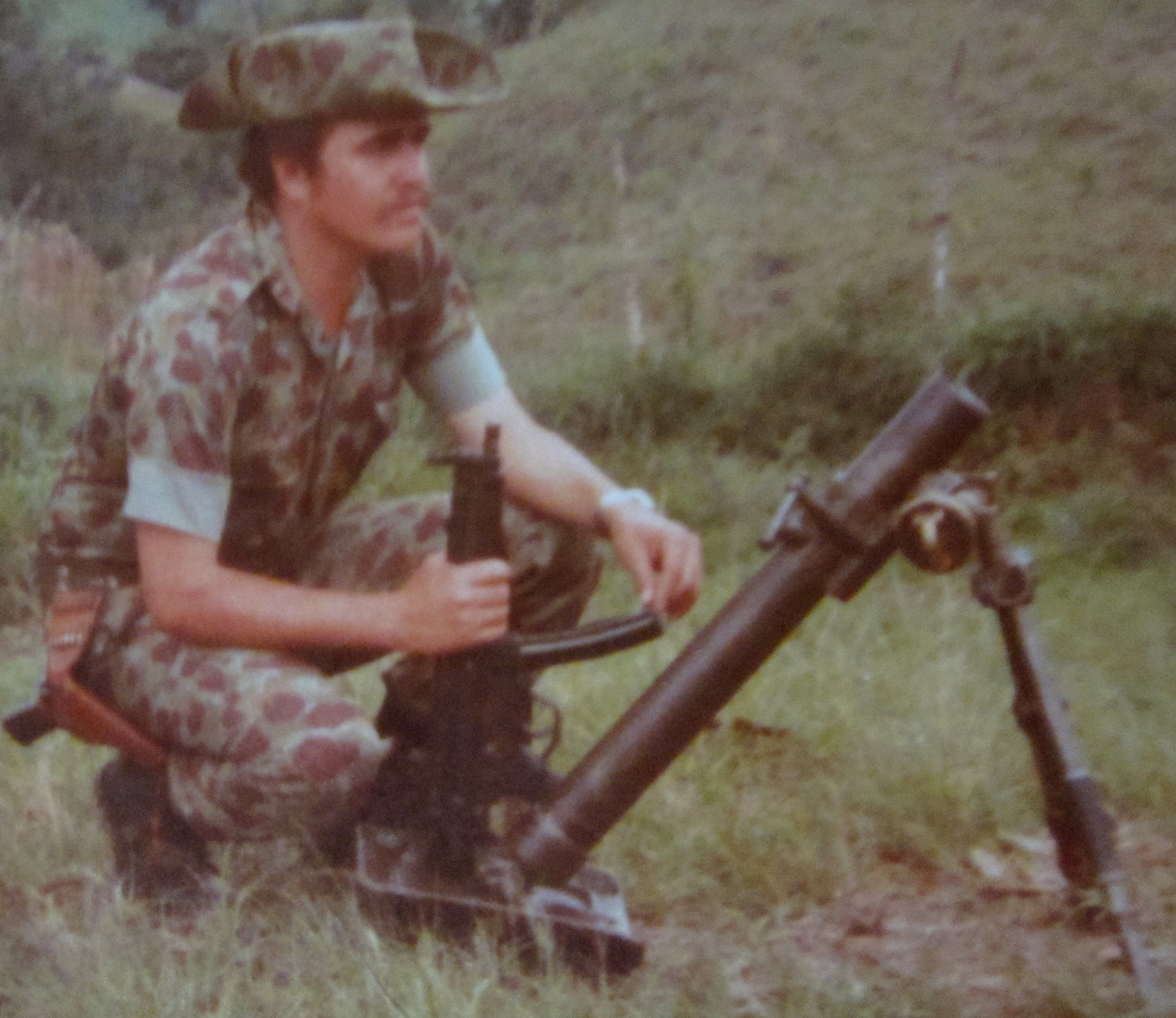
Colombian soldier

By 1974, another challenge to the state's authority and legitimacy came from the 19th of April Movement (M-19), leading to a new phase in the conflict. The M-19 was a mostly urban guerrilla group, founded in response to alleged electoral fraud during the final National Front election of Misael Pastrana Borrero (1970–1974) against former President Gustavo Rojas Pinilla.

=== 1980s ===
By 1982, the perceived passivity of the FARC, together with the relative success of the government's efforts against the M-19 and the ELN, enabled the administration of the Liberal Party's Julio César Turbay Ayala (1978–82) to lift a state-of-siege decree that had been in effect, on and off, for most of the previous 30 years. Under the latest such decree, President Turbay had implemented security policies that, while of some military value against the M-19 in particular, were considered highly questionable both inside and outside Colombian circles due to numerous accusations of military human rights abuses against suspects and captured guerrillas.

Citizen exhaustion due to the conflict's newfound intensity led to the election of President Belisario Betancur (1982–1986), a Conservative, with 47% of the popular vote. Betancur directed peace feelers at all the insurgents and negotiated a 1984 cease-fire with the FARC at La Uribe, Meta, after a 1982 release of many guerrillas imprisoned during the previous effort to overpower them. A truce was also arranged with the M-19. The ELN, however, rejected any negotiations and continued to rebuild through the use of extortion and threats, in particular against oil companies of European and U.S. origin.

At the same time as these developments, the growing illegal drug trade was becoming increasingly important to all participants in the Colombian conflict. Guerrillas and newly wealthy drug lords had mutually uneven relations, and numerous incidents occurred between them. Eventually, the kidnapping of drug cartel family members by guerrillas led to the creation in 1981 of the Muerte a Secuestradores ("Death to Kidnappers") death squad (MAS). The Medellín Cartel and other cartels came under pressure from the U.S. government and from critical sectors of Colombian society who supported the extradition of suspected Colombian cartel members to the U.S. The cartels responded by bribing or murdering numerous public officials, politicians, and others. Their victims included Justice Minister Rodrigo Lara Bonilla, whose assassination in 1984 led the Betancur administration to confront the drug lords directly.

The first negotiated cease-fire with the M-19 ended when the guerrillas resumed fighting in 1985. The M-19 claimed that the cease-fire had not been fully respected by official security forces, alleged that several of its members had suffered threats and assaults, and questioned the reality of the government's willingness to implement any accords. The Betancur administration in turn criticized the M-19's actions and questioned its commitment to the peace process, while at the same time continuing to advance high-profile negotiations with the FARC. These negotiations led to the creation of the Patriotic Union (Unión Patriótica, UP), a legal and non-clandestine political organization.

On November 6, 1985, the M-19 stormed the Colombian Palace of Justice and held the Supreme Court magistrates hostage, intending to put President Betancur on trial. The military responded with force and in the ensuing crossfire some 120 people lost their lives, including most of the guerrillas (several high-ranking operatives among them) and 12 Supreme Court Judges. Both sides blamed each other for the bloodbath, which marked the end of Betancur's peace process.

Meanwhile, individual FARC members initially joined the UP leadership in representation of the guerrilla command, though most of the guerrilla's chiefs and militiamen did not demobilize nor disarm, as that was not a requirement of the process at that point in time. Tension soon significantly increased, as both sides began to accuse each other of not respecting the cease-fire.

According to historian Daniel Pecáut, the creation of the Patriotic Union took the guerrillas' political message to a wider public outside of the traditional communist spheres of influence and led to local electoral victories in regions such as Urabá and Antioquia, with their mayoral candidates winning 23 municipalities and their congressional candidates gaining 14 seats (five in the Senate, nine in the lower Chamber) in 1988. Pecáut stated that new recruits entered the guerrilla army and its urban militia units during this period, and that the FARC continued to carry out kidnappings and target regional politicians for assassination. According to journalist Steven Dudley, who interviewed ex-FARC members as well as former members of the UP and the Communist Party, FARC leader Jacobo Arenas insisted to his subordinates that the UP's creation did not mean the group would lay down its arms; neither did it imply a rejection of the Seventh Conference's military strategy.

In October 1987, Jaime Pardo Leal, who had been the UP's presidential candidate the previous year, was assassinated amid a wave of violence in which thousands of the party's members perished at the hands of death squads. According to Pecáut, the killers included members of the military and the political class who opposed Betancur's peace process and considered the UP to be little more than a "facade" for the FARC, as well as drug traffickers and landowners who were involved in the establishment of paramilitary groups.

=== 1990s ===
==== Early 1990s ====
The Virgilio Barco Vargas (1986–1990) administration, in addition to continuing to handle the difficulties of the complex negotiations with the guerrillas, also inherited a particularly chaotic confrontation against the drug lords, who were engaged in a campaign of terrorism and murder in response to government moves in favor of their extradition overseas.

In June 1987, the ceasefire between FARC and the Colombian government formally collapsed after the guerrillas attacked a military unit in the jungles of Caquetá. According to journalist Steven Dudley, FARC founder Jacobo Arenas considered the incident to be a "natural" part of the truce and reiterated the group's intention to continue the dialogue, but President Barco sent an ultimatum to the guerrillas and demanded that they immediately disarm or face military retaliation. Regional guerrilla and Army skirmishes created a situation where each violation of the ceasefire rendered it null in each location, until it became practically nonexistent.

By 1990, at least 2,500 members of the FARC-founded Patriotic Union had been murdered, according to historian Daniel Pecáut, which led up to that year's assassination of presidential candidate Bernardo Jaramillo Ossa. The Colombian government initially blamed drug lord Pablo Escobar for the murder, but journalist Steven Dudley argues that many in the UP pointed at then-Interior Minister Carlos Lemos Simmonds for publicly calling out the UP as the "political wing of FARC" shortly before the murder, while others claimed it was the result of an alliance between Fidel Castaño, members of the Colombian military, and the DAS. Pecáut and Dudley argue that significant tensions had emerged between Jaramillo, FARC, and the Communist Party due to the candidate's recent criticism of the armed struggle and their debates over the rebels' use of kidnapping, almost leading to a formal break. Jaramillo's death led to a large exodus of UP militants; in addition, by then many FARC cadres who had joined the party had already returned to clandestinity, using the UP experience as an argument in favor of revolutionary war.

The M-19 and several smaller guerrilla groups were successfully incorporated into a peace process as the 1980s ended and the 1990s began, which culminated in the elections for a Constituent Assembly of Colombia that would write a new constitution, which took effect in 1991.

Contacts with the FARC, which had irregularly continued despite the end of the ceasefire and the official 1987 break from negotiations, were temporarily cut off in 1990 under the presidency of César Gaviria Trujillo (1990–1994). The Colombian Army's assault on the FARC's Casa Verde sanctuary at La Uribe, Meta, followed by a FARC offensive that sought to undermine the deliberations of the Constitutional Assembly, began to highlight a significant break in the uneven negotiations carried over from the previous decade.

Nevertheless, both parties never completely broke off some amount of political contacts for long, as some peace feelers continued to exist, leading to short rounds of conversations in both Caracas, Venezuela (1991) and Tlaxcala, Mexico (1992). Despite the signing of several documents, no concrete results were achieved when the talks ended.

==== Mid-1990s ====
FARC military activity increased throughout the bulk of the 1990s as the group continued to grow in wealth from both kidnapping and drug-related activities, while drug crops rapidly spread throughout the countryside. The guerrillas protected many of the coca growers from eradication campaigns and allowed them to grow and commercialize coca in exchange for a "tax" in either money or crops. In this context, FARC had managed to recruit and train more fighters, beginning to use them in concentrated attacks. This led to a series of high-profile raids and attacks against Colombian state bases and patrols, mostly in the southeast of Colombia but also affecting other areas.

In mid-1996, a civic protest movement made up of an estimated 200,000 coca growers from Putumayo and part of Cauca began marching against the Colombian government to reject its drug war policies, including fumigations and the declaration of special security zones in some departments. Different analysts have stressed that the movement itself fundamentally originated on its own, but at the same time, FARC heavily encouraged the marchers and actively promoted their demands both peacefully and through threats of force. Additionally, in 1997 and 1998, town councilmen in dozens of municipalities in the south of the country were threatened, killed, kidnapped, or forced to resign or exile themselves to department capitals by the FARC and the ELN.

In Las Delicias, Caquetá, five FARC fronts (about 400 guerrillas) recognized intelligence pitfalls in a Colombian Army base and exploited them to overrun it on August 30, 1996: killing 34 soldiers, wounding 17, and taking some 60 as prisoners. Another significant attack took place in El Billar, Caquetá on March 2, 1998 where a Colombian Army counterinsurgency battalion was patrolling, resulting in the death of 62 soldiers and the capture of some 43. Other FARC attacks against police bases in Miraflores, Guaviare and La Uribe, Meta in August 1998 killed more than a hundred soldiers, policemen, and civilians, and resulted in the capture or kidnapping of a hundred more.

These attacks, and the dozens of members of the Colombian security forces taken prisoner by the FARC, contributed to increasingly shaming of the government of President Ernesto Samper Pizano (1994–1998) in the sectors of public and political opinion. He was already the target of numerous critics due to revelations of a drug-money scandal surrounding his presidential campaign. Perceptions of corruption due to similar scandals led to Colombia's decertification as a country cooperating with the United States in the war on drugs in 1995 (when the effects of the measure were temporarily waived), 1996, and 1997.

The Samper administration reacted against FARC's attacks by gradually abandoning numerous vulnerable and isolated outposts in more than 100,000 km^{2} of the rural countryside, instead concentrating Army and Police forces in the more heavily defended strongholds available, which allowed the guerrillas to more directly mobilize through and influence events in large areas of rural territory which were left with little or no remaining local garrisons.

Samper also contacted the guerrillas to negotiate the release of some or all of the hostages in FARC hands, which led to the temporary demilitarization of the municipality of Cartagena del Chairá, Caquetá in July 1997 and the unilateral liberation of 70 soldiers: a move which was opposed by the command of the Colombian military. Other contacts between the guerrillas and the government, as well as with representatives of the religious and economic sectors, continued throughout 1997 and 1998.

Altogether, these events were interpreted by some Colombian and foreign analysts as a turning point in the armed confrontation, giving the FARC the upper hand in the military and political balance, making the Colombian government a target of critics from some observers who concluded that its weakness was being evidenced, perhaps even foreshadowing a future guerrilla victory in the middle term. A leaked 1998 U.S. Defense Intelligence Agency (DIA) report went so far as to speculate that this could be possible within 5 years if the guerrilla's rate of operations was kept up without effective opposition. Some viewed this report as inaccurate and alarmist, claiming that it did not properly take into account many factors, such as possible actions that the Colombian state and the U.S. might take in response to the situation, nor the effects of the existence of paramilitary groups.

Also during this period, paramilitary activities increased both legally and illegally. The creation of legal CONVIVIR self-defense and intelligence gathering groups was authorized by Congress and the Samper administration in 1994. Members of CONVIVIR groups were accused of committing numerous abuses against the civilian population by several human rights organizations. The groups were left without legal support after a 1997 decision by the Colombian Constitutional Court, which restricted many of their prerogatives and demanded stricter oversight. However, in April 1997, pre-existing paramilitary forces and several former CONVIVIR members were joined to create the AUC, a large paramilitary militia closely tied to drug trafficking which carried out attacks on the FARC and ELN rebel groups as well as civilians, starting with the 1997 Mapiripán Massacre.

The AUC, originally present around the central/northwest part of the country, executed a series of raids into areas of guerrilla influence, targeting those whom they considered to be guerrillas or their supporters. This resulted in a continuing series of massacres. After some of these operations, government prosecutors and/or human rights organizations blamed officers and members of the Colombian Army and police units for either passively permitting these acts or directly collaborating in their execution.

==== 1998–1999 ====
On August 7, 1998, Andrés Pastrana Arango was sworn in as the President of Colombia. A member of the Conservative Party, Pastrana defeated Liberal Party candidate Horacio Serpa in a run-off election marked by high voter turn-out and little political unrest. The new president's program was based on a commitment to bring about a peaceful resolution of Colombia's longstanding civil conflict and to cooperate fully with the United States to combat the trafficking of illegal drugs.

In July 1999, Colombian military forces attacked the town of Puerto Lleras where FARC rebels were stationed. Using U.S. supplied aircraft and equipment, and backed with U.S. logistical support, Colombian government forces strafed and bombed the town for over 72 hours. In the attack, three civilians were killed and several others were wounded as the military attacked hospitals, churches, ambulances, and residential areas. FARC rebels were forced to flee the area and many were killed or wounded. The Colombian government claimed that this was a significant victory, while human rights groups claimed this was proof that "anti-narcotics" aid was actually just military aid being used to fight a leftist insurgency.

=== 2000–2006 ===
The years from 2000 to 2006 were bloody ones in Colombia with thousands of deaths every year resulting from the ongoing war between the Colombian Armed Forces, Paramilitary groups such as the AUC, and the rebel groups (mainly the FARC, ELN and the EPL). The fighting resulted in massive internal displacement of Colombia's civilian population and thousands of civilian deaths.

During President Uribe's first term in office (2002–2006), the security situation inside Colombia showed some measure of improvement, and the economy, while still fragile, showed some positive signs of recovery, according to observers. However, relatively little had been accomplished in structurally solving the country's other grave problems, such as poverty and inequality, possibly in part due to legislative and political conflicts between the administration and the Colombian Congress (including those over a controversial project to eventually give Uribe the possibility of re-election) and a relative lack of freely allocated funds and credits.

Some critical observers considered that Uribe's policies, while reducing crime and guerrilla activity, were too slanted in favor of a military solution to Colombia's internal war, while neglecting grave social and human rights concerns. Critics asked for Uribe's government to change this position and make serious efforts towards improving the human rights situation inside the country, protecting civilians, and reducing any abuses committed by the armed forces. Political dissenters and labor union members, among others, suffered from threats and have been murdered.

In 2001, the largest government-supported paramilitary group, the AUC, which had been linked to drug trafficking and attacks on civilians, was added to the US State Department's list of Foreign Terrorist Organizations, and the European Union and Canada soon followed suit.

On January 17, 2001, right-wing paramilitaries entered the village of Chengue, and divided up the villagers into two groups. They then went from person to person in one of the groups, smashing each person's head with sledgehammers and rocks, killing 24 people, as the Colombian military sat by and watched. Two other bodies were later discovered dumped in a shallow grave. As the paramilitaries left, they set fire to the village.

In 2004, it was revealed by the National Security Archive that a 1991 document from the U.S. Defense Intelligence Agency had described then-Senator Uribe as a "close personal friend" and collaborator of Pablo Escobar. The Uribe administration denied several of the allegations in the 1991 report.

A disarmament process of Colombia's paramilitary groups (especially the AUC) was begun in 2004 and was completed on April 12, 2006 when 1,700 fighters turned in their weapons in the town of Casibare.

In May 2006, the Colombian presidential election resulted in Uribe winning re-election with a historic first round vote tally of 62%, followed by leftist Carlos Gaviria with 22% and Horacio Serpa with 11%.

=== 2007–2009 ===
On June 28, 2007, the FARC suddenly reported the death of 11 of the 12 kidnapped provincial deputies from Valle del Cauca Department. The Colombian government accused the FARC of executing the hostages and stated that government forces had not made any rescue attempts. FARC claimed that the deaths occurred during a crossfire, after an attack on one of its camps by an "unidentified military group". FARC did not report any other casualties on either side.

In 2007, Venezuelan President Hugo Chávez and Colombian Senator Piedad Córdoba were acting as authorised mediators in the ongoing humanitarian exchange between the FARC and the government of Colombia. Colombian President Álvaro Uribe had given Chávez permission to mediate under the conditions that all meetings with the FARC would take place in Venezuela and that Chávez would not contact members of the Colombian military directly but instead would go through proper diplomatic channels. However, President Uribe abruptly terminated Chávez's mediation efforts on November 22, 2007, after Chávez personally contacted General Mario Montoya Uribe, the Commander of the Colombian National Army. In response, Chávez said that he was still willing to mediate, but had withdrawn Venezuela's ambassador to Colombia and placed Colombian-Venezuelan relations "in a freezer". President Uribe responded by accusing Chávez of legitimizing terrorism and pursuing an expansionist project on the continent.

Several scandals affected Uribe's administration; the Colombian parapolitics scandal expanded during his second term, involving numerous members of the administration's ruling coalition. Many pro-government lawmakers, such as the President's cousin Mario Uribe, were also investigated for their possible ties to paramilitary organizations.

At the end of 2007, FARC agreed to release former senator Consuelo González, politician Clara Rojas, and her son Emmanuel, born in captivity after a relationship with one of her captors. Operation Emmanuel was proposed and set up by Venezuelan President Hugo Chávez, with the permission of the Colombian government. The mission was approved on December 26; however, on December 31, FARC claimed that the hostage release had been delayed because of Colombian military operations. At the same time, Colombian President Álvaro Uribe indicated that FARC had not freed the three hostages because Emmanuel may not be in their hands anymore. Two FARC gunmen were taken prisoner.

Colombian authorities added that a boy matching Emmanuel's description had been taken to a hospital in San José del Guaviare in June 2005. The child was in poor condition; one of his arms was hurt, he had severe malnutrition, and he had diseases that are commonly suffered in the jungle. Having been evidently mistreated, the boy was later sent to a foster home in Bogotá, and DNA tests were announced to confirm his identity.

On January 4, 2008, the results of a mitochondrial DNA test, comparing the child's DNA with that of his potential grandmother, Clara de Rojas, were revealed by the Colombian government. It was reported that there was a very high probability that the boy was indeed part of the Rojas family. The same day, FARC released a communique in which they admitted that Emmanuel had been taken to Bogotá and "left in the care of honest persons" for safety reasons until a humanitarian exchange took place. The group accused President Uribe of "kidnapping" the child to sabotage his liberation. However, on January 10, 2008, FARC released Rojas and Gonzalez through a humanitarian commission headed by the International Committee of the Red Cross.

On January 13, 2008, Venezuelan President Hugo Chávez stated his disapproval with the FARC strategy of armed struggle and kidnapping saying, "I don't agree with kidnapping and I don't agree with armed struggle". He repeated his call for a political solution and an end to the war in March and June 2008: "The guerrilla war is history...At this moment in Latin America, an armed guerrilla movement is out of place".

In February 2008, FARC released four other political hostages "as a gesture of goodwill" toward Chávez, who had brokered the deal and sent Venezuelan helicopters with Red Cross logos into the Colombian jungle to pick up the freed hostages.

On March 1, 2008, the Colombian armed forces launched a military operation 1.8 kilometres into Ecuador on a FARC position, killing 24, including Raúl Reyes, member of the FARC Central High Command. This led to the 2008 Andean diplomatic crisis between Colombia and Ecuadorian President Rafael Correa, supported by Venezuelan President Hugo Chávez. On March 3, Iván Ríos, also a member of the FARC Central High Command was killed by his security chief, "Rojas". In March 2008 alone, FARC lost 3 members of their Secretariat, including their founder.

On May 24, 2008, Colombian magazine, Revista Semana, published an interview with Colombian Defense Minister Juan Manuel Santos in which Santos mentioned the death of Manuel Marulanda Vélez. The news was confirmed by FARC-commander "Timochenko" on Venezuelan-based television station Telesur on May 25, 2008. "Timochenko" announced the new commander in chief as "Alfonso Cano".

In May 2008, a dozen jailed paramilitary leaders were extradited to the United States on drug-related charges. In 2009, extradited paramilitary leader Salvatore Mancuso would go on to claim that the AUC had supported Uribe's 2002 election, but said it was a result of their similar "ideological discourse" and not the result of any direct prior arrangement.

On July 2, 2008, the Colombian armed forces launched Operation Jaque which resulted in the freedom of 15 political hostages, including former Colombian presidential candidate Íngrid Betancourt, Marc Gonsalves, Thomas Howes, and Keith Stansell, three American military contractors employed by Northrop Grumman, and 11 Colombian military and police members. Two FARC members were arrested. This trick to the FARC was presented by the Colombian government as proof that the guerrilla organisation and its influence was declining.

On October 26, 2008, after 8 years of captivity, the ex-congressman Óscar Tulio Lizcano escaped with the assistance of a FARC rebel he had convinced to travel with him. Soon after the liberation of this prominent political hostage, the Vice President of Colombia Francisco Santos Calderón called Latin America's biggest guerrilla group a "paper tiger" with little control over the nation's territory, adding that, "they have really been diminished to the point where we can say they are a minimal threat to Colombian security" and "after six years of going after them, reducing their income and promoting reinsertion of most of their members, they look like a paper tiger." However, he warned against any kind of premature triumphalism, because "crushing the rebels will take time." The 500,000 square kilometers (190,000 sq mi) of jungle in Colombia made it hard to track them down to fight.

According to the Colombian government, in early 2009 FARC launched plan "Rebirth" to avoid being defeated; they planned to intensify guerrilla warfare by the use of landmines, snipers, and bomb attacks in urban areas. They also planned to buy missiles to fight the Colombian Air Force which had highly contributed to their weakness in the past.

- In February 2009, the guerrilla group released 6 hostages as a humanitarian gesture. In March, they released Swedish hostage Erik Roland Larsson.
- In April 2009, the Colombian armed forces launched "Strategic Leap", an offensive in border areas where the FARC's forces still had a strong military presence, especially in Arauca, near the Venezuelan border.
- In November 2009, nine Colombian soldiers were killed when their post was attacked by FARC guerrillas in a southwestern part of the country.
- On December 22, 2009, FARC rebels raided the home of Provincial governor Luis Francisco Cuéllar, killing one police officer and wounding two. Cuéllar was found dead the following day.

=== 2010–2016 ===
On January 1, 2010, 18 FARC rebels were killed when the Colombian Air Force bombed a jungle camp in southern Colombia. Colombian troops of the elite Task Force Omega then stormed the camp, capturing 15 FARC rebels, as well as 25 rifles, war materials, explosives, and information which was given to military intelligence. In southwestern Colombia, FARC rebels ambushed an army patrol, killing a soldier: the troops then exchanged fire with the rebels. During the fighting, a teenager was killed in the crossfire.

When Juan Manuel Santos was elected president in August 2010, he promised to "continue the armed offensive" against rebel movements. In the month after his inauguration, FARC and ELN killed roughly 50 soldiers and policemen in attacks all over Colombia. September also saw the killing of FARC's second-in-command Mono Jojoy. By the end of 2010, it became increasingly clear that "neo-paramilitary groups", referred to as "criminal groups" (BACRIM) by the government, had become an increasing threat to national security, with violent groups such as Los Rastrojos and Aguilas Negras taking control of large parts of the Colombian countryside.

In 2010, the FARC killed at least 460 members of the security forces, while wounding more than 2,000.

By early 2011, Colombian authorities and news media reported that FARC and its clandestine sister groups had partly shifted their strategy from guerrilla warfare to "a war of militias", meaning they were increasingly operating in civilian clothes while hiding amongst sympathizers in the civilian population. In early January 2011, the Colombian army said that FARC had some 18,000 members, with 9,000 of those forming part of the militias. The army claimed to have "identified" at least 1,400 such militia members in the FARC strongholds of Valle del Cauca and Cauca in 2011. In June 2011, Colombian chief of staff Edgar Cely claimed that FARC wanted to "urbanize their actions", which could partly explain the increased guerrilla activity in Medellín, and particularly Cali. Jeremy McDermott, co-director of InSight Crime, estimated in 2011 that FARC may have some 30,000 "part-time fighters", with supporters making up the rebel militia network instead of armed uniformed combatants.

Also in 2011, the Colombian Congress issued a statement claiming that FARC had a "strong presence" in roughly one third of Colombia, while their attacks against security forces "continued to rise" throughout 2010 and 2011.

In 2012, the Colombia Military launched the Espada de Honor War Plan, an aggressive counterinsurgency strategy aiming to dismantle FARC's structure, both militarily and financially. The plan targeted FARC leadership and focused on eliminating 15 of the most powerful economic and military fronts.

=== 2013-2016 ===
- On July 20, 2013, as peace talks were making progress, two rebel attacks on government positions killed 19 soldiers and an unspecified number of combatants. It was the deadliest day since the peace talks began in November 2012.
- On December 15, 2014, 9 FARC guerrillas were killed in the aftermath of airstrikes conducted by the Colombian Air Force in the Meta province.
- On May 22, 2015, FARC suspended a truce after 26 of its fighters were killed in a government air and ground offensive.
- On June 22, 2015, a Colombian Army Black Hawk helicopter was destroyed while landing on a mine field laid by FARC. Four soldiers were killed and six were wounded.
- On June 23, 2016, the Colombian government and FARC agreed to a ceasefire. A "final, full and definitive accord" was agreed to on August 24, 2016, which did not include the ELN.
- On October 2, 2016, the results of the referendum to decide whether or not to support the peace accord showed that 50.2% opposed the accord while 49.8% favoured it.
- In October 2016, President Juan Manuel Santos was awarded the Nobel Peace Prize for his resolute efforts to bring the country's more than 50-year-long war to an end.
- On November 24, 2016, the Colombian government and FARC signed a revised peace deal and the revised agreement would be submitted to Congress for approval.
- On November 30, the House of Representatives unanimously approved the plan one day after the Senate also gave its backing.

=== 2017–2019 ===
In September 2019, Colombia's President Iván Duque Márquez launched a new military crackdown against FARC, which declared the resumption of the armed struggle due to the government's failure to abide by the 2016 peace deal.

=== 2020–present ===
On April 25, 2020, senior Clan del Golfo leader, Gustavo Adolfo Álvarez Téllez, who was one of Colombia's most wanted drug lords with a 580 million peso bounty for his capture, was arrested at his lavish estate in Cereté while holding a party under quarantine during the COVID-19 pandemic. Álvarez was described as the "brain" of the cartel and by this point was reported to have taken charge of the cartel's Caribbean operations.

On June 26, 2020, Clan del Golfo and FARC dissidents were confirmed to be in a direct armed conflict in northern Antioquia, known as Operation Mil. Clan del Golfo, which dispatched 1,000 of its paramilitaries from Urabá, southern Córdoba, and Chocó, hoped to suppress FARC rebels in northern Antioquia and take control of the entire municipality of Ituango.

On January 2, 2022, an internal fight occurred between the ELN and FARC dissidents in Arauca, leaving 23 people dead.

On June 9, 2023, the Colombian government and ELN signed a six month nationwide ceasefire, which would go into effect on August 3. This came after months of peace talks in Havana.

On January 19, 2025, ELN and FARC forces erupted into combat in the Catatumbo region. Around 80 people were killed, while thousands of residents fled the violence. Many schools and sports stadiums were converted into refugee shelters, and Colombia deployed 5,000 soldiers in an attempt to restore peace.

Since 13 August, 2025, clashes between FARC dissidents and the Military Forces of Colombia have resulted in at least 34 deaths and a hundred more wounded. In addition, a Black Hawk helicopter leased to the National Police by the U.S. was shot down, reportedly in the Bajo Cauca region, with some reports claiming it occurred in the Amalfi municipality. Later, in 2026, the U.S. Department of State issued a $5,000,000USD Reward for Justice notice for information leading to the capture and arrest of individuals associated with the shootdown of the Black Hawk that occurred August 21, 2025. The notice also implied that Alexander Diaz Mendoza, a leader of a FARC-EP front the EMBF, was implicated in the attack due to his claim of responsibility published by El Espectador. Alexander Diaz was later reported to be killed in an armed clash with the Colombian Army in San Andrés de Cuerquia, on September 13, 2026.

On 25 April, 2026, a bomb exploded on the Pan-American Highway in the municipality of Cajibío, killing 20 people and injuring 36. On April 28, police arrested José Vitonco, an alleged guerrilla leader, with connections to FARC leader Iván Mordisco.

== Effects of the conflict ==
=== Economic Impact ===
==== Physical infrastructure ====
The destruction of physical infrastructure has represented high costs for several sectors of the economy, directly altering production and distribution networks. The costs generated by damage to the oil infrastructure have shown a substantial increase since 1990. This is mainly explained by the increase in attacks on oil pipelines by groups outside the law. According to data from Ecopetrol, between 1999 and 2003, the costs assumed by the hydrocarbon exploitation sector grew by approximately 59%, amounting to $817,654.5 million. This equates to 23.6% of the total royalties that Ecopetrol turned to 20 departments and 110 municipalities, destined to improve the quality of life of the inhabitants. For 2004, costs decreased substantially to $11,015.5 million. This is the first sector most affected by the terrorist actions of groups outside the law. The costs are mainly derived from the spilled oil, "[...] from the repair of the pipeline, from the environmental decontamination and from the oil stopped producing 60% of the total expenses incurred."

During the 1999–2003 period, costs against electrical and telecommunications towers increased substantially, representing $134,871.2 million. This is equivalent to 5.4% of 2003 GDP for the electricity, gas, and water sector. On the other hand, according to data from the National Institute of Roads (INVÍAS), between 1993 and 1995, groups outside the law demolished 11 tolls and a bridge, and its reconstruction cost $378,476,248. This amount increased significantly during the 1999–2003 period, when the costs generated by the reconstruction of the bridges represented $18,455.7 million. These costs are equivalent to 1.71% of the total INVÍAS budget for 2003. For 2004, costs for damage to road infrastructure dropped substantially to $680 million. The partial interruption of the roads directly affects the transport sector, food, and other private guilds, which in turn assume costs for these damages. However, generally these have not been quantified because of the difficulty they pose for being directly calculated. This presents the generalized problem of quantifying the costs associated with conflict. This is explained, in part, by the tendency in the various economic sectors not to denounce these types of actions that, in one way or another, interrupt the normal functioning of economic activities.

==== Kidnapping and extortion ransoms ====
Colombia is a country in which many people are or have been kidnapped. Kidnapping, as one of the manifestations that underlie armed conflict, carries both direct and indirect costs. The former consists mainly of the payment of ransoms and the expenses assumed by the State to control and prevent kidnapping. Indirect costs include, "[...] the loss of human capital for the duration of the detention and for the death of the kidnapped during his captivity".

There are two types of kidnapping:

1. Kidnapping for extortion and political purposes
2. Simple kidnapping

According to data from the Directorate of Justice and Security of the DNP, this phenomenon shows an increasing trend. With respect to the costs of sequestration, the sources suggest an increasing behavior between 1996 and 2003, such that "the average annual growth rate is 9.3%, the highest rate is observed in 1998 (46.2%), and in 2000 (37.2%) year in which the number of kidnappings also it is significantly high [...] reaching its peak in the year 2000 with 1,938 cases." From then on, the trend decreases, except for a peak in 2002 with 1,542 cases, until reaching 350 kidnappings in 2005 (the lowest figure since 1996). Within these costs, 64.4% are direct, representing US$167.4 million. 35.6% of the remaining costs are indirect, and represent US$92.7 million. In 2004, the costs of sequestration were reduced to $109,519 million, representing 0.27% of GDP in 2003.

==== Defense and national security ====
While spending on defense and security becomes very important to examine when dealing with a country immersed in an armed conflict, the analysis on this issue is relatively recent. This can be explained because until the beginning of the second half of the nineties, defense and security spending had significant growth. Spending on defense and security includes, on one hand, the means by which the State must have to defend sovereignty and territorial integrity, and on the other, the costs involved in maintaining internal security.

Various studies of National Planning suggest that the Colombian State spends a much greater percentage in defense and security than other Latin American countries. Between 1991 and 1996, the estimated value of these resources was $3.7 billion. That amounts to 2.6% of Colombia's GDP, while the average of this expentiure in Latin American countries was 1.7% of GDP. A study carried out by the Stockholm International Peace Research Institute (SIPRI) for the year 2001 shows that, "Colombia ranked 24th in the countries with the largest participation in military spending, out of a total of 116 investigated. The figure for the participation of military expenditures in GDP was 3.8% for Colombia, while in the countries of the American continent the closest figure is that of the United States with 3.1%, followed by Chile with 2.9%, Ecuador with 2.1%, and the rest of countries below 2.0% ". Thus, for the period 1999–2003, defense and security spending was $8,463,611.0 million, equivalent to 10.5% of GDP in 2003. The excess of said expense, compared to the average cost of neighboring countries, was close to 0.79% of GDP.

A Fedesarrollo study stated that the spending on defense and security carried out during 2004 "represented 4.5% of GDP", which does not have precedents in the history of Colombia. This is directly related to the Democratic Security Policy (Política de seguridad democrática) undertaken by the government of then-president Álvaro Uribe, who focused on military strikes on groups outside the law in order to regain security national. For the year 2004, the expenses of the Colombian Government in war and security were 6.59%, placing the country between the tenth that invest the most in war as a proportion of GDP.

==== Productivity loss ====
The estimated loss of human capital and productivity due to labor absenteeism in 2003 amounted to $366.2 billion. On the other hand, the loss of land productivity, which translates into a negative impact on administration, investment in physical and social capital, and the price of land in subsectors such as livestock and commercial agriculture is one of the consequences associated with the presence of an armed conflict. This cost is mainly assumed by farmers who experience the pressure of armed actions in their areas of operation. Within this context, the most serious consequences are related to the devaluation of the properties, the loss of productivity of the land (represented in the products that could potentially have been cultivated in these lands), and the difficulty in managing the efficient production of the lands. According to a study of National Planning, between 1999 and 2003 the estimated costs for the loss of productivity of land represented $140,443.5 million, equivalent to 1.28% of the GDP of the agricultural sector of 2003.

==== Income distribution ====
The duration and expansion of the national conflict has had a significant impact on the distribution of income and wealth in Colombia. According to an investigation by the CEDE of the University of the Andes (Universidad de los Andes), "as a result of the displacement, the displaced households have left behind a little more than four million hectares, which correspond to 6.7 times of the total hectares granted by the program of Agrarian Reform during the period between 1993 and 2000, and represent a total value of $ 2.6 billion." In this context, the enormous concentration of rural property in the hands of a few individuals is not only the result of the purchase of land by drug traffickers and the illegal appropriation by groups outside the law, but also the consequence of acquisition of properties devalued due to the armed conflict. It is estimated that 1.3% of the owners control 48% of the best lands.

A study carried out by the United Nations Development Program (UNDP) states that the Colombian conflict has had a negative effect on the income of the population. According to this study, because of the conflict, Colombia has lost 17% of its per capita income in the last ten years. That is to say, "[...] the money wasted every year corresponds to about 4.6 times what the community welfare homes programs, children's homes and school restaurants of the social support network cos."

==== Investments ====
In the long term, the investment of both the State and the private sector is diminished in substantial ways, although the agents adjust their investment behavior, that is, they internalize the phenomenon of violence, assuming it as a change in the structures of the economy. In the case of Colombia, the loss in private investment has been estimated at 0.53 points of the annual GDP, due to the public order conditions that arise directly from the presence of an armed conflict. A 1% increase in the homicide rate reduces private investment by 0.66%. Thus, high levels of violence directly affect the transaction costs and levels of uncertainty in society. Likewise, they reduce to a certain degree the profitability of investments. A study by Corporación Invertir en Colombia (Coinvertir) and the National Planning Department (DNP) shows that insecurity hinders the development of new foreign investments, especially in the financial, oil and gas, and electric power sectors.

One of the biggest hinderences to investing in Colombia is that it is necessary to devote a large part of the budget to security and protection controls, which is difficult to justify before the house. In this sense, the economic environment affected by the violence translates into a tax on investment. On the other hand, within studies on the costs of the conflict, specific sectors such as the private sector have begun to be studied, taking into account the high costs they have had to assume due to the existence of this phenomenon. The large companies and those that operate at the national level assume the highest costs associated with the existence of the conflict. This is because they are more attractive for someone who wants to extort, for example, and also those who lose most in adverse conditions. Appealing to the economic arguments that underlie the conflict, various state and international aid and cooperation institutions seek to establish the scope and potential benefits of a peaceful situation. This argument has mobilized and sensitized various sectors of society to understand that peace is also an economic necessity. In Colombia, as shown in the studies that have estimated the costs of the conflict, since the 1990s, it has imposed increasingly higher costs to various productive sectors of the economy and society in general.

Among the sectors most affected by the conflict are the exploitation of hydrocarbons, electricity, and livestock. This is explained, in part, because the areas where the operations and activities of these sectors take place, in parallel, are the territories where groups outside the law exert a strong presence. Likewise, for the Colombian private sector, indirect costs have more impact on their activities than direct costs. Although there is a clear difficulty in quantifying indirect costs, various studies suggest that they have been significantly high, and that they have had a representative impact on society as such.

=== Illegal drug trafficking ===
Drug trafficking sales have gone up in Colombia since the 1970s due to the conflict. Many Mexican drug cartels have been spotted operating in the area, including the Sinaloa Cartel, Gulf Cartel, Beltrán Leyva Cartel, CJNG, and Los Zetas. The Medellín Cartel and Cali Cartel were the first drug trafficking organizations in Colombia and had alliances with the Guadalajara Cartel, Los Valencia Organization, and Amezcua Cartel.

=== Land mine usage ===
Since 1990, over 11,000 people have been killed or wounded by landmines in Colombia. According to the Presidential Program for Mine Action, between 1982 and the end of 2012, 2,038 people were killed by landmines. Since 2000, casualties from landmines in Colombia have ranged from 1,300 a year to around 550.

In the past, the Colombian government laid landmines around 34 military bases to protect key infrastructure, but it renounced their use in 1997. Landmines are primarily used by rebel groups to protect their home bases and illegal drug crops, which fund the conflict. FARC and ELN have deployed antipersonnel mines throughout an estimated area of up to 100 square kilometers. In March 2015, FARC stated that it would begin humanitarian demining in selected parts of Colombia.

=== Rebel diplomacy ===
The far-left guerrilla group Revolutionary Armed Forces of Colombia (FARC), was one of the most powerful and violent groups the Colombian government had to deal with during the Colombian Conflict. They gained such strength and influence that they started to look for mechanisms to help them grow even stronger; in that sense, they developed a "Rebel Diplomacy", understood as a rebel group's conduct of foreign affairs during the development civil war for the purpose of advancing its military and political objectives. This diplomacy was used as their strategy for engaging with various international actors as they sought any type of support during various stages of the conflict. Among these international actors are the governments of other countries, non-governmental organizations (NGOs), and multinational corporations.

The guerrilla group made intelligent and strategic use of social networks as a means through which to offer the international public who was witnessing the conflict a vision of their own narrative of the conflict, and to present themselves as a credible and preferable alternative to the Colombian government. To that end, FARC designed a web page and obtained support from press agencies and independent digital media, mostly European.

Rebel diplomacy often emerges as a kind of counter-diplomacy aimed at discrediting the State against the insurgent group it is fighting; it is a way of taking the battle to the political arena and waging it at an international scale. This occurred in the case of FARC, which beyond defending its political proposal and ideology, focused its international discourse as a frontal attack on the Government.

=== Continuing dissent ===
FARC dissidents are a group formerly part of the Revolutionary Armed Forces of Colombia, who have refused to lay down their arms after the FARC-government peace treaty came into effect in 2016. The dissidents number some 1,200 armed combatants, with an unknown number of civilian militia supporting them. FARC dissidents have become "an increasing headache" for the Colombian armed forces, as they have to fight them, the EPL, ELN, and Clan del Golfo at the same time. FARC dissidents are led by former mid-level commanders such as alias "Gentil Duarte," alias "Euclides Mora," alias "John 40," alias "Giovanny Chuspas," and alias "Julián Chollo." FARC dissidents have been responsible for several attacks on Colombian armed forces. These fighters are believed to be heavily involved in the production and sale of cocaine. Dissidents of FARC's 1st Front are located in the eastern plains of Colombia. John 40 and their dissident 43rd Front moved into the Amazonas state of western Venezuela. Venezuela has served as the primary location for many FARC dissidents.

On July 15, 2018, the Colombian and Peruvian governments launched a joint military effort, known as Operation Armageddon, to combat FARC dissidents. Peru issued a 60-day state of emergency in the Putumayo Province, an area bordering both Colombia and Ecuador. On the first day alone, more than 50 individuals were arrested in the operation, while four cocaine labs were dismantled. The group has attempted to recruit locals in the Putumayo Province in Peru to take up their cause.

On July 28, 2019, during the XXV São Paulo Forum hosted in Caracas, Nicolás Maduro declared that the FARC-EP dissident leaders Iván Márquez and Jesús Santrich were "welcome" in Venezuela and to the São Paulo Forum.

== Role of the United States ==
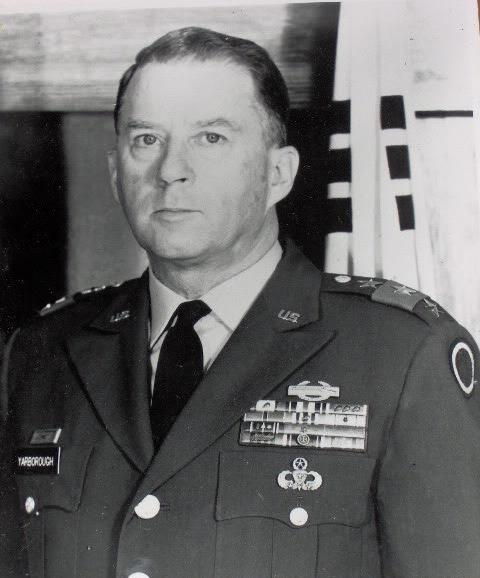
US General William P. Yarborough was the head of a counterinsurgency team sent to Colombia in 1962 by the US Special Warfare Center.

The United States has been heavily involved in the conflict since its beginnings, when in the early 1960s the U.S. government encouraged the Colombian military to attack leftist militias in rural Colombia. This was part of the U.S. fight against communism.

In October 1959, the United States sent a "Special Survey Team", composed of counterinsurgency experts, to investigate Colombia's internal security situation. In February 1962, a Fort Bragg top-level U.S. Special Warfare team headed by Special Warfare Center commander General William P. Yarborough, visited Colombia for a second survey. In a secret supplement to his report to the Joint Chiefs of Staff, Yarborough encouraged the creation and deployment of a paramilitary force to commit sabotage and terrorist acts against communists:

A concerted country team effort should be made now to select civilian and military personnel for clandestine training in resistance operations in case they are needed later. This should be done with a view toward development of a civil and military structure for exploitation in the event the Colombian internal security system deteriorates further. This structure should be used to pressure toward reforms known to be needed, perform counter-agent and counter-propaganda functions and as necessary execute paramilitary, sabotage and/or terrorist activities against known communist proponents. It should be backed by the United States.

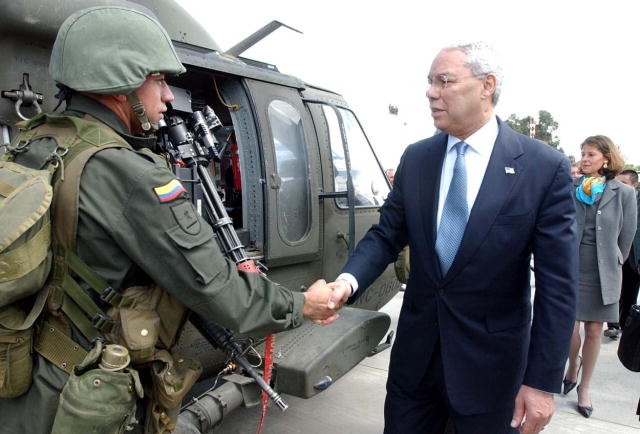
Colin Powell, then-U.S. Secretary of State, visiting Colombia as part of the United States' support of Plan Colombia

The first paramilitary groups were organized following recommendations made by U.S. military counterinsurgency advisers, who were sent to Colombia during the Cold War to combat leftist political activists and armed guerrilla groups.

One multinational corporation has also been directly tied to paramilitary death squads. Chiquita Brands International was fined $25 million as part of a settlement with the United States Justice Department for having ties to paramilitary groups. In 2016, Judge Kenneth Marra of the Southern District of Florida ruled in favor of allowing Colombians to sue former Chiquita Brand International executives for the company's funding of the outlawed right-wing paramilitary organization that murdered their family members. He stated in his decision that "'profits took priority over basic human welfare' in the banana company executives' decision to finance the illegal death squads, despite knowing that this would advance the paramilitaries' murderous campaign."

In December 2013, The Washington Post revealed a covert CIA program, started in the early 2000s, which provided the Colombian government with intelligence and GPS guidance systems for smart bombs.

As of August 2004, the US had spent $3 billion in Colombia, more than 75% of it on military aid. Before the Iraq War, Colombia was the third largest recipient of US aid, only after Egypt and Israel, and the U.S. has 400 military personnel and 400 civilian contractors in Colombia. Currently, however, Colombia is not a top recipient of U.S. aid, though it was under the first five years of the Plan Colombia.

In March 2015, it was revealed DEA agents were participating in drug cartel-funded sex parties with prostitutes. Agents were provided with expensive gifts, weapons, and money from drug cartel members. As a result, the head of the US Drug Enforcement Administration, Michele Leonhart, announced her retirement.

According to the 2022 Truth Commission report, the 2019 arrest of Jesús Santrich on drug trafficking charges, which was a joint operation by the DEA and Colombian Attorney General Néstor Humberto Martínez, was intended to send a message from the Colombian Attorney General's to the Colombian public that the peace process had failed. Santrich's arrest led to hundreds of ex-guerrillas taking up arms again, which jeopardized the peace process.

== Victims of the conflict ==
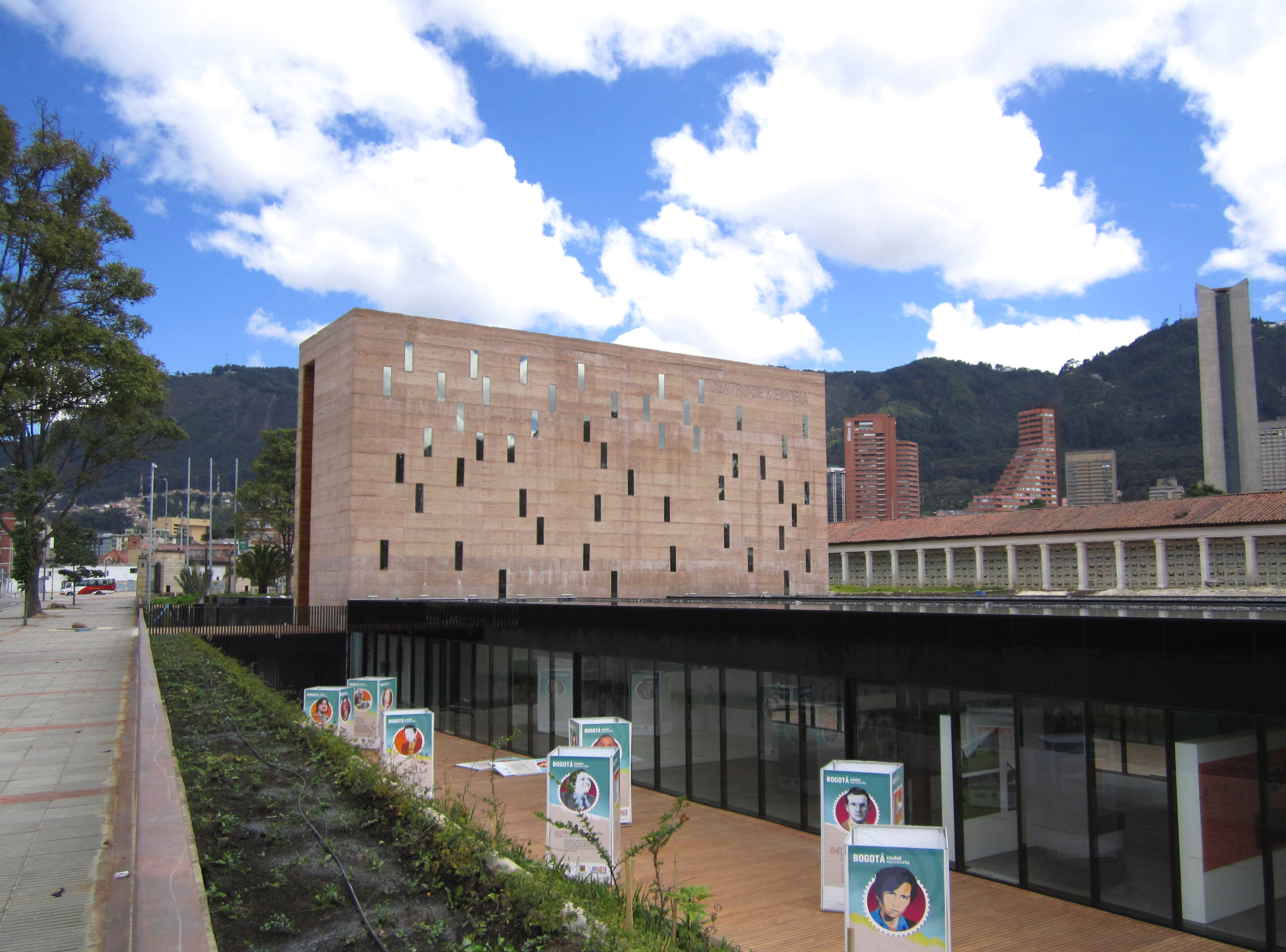
The Memorial for Life and Center for Peace, Memory, and Reconciliation, located in Peace and Memory Park. In Colombia, April 9 is a symbolic day. It is a day of remembrance and solidarity with the conflict's victims.

According to a study by Colombia's National Centre for Historical Memory, 220,000 people have died in the conflict between 1958 and 2013, most of them civilians (177,307 civilians, 40,787 fighters) and more than five million civilians were forced from their homes between 1985 and 2012, generating the world's second largest population of internally displaced persons (IDPs). The report shows that the humanitarian crisis in Colombia is extremely serious in terms of both lethal and nonlethal violence: it examines the widespread use of sexual violence against women and girls as a weapon of war, as well as the invisibility of this phenomenon. 16.9% of the population in Colombia has been a direct victim of the war.

2.3 million children have been displaced from their homes, and 45,000 children have been killed, according to national figures cited by Unicef. In total, one in three of the 7.6 million registered victims of the conflict are children, and since 1985, 8,000 minors have disappeared. As of 2016, some 1,000 children have been forcibly recruited by some of the myriad armed groups in the country, 75 have been killed, and 65 schools have been damaged by fighting since peace talks with FARC began.

According to the report "Basta ya", written in 2013 by Colombia's National Centre for Historical Memory, 80% of victims affected by conflict-related violence and landmines were civilians. The report documents 1,982 massacres between 1980 and 2012.

The Government also began a process of assistance, attention, and comprehensive reparation for victims of conflict. During his visit to Colombia, Pope Francis brought with him a message of peace and paid tribute to the victims of the conflict.

The Special Jurisdiction of Peace (Jurisdicción Especial para la Paz, JEP) is the transitional justice component of the Comprehensive System, complying with Colombia's duty to investigate, clarify, prosecute, and punish serious human rights violations and grave breaches of international humanitarian law which occurred during the armed conflict. Its objectives are to satisfy victims' right to justice, offer truth to the public, contribute to the reparation of victims, contribute to the fight against impunity, and adopt decisions which give full legal security to direct and indirect participants in the conflict and contribute to the achievement of a stable and lasting peace.

The Special Unit for the Search of Missing Persons in the context and due to the armed conflict (Unidad especial para la búsqueda de personas dadas por desaparecidas en el contexto y en razón del conflicto armado) would be a special high-level unit created following the signature of the final agreement. It would direct and coordinate efforts to search for and locate missing persons, or find their remains so that they may be returned to their families. To carry out its work, the search unit would collect the necessary information about missing persons, analyze the information collected, strengthen and streamline processes for identifying mortal remains in coordination with the National Institute of Legal Medicine and Forensic Sciences, guarantee families' participation, and present an official report to families informing them of the fate of missing relatives. The search unit would be administrative and financially independent and autonomous, complementing the other components of the Comprehensive System.
