= 2022 Huila attack =

Ambush in Colombia

- Part of Colombian conflict
- Location: San Luis, Huila Department
- Date: 2 September 2022
- Target: Police
- Weapon: Bomb
- Deaths: 7
- Injuries: 1
- Perpetrator: FARC dissidents

On 2 September 2022, a police vehicle hit a bomb near the town of Corozal, killing seven police officers and injuring another.

== Bombing ==
On 2 September 2022, a police vehicle carrying eight police officers was traveling to a social welfare event in the town of San Luis, while traveling through the small town of Corozal, the vehicle hit a bomb. The vehicle was destroyed and flipped over on its top. The Explosion killed seven of the police officers instantly and severely injured another one.

Colombian president Gustavo Petro said in a tweet that the bombing was an attempt to “sabotage” the peace process. A FARC dissident group under command of Iván Mordisco claimed responsibility for the attack, stating it was revenge for the killing of four of its members in a recent clash with police.
