= Ernesto Rojas =

Ernesto Rojas may refer to:

- Ernesto Rojas del Campo (1893–1950), Chilean politician
- Ernesto Rojas (footballer), played in the 2018 Copa Chile
- Ernesto Rojas (guerrilla) (1949–1987), Colombian guerrilla, leader of the Popular Liberation Army (EPL)
- Ernesto Rojas Commandos (1991–1992), Colombian guerrilla group
