= Total Peace =

2022–25 Colombian public safety policy

Total Peace was a peace policy designed and implemented by the Colombian government of Gustavo Petro. This law modifies the Public Law order and allows for the government to negotiate with armed and criminal groups using different strategies and legal tools.

Organized Armed Groups - groups that under the leadership of a responsible command, exercise enough control over part of a territory to carry out sustained and coordinated military operations- are entitled to enter a formal peace dialogue or political negotiation with the aim of signing a Peace Agreement. Criminal groups, or high-impact criminal structures, meaning those violent groups involved in illicit economies and that exercise criminal violence over a population- can enter a 'socio-juridical conversation' to agree their surrender/submission to justice process. This means that the scope of the aspects to be discussed during the process is more limited than those discussed with Organized Armed Groups.

According to the Total Peace law, groups integrated by members of the former FARC cannot be considered Organised Armed groups, yet political negotiations have been established with FARC dissident groups.

The High-Level Instance created by the law, coordinated by the Minister of Defence and integrated by the Director of National Intelligence and Colombia's High Commissioner for Peace, was supposed to categorise illegal groups into criminal organisations or Organised Armed groups and thus determine the route for engagement but such Instance has failed to meet and categorisations have been de facto made by the High Commissioner for Peace, including political negotiations with factions of the FARC dissident groups.

== Implementation ==
By mid-2024, seven parallel processes are taking place with different armed and criminal groups, all with different levels of progress.

- A political dialogue with the Ejército de Liberación Nacional guerrilla achieved for the first time in history a one-year long ceasefire. But after over 6 months of stalled negotiations, the ELN carried a violent attack in Arauca that resulted in at least three dead soldiers and over 25 wounded. As a result, Gustavo Petro's government suspended the negotiation process.

- A regional negotiation with a splintered faction of the ELN known as Comuneros del Sur was formally opened in Nariño. While no ceasefire has been agreed, different deescalation measures have been taking place. The official recognition of this former faction as an independent group was the main reason that caused the ELN table to be stalled that eventually led to the suspension.

- A political dialogue with the Estado Mayor Central (EMC), one of the FARC dissident groups was taking place and resulted in an agreed ceasefire. However, the ceasefire was partially lifted by the government and the group split into two faction, one of which (Calarca's faction) remains in an active political dialogue with the government, while there is an ongoing confrontation with Iván Mordisco's faction. A political dialogue is also taking place with Second Marquetalia, another faction of the FARC dissident groups.

- Three urban processes via the 'socio-legal dialogues' with very diverse criminal groups and gangs are taking place in Medellín, Buenaventura and Quibdó. In Buenaventura and Medellín a truce between groups with has been achieved, while the one in Quibdó was lifted after the Clan del Golfo or Autodefensas Gaitanistas de Colombia have increased their influence over the city. The legal path moving forward is still unclear as the surrendering to justice bill needs to be approved by congress.

Other potential processes with Clan del Golfo and the "Autodefensas Conquitadoras de la Sierra Nevada" remain in the exploratory phase.

== Approval ==
The project was evaluated in advance by members of the two chambers, the Senate and the House of Representatives, where it was subsequently approved as Law 181 or the Total Peace Law, with 62 votes in favor and 13 against in the Senate and 128 votes in favor and seven against in the House of Representatives.

== Support and opposition ==
=== Domestic ===
By June 2025, only 19% of Colombians believed that the policy was going well, with over 70% believing it was "off-track."

=== International ===
The international community has welcomed Petro's efforts to peacebuilding and the United Nations will support the implementation with resources provided by the Multidonor Fund.

Mireia Villar Forner, resident coordinator of the United Nations system in Colombia and co-president of the Fund, assured the press that, in an innovative way, the Fund intends to support broader actions to build peace in Colombia beyond the implementation of the peace agreement signed in 2016 between the State and the guerrilla of the Revolutionary Armed Forces of Colombia (FARC).

The Multidonor Fund received new contributions for 2023 that add up to 17.4 million dollars from Norway, Germany, Ireland and the United Kingdom and that complement others already made by countries such as Switzerland, Canada and Spain. Thus, the action plan approved for next year will have an investment of 55 million dollars, the highest since the fund was created in 2016 to support the peace process with the FARC. However, the amount that will be invested in the "total peace" policy of the current government was not detailed.
