= Fuerzas Armadas Revolucionarias =

Fuerzas Amardas Revolucionarias is Spanish for Revolutionary Armed Forces and can refer to:

- Revolutionary Armed Forces of Colombia, a guerrilla group active in Colombia from 1964 to 2017
- Indigenous Revolutionary Armed Forces of the Pacific, a revolutionary group in Colombia
- Cuban Revolutionary Armed Forces, the army of Cuba
