= La Victoria, Apure =

La Victoria
- Location within Apure Location within Venezuela
- Coordinates: 7°1′56″N 71°26′11″W
- Country: Venezuela
- State: Apure
- Municipality: Páez
- Demonym: Victoriano/a
- Time zone: UTC−4 (VET)
- Climate: Aw

La Victoria (Spanish pronunciation: [la βiɣˈtoɾja]) is a locality in the state of Apure in Venezuela, on the Venezuelan side of the banks of the Arauca River.

In 2021, it was the epicenter of clashes between FARC dissidents and the Venezuelan Armed Forces that caused a forced migration of more than 4 thousand inhabitants to the Colombian town of Arauquita.
