= Apure clashes (2021–2022) =

Clashes on the Venezuela–Colombia border

2021 Apure clashes
- Part of the Venezuelan crisis and the spillover of the Colombian conflict
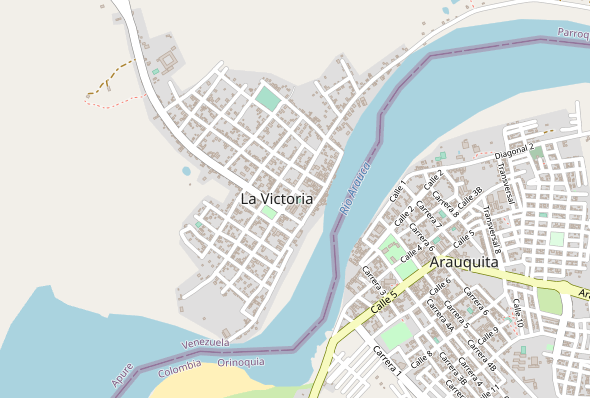
- Location of La Victoria, area of the clashes, next to the Arauca River. To the right, Arauquita, Colombia.
Date	21 March 2021 – January 2022
Location	La Victoria, Apure state, Venezuela

Belligerents
FARC dissidents Sinaloa Cartel	Venezuela; ELN

Casualties and losses
32 arrests 10 killed (1 guerilla leader)	14–16 soldiers killed 14 wounded 8 captured soldiers One damaged BTR-80
- 6,000 displaced Venezuelans

The 2021 Apure clashes started on 21 March 2021 in the south of the Páez Municipality, in the Apure state in Venezuela, specifically in La Victoria, a location bordering with Colombia, between guerrilla groups identified as Revolutionary Armed Forces of Colombia (FARC-EP) dissidents and the Venezuelan government led by Nicolás Maduro.

The conflict has provoked the displacement of at least 6,000 Venezuelans in Colombian territory, the destruction of the custom house in La Victoria, bombardments by the Venezuelan aviation, two casualties and several wounded of the Venezuelan Armed Forces. Colombian guerrilla leaders Iván Márquez and Jesús Santrich have been dismissed from responsibility of the attack by media outlets, who have attributed it to internal rebels of the armed group. Some civilians have accused security forces of committing abuses, including detaining and killing civilians, as well as both looting and burning homes. Mechanic José Castillo told Reuters that people were dressed in Venezuelan army uniforms in order to pass them off as guerrillas.

Venezuelan non-governmental organizations, such as Fundaredes and Provea, have denounced human right violations committed by Venezuelan security forces against Venezuelan civilians, warning that the death of five family relatives in El Ripial could constitute extrajudicial killings and drawing similarities with the Massacre of El Amparo in 1988, where Venezuelan military and police officers killed fourteen fishermen and presented them as guerrillas.

== Background ==
On 23 June 2016, the Colombian government and the Revolutionary Armed Forces of Colombia (FARC) rebels signed a historic ceasefire deal, bringing them closer to ending more than five decades of conflict. Although the deal was rejected in the subsequent October plebiscite, the same month, President of Colombia Juan Manuel Santos was awarded the Nobel Peace Prize for his efforts to bring the country's more than 50-year-long civil war to an end. A revised peace deal was signed the following month and submitted to Congress for approval. The House of Representatives unanimously approved the plan on 30 November, a day after the Senate also gave its backing.

Dissidents formerly part of the FARC have refused to lay down their arms after the FARC-government peace treaty came into effect in 2016. The dissidents number some 1200 armed combatants with an unknown number of civilian militia supporting them. These fighters are believed to be heavily involved in the production and sale of cocaine. Dissidents of FARC's 1st Front are located in the eastern plains of Colombia. Jhon 40 and their dissident 43rd Front moved into the Amazonas state of western Venezuela. Venezuela has served as the primary location for many FARC dissidents. On 15 July 2018, the Colombian and Peruvian governments launched a joint military effort known as Operation Armageddon to combat FARC dissidents. Peru issued a 60-day state of emergency in the Putumayo Province, an area bordering both Colombia and Ecuador. On the first day alone, more than 50 individuals were arrested in the operation, while four cocaine labs were dismantled. The group has attempted to recruit locals in the Putumayo Province in Peru to take up their cause.

On 28 July 2019, during the XXV São Paulo Forum hosted in Caracas, Nicolás Maduro declared that the FARC-EP dissidents leaders Iván Márquez and Jesús Santrich were "welcome" in Venezuela and to the São Paulo Forum.

Experts have argued that the motive for the clashes is the control of drug trafficking routes.

The Special Actions Forces (FAES), a task force of the Venezuelan National Police, has increased its presence in the area. Experts have affirmed that the FAES has gathered intelligence about the population and that they have not fought against guerrillas forces. Journalist Rocío San Miguel, specialized in military topics, has declared that the presence of the FAES in the area could be attributed to distrust of the executive branch in the Armed Forces.

== Timeline of events ==
=== 2021 ===
==== March ====
On 21 March 2021, an irregular armed group identified as FARC-EP dissidents started an attack to the Venezuelan army battalion in La Victoria town, located in the Colombian-Venezuelan border.

As soon as the clashes started a strong military presence was reported in the Apure state; the Guasdualito Airport was taken and militarized. The same day, K-8 combat planes of the Venezuelan Air Force bombarded the lower part of La Victoria; the bombardments were directed at guerilla camp sites. Javier Tarazona, director of the NGO Fundaredes, argued that the bombings were local and did not have the purpose of targeting the Colombian guerrillas that operated inside Venezuela.

The following day, on 22 March, the Venezuelan Defense Minister, Vladimir Padrino López, declared that two Venezuelan soldiers were killed and that 32 guerrillas had been arrested. He also assured having "neutralized" the leader of the attacks, alias "Nando", considering the situation as controlled. Shootouts and artillery mobilization continued in the following days.

On the night of 23 March, the local custom house was destroyed by guerrillas using explosives. After the custom house attack, La Victoria was left without electric power and communications in the area were cut off, so most of the information was shared in social media. Human Rights Watch reported that over 3,000 Venezuelans civilians had been displaced to Arauquita, Colombia, where centers were established to help the refugees. On 24 March, through the human rights organization Provea, inhabitants of La Victoria denounced abuses, human rights violations and theft by Venezuelan officers.

Armed conflicts continued on 25 March, as more clashes between guerrillas and the Armed Forces were reported. Venezuelan soldiers used self-propelled artillery in combat, including three armoured vehicles. Around the midday, a landmine exploded while the armoured vehicles moved through El Ripial sector. The Venezuelan government condemned the used of "terrorist methods" by the guerrilla and declared that it would request the help of the United Nations to disable the anti-personnel mines. NGOs reported that the activation of the mines had killed two Venezuelan soldiers. There were reports of arbitrary detentions during the shootouts and of Venezuelan military officers asking for money for releases. The NGO Fundaredes denounced that on 26 March several attacks against the civilian population took place.

Another guerilla attack and nine wounded soldiers were reported on 29 March. Argentine news website Infobae also compared the conflict to the 1995 Cararabo massacre.

Vladimir Padrino López announced the beginning of radio transmissions by the Armed Forces in the Tiuna FM Radial Circuit, in La Victoria, on 31 March, to combat misinformation. The same day, two Venezuelan soldiers were killed after a mixed patrol commission that carried out patrol, reconnaissance and search operations in El Ripial was attacked with a rocket launcher.

==== April ====
On 1 April, two more Venezuelan soldiers were killed after an anti-personnel mine exploded. Two human rights activists and two journalists that moved to the area to report on the conflict were arrested by security forces. Juan Guaidó condemned the detention. They were released the following day. The Armed Forces sent a surgical mobile hospital to Apure to attend to wounded soldiers.

A house and a school in Los Cañitos were bombarded by the Venezuelan Armed Forces on 2 April. Two soldiers died while handling a Russian SANI 120 MM mortar due to a grenade detonation accident on 3 April. On 4 April Nicolás Maduro declared that the armed group dresses up as guerrillas "to serve the drug trafficking routes", without identifying the group.

On 29 April 2021, eight Venezuelan soldiers were killed in clashes with "irregular Colombian armed groups", according to the Ministry of Defence.

==== May ====
On 15 May 2021, the Venezuelan Army recognized that 8 of its soldiers had been captured in jungle fighting on May 9. On Tuesday, 18 May, Jesús Santrich was killed in the Venezuelan territory.

==== December ====
On 5 December 2021, the leader of the Venezuelan armed organization Segunda Marketalia, Hernán Darío Velázquez, nicknamed "El Paisa", was killed in Venezuela. El Paisa was killed during a shootout near the Colombian border of Arauca and Vichada, there is no information about other dead or injured.

According to media reports, the attack could have been carried out by members of the Tenth Front of the FARC (Revolutionary Armed Forces of Colombia), waging a territorial war with the Segunda Marketalia in Colombia and Venezuela, connected with drug trafficking. At the same time, sources of the publication ruled out any relation of the Colombian government to the shootout.

=== 2022 ===
==== January ====
On January 1 Santiago Urrutia (pseudonym) pre ELN members came looking for his 26-year-old brother, Javier (pseudonym) at his house in rural Tame, accusing Javier of collaborating with the Joint Eastern Command. They threw Javier, a peasant, to the ground, tied his hands behind his back, and loaded him onto a motorbike

On the 19th a car bomb exploded near a building in an area with several human right groups which the Joint eastern command claimed responsibility saying it was targeting an ELN urban headquarters.

On January 20, ELN members broke into a house in rural Puerto Páez, Apure, and took away a 14-year-old girl and her 18-year-old brother at gunpoint, a relative said.

On January 28, a neighbor told their mother that her children had been killed during a fight with a FARC dissident group and where to find their bodies. The mother found them and said there were many other corpses in the area.

== Reactions ==
=== National ===
- The opposition National Assembly has denounced in the United Nations over thirty human rights violations during the clashes.
- Juan Guaidó declared in Twitter: "Maduro has turned our territory a haven of irregular armed groups that act with the accomplice watch of the Armed Forces", blaming the Venezuelan government for the displacement of Venezuelans.
- Iván Simonovis, retired intelligence officer and Guaidó's security commissioner, condemned the violence.
- Venezuelan non-governmental organizations, such as Fundaredes and Provea, have denounced human right violations committed by Venezuelan security forces against Venezuelan civilians, warning that the death of five family relatives in El Ripial could constitute extrajudicial killings and drawing similarities with the Massacre of El Amparo in 1988, where Venezuelan military and police officers killed fourteen fishermen and presented them as guerrillas. Twenty-five NGOs defined the situation as a "massacre" and asked for a both national and international investigation.
- The associations Control Ciudadano and Puentes Ciudadanos Colombia Venezuela, along with 300 Colombian and Venezuelan citizens and 60 NGOs from both countries asked the United Nations to appoint a special envoy for the border crisis.
- Campesinos published a video asking for peace and not to be treated as guerrillas, saying they were afraid or unable to return home.

=== International ===
- United Nations Office for the Coordination of Humanitarian Affairs (OCHA) announced that the suspension of humanitarian activities due to the conflict.
- Human Rights Watch (HRW) expressed its concern for Venezuelans that had been displaced to Colombia and condemned human rights violations committed in Apure by state security forces. HRW later reported that the human rights violations committed were more evidence for the International Criminal Court.
- Colombian President Iván Duque declared that the Apure conflict was between the Venezuelan Cartel of the Suns and the FARC dissidents, while saying that a protocol was started to receive refugees and prevent a COVID-19 outbreak in Arauquita. The Office of the Inspector General of Colombia declared that the situation needs international assistance, insisting the humanitarian guarantees must be granted for the Venezuelans displaced because of the conflict.

== See also ==
- 2022 Arauca clashes
- 2018 Amazonas ambush
- Massacre of El Amparo
- "False positives" scandal
