= Marxist–Leninist–Maoist Tendency =

Marxist–Leninist–Maoist Tendency (Spanish: Tendencia Marxista Leninista- Maoista, abbreviated 'Tendencia ML') was a communist group in Colombia. It emerged in late 1974/early 1975, after the 4th plenary session of the Central Committee of the Communist Party of Colombia (Marxist-Leninist) (PCC(ML)). The founders of Tendencia ML, had been based in the Pedro Vásquez Rendón regional committee of PCC(ML) in Antioquia. They opposed the directive of the PCC(ML) party leadership that cadres in the urban labour, student and teachers movements had to shift to the countryside to join the Popular Liberation Army. The Tendencia ML criticized PCC(ML) for giving insufficient importance to trade unionism, electoral work and other mass struggles.

Regional committees of Tendencia included:

- Antioquia: Pedro Vásquez Rendón
- Western Colombia: Ricardo Torres
- Bogotá/Cundinamarca: Enver Hoxha
- Atlantic Coast: Bernardo Ferreira Grandet

Tendencia ML was riven by internal divisions. By the late 1970s, two separate groups had emerged, the 'Majority' and the 'Minority'. The 'Majority' would later form the Workers Revolutionary Party (PRT) whereas the 'Minority' joined forces with the Revolutionary Unification Movement - Marxist-Leninist, merging into it by 1982.
