= ¡A Luchar! =

Political movement in Colombia

¡A Luchar! was a political movement in Colombia, formed as a coalition of various progressive trade unionist and social movements.

== Background ==
With the launching of the policy of national dialogue by the Belisario Betancur government in 1984, various underground left-wing groups began exploring the possibility of building up legal movements. With the social struggles in North-Eastern Colombia, the petrol workers' struggle in Arauca, and the leadership of the Spanish priest Manuel Pérez inside the movement, the National Liberation Army (ELN) began to orient itself towards non-military social struggles.

¡A Luchar! emerged from a long process of discussions and cooperation between three groups within the Colombian leftwing: ELN, Workers Revolutionary Party (PRT), and the Revolutionary Integration Movement - Free Fatherland (MIR-Patria Libre). The three parties had begun cooperating in 1984. 18 months later, ¡A Luchar! was founded at a Workers, Peasants, People's Meeting, held as a commemoration of José Antonio Galán on March 16–March 17, 1985. In its initial organization phase, ¡A Luchar! mobilized a national civic strike on June 20 against the policies of the Betancur government regarding economic liberalizations and peace negotiations. However, the build-up of ¡A Luchar! aggravated internal divisions between the 'military' and 'political' tendencies inside ELN.

== 1986 congress ==
From June 28–June 30, 1986, the movement held its first congress in the Jorge Elicier Gaitan Theatre in Bogotá; the organizations that took part in the congress were:

- Colectivos de Trabajo Sindical (politically linked to ELN)
- Corriente de Integración Sindical (politically linked to PRT)
- Movimiento Pan y Libertad (politically linked to MIR-PL)
- Socialist Workers Party (Colombia)
- Revolutionary Workers Commandos
- FER-Sin Permiso (students front of ELN)
- Comité de Activistas Creditarios
- Opinión Obrera and other groupings.

In total 850 delegates took part, as well as some 1000-1500 observers.

== Political activity ==
Nelson Berrío was the main leader of ¡A Luchar!.

¡A Luchar! called for a 'popular tribunal' for President Betancur. His successor, Virgilio Barco, was characterized by the movement as serving the interests of the United States and big capital.

== Repression ==
Similar to the Patriotic Union, ¡A Luchar! became a target for paramilitary violence. Many of its cadres were murdered.
