= 2022 Arauca clashes =

Infight between far-left guerrillas in Colombia

- Location: Arauca Department, Colombia
- Date: 2 January 2022
- Attack type: clashes
- Deaths: 23
- Injuries: unknown

2022 Arauca clashes
- Part of the Colombian conflict and the Venezuelan crisis
Date	2 January 2022
Location	Arauca Department, Colombia

Belligerents
ELN	FARC dissidents

On 2 January 2022, 23 people were killed in clashes between far-left guerrilla groups in Arauca Department, Colombia. The National Liberation Army (ELN) clashed with Revolutionary Armed Forces of Colombia (FARC) dissidents near the border with Venezuela.

FARC agreed to a ceasefire in 2016, but there are around 5,000 dissidents currently operating. There are about 2,500 active ELN members. Colombia is the world's largest producer of cocaine; the two militant groups clash due to fighting over control of the large illegal drug trade.

== See also ==
- 2021 Apure clashes
