= 2026 Cauca bombing =

Civilian bombing in Colombia

- Part of the Colombian conflict
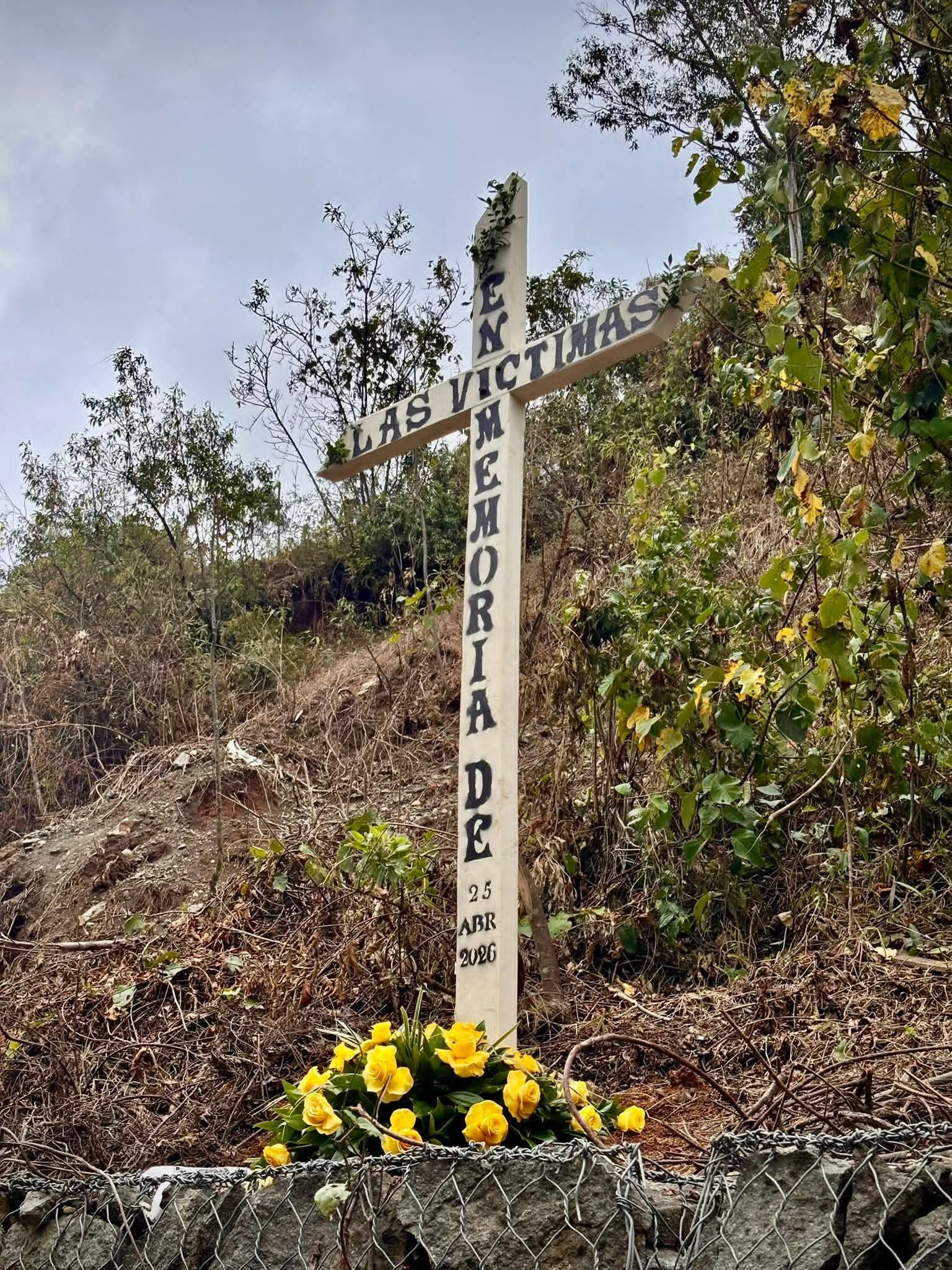
- Location: Pan-American Highway near Cajibío, Cauca Department, Colombia
- Date: 25 April 2026
- Target: Civilians
- Attack type: Bombing
- Deaths: 20
- Injuries: 36
- Perpetrator: FARC dissidents (according to Colombian government)

On 25 April 2026, a bomb exploded along the Pan-American Highway in the municipality of Cajibío, department of Cauca, Colombia, setting fire to a bus and damaging several vehicles, which resulted in the killing of 20 civilians and the wounding of 36 more.

== History ==
Authorities accused the main dissident group of the FARC guerrillas, and Defence Minister Pedro Arnulfo Sánchez offered a 5 billon peso (US$1.4m, €1.2m) reward for the suspect Iván Jacob Idrobo Arredondo, aka "Marlon".

The previous day, an attack on a military base in Cali, the country's third-largest city, left one person dead and marked the beginning of a series of attacks in the Cauca region, a stronghold of FARC dissidents.
