= Workers Revolutionary Party of Colombia =

- Abbreviation: PRT
- Founded: 1982
- Dissolved: 1991
- Split from: Tendencia ML
- Labour wing: CIS
- Ideology: Communism; Marxism-Leninism-Maoism
- Political position: Far-left
- National affiliation: CGSB

Party flag

Workers Revolutionary Party of Colombia (Spanish: Partido Revolucionario de los Trabajadores de Colombia) was a political party in Colombia. The party was founded in 1982. It emerged from the 'Majority' faction of the Marxist-Leninist-Maoist Tendency, a group that had broken away from the Communist Party of Colombia (Marxist-Leninist) in the mid-1970s.

PRT launched armed struggle against government forces. According to official sources, when the PRT militias were demobilized in 1991 the party had around 200 fighters.

Apart from its armed struggle PRT maintained an open mass front, the trade union organization Corriente de Integración Sindical.

== Coordination work ==
In 1984 PRT entered into the 'Trilateral', a cooperation between the National Liberation Army (ELN), the Revolutionary Integration Movement - Free Fatherland (MIR-PL) and PRT. Amongst other things, the Trilateral resulted in coordination of mass movement activities, leading up the formation of ¡A Luchar! as a joint mass movement. On June 20, 1985, PRT took part in, along with ¡A Luchar!, organizing a national general strike against the policies of the Belisario Betancur government. At the time the National Guerrilla Coordination was born, a coalition consisting of ELN, Popular Liberation Army (EPL), M-19, MIR-PL, Armed Movement Quintín Lame (MAQL), Commando Ricardo Franco (RF) and PRT. With the entry of FARC-EP into the unity work of Colombian guerrilla movements, the National Guerrilla Coordination evolved into the Coordinadora Guerrillera Simón Bolívar in September 1987. Founding members of CGSB were EPL, UC-ELN, FARC-EP, MAQL, M-19 and PRT.

== Peace Treaty ==
In December 1990, president Virgilio Barco expressed willingness to hold peace talks with PRT. Talks were initiated between the Colombian government and PRT. On December 28 an accord was signed between the government and PRT. On January 25, 1991, a final peace treaty was signed in Don Gabriel, Ovejas municipality, Sucre, between the government and PRT. It stipulated, amongst other things, that:

- PRT would become a legal political party
- PRT would gain representation in the Constituent Assembly. The party was given one seat in the assembly, but without vote.
- A TV programme of the party would be broadcast
- PRT would get a full page ad in 2 national newspapers and 4 regional newspapers, as well half-page ads in 1 national newspaper and 3 regional newspapers.
- Government would pay for an office for PRT in Bogotá
- An armoured car for the PRT spokesperson in the Constituent Assembly, four bodyguards and 14 bulletproof vests for the PRT leadership.
- Government would finance the building of five Casas por la Vida, in Bogotá, Barranquilla, Medellín, Sincelejo and one additional location.
- A fund of 300 million pesos would be allocated for projects in the conflict areas of PRT. A joint government-PRT commission would oversee the distribution of the funds.
- Subsidy for upkeep, health and education would be given to demobilized PRT fighters, through a fund.
- An Indigenous Police force would be formed within the Colombian National Police.

On behalf of the PRT the peace treaty was signed by Valentín González, Sergio Sierra, Pablo Roncallo, Rafael González and Ernesto Falla.

The weaponry of PRT was destroyed at a ceremony on January 26.

== Aftermath ==
Even though the peace treaty specified that PRT would reorganize themselves as a legal political party, such a move never occurred. Instead some members of PRT joined M-19. Rather than organizing party work, PRT cadres became active in social organizations, primarily focus on human rights and peace promotion, in Bolívar and Sucre.
