= Megateo =

Colombian guerrilla, narcotics dealer, and criminal

Víctor Ramón Navarro Serrano
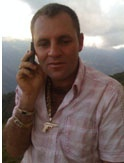
- Megato in 2012
- Born: January 25, 1976; San Calixto, Norte de Santander, Colombia
- Died: October 2, 2015 (aged 39); Hacarí, Colombia
- Other names: Megato
- Organization: Popular Liberation Army

Víctor Ramón Navarro Serrano, under the alias of Megateo, (25 January 1976 – 2 October 2015) was a Colombian guerrilla and drug lord. He belonged to the Popular Liberation Army rebel group.

== Life ==
Megateo was born in the urban area of the municipality of San Calixto, Norte de Santander. His childhood was spent in a normal way, but since his youth he wanted to join the ranks of the insurgent organization of the Popular Liberation Army.

The first offense in which his name appears in data was in November 14, 2001, when he ordered the kidnapping of the band of singer Alfredo Gutiérrez. On August 14, 2005, he ordered and directed the attack on a police patrolman on the Pávez Abrego path that left four dead soldiers as a result. On April 25, 2006, 10 DAS detectives, 6 soldiers and an informant who went in their search are killed in a firefight. The incident took place in rural Hacarí, at a point between Mesarrica and the shipyards. For this crime, Megateo handed two butts of cocaine, a gold watch and $2 million to the DAS detective Carlos Alberto Suarez Reyes, who leaked the information of the operation against the guerrilla.

On July 25, 2008, two men belonging to the inner circle of security managed to drug him with one of his bodyguards. DAS intended to give it in exchange for the reward offered by the Colombian authorities captured. Delivering Megateo and his escort outside Ocaña, where two detectives of the institution set up in the bed of a truck in order to bring them to Cúcuta. However, in what is still considered a mystery, Megateo disappeared somewhere along the road leading to Cúcuta from Ocaña. The detectives in charge of his custody at the time said that in trying to recapture him, their weapons were jammed and they had not been able to stop him when Megateo went into the bush.

Even after reports of his supposed death in August, he actually died on 2 October 2015 in Hacarí.
