= Corriente de Integración Sindical =

Colombian trade unionist group

Corriente de Integración Sindical (CIS) was a trade unionist group in Colombia, which functioned as the labour wing of the Workers Revolutionary Party.

In 1984 CIS entered into a cooperation with the legal structures of the National Liberation Army (ELN) and the Revolutionary Integration Movement - Free Fatherland (MIR-Patria Libre). In June 1986 CIS was one of the organizations that founded ¡A Luchar!, together with the legal fronts of ELN and MIR-PL.
