= Indigenous Revolutionary Armed Forces of the Pacific =

- Dates active: 1987 – 1996
- Headquarters: Chocó
- Active regions: Colombia
- Ideology: Indigenous rights
- Size: Up to 1,000 at its height
- Wars: Colombian armed conflict

The Indigenous Revolutionary Armed Forces of the Pacific (Spanish: Fuerzas Armadas Revolucionarias Indígenas del Pacífico) was a small guerrilla group based in rural Indigenous areas of the Pacific region of Colombia.

The group, known by the acronym of FARIP, was an Indigenous revolutionary group active in the Colombian department of Chocó and neighboring regions. It was founded in 1987 as an Indigenous offshoot of the 34th Front of Northwestern Bloc of the Revolutionary Armed Forces of Colombia (FARC), historically Colombia's oldest and largest left-wing guerrilla organization.

The FARIP is estimated to have contained up to 1,000 members at its height and carried out acts of sabotage, assassination, extortion, and military attacks on government and civilian targets within its zone of operation, sometimes in coordination with the FARC. The FARIP was dissolved in 1996, due in part to the efforts of Indigenous civil society organizations such the National Indigenous Organization of Colombia (ONIC).
