= Ernesto Rojas Commandos =

The Ernesto Rojas Commandos (Spanish: Comandos Ernesto Rojas, named for Ernesto Rojas) was a small guerrilla group in Colombia. It was formed through a split in the EPL in 1991. It demobilized through a peace treaty with the government in 1992. At the time of demobilization CER had 25 fighters.
