= Simón Bolívar Guerrilla Coordinating Board =

- Flag of the Simón Bolívar Guerrilla Coordinating Board
- Active: 1987 – early 1990s
- Country: Colombia
- Allegiance: Leftism, major components were communist
- Role: Guerrilla warfare
- Part of: FARC–EP; M-19; ELN; EPL; PRT; MAQL
- Colors: Red
- Equipment: Small arms

The Simón Bolívar Guerrilla Coordinating Board (Spanish: Coordinadora Guerrillera Simón Bolívar or CGSB) was an umbrella group of guerrilla organizations in Colombia from 1987 to the early 1990s. The Revolutionary Armed Forces of Colombia, the 19th of April Movement, the National Liberation Army, the Popular Liberation Army, Workers Revolutionary Party and the Movimiento Armado Quintin Lame were all members of the CGSB. Subsequently, the FARC-EP and the ELN only continued in the Coordinator until 1994 to continue the armed struggle separately, after the M-19, the Quintin Lame, the EPL, and the WRPC all dissolved in the early 1990s.

== History ==
The first meeting of the CGSB was held in 1987. In April 1988 the II conference of the movement would be held and in August of the same year a third meeting. Two meetings were also held in 1989, one in February and one in April, while in 1990 the First Summit of Commanders was held.

On July 6, 1991, representatives of the CGSB and the Colombian Government met in Caracas, Venezuela then in Tlaxcala, Mexico. On May 4, 1992, the talks broke down.

In 1992 the CGSB presented the government with a document of twelve proposals for the construction of peace.

On November 20, a group of Colombian intellectuals wrote to the CGSB proposing their demobilization and initiating peace talks due to the loss of validity of their armed struggles, to which the CGSB responded on December 2 that the lack of peace was by the government and that they should continue to seek paths of peace.

The CGSB would be dissolved in 1994, due to disputes between the ELN and the FARC-EP.

In 2015 it was proposed to reconstitute said Coordinator in favor of dialogues with the government, which did not materialize and the FARC-EP demobilized in 2016, leaving only the ELN as the current armed group.

== Mentions ==
- Julián Conrado in his vallenato "Regreso Simón"

== See also ==
- People's Revolutionary Army (Colombia)
