= FARC dissidents =

FARC members continuing to fight since 2016

- Carlos Patiño Frente FARC-EP, Estado Mayor Central FARC-EP, FARC-EP Segunda Marquetalia
- Leaders: "Cabuyo"; Gentil Duarte (alleged) †; Jesús Santrich †; "The Poet"; Rogelio Guerrero; Iván Márquez; Ivan Mordisco
- Dates active: 2016–present
- Ideology: Communism; Marxism–Leninism; Guevarism; Foco theory; Bolivarianism; Left-wing nationalism; Revolutionary socialism
- Political position: Far-left
- Wars: the Colombian conflict

FARC dissidents (Spanish: Disidencias de las Farc), including the Carlos Patiño Front, are groups of former members of the Revolutionary Armed Forces of Colombia (FARC) who refused to lay down their arms after the Colombian peace process concluded in 2016, and, in some cases, have resumed their insurgency against the government of Colombia. In 2026, the dissidents numbered some 10 999armed combatants with an unknown number of civilian militia supporting them. The FARC dissidents have become "an increasing headache" for the Colombian military, which has had to simultaneously fight against them, the Popular Liberation Army (EPL), the National Liberation Army (ELN), and the Clan del Golfo.

FARC dissidents have been responsible for several attacks on the Colombian armed forces. These fighters are believed to be heavily involved in the production and sale of cocaine. In June 2020, it was revealed that the presence of FARC dissidents in northern Antioquia instigated a direct armed conflict with the Clan del Golfo known as Operation Mil.

These groups are made up of only a tiny fraction of individuals originating from the former FARC. They consist primarily of new recruits joining their ranks, as 90% of former combatants chose to reintegrate into civilian life. Born into poverty, many have said that joining the FARC dissidents gave them a sense of purpose. Unlike other armed groups that offer contracts, FARC fighters are required to serve for life without pay, although they are provided with food and accommodation. The current leaders of these “dissident factions” are mostly mid-level commanders from the former organization, disillusioned with a peace process they regard as a dead end.

== Organization ==
=== Leadership and membership ===
FARC dissidents have been led by former mid-level commanders such as alias Gentil Duarte, alias Euclides Mora, alias Jhon 40, alias Giovanny Chuspas and alias Julián Chollo. The group has attempted to recruit locals in the department of Putumayo to take up their cause. On October 15, 2020, President Iván Duque announced that a FARC dissent member known by the alias of "Cabuyo" was now the head of the FARC dissidents.

=== Locations ===
Dissidents of FARC's 1st Front are located in the eastern plains of Colombia. Jhon 40 and their dissident 43rd Front moved into the Amazonas state of western Venezuela where they can operate with Colombian allies. Venezuela has served as the primary location for many FARC dissidents. Other dissidents hide in the mountains north of Medellín. In 2018, Cabuyo was reported to be based in the north of Antioquia.

These groups have constituted a form of parallel state in very poor rural areas historically marked by the absence of the state they control. They manage disputes of all kinds, such as divorce and theft, organize public works, and impose taxes on economic activities. Prostitution, gambling and drug use are prohibited. Some of the population viewed this presence favorably: "FARC exerts a positive control, thanks to which these regions are healthy. The government looks down on them, but in this village you can go to bed with money in your pocket, it's always there when you wake up. In other areas, you will wake up without even your clothes."

=== Aims and ideology ===
Despite claiming to still follow the leftist ideology of FARC, many dissidents are more motivated in their continuing struggle against the government by difficulty with reintegrating into civilian society, a desire to protect themselves from other paramilitary or crime groups, and criminal connections. Dissident groups would become part of the rivalries between the different drug cartels, allying with some and fighting against others.

== Events ==
On 15 July 2018, the Colombian and Peruvian governments launched a joint military effort known as Operation Armageddon to combat FARC dissidents. Peru issued a 60-day state of emergency in its Putumayo province, an area bordering both Colombia and Ecuador. On the first day alone, more than 50 individuals were arrested in the operation, with the majority being Colombian nationals, while four cocaine labs were dismantled.

On 28 July 2019, during the XXV São Paulo Forum hosted in Caracas, Venezuela, Venezuelan President Nicolás Maduro declared that the FARC-EP dissident leaders Iván Márquez and Jesús Santrich were "welcome" in Venezuela and to the São Paulo Forum.

On 26 June 2020, Clan del Golfo and FARC dissidents were confirmed to be in a direct armed conflict in northern Antioquia known as Operation Mil. The Clan del Golfo, which dispatched 1,000 of its paramilitaries from Urabá, southern Córdoba and Chocó, hopes to remove FARC dissent from northern Antioquia and take control of the entire municipality of Ituango.

On 21 March 2021, the National Bolivarian Armed Forces of Venezuela launched a large-scale military operation against FARC dissidents in Apure, Venezuela. The 2021 Apure clashes resulted in the mass displacement of over 5,000 civilians to Colombia.

On 25 May 2022, Colombian and Venezuelan intelligence officials confirmed the death of Miguel Botache Santillana, alias Gentil Duarte, the top leader of the FARC dissidents.

On 17 October 2024, a prison vehicle that was transporting the serial killer Manuel Octavio Bermúdez was ambushed while travelling on the Pan-American Highway in the department of Cauca. The assailants opened fire, killing Bermúdez, two guards, and another inmate. The attack was blamed on FARC dissidents.

On 13 August 2025, FARC dissidents conducted a drone attack targeting Colombian Navy and Colombian Armed Forces who were manning a checkpoint on the Naya River in south-west Colombia, killing three and wounding four.

On 21 August 2025, FARC dissidents shot down a Sikorsky UH-60 Black Hawk over a mountain during an anti-narcotics mission in Amalfi, Antioquia, with a drone, killing 13 police officers and injuring three others. On the same day, in Cali, a car bomb targeting the Marco Fidel Suárez Air Base killed 6 civilians, including a child, and injured 71 others. A second bomb laden truck did not go off but was deactivated by authorities, two FARC dissidents were captured from the site. The attacks were the bloodiest terrorist attacks since 2019.

On 24 August 2025, Colombian military killed eleven FARC dissidents including a commander, in clashes in the El Retorno municipality in the department of Guaviare.

A total of 34 Colombian soldiers were taken captive while attempting to evacuate El Retorno municipality on 26 August 2025.

On 25 April 2026, a bomb exploded on the Pan-American Highway in the municipality of Cajibío, killing 20 people and injuring 36. On April 28, police arrested José Vitonco, an alleged guerrilla leader with connects to FARC leader Iván Mordisco.

== See also ==
- 2021 Apure clashes
- Dissident Irish Republicans
