= Ivan Mordisco =

Colombian guerrilla leader (born 1974)

Néstor Gregorio Vera Fernández
- Born: 8 October 1974 (age 51); El Peñón, Cundinamarca, Colombia
- Known for: Commander of the FARC-EP dissident group Estado Mayor Central

Néstor Gregorio Vera Fernández (born 8 October 1974), better known by his alias Iván Mordisco, is a Colombian guerrilla leader. He is the commander of the Estado Mayor Central, a dissident group that broke away from the Revolutionary Armed Forces of Colombia – People's Army (FARC-EP).

Mordisco was a member of the FARC-EP and, after opposing the peace agreement signed between the Colombian government and the FARC-EP, he joined the dissidents.

== Biography ==
=== Militancy in the FARC-EP ===
Mordisco joined the FARC-EP as a rank‑and‑file guerrilla in 1995, at the age of 21, and was assigned to the FARC-EP's 39th Front. He specialised as a sniper and an explosives expert.

In August 1998, Mordisco took part in the Miraflores attack in the department of Guaviare, in which 15 military and police personnel were killed and 130 were captured. In November of the same year, he participated in another operation in Mitú, which resulted in 43 deaths and 61 police officers captured.

From 2012 to 2016, he served as commander of the FARC-EP's 1st Front (Armando Ríos), after the capture of alias 'César' in 2009 and replacing alias 'Kokoriko'.

=== Militancy in the Estado Mayor Central ===
Mordisco opposed the demobilisation of the guerrilla group as part of the peace agreement, being the first commander to declare himself in dissidence.

After the death of alias 'Rodrigo Cadete' in 2019, he reportedly led a plan to unite the various FARC dissident groups under his command following the death of alias 'Gentil Duarte'. His area of operations extended across several departments, including Norte de Santander, Arauca, Cauca, Guaviare, Vaupés, Vichada, and Meta. He was implicated in drug trafficking, terrorism, illegal mining, extortion, illegal recruitment, and the murder of social leaders and indigenous people, among other crimes. He was wounded in a military operation in 2020.

He has three outstanding arrest warrants and has been accused of the attack on the infantry battalion in Granada (Meta), which left two dead in February 2022; the murder of nine soldiers in San José del Guaviare (Guaviare) in July 2021; the kidnapping of 17 members of a medical mission in Guaviare in December 2019; and the kidnapping of a UN official in Calamar (Guaviare) in 2017.

He was believed to have been killed in an airstrike in the Santa Rita district of San Vicente del Caguán (Caquetá). This occurred during Operation Jupiter, carried out by the Public Force of Colombia. In this airstrike, seven of the nine bodies found were identified, including two minors. A few days before the attack, he recorded a video in which he proposed a ceasefire and peace negotiations to the government of Gustavo Petro. Mordisco appeared in a video released on 23 September 2022, in which he gave a speech calling for a halt to guerrilla activities.

In April 2023, he appeared in San Vicente del Caguán (Caquetá) as the commander of the Estado Mayor Central of the FARC-EP dissidents, announcing the group's participation in peace negotiations with the government of Gustavo Petro.

In November 2024, he sent a message to Gustavo Petro's government following an attack in El Plateado, Argelia (Cauca), and the Public Force's Operation Perseo against his organisation.

By February 2025, President Gustavo Petro mentioned him in messages following the National Army's operation that resulted in the capture of Cerro Negro (Nariño). Petro described him as "a drug trafficker disguised as a revolutionary" and designated him the main threat to the country's security. In September 2025, the Colombian government increased the reward for information leading to Mordisco's capture to 5 billion pesos (approximately US$1.3 million).

In January 2026, he reappeared to call for unity among the guerrilla groups in Colombia and Venezuela. In March 2026, a military operation was carried out in which his partner (the mother of his son), nicknamed Lorena, and five members of his inner circle were reportedly killed in an airstrike in Vaupés.
