= Jesús Santrich =

Colombian guerrilla (1967–2021)

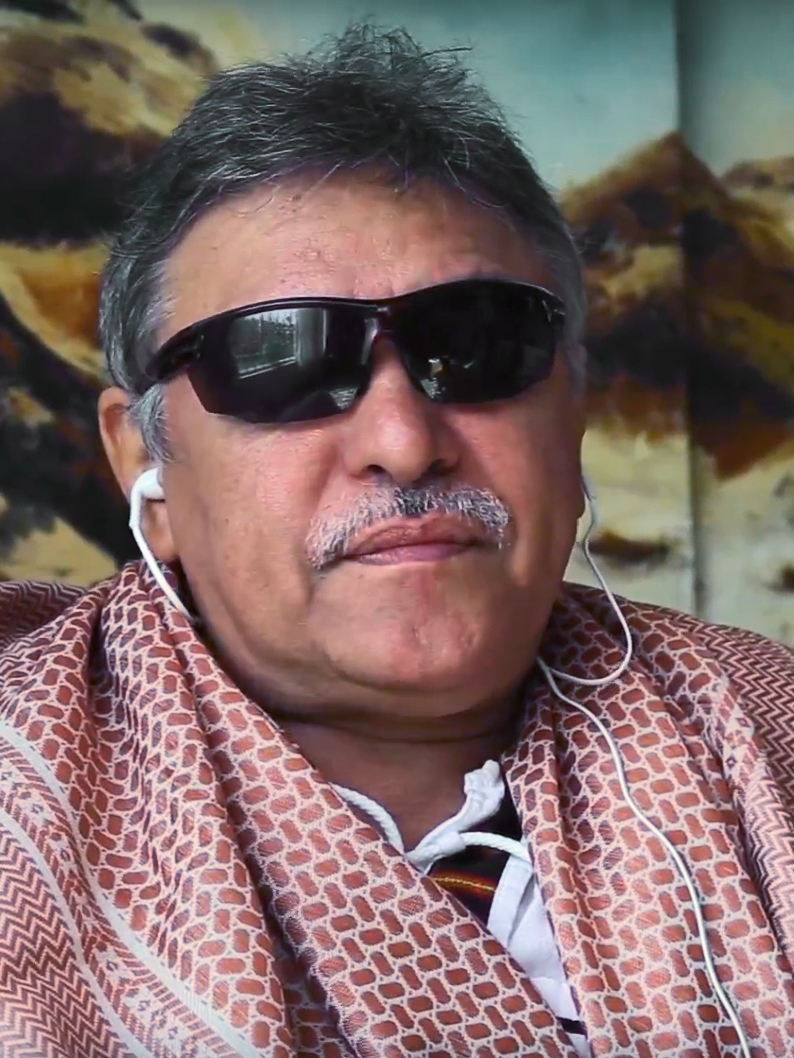
Santrich in 2017

Seuxis Pausias Hernández Solarte, more commonly known as Jesús Santrich (31 July 1967 – 17 May 2021), was a guerrilla leader of the Revolutionary Armed Forces of Colombia–People's Army (FARC–EP). He was a member of the Chamber of Representatives of Colombia until August 2019 and was the FARC's delegate in the Colombian peace process in Havana.

== Life ==
He was a member of a Communist youth organization as a teenager and studied Social Sciences at the University of Atlántico.

He was wanted by the US Government on allegations of drug trafficking, carried out six months after the peace process. A Truth Commission report released in 2022 showed that the charges against Jesús Santrich and his arrest were a plot by the DEA and Colombian Attorney General Néstor Humberto Martínez to jeopardize the Colombian peace process, incite the FARC to take up arms again, and send a message to the public that the peace agreement had failed.

== Death ==
Santrich was assassinated on 17 May 2021 during a shooting in Venezuela. Five other people died in the incident. Following his death several versions were put forward by the media on who was responsible, with some blaming mercenaries, the Venezuelan National Guard and the FARC blaming Colombian commandos illegally operating in Venezuela.
