= Popular Liberation Army =

Colombian communist guerrilla group founded in 1967

Popular Liberation Army Ejército Popular de Liberación
- Flag of the EPL
- Leaders: David León (captured), Francisco Caraballo (captured), Megateo †
- Dates active: 1967–present
- Active regions: Colombia, mostly in Norte de Santander
- Ideology: Communism; Marxism–Leninism; Hoxhaism; Anti-revisionism
- Political position: Far-left
- Size: 132 (official estimate as of 2017)
- Part of: Simón Bolívar Guerrilla Coordinating Board
- Wars: the Colombian conflict

The Popular Liberation Army (Spanish: Ejército Popular de Liberación, EPL) is a Colombian anti-revisionist Marxist–Leninist guerrilla group created in 1967. Most of its former members demobilized in 1991, forming the Esperanza, Paz y Libertad (Hope, Peace, and Liberty) party, but a dissident faction, formerly led by Megateo, known as "Los Pelusos", continue operating. On June 22, 1994, Francisco Caraballo, First Secretary of the Communist Party of Colombia (M–L) and Commander in Chief of the People's Liberation Army (Ejército Popular de Liberación, EPL), was arrested along with his wife, son and several other EPL members. Víctor Ramon Navarro Cervano, alias "Megateo," the leader of the last faction of the Popular Liberation Army (EPL), was killed in a military and police operation in Norte de Santander department in 2015. On December 15, 2016, Megateo's successor Guillermo León Aguirre, alias “David León,” was captured in Medellín. 40 days after the capture of David León, the body of his successor Jade Navarro Barbaso, alias “Caracho,” was still not found after disappearing.

By 2017, the group was estimated to have only 132 members and only had a presence in 10 municipalities of Catatumbo, located in the department of Norte de Santander. It has also been reported that some people identifying themselves as EPL members were actually FARC dissidents.

== Origins ==
The EPL was founded by the Communist Party of Colombia (Marxist–Leninist), PCC(ml), a 1967 offshoot of the main Colombian Communist Party that disagreed with the Soviet Union's ideological tendencies.

The new party created the EPL that same year, and implemented its strategy of promoting socialist revolution from a rural base in the countryside in order to launch a future offensive against urban centers, where it tried to insert urban cells, while simultaneously engaging in sabotage.

== Historical development ==
The EPL's first military operations were in the Córdoba Department, on the Caribbean, during the late 1960s. Internal dissension and the deaths of some of its key leaders during the 1970s weakened the EPL's operational capabilities.

The EPL's efforts were initially unsuccessful, some of the group's main leaders were killed in military operations during the 1970s, and it apparently did not gain as much intellectual sympathy or recruits as the larger guerrilla organizations (FARC, 19th of April Movement and ELN), even after the group announced in 1980 that it would abandon orthodox Maoism in favor of Hoxhaism. A small splinter group, the Pedro León Arboleda Movement, named after a deceased 1975 commander, had been created in 1979.

The EPL declared a 1984 cease-fire together with several other guerrilla groups that began and maintained negotiations with the government. The 1985 murder of the group's leader Ernesto Rojas led to the EPL's official breaking of the cease-fire. Unlike the official Colombian Communist Party, the Maoist PCC(ml) did not have official legal status in Colombia at this time.

Military operations executed by the official state armed forces and the actions of private paramilitary groups against the EPL's militants and its political supporters weakened the group and would have forced internal divisions within its structure.

== Partial demobilization ==
By 1991, the EPL had rejoined peace talks with the administration of president César Gaviria and a total of some 2000 people affiliated to the guerrilla group demobilized, including both armed and unarmed members.

A smaller, dissident faction, sometimes calling itself "Ejército Popular de Liberación – Línea Disidente" (Popular Liberation Army – Dissident Line), under Francisco Caraballo disagreed with the demobilization, insisted on fighting and did not demobilize. Caraballo himself was eventually captured by Colombian authorities in 1994 and his faction continued guerrilla operations on a smaller scale.

Most of the demobilized guerrillas formed Esperanza, Paz y Libertad (Hope, Peace, and Liberty), a political party, which claimed to defend the interests of workers and labor unions, especially around the Urabá area in the departments of Antioquia and Córdoba.

However, according to Anthropology Professor Lesley Gill, "many of the EPL rank and file switched sides and exposed other guerrillas and their supporters to BCB (paramilitaries)". As a result, this behavior 'sowed a sense of panic, as most people had some type of interaction with them through family or neighborhood ties, a business deal, school, a friendship or romance, or simply because they said hello to each other in the street. Few people were free from possible exposure". It was in this context of former EPL members working with right-wing paramilitary units that FARC unleashed a campaign of repression against them. The FARC, the remaining EPL dissidents and the ELN considered Esperanza, Paz y Libertad and all the demobilized EPL to be "traitors" and paramilitary collaborators, initiating a series of attacks and assassination attempts on the former EPL members. Some of the ex-EPL members apparently would have eventually joined and participated, individually and allegedly without the support of the new political party, in paramilitary operations against the FARC and their former comrades. In 1998, Human Rights Watch reported that the FARC had begun killing a number of ex-EPL members since 1991: "Investigators pinpoint 1991 as the year the FARC began to massacre perceived political rivals in the Esperanza political party formed by amnestied EPL guerrillas and their supporters. The FARC and its urban militias were believed responsible for 104 murders of Esperanza members and amnestied EPL guerrillas from 1991 to 1995." In a 1999 report, the Inter-American Commission on Human Rights (IACHR) also held the FARC responsible for a number of massacres against Esperanza, Paz y Libertad members or sympathizers. Human Rights Watch believed Caraballo's EPL faction to be responsible for a comparatively smaller number of deaths: "According to Esperanza, 348 of its members and amnestied EPL guerrillas were murdered between 1991 and the end of 1995. Of that number, they believe sixty-one were killed by the EPL under Caraballo’s command."

Despite the operational constants carried by the security forces, the group still has a presence in the department of Norte de Santander. One of the latest and more important took place in La Playa de Belén, Norte de Santander Department, in the site two dead men and two captured, all indicated to belong to the Libardo Mora Toro de Los Pelusos front, dissent of the EPL.

== 2013 interview ==
In 2013, Colombian weekly Semana interviewed Ramón Navarro Serrano, alias "Megateo," the leader of the EPL in Norte de Santander. During the interview, Megateo was accompanied by some 50 EPL rebels carrying brand new IMI Galil rifles and Colombian army uniforms.

== Operation Solemn ==
Operation Solemn (Spanish: Operación Solemne) was a combined military operation between the Armed Forces of Colombia that killed Ramón Navarro Serrano, the leader of the EPL at the time, and four other guerrilla combatants. The military operation was carried out by the Colombian Air Force, the National Army of Colombia, and the National Police.

== Controversy ==
It is alleged that the EPL operations are funded in part by kidnappings, extortions, cattle raiding, money laundering and the distribution of illegal drugs.

== Use of name ==
On March 14, 2018, Insight Crime revealed that some FARC dissidents were using the EPL's name.

== See also ==
- List of anti-revisionist groups
