= Cajibío, Cauca =

Coordinates: 2°38′N 76°38′W

- Municipality and town
- Flag Coat of arms

- Location of the municipality and town of Cajibío, Cauca in the Cauca Department of Colombia.
- Country: Colombia
- Department: Cauca Department

Population (2020 est.)
  - Total: 38,932
- Time zone: UTC-5 (Colombia Standard Time)
- Climate: Cfb

Cajibío is a town and municipality in the Cauca Department, Colombia.

== Climate ==
Climate data for Cajibío (Venta De Cajibío), elevation 1,850 m (6,070 ft), (1981–2010)
Month	Jan	Feb	Mar	Apr	May	Jun	Jul	Aug	Sep	Oct	Nov	Dec	Year
Mean daily maximum °C (°F)	24.4 (75.9)	24.3 (75.7)	24.4 (75.9)	24.3 (75.7)	24.5 (76.1)	24.8 (76.6)	25.2 (77.4)	25.4 (77.7)	25.1 (77.2)	24.2 (75.6)	23.7 (74.7)	23.8 (74.8)	24.5 (76.1)
Daily mean °C (°F)	18.3 (64.9)	18.5 (65.3)	18.5 (65.3)	18.5 (65.3)	18.5 (65.3)	18.7 (65.7)	18.9 (66.0)	19.1 (66.4)	18.6 (65.5)	18.1 (64.6)	18.1 (64.6)	18.1 (64.6)	18.5 (65.3)
Mean daily minimum °C (°F)	13.6 (56.5)	13.7 (56.7)	13.9 (57.0)	14.1 (57.4)	14.1 (57.4)	13.8 (56.8)	13.5 (56.3)	13.5 (56.3)	13.4 (56.1)	13.5 (56.3)	13.7 (56.7)	13.7 (56.7)	13.7 (56.7)
Average precipitation mm (inches)	250.1 (9.85)	193.6 (7.62)	248.2 (9.77)	243.9 (9.60)	191.0 (7.52)	92.9 (3.66)	54.1 (2.13)	60.0 (2.36)	107.8 (4.24)	224.6 (8.84)	304.3 (11.98)	275.6 (10.85)	2,246.2 (88.43)
Average precipitation days	19	18	20	22	20	14	10	9	14	22	23	22	208
Average relative humidity (%)	85	85	86	86	85	83	80	78	82	85	86	86	84
Mean monthly sunshine hours	133.3	115.7	114.7	102.0	117.8	141.0	173.6	170.5	135.0	111.6	105.0	105.4	1,525.6
Mean daily sunshine hours	4.3	4.1	3.7	3.4	3.8	4.7	5.6	5.5	4.5	3.6	3.5	3.4	4.2
Source: Instituto de Hidrologia Meteorologia y Estudios Ambientales

== Notable people ==
Musician and bandleader Efraín Orozco Morales was born in Cajibío.
