= 2025 Catatumbo clashes =

Attacks by the National Liberation Army in Colombia

- Part of Catatumbo campaign
- The Norte de Santander Department of Colombia in red, where the Catatumbo region is primarily located
Date	16 January 2025 – ongoing
Location	Catatumbo region, Colombia (Spillover in Zulia state, Venezuela)
Status	Ongoing

Belligerents
National Liberation Army	FARC dissidents	Colombia; Venezuela

Commanders and leaders
Antonio García; Rafael Sierra; Gustavo Anibal Giraldo; Jaime Galvis Rivera	Carlos Eduardo García; Javier Alonso Veloza	(Colombia) Gustavo Petro (Colombia) Iván Velásquez Gómez (Colombia) Juan Fernando Cristo (Colombia) Lieutenant Colonel Miller Fernando Moreno (Venezuela) Nicolas Maduro (Venezuela) Vladimir Padrino López (Venezuela) General Domingo Hernández Lárez

Units involved
ELN Central Command (COCE)	FARC 33rd Front	Colombian National Army; II Division; 30th Brigade; 5th Mechanized Squadron; 30th Combat Support Battalion; Rapid Deployment Force; National Police of Colombia Venezuelan Army

Strength
2,387	412	6,000 (Note: 5,000 regular and 1,000 special operatives)

Casualties and losses
84 surrendered	21+ killed 14 surrendered	Unknown
- 102+ killed 20+ kidnapped 53,444 displaced and 32,000 confined

On 16 January 2025, National Liberation Army (ELN) militants launched several attacks against FARC dissidents in the Catatumbo region (Note: Covering parts of the departments of Norte de Santander and Cesar.) of Colombia, as part of the Catatumbo campaign. At least 103 people have been killed in the attacks, with others injured, kidnapped, and displaced.

== Background ==
The Catatumbo campaign has been an ongoing period of strategic violence between militia faction groups in the region since January 2018 and a part of the war on drugs; it was developed after a 2016 peace agreement between the country's government (under the presidency of Juan Manuel Santos) and the Revolutionary Armed Forces of Colombia (FARC) as an attempt to end the Colombian conflict. The existence of the campaign was officially announced in August 2019 after a Human Rights Watch (HRW) investigation. Colombian media reports that the campaign has directly affected an estimated 145,000 people, with HRW estimating this at 300,000.

== Attacks ==
=== January ===
The initial assaults were perpetrated by the ELN against the 33rd Front of the FARC dissidents, who remained in combat after the suspension of its operations as an armed group. Governor of Norte de Santander William Villamizar Laguado said that civilians were captured, about two dozen people had been injured, some 20,000 displaced in the outbreak of violence, and estimated that more than 80 people were killed. He described the resulting humanitarian situation as "alarming". According to a government report, among the victims are community leader Carmelo Guerrero and seven people who sought to sign a peace deal. Three people engaged in peace talks were reportedly kidnapped. ELN militants were allegedly killing civilians they accused of being collaborators of the FARC dissidents, kidnapping people from their homes and shooting them in the streets. Government forces were able to rescue dozens of civilians and evacuated them from the affected areas. On 17 January Gustavo Petro, suspended the ongoing peace talks with the ELN and demanded that the ELN ceases all attacks and allow authorities to enter the region and provide humanitarian aid to those affected. On 18 January, the mayor of Ocaña prepared the city stadium to receive the displaced and asked the national government to declare a state of emergency. On 20 January, the death toll surpassed 100 following continued outbreaks of violence.

On 21 January, the government officially declared a state of internal commotion and launched a military offensive against ELN guerrillas. That same day, 14 members of the FARC 33rd front surrendered to the National Army of Colombia to avoid combat in El Tarra and Tibú municipalities of Norte de Santander, Among those who surrendered was a minor. Their weaponry was confiscated. Military forces continued offensive operations in the region. On 22 January, the Attorney General reactivated arrest warrants for 31 ELN leaders, including some who had represented the ELN during peace talks. A $700,000-reward was later offered for information leading to the capture of four ELN leaders: Nicolás Rodríguez Bautista, Eliecer Herlinto Chamorro, Gustavo Aníbal Giraldo Quinchía and Israel Ramírez Pineda. An emergency decree came into effect in the region, to last 270 days.

On 23 January, President Gustavo Petro accused Gustavo Aníbal Giraldo, alias «Pablito», of being the mastermind behind the attacks.

On 24 January, the 30th Army Brigade of the Colombian Army began a ground offensive in 11 municipios of the Catatumbo region, following large waves of artillery strikes aimed at clearing the area, the offensive was codenamed Operation Catatumbo and was aimed at recapturing all lost ground as well as bringing the region under government control. The Colombian military deployed a large column of 20 M1117 armoured vehicles to supplement and reinforce the 5th Mechanized Cavalry Squadron deployed in the offensives as well as Santa Bárbara Sistemas 155/52 heavy artillery pieces to partake in the offensive. More than a thousand special operatives of the Rapid Deployment Force were also deployed to the area for the operation. The special forces engaged in heavy fighting supplementing the 2nd Division in multiple areas and were also able to evacuate a civilian family being trapped by the fighting. Colombian Defense Ministers Ivan Velasquez Gomez met with Venezuelan counterpart Vladimir Padrino López in San Cristóbal to discuss the situation and confirmed a military operation with the collaboration of the Bolivarian National Armed Forces (FANB) to fight the ELN on the border with Venezuela.

On 25 January, the 30th Combat Engineering Battalion under Lieutenant Colonel Miller Fernando Moreno also successfully conducted a special operation in the urban area of Tibú following artillery strikes the day prior. Eighty-four ELN combatants surrendered to Colombian authorities, 20 child soldiers were also rescued from ELN's 33rd Front. Fifty five rifles, two machine guns, a sniper rifle, twenty five pistols, 80 mortar shells, explosives, 300 anti-personnel mines, 20,327 rounds of ammunition and communications equipment were also seized. A high-pitched battle was fought in the southeast of El Tarra resulting in victory by the army and advances by its forces. A Colombian army vehicle was ambushed while conducting "stabilization operations", Colombian military reported no losses but three ELN members involved in the ambush were captured. On 27 January, further fighting continued and 13 dead bodies of FARC combatants including women and two child soldiers were discovered by the authorities in the villages of Vegas de Oriente, San José de Vegas and El Rosario, in the district of La Cecilia, three more bodies including a child were recovered later that day. By 27 January, 9,352 National Army troops and 795 police officers were engaged in conducting four simultaneous offensive operations in the region. The Council of State tasked Germán Calderón España to protect and remove minors from Catatumbo.

Alias 'JJ Guaracas', a FARC commander surrendered to authorities on 29 January.

On 30 January 2025, the Colombian military seized weapons of the Venezuelan Armed Forces during an operation against the FARC. As of 30 January, the National Army haf destroyed more than 2,645 ELN explosive devices.

On 31 January, 16 peace signatories had been killed by the fighting and clashes.

=== February ===
On 1 February, the National Army of Colombia announced its most wanted list of individuals involved in the conflict, offering a $500 million pesos reward for information leading to the capture of the alleged ELN members Robinson Navarro Flores (alias Alfred), Oscar Emiro Perez Alvarez (alias Arbey), and Leonel Salazar Roa (alias Gonzalo Satellite).

The announcement, coming in the form of a poster, also offered a $100 million pesos reward for information leading to the capture of those described as "planning and executing criminal activities in the region":

- Diego Fernando Coronel (alias Caballo de Guerra)
- Samir Duran Duran
- Schneider Segundo Pallares Toro (alias Mocho Giovanny)
- Jose del Carmen Avendaño Guerrero (alias Rumbala)
- José Antonio Vargas Esteban (alias Diego)
- Wilmar Antonio Salazar López (alias Yimi)
- Luz Amanda Pallares Pallares (alias Silvana Guerrero)

Peace Commissioner Otty Patiño acknowledged that the Colombian government did not analyze warnings ahead of the attacks. On 4 February, a humanitarian aid convoy entered Catatumbo and a humanitarian commission was also announced.

On 5 February, an ELN guerrilla was killed and two were captured in clashes with the National Army. ELN fighters also attacked the 30th Combat Engineer Battalion in Tibú destroying pieces of equipment.

On 6 February, new decrees were issued by the national government to address the crisis in Catatumbo.

On 7 February, the National Army reports that the ELN started taking refuge in civilian homes and using residential areas as "human shields".

Mocho Olmedo, a leader of the FARC-EP dissidents have surrendered to the National Army on 8 February following ELN attacks.

On 10 February, ELN commander Antonio García acusa accused Gustavo Petro of working with FARC-EP Dissidents and Gustavo Petro alleged that ELN was receiving support from Sinaloa Cartel.

On 11 February, movements were restricted in the Catatumbo region. On 17 February, government launched a campaign to provide minimum wages to all those famers who willingly destroy their narcotics crops.

On 18 February, FARC-EP dissidents and ELN threatened to kill and "eliminate" all LGBT from the region.

On 20 February, a soldier and four civilians were killed by ELN in catatumbo. A police officer was also injured in a bomb attack on a police station in Cucuta.

=== March ===
On March 1, three bodies, pistols and a gas cylinder were discovered in Tibú, Norte de Santander. The victims were identified as two civilians and an ELN member. Also on March 1, the Colombian Army announced that an ELN flag was set up in Saravena, Arauca Department, and when security forces tried to take it down, an explosive device detonated. No casualties or damage were reported.

On 3 March 3, ELN handed over 22 hostages to the humanitarian commission after keeping them in custody for 45 days. Also on 3 March, ELN conducted a drone attack in Teorama killing a soldier.

On 6 March, the national government appointed Brigadier General Mario Contreras as military commander for the Catatumbo region.

On 7 March, ElN conducted a drone attack in Tibú killing a soldier and wounding three more and in another attack in Convención at the same time, a soldier was injured by an ELN sniper.

On 10 March, ELN attacked the National Army in the Miraflores area of La Playa de Belén killing 1 soldier, five civilians were also killed in Ocaña, the same day.

=== July ===
On 21 July, rebels in northeastern Colombia used a drone to attack a military patrol in a rural area. 3 soldiers were killed and 8 others were injured. The army blamed the attack on the ELN.

== Impact ==
Officials deployed over 5,000 troops throughout the region and prepared to send 10 tonnes (9.8 long tons; 11 short tons) of food and hygiene kits to displaced people in the communities of Ocaña and Tibú. Colombia's army rescued and evacuated dozens of people and animals using helicopters.

As of 20 January, about 19,800 people were displaced, of which 11,000 fled to the city of Cúcuta.

On 20 January, a state of emergency was declared by Colombian president Gustavo Petro in the Catatumbo region.

The Office of the Inspector General of Colombia reported that around 46,000 children have not been able to begin the academic year due to the violence and that about 35% of the displaced population are under 18.

On 24 January, President Petro issued a decree giving himself emergency powers to restore order in the Catatumbo region for a period of 270 days.

On 29 January, the Colombian government announced new temporary taxes on gambling, oil and coal exploration, and stamp duties to address the crisis in Catatumbo.

On 30 January, decrees favoring farmers of Catatumbo were issued to garner local support. The position of the Military Commander of Catatumbo was established to deal with the situation.

On 31 January, 90% subsidies were announced for public services in catatumbo.

More than 3,500 hectares of land in Catatumbo was administratively expropriated by the government.

On 24 February, United command post handed over its duties to the military.

On 26 February, 1,282 hectares of land were transferred to the victims of the attacks.

On 3 March, in a televised cabinet meeting, the national government announced a peace plan. and a plan to eradicate 25,000 hectares of cocaine plantations in the Catatumbo region.

On 7 March, the government announced four road projects in the region including the Catatumbo Transversal, to be built and operated by the National Army.

On 8 March, President Gustavo Petro signed the Social Pact for Catatumbo.

On 9 March, a peace plan was announced between the National Government and the FARC-EP dissidents of the 33rd Front.

== Spillover ==
On January 31, Venezuelan President Nicolás Maduro announced Operation Lightning against "drug trafficking" and "illegal organizations" on the border with Catatumbo. The next day, Venezuelan authorities destroyed 3 camps of "illegal armed groups" in Zulia and seized 655 kilogram of cocaine and 1,400 liters of acetone. Venezuelan troops engaged in direct combat with ELN from across the border. On February 10, Venezuelan forces destroyed 27 more camps of "illegal groups" on the border with Colombia. On 6 March, Colombian and Venezuelan presidents met with each other to discuss military cooperation.

== Reactions ==
=== Domestic ===
On 17 January, President of Colombia Gustavo Petro suspended peace talks with the group as a result of the attacks. The government demanded that the ELN cease all attacks and allow authorities to enter the region and provide humanitarian aid. In response to the ELN clashes, he stated the group has "chosen the path of war, and a war they will have".

On 18 January, the city of Ocaña enabled the city's coliseum to receive internally displaced persons and called for the national government to declare a state of emergency to address the conflict.

On 20 January, Petro announced plans to declare a state of economic emergency and a state of domestic commotion which provides the executive branch extraordinary capacities to re-establish public order in the region. The Government of the Cesar Department sent humanitarian aid to the towns of González and Río de Oro, which border the Catatumbo region, anticipating the arrival of refugees. In addition, the Mayor of Cúcuta, Jorge Acevedo said that over 11,000 internally displaced persons have arrived at the city since the start of the conflict and requested further assistance from the national government. On 19 January, Cúcuta's Estadio General Santander was repurposed to receive refugees.

On 20 January, officials from Bucaramanga announced that they would evaluate establishing temporary camps for possible refugees. Officials also said they would send humanitarian aid to the Catatumbo region.

The Colombian energy company Ecopetrol said that it would restrict work and movement at the Tibu oil field and the Sardinata gas plant in Catatumbo.

Rodrigo Londoño, former commander of the FARC-EP and leader of the Comunes party, criticized the ELN in a letter responding to the statements of Antonio García, commander of the ELN.

On 27 January, President Gustavo Petro responded to a letter from Jhon Mechas of the FARC-EP dissidents.

120 social leaders from Catatumbo protested in Plaza de Bolívar, Bogotá demanding a meeting with the national government but withdrew following negotiations for better provision of services.

Former ELN commander Carlos Arturo Velandia, alias Felipe Torres, criticized the actions of the ELN and violations of International Humanitarian Law.

Colombian Ombudsman Iris Marín stated that “Catatumbo seals the political death of the ELN.” On 3 February, in a statement, the FARC-EP dissidents accused the ELN of treason.

On 3 February, ELN commander Antonio García accused Gustavo Petro's government of not complying with what was agreed upon in the peace talks.

ELN commander Antonio García accused President Gustavo Petro of treason for the policy implemented in Catatumbo.

On 8 February 2025, high judicial officials held a meeting with regards to the Catatumbo crisis.

On 10 March, ELN accused Gustavo Petro's government of turning the policy of total peace into total war.

=== International ===
On 19 January, the Ministry of Interior of Venezuela said it has assisted 812 refugees in the border town of Jesús María Semprún, in Zulia State.

On 24 January, Venezuelan Minister of Defense Vladimir Padrino López declared that "Venezuela will not serve as a platform for criminal organizations" and that they will seek to work with Colombian authorities to find a peaceful solution for the conflict.
