= Catatumbo campaign =

Ongoing war between militia groups in Colombia's Catatumbo region over drug trade

- Part of the Colombian conflict, the War on drugs, and the Crisis in Venezuela
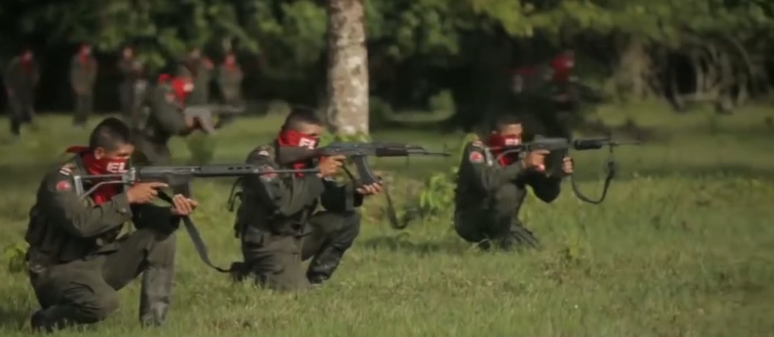
- ELN fighters in Catatumbo, 2019
Date	January 2018 – present (8 years and 10 months)
Location	Catatumbo region, Norte de Santander, Colombia with spillovers into Venezuela
Status	Ongoing

Belligerents
Popular Liberation Army (EPL)	National Liberation Army (ELN); Nororiental de Guerra; Los Rastrojos; Venezuela	FARC dissidents: Venezuela	Colombia; 2nd Division

Commanders and leaders
Mauricio Pácora †; "Pepe" (POW); "Manuel" (POW); "Camilo" †	"Gabino"; Manuel Guevara; "Alfred"	Géner García Molina	(Colombia) Abelardo de la Espriella; (Colombia) Jorge Eduardo Mora; (Colombia) Hugo Alejandro López; Former commanders: (Colombia) Juan Manuel Santos; (Colombia) Iván Duque; (Colombia) Gustavo Petro; (Colombia) Luis Carlos Villegas Echeverri; (Colombia) Guillermo Botero; (Colombia) Luis Fernando Navarro Jiménez; (Colombia) Carlos Holmes Trujillo; (Colombia) Diego Molano Aponte; (Colombia) Iván Velásquez Gómez; (Colombia) Pedro Arnulfo Sánchez; (Colombia) Alberto José Mejía Ferrero; (Colombia) Helder Giraldo; (Colombia) Francisco Cubides

Strength
132 (Note: Official figure as of July 2017.)	2,500 (Note: Estimate as of October 2018.)	33–200 (Note: 33 is a security forces estimate, 200 is a private sources estimate, both as of August 2018. The '33' figure is not related to the group's name.)	5,600+ (Note: As of August 2019.)
- Total casualties: 893+ deaths (Note: 67 (local news reports in August 2019), 281 (local news reports in July 2019, inc. past months up to end of July), 345+ (HRW estimate of extrajudicial killings as of June 2019), 200 (ELN statement of "100 on both sides" killed in clashes between March and June 2018).); 40,000+ displaced estimate as of April 2019

The Catatumbo campaign has been an ongoing period of strategic violence between militia faction groups in the Catatumbo region of Colombia and Venezuela since January 2018. It is an extension of the war on drugs and developed after the Colombian peace process of 2016. The existence of the war was officially announced in August 2019 after a Human Rights Watch (HRW) investigation. Colombian media reports that the war has directly affected an estimated 145,000 people, with the HRW estimating this at 300,000.

== Development ==
=== Beginnings ===
In November 2016, the Colombian government signed a peace treaty with the FARC militia. FARC had been engaging in violence across Colombia, and were absorbed into the government. However, the government still maintains a small presence, and without the organized crime control of the FARC, the Catatumbo region was left in a power vacuum. Seeking to gain control of the region's fruitful drug trade, several different guerilla groups arose or reorganized. Key reasons for groups to focus on controlling the area include the unrestricted access to Venezuela, through which drugs can be trafficked, and the vast coca plant fields for drug production. It is also suggested that Catatumbo is one of few regions where there may be army officers who are willing to covertly work with drug traffickers after the peace process.

The Human Rights Watch describes the War as starting proper in "early 2018", including early alerts by the Colombian Ombudsman in January 2018. Insight Crime places the start of the war as 14 March 2018, but says by this point it "had already been brewing for months without authorities intervening to put a stop to it".

=== Progression to war ===
The main groups vying for control over Catatumbo are the Popular Liberation Army (EPL) and the National Liberation Army (ELN). The EPL had existed quietly in Catatumbo for a long time before the ELN made moves to expand into the region. After the power vacuum, both groups began to assert power over civilians in the region. This caused conflicts, as each group wanted complete control; they developed ways to diminish the influence of the other, including battles. They also used propaganda tactics: one event that "intensified" the discord in January 2018 was a press release from EPL criticizing ELN for guerilla actions towards indigenous people of Venezuela.

A ceasefire had been declared in October 2017 to allow peaceful discussion for three months, but no progress was made, and in early 2018, the ELN and EPL declared "war to the death". This attracted other armed groups, who would lend their support to one side or the other. Separately, the Frente 33 faction of FARC gained its own momentum in the region and became a party to the conflict when trying to exert power. A massive influx of Venezuelan migrants in the later stages of the crisis, many willing to work for armed militia to survive, added manpower to the developing conflicts, and as they are particularly vulnerable, it drove up human rights abuses, too.

In an effort to control human rights abuses, the military were deployed to the area, with over 5,600 personnel assigned to the war by August 2019, as reported by Reuters. Local media suggests the number of soldiers is over 10,000.

== Groups and leaders ==
The three main militia groups involved in the conflict are the EPL, ELN, and a group composed of former FARC soldiers known as Frente 33. From 2019, the Colombian Army has been engaging the groups.

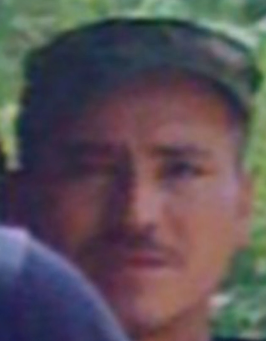
EPL leader Mauricio Pácora

The two leaders of the EPL, who are also known as "Los Pelusos", were Mauricio Pácora (an alias), until he was killed in a military operation in August 2019 at the age of 46 or 47, and Reinaldo Peñaranda, also known as "Pepe" (b. 1978/1979). Insight Crime reported in 2018 that Pácora and Pepe were seen as rivals, having each been the disciple of different past EPL leaders. They had different strengths, Pácora as a military strategist and Pepe as a political strategist, and were matched by a rank-rising member of EPL known as "Manuel", who was seen as the ruthless one in the trio.

One of the ELN leaders, the one which the Colombian Army confirmed to be strategically leading the group in the war, is Nicolás Rodríguez, also known as "Gabino". Leading the section of the ELN on the ground in the region, the Nororiental de Guerra, was Manuel Guevara. Guevara is famous for the 2016 kidnappings of several journalists from El Tiempo and RCN. He went off-grid in 2018, and may have been replaced by a leader with the alias "Alfred".

Frente 33, or the 33rd Front of FARC dissidents, is a faction group allied to Frente 1. A senior Frente 1 leader, Géner García Molina, also known as "Jhon 40", traveled to Catatumbo in early 2018 to help organize the group there. As former FARC militants, Frente 33 is protected from attack or retaliation by a military presence but only to a certain date. The Nation has expressed concern that after this point, the other groups and the military may kill them all.

In July 2018, Brigadier General Mauricio Moreno Rodríguez took position as the army commander for the 2nd Division, active in the war, with General José María Córdova succeeding him at some point before 14 August 2019.

In 2019, a Venezuelan militia group, the Urabeño block, that operates in the Catatumbo region of Venezuela across the border, declared war on the groups on the Colombian side. There have also been reports that the GNB have been helping militia in Colombia.

== Violent strategies ==
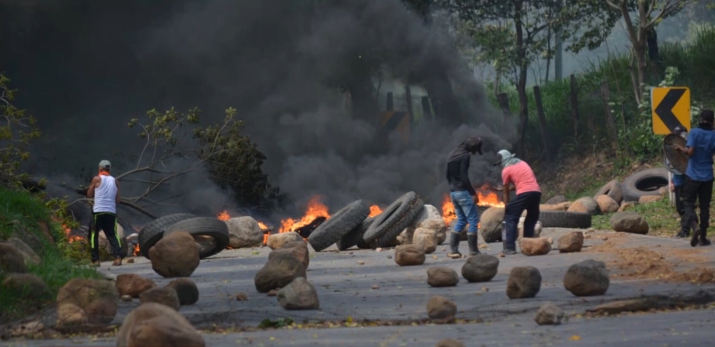
A trancazo set on fire

The militia groups are said to engage in murder and kidnappings of civilians, sexual violence, forcing displacement, and forcing children to join their ranks. They attempt to control civilians through intimidation tactics, including the murder of community leaders and human rights defenders located in the region. Military tactics they have used include reports of planting anti-personnel mines.

Among those killed by militia are nine community leaders and human rights defenders.

=== Displacement ===
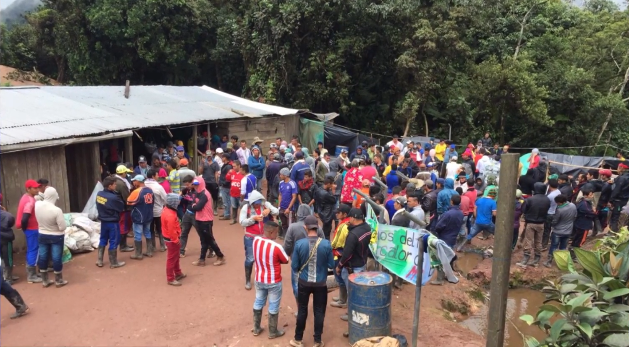
Displaced residents looking for refuge in June 2019

The Catatumbo region is in Eastern Colombia but also covers parts of Western Venezuela, with certain stretches of the Catatumbo River forming part of the international border. During the war, more than 40,000 residents have had to leave their homes in the area according to government statistics. This number includes displacements starting in 2017, though the Human Rights Watch says the majority were counted in 2018. The HRW also analyses the causes of displacement: in 2018, most displacements stemmed from fighting between the EPL and ELN; in 2019, more were caused by the violent intervention of the Colombian armed forces fighting the militia groups.

Besides those being forced away by destruction of land and property, or out of fear for their safety, some have been driven away by threats from the different groups.

=== Effect on Venezuelan migrants ===
The area is one of the border access points for Venezuelans fleeing the crisis in their country to enter Colombia. The "desperate and often undocumented" migrants are vulnerable and targeted for abuse by armed groups. The United Nations (UN) Office for the Coordination of Humanitarian Affairs (OCHA) reports that at least 25,000 Venezuelan migrants live in Catatumbo.

== Battles and operations ==
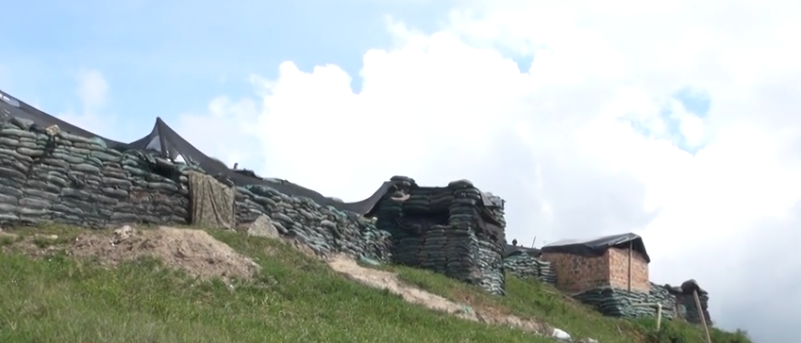
Trenches on the hillside

An offensive front was set up on 14 March 2018 between EPL and ELN, with 600 men fighting to try and finally decide the retake of land and power in the region. This paralyzed infrastructure and closed schools and shops. In April 2018, the EPL announced armed strikes to continue the battle.

The 30 July 2018 El Tarra massacre saw 10 men open fire at a club, killing eight. Though no group claimed the attack, it was suspected to be perpetrated by the ELN, who were growing increasingly concerned of EPL gaining recruits. A few days earlier, the ELN were suspected of a farm massacre on the Venezuelan side of the border.

In April 2019 a military approach resulted in the death of an ELN second-in-command, "Camilo".

The military Operation "Escudo" (English: "Shield"), a programme of 47 operations in July 2019 with more than 1000 soldiers, resulted in the capture of 143 people across the different militia groups. Several of these were leading members of the groups: 26 were ELN, six were EPL, and five were Frente 33. Additionally, 13 were Rastrojos.

In a paratrooper operation undertaken by the 2nd Division on Tuesday 6 August 2019, the EPL leader Pácora was killed. This battle was begun by the 30th Brigade of the Colombian army, confronting the EPL at a base near the Venezuelan border; the brigade successfully took the base.

A 12 August 2019 army reconnaissance mission over suspected ELN territory in Hacarí resulted in three injured soldiers, according to a military colonel.

On 25 August 2019, Norte de Santander Assembly candidate Emiro del Carmen Ropero was attacked by members of Frente 33; before the peace process, Ropero was a leader of Frente 33 and known as Rubén Zamora.

On the evening on 3 September 2019, the house of Betsaida Montejo, a San Calixto mayoral candidate was bombed. Nobody was harmed. It is suspected the attack was perpetrated by the EPL, since the house was tagged with graffiti of the group.

On 6 September 2019, a group of former FARC dissidents in the region were kidnapped and murdered, which Ropero said was, like his attack, "retaliation" of some form.

=== Militia captures and arrests by local police ===
In August 2019, 5 suspected members of ELN, and a 26-year-old man presumed to be a head of logistics for EPL, were arrested by Norte de Santander police in separate raids.

Since 16 January 2025, the ELN launched new operations that killed at least 80 people, injured 20 others and caused thousands of people to flee and peace negotiations between the group and the Colombian government to be suspended.

== Public response ==
=== Protests ===
Protests have been held in the region, with citizens asking for peace. Local dioceses have asked for consideration of the community, saying that "this new war [threatens] the paths, the urban centers" and adding that "[c]hildren at home and in schools must be respected and protected, families cannot be cornered and forced again to move away from fear and the threat of death."

=== Criticisms of military presence ===
There have been criticisms of military presence. Some residents who had been far enough away from the centers of conflict were not affected until the arrival of the soldiers; one farmer had six hectares of his land incinerated by the army so they could build trenches. The number of displacements rose after the army began engaging the militia groups, and there have been incidents of the army mistakenly killing civilians that they believe are insurgents, as well as creating an atmosphere of war in everyday life.

== Human Rights Watch report ==
The Human Rights Watch published a 64-page report on the conflict in early August 2019, based on research conducted in April 2019. The report was titled "The War in Catatumbo". The report was compiled from original interviews, written testimonies in possession of the Colombian government, NGO and international publications, and reviews of official reports and statistics. The HRW conducted interviews with over 80 people in the region, some by telephone and some in person in Cúcuta, and saw written testimonies from almost 500 victims of abuses from the conflicts. The report makes sure to point out that all statistics related to deaths, attacks, and abuses are almost certainly higher than documented because of a multitude of restrictions in recording complete information.

Some of those who conducted the research were interviewed about their experiences carrying it out, mentioning surprise that though Colombia seems like a modern society with a government that has departments to respond to inquiries, this does not operate in some parts of the country, instead there is hyper-control of society in those parts by armed militants. The director of Human Rights Watch Americas, José Miguel Vivanco, assured that despite a peace treaty making appearances good, "[t]he country is at war in Catatumbo!"

The report concludes that "[t]he Colombian government is not meeting its obligations to protect and vindicate the rights of civilians who are victims of the conflict between armed groups in Catatumbo and who are suffering serious abuses by the armed groups" and "[t]he Attorney General’s Office has, so far, largely failed to ensure justice for serious abuses committed by armed groups".
