= Jorge Eduardo Mora =

Colombian military officer and politician (born 1967)

Minister of National Defense
- Incumbent
- Assumed office 7 August 2026
- President: Abelardo de la Espriella
- Preceded by: Pedro Arnulfo Sánchez

Personal details
- Born: Jorge Eduardo Mora López; 23 March 1967 (age 59) Cúcuta, Colombia
- Relations: Jorge Enrique Mora (brother)

Military service
- Branch/service: National Army of Colombia
- Years of service: 1988–2022
- Rank: Major General
- Battles/wars: Colombian conflict (WIA); Operation Casa Verde

Jorge Eduardo Mora López (Note: In this name that follows Hispanic American naming customs, the first or paternal surname is Mora and the second or maternal family name is López.) (born 23 March 1967) is a Colombian retired military officer and politician who is Minister of Defense in the cabinet of president Abelardo de la Espriella.

== Early life and education ==
Mora was born in Cúcuta on 23 March 1967 and raised in the city's La Playa neighborhood. He graduated as an officer in the National Army with expertise in military science from the José María Córdova Military School. He received master's degrees in defense and security at Spain's Nebrija University, in defense and national security at Colombia's Escuela Superior de Guerra (Esdegue), and in international senior management at the University of the Andes. He also studied defense management and command and strategy at the Collége Interarmées de Défense of the École Militaire in France, and took courses at the ESADE Business School, the Western Hemisphere Institute for Security Cooperation, and the Defence Academy of the United Kingdom.

== Career ==
Mora's military career began in 1988. While he was a second lieutenant, he was wounded in a Revolutionary Armed Forces of Colombia (FARC) ambush in Tres Matas, Vichada Department, that killed 16 men. He continued fighting with eight men, supported by two Black Hawk helicopters, for three days until support arrived. He was also struck on his bulletproof vest during Operation Casa Verde, and served in the 7th Counter-guerrilla Battalion of Arauca.

As he rose through the ranks, Mora served as the head of the Joint Department of Intelligence and Counterintelligence of the Military Forces, commander of the Special Forces Division, and commander of the Special Brigade Against Drug Trafficking. In 2021, he founded and commanded the Transnational Threat Deployment Force, which operated against transnational criminal groups. In November of that year, he took command of the Eighth Division of the National Army, one of the military's largest divisions, while being the rank of brigadier general. The change of command ceremony held in Yopal was attended by army chief of staff Eduardo Zapateiro.

Between 2020 and 2021, Mora was investigated over irregularities in processing travel allowances within the Special Forces Division, although the 44th Criminal Circuit Court of Bogotá ruled that he was innocent, and that the unit's captain had falsely used Mora's name to make false instructions appear legitimate.

He retired in 2022 after President Gustavo Petro ordered changes to the military's chain of command, after serving a total of 36 years. He ran for governor of Norte de Santander in 2023, receiving endorsement from the Democratic Centre. He was a candidate for a seat in the Senate in the 2026 general election, but was not elected.

=== Minister of Defense ===
==== Nomination ====
On 6 July 2026, president-elect Abelardo de la Espriella announced Mora as his pick to be the next defense minister starting 7 August. Mora had already been leading the defense transition team after de la Espriella won the 2026 presidential election. In a video published to social media, de la Espriella described him as "a man who has devoted his life to serving Colombia with honor, discipline and loyalty." Mora, who had led de la Espriella's election campaign in the department of Norte de Santander, was the fourth cabinet pick named, following the ministers of finance, interior, and environment.

In an interview with Semana following the announcement, Mora vowed to return to forceful operations against militias, stating that bombings and attacks were necessary to recover territories occupied by irregulars. He criticized Petro's Total Peace initiative, stating that "there was neither peace, nor was it total." Later in July, he held a series of meetings with American officials at The Pentagon as part of talks to establish the "Plan Patriota 2.0", which seeks to expand military ties between Colombia and the United States. On 21 July, Mora revealed details about the plan, stating that its goals included conducting military and police campaigns in areas under threat by narco-terrorists, increasing intelligence and surveillance efforts, strengthening military capabilities, and establishing a regional training center.

==== Inauguration and term ====
Mora was inaugurated along with the rest of de la Espriella's cabinet during a ceremony at the Pichincha Battalion headquarters in Cali on 8 August. On 12 August, he signed a document alongside US Secretary of Defense Pete Hegseth that officially entered Colombia into the Americas Counter Cartel Coalition, or Shield of the Americas. On 18 August, the US announced that it would deliver three General Atomics MQ-9 Reaper drones to Colombia after a visit by Mora.

== Personal life ==
Mora is married and has three children. His brother, Jorge Enrique Mora, was General Commander of the Military Forces.
