= Jaime Vásquez =

Jaime Vásquez may refer to:

- Jaime Vásquez (Chilean footballer) (1929–2015)
- Jaime Vásquez (Peruvian footballer) (born 1991)
- Jaime Vásquez (journalist)
