= 2nd Division (Colombia) =

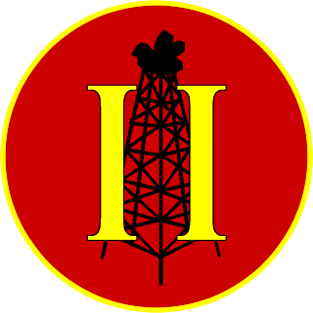
Seal of the 2nd Division of the Colombian National Army.

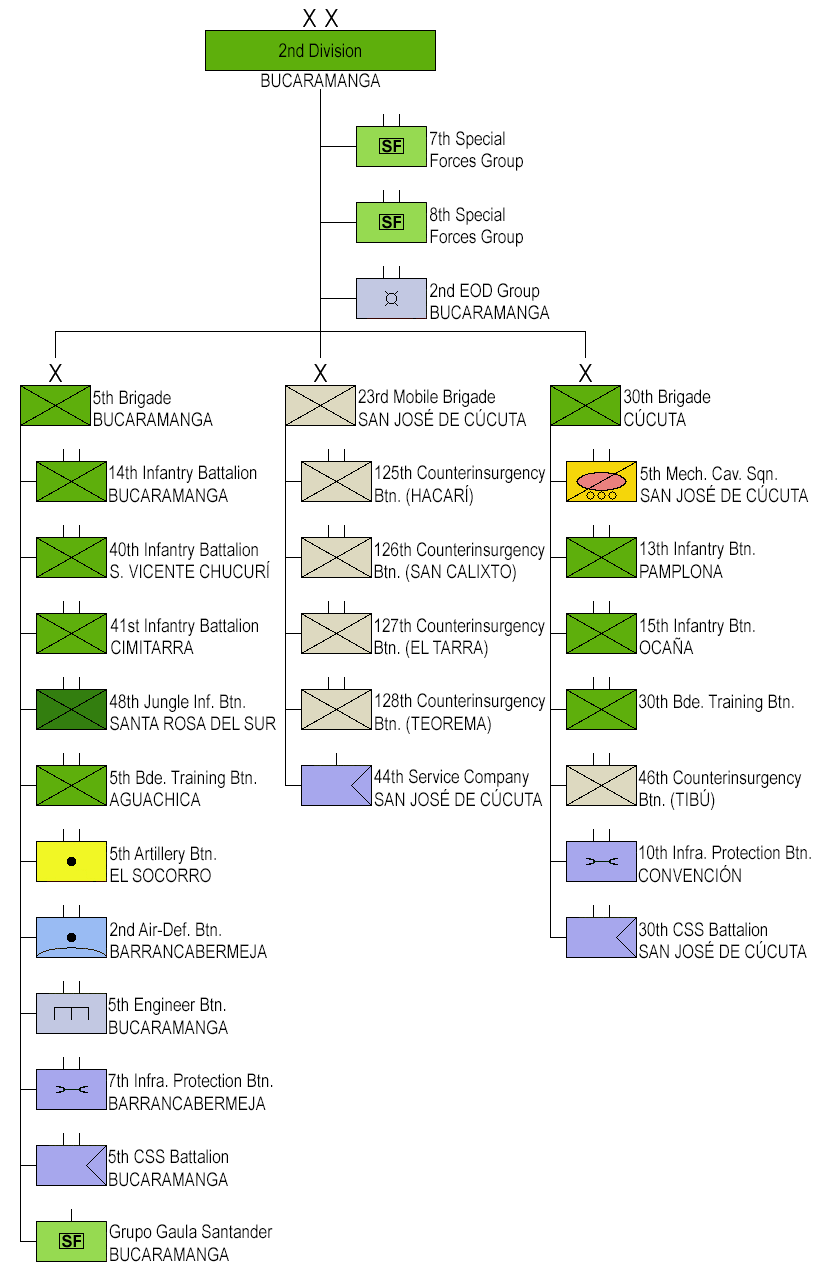
Structure of the 2nd Division of the Colombian National Army.

The 2nd Division (Spanish: Segunda division del Ejército Nacional de Colombia) is a Colombian National Army division based in the city of Bucaramanga consisting on three brigades; The 5th Brigade based in Bucaramanga, the 23rd Mobile Brigade based in San José de Cúcuta, the 30th Brigade based in Cúcuta. The division is supported by the 2nd Explosive Ordnance Disposal Group, 7th Special Forces Group and 8th Special Forces Group. It is currently participating in the War in Catatumbo.

As of December 2023 the commander is general Giovanni Rodríguez.

== Units ==
=== 5th Mechanized Brigade ===
- 5th Brigade HQ (Bucaramanga)
  - 14th Infantry Battalion (Bucaramanga)
  - 40th Infantry Battalion (San Vicente de Chucurí)
  - 41st Infantry Battalion (Cimitarra)
  - 48th Jungle Infantry Battalion (Santa Rosa del Sur)
  - 5th Brigade Training Battalion (Aguachica)
  - 5th Artillery Battalion (El Socorro)
  - 2nd Air Defense Battalion (Barrancabermeja)
  - 5th Engineer Battalion (Bucaramanga)
  - 7th Infrastructure Protection Battalion (Barrancabermeja)
  - 5th Combat Service Support Battalion (Bucaramanga)
  - Gaula Group "Santander" (Bucaramanga)

=== 23rd Mobile Brigade ===
- 23rd Mobile Brigade HQ (San José de Cúcuta)
  - 125th Counterinsurgency Battalion (Hacari)
  - 126th Counterinsurgency Battalion (San Calixto)
  - 127th Counterinsurgency Battalion (El Tarra)
  - 128th Counterinsurgency Battalion (Teorema)
  - 44th Service Company (San José de Cúcuta)

=== 30th Brigade ===
- 30th Brigade HQ (Cúcuta)
  - 5th Mechanized Cavalry Squadron (San José de Cúcuta)
  - 13th Infantry Battalion (Pamplona)
  - 15th Infantry Battalion (Ocana)
  - 30th Brigade Training Battalion
  - 46th Counter-Insurgency Battalion (Tibu)
  - 10th Infrastructure Protection Battalion (Convención)
  - 30th Combat Service Support Battalion (San José de Cúcuta)

=== Divisional Support ===
- 2nd Explosive Ordnance Disposal Group (Bucaramanga)
- 7th Special Forces Group
- 8th Special Forces Group
