= Orú =

- Location in Norte de Santander and Colombia Orú (Colombia)
- Coordinates: 8°38′16.8″N 72°55′12″W
- Country: Colombia
- Department: Norte de Santander
- Municipality: Tibú
- Elevation: 453 ft (138 m)
- Time zone: UTC-5 (Colombia Standard Time)

Orú is a village in Tibú Municipality, Norte de Santander Department in Colombia.

== Climate ==
Orú has a tropical rainforest climate (Af) with heavy to very heavy rainfall year-round.

Climate data for Orú
Month	Jan	Feb	Mar	Apr	May	Jun	Jul	Aug	Sep	Oct	Nov	Dec	Year
Mean daily maximum °C (°F)	31.6 (88.9)	32.0 (89.6)	32.4 (90.3)	31.8 (89.2)	32.1 (89.8)	32.1 (89.8)	32.3 (90.1)	32.6 (90.7)	32.2 (90.0)	31.5 (88.7)	31.2 (88.2)	31.2 (88.2)	31.9 (89.5)
Daily mean °C (°F)	26.8 (80.2)	27.1 (80.8)	28.0 (82.4)	27.8 (82.0)	28.1 (82.6)	27.9 (82.2)	27.9 (82.2)	28.1 (82.6)	28.0 (82.4)	27.6 (81.7)	27.4 (81.3)	27.0 (80.6)	27.6 (81.8)
Mean daily minimum °C (°F)	22.1 (71.8)	22.3 (72.1)	23.6 (74.5)	23.9 (75.0)	24.1 (75.4)	23.8 (74.8)	23.5 (74.3)	23.7 (74.7)	23.8 (74.8)	23.8 (74.8)	23.6 (74.5)	22.9 (73.2)	23.4 (74.2)
Average rainfall mm (inches)	128.5 (5.06)	194.8 (7.67)	241.2 (9.50)	513.2 (20.20)	432.2 (17.02)	303.6 (11.95)	354.1 (13.94)	373.7 (14.71)	440.5 (17.34)	508.1 (20.00)	518.1 (20.40)	364.9 (14.37)	4,372.9 (172.16)
Average rainy days	8	8	9	15	14	13	14	15	16	17	17	13	159
Source 1: IDEAM
Source 2: Climate-Data.org
