= General Rodriguez (disambiguation) =

General Rodríguez is a municipality in Argentina. General Rodríguez may also refer to:

- Abelardo L. Rodríguez (1889–1967), Mexican general
- Antonio Cárdenas Rodríguez (1903–1969), Mexican Air Force divisional general
- Cornelio Saavedra Rodríguez (1821–1891), Chilean Army divisional general
- David M. Rodriguez (born 1954), U.S. Army four-star general
- Guillermo Rodríguez (politician) (born 1924), military dictator of Ecuador
- Martín Rodríguez (politician) (1771–1845), United Provinces of the Río de la Plata brigadier general

== See also ==
- José Julio Rodríguez Fernández (born 1948), Spanish Air Force general
- Juan Pablo Rodríguez Barragán (born 1956), Colombian Army general
- Sunith Francis Rodrigues (born 1933), Indian Army general
- Attorney General Rodriguez (disambiguation)
