= Hugo López =

Hugo López may refer to:

- Hugo López-Gatell (born 1969), Mexican epidemiologist
- Hugo López (athlete) (born 1973), Guatemalan racewalker
- Hugo López (basketball) (born 1975), Spanish basketball player and coach
- Hugo Lopez (Canadian football) (born 1987), Nicaraguan CFL player
- Hugo López (footballer, born 1988), Spanish football midfielder
- Hugo López (footballer, born 2007), Spanish football winger for Villarreal B
- Hugo Alejandro López (born 1968), Colombian general, General Commander of the Military Forces
