= La Gabarra massacre =

Massacre that occurred in 1999 near the Colombian village of La Gabarra

La Gabarra Massacre
- Native name: Masacre de la Gabarra
- Location: La Gabarra, Tibú, Norte de Santander Department, Colombia
- Date: 21 August 1999
- Target: Civilians, alleged FARC members and sympathizers
- Attack type: shooting, mass murder, massacre
- Weapon: small arms
- Deaths: 30–40
- Perpetrator: United Self-Defense Forces of Colombia

La Gabarra Massacre (Spanish: Masacre de La Gabarra) was the 21 August 1999 mass killing of civilians in the Colombian village of La Gabarra, near the Colombia–Venezuela border. It was perpetrated by members of the United Self-Defense Forces of Colombia against those they alleged of collaborating with the Revolutionary Armed Forces of Colombia. At least 30 people were killed.

In 2006, the United Nations described it as "one of the bloodiest single incidents against civilians in Colombia’s recent history".

== Background ==
Since the 1960s, Colombia has been in a state of conflict between the government, drug cartels and paramilitaries, and leftist guerilla groups. The Catatumbo region, in which La Gabarra is located, has been greatly affected by the internal conflict as a hub of illicit cocaine production, with factions warring over control of land. The peasants residing in the region have suffered human rights violations at the hands of both government and paramilitary forces.

The United Self-Defense Forces of Colombia (AUC) was a coalition of far-right paramilitary and drug trafficking groups led by brothers Carlos and Vicente Castaño, active between 1997 and 2006. They were united under the goal of combatting guerilla groups such as the Revolutionary Armed Forces of Colombia (FARC). The AUC was the first illegal group to enter the Tibú area in 1988.

In the summer of 1999, the AUC led a campaign of violence in the Tibú municipality with the stated goal of ridding it of FARC influence. They committed more than a dozen attacks over three months, starting in late May 1999.145 to 200 people were killed in total.

Paramilitary leadership and members had reportedly been openly speaking about their intentions to attack the residents of the area for months beforehand, resulting in local organizations unsuccessfully appealing to officials for protection.

== Events ==
The massacre began when AUC members entered the hamlet of Caño Lapa. Around 150 paramilitary members targeted popular nightclubs and bars, common places for the residents to be on Saturdays. They had with them lists of people they deemed "guerilla collaborators" to kill.

Before their attack, they disabled the lights in the district, and witnesses described perpetrators dismembering victims and throwing their remains into the Catatumbo River. These factors made determining the total number of victims difficult.

== Aftermath and investigations ==
A formal investigation into five officials was opened by the Attorney's General Office of Colombia for the failure to protect the residents during the massacre. One of the subjects of the investigation, Brigadier General Alberto Bravo Silva, had been relieved of his duties on 30 August 1999 for insubordination and omission and removed from active duty on 1 September 1999 by President Andrés Pastrana, but was never charged.

Army Captain Juan Carlos Fernández López and Colonel Víctor Matamoros were indicted on collaborating with paramilitary groups between 1997 and 1999 in connection to the summer 1999 massacres in Tibú.

In an annual report, the Organization of American States (OAS) reported that they had received allegations against the Armed Forces and National Police in relation to the massacre.
