= Mora (surname) =

Mora is a Spanish and Portuguese surname.

== Origins ==
Mora is a surname with old Roman (Latin) origins that originated in Spain and Portugal, but Mora was first found in Castile, one of medieval Spain's most important Christian kingdoms.

Mora translates to "blackberry", which is an edible fruit. In ancient times, this was an industrial surname for someone who grew and farmed these berries.

Additionally, surname "mora" derives from the habitual people who once "lived at one of the many places on the Iberian Peninsula [during the 16th century] called 'Mora'". Typically after people abandoned their original homes and relocated to a new place, they were granted habitational surnames explaining why there are many different surnames.

== Popularity ==
Mora had the highest family population in Missouri during the 1840s. After that, in the United States, the number of people carrying the Mora last name grew by 10,011 per cent between 1880.

Mora is the 1,039th most frequent surname in the U. S., with approximately 29,844 people with the name. Mora is also the 659th most frequent surname in France, with an estimated 7,193 people bearing the name.

== Geographical distribution ==
This last name is most commonly used in Mexico, where it is carried by 183,731 people, or 1 in 676. ‘Mora’ is most numerous in México, where 13% reside in Jalisco, and 13% reside in Michoacán. Overall, "Mora", barring Mexican surnames, exists in 156 countries. It also occurs in Colombia, where 15 percent reside and Costa Rica.

Notable people with the surname include:

== Arts and literature ==
- Barry Mora (1940/41–2021), New Zealand operatic baritone
- Domingo Mora (d. 1911), Spanish born American sculptor and father of F. Luis Mora and Jo Mora
- F. Luis Mora (1874–1940), Hispanic American artist and illustrator
- Ferenc Móra (1879–1934), Hungarian writer
- Hermógenes L. Mora (born 1979), Nicaraguan poet
- Jo Mora (1876–1947), American artist
- José de Mora (1642–1724), Spanish sculptor
- José Ferrater Mora (1912–1991), Catalan philosopher, essayist and writer
- Ken Mora (born 1960), American producer/director of film and animation, graphic novel creator and publisher, voice actor
- Lola Mora (1866–1936), Argentine sculptor
- Manuel Argüello Mora (1834–1902), Costa Rican writer
- Mirka Mora (1928–2018), French-born Australian visual artist
- Norma Mora (1943–2025), Mexican actress
- Pat Mora (born 1942), American poet and writer
- Philippe Mora (born 1949), French-born Australian film director
- Rick Mora (born 1975), Native American actor
- Tiriel Mora (born 1958), Australian television and film actor
- Víctor Mora (comics) (1931–2016), pseudonym of Eugenio Roca, Spanish writer of comic books

== Law and politics ==
- Alberto J. Mora (born 1951), General Counsel of the United States Navy (2001–2006)
- Alejandra Mora Mora (born 1970), Costa Rican lawyer, professor, and politician
- Joaquín Mora Fernández (1786–1862), provisional head of state of Costa Rica in 1837
- Jorge Mora López (born 1967), Colombian military officer and politician
- José María Luis Mora (1794–1850), Mexican priest, lawyer, historian, politician, and progressive (liberal) ideologue
- Juan Mora Fernández (1784–1854), Costa Rica's first elected head of state, brother of Joaquín Mora Fernández
- Juan Rafael Mora Porras (1814–1860), President of Costa Rica (1849–1859)
- Miguel Mora Porras (1816–1887), President of Costa Rica in 1849
- Patricia Mora Castellanos (born 1951), Costa Rican academic and politician

== Sports ==
=== American football ===
- Jim E. Mora (born 1935), former National Football League (NFL) and United States Football League head coach
- Jim L. Mora (born 1961), former NFL and college head coach, son of Jim E. Mora

=== Baseball ===
- Jesús Mora (baseball) (born 1933), Venezuelan ballplayer
- Melvin Mora (born 1972), Venezuelan professional baseball player

=== Cycling ===
- Naima Mora (born 1984), Americas Next Top Model Cycle 4 winner
- Néstor Mora (1963–1995), Colombian cyclist

=== Football ===
- Bruno Mora (1937–1986), Italian football player and coach
- Cristian Mora (born 1979), Ecuadorian football goalkeeper
- Felipe Mora (born 1993), Chilean footballer
- Gilberto Mora Olayo (born 1976), Mexican footballer
- Gilberto Mora Zambrano (born 2008), Mexican footballer
- Iris Mora (born 1981), Mexican Olympic footballer
- José Francisco Mora (born 1981), Spanish footballer
- Juan Luis Mora (born 1973), Spanish retired football goalkeeper
- Octavio Mora (born 1965), Mexican former footballer
- Sergio Mora Sánchez (born 1979), Spanish footballer
- Sergio Mora (1942–2009), Costa Rican-American footballer

=== Other sports ===
- Alfonso Mora (born 1964), Venezuelan former tennis player
- Sergio Mora (born 1980), Mexican-American boxer and former World Boxing Council light middleweight champion
- Víctor Mora (runner) (born 1944), Colombian long-distance runner

== Other fields ==
- Evelyn Mora (born 1992), Finnish entrepreneur
- Georges Mora (1913–1992), German-born Australian entrepreneur, art dealer, patron, connoisseur and restaurateur
- Jim Mora (broadcaster), New Zealand television and radio presenter
- Marie T. Mora, American economist

== See also ==
- De la Mora (disambiguation)
