= Attorney General Rodriguez =

Attorney General Rodriguez may refer to:

- Anabelle Rodriguez (born 1950), Attorney General of Puerto Rico
- Cara Rodriguez (born 1976), Acting Attorney General of Oklahoma
- Jean Alain Rodríguez Sánchez (born 1975), Attorney General of the Dominican Republic

== See also ==
- General Rodriguez (disambiguation)
