= Hugo Alejandro López =

Colombian general (born 1968)

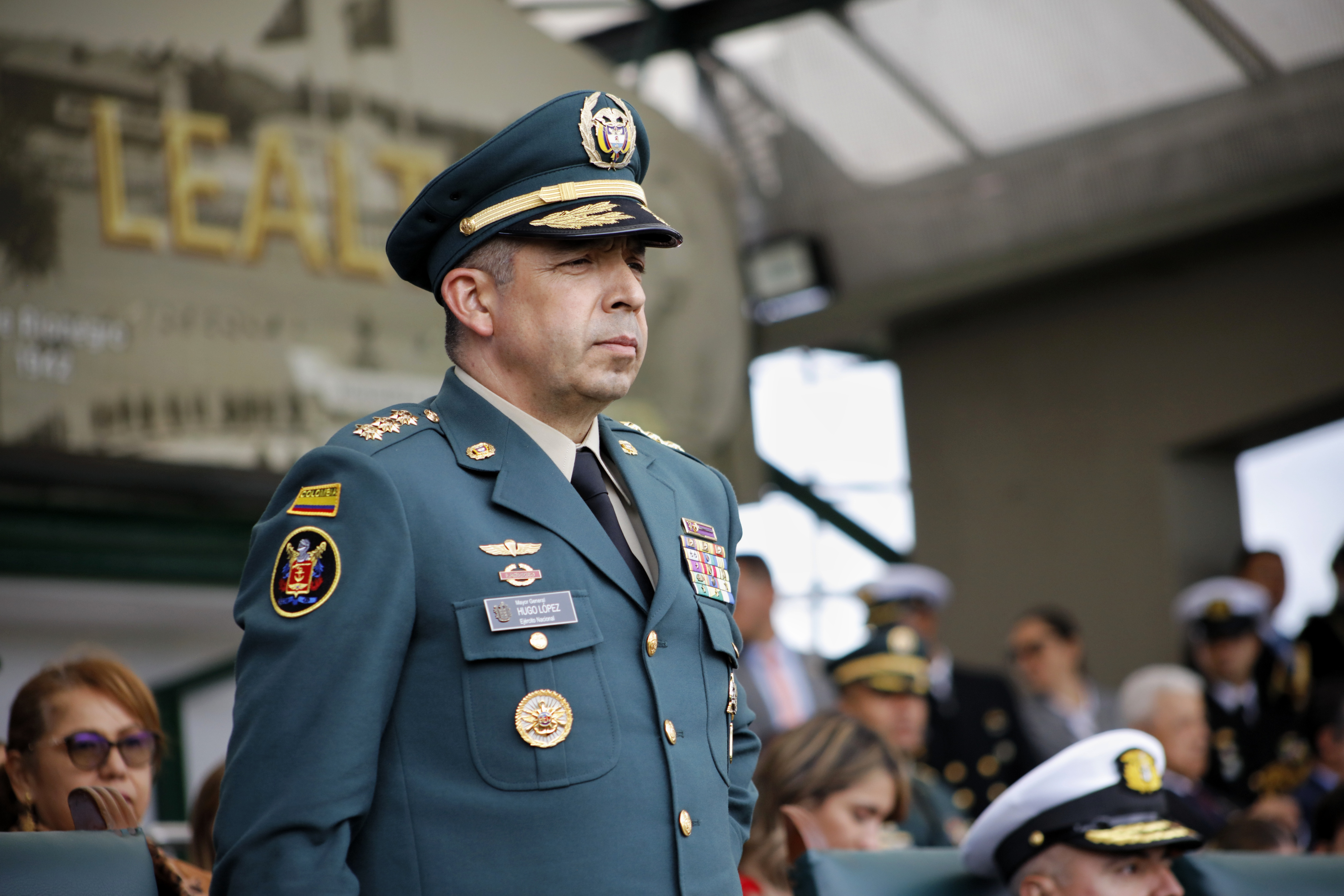
- López in 2024
- Born: Hugo Alejandro López Barreto; 20 September 1968 (age 57); Cali, Cauca Valley, Colombia
- Allegiance: Colombia
- Branch: National Army of Colombia
- Service years: 1987–present
- Rank: General
- Commands: General Commander of the Military Forces; Chief of the Joint Staff of the Militaty Forces
- Conflicts: Colombian conflict; War on drugs
- Education: José María Córdova Military School

Hugo Alejandro López Barreto (born 20 September 1968) is a Colombian general and professor who has served as General Commander of the Military Forces since 2025. He previously served as Chief of the joint staff of the military forces from 2024 to 2025.

Born in Cali, Valle del Cauca, he studied at the José María Córdova Military School. He holds a master's degree in security and defense. In December 2025, López was appointed by President Gustavo Petro as the new Commander General of the Military Forces, replacing Admiral Francisco Cubides.

Military offices
Preceded by José Joaquín Amézquita	Chief of the Joint Staff of the Military Forces; 2024–2025	Succeeded by Harry Ernesto Reyna
Preceded by Francisco Cubides	General Commander of the Military Forces; 2025–2026	Incumbent
Order of precedence
Preceded by Luz Adriana Camargo as Attorney General of Colombia	Order of precedence of Colombia as General Commander of the Military Forces; 27 December 2025 - 7 August 2026	Succeeded by Harry Ernesto Reyna as Chief of the Joint Staff of the Military Forces
