= Alberto José Mejía Ferrero =

Colombian general

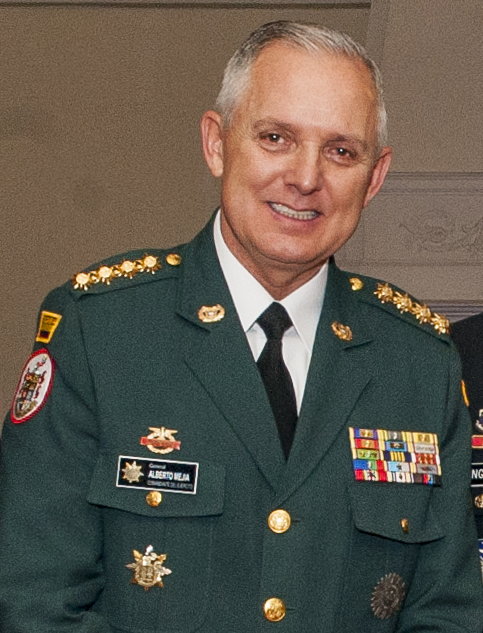
Alberto José Mejía Ferrero

Alberto José Mejía Ferrero is a Colombian general. He served as General Commander of the Military Forces of Colombia.

Military offices
Preceded by Juan Pablo Rodríguez Barragán	General Commander; 2017–2018	Succeeded by Luis Fernando Navarro Jiménez
