= Eduardo Cote Lamus =

Colombian lawyer, poet and politician (1928–1964)

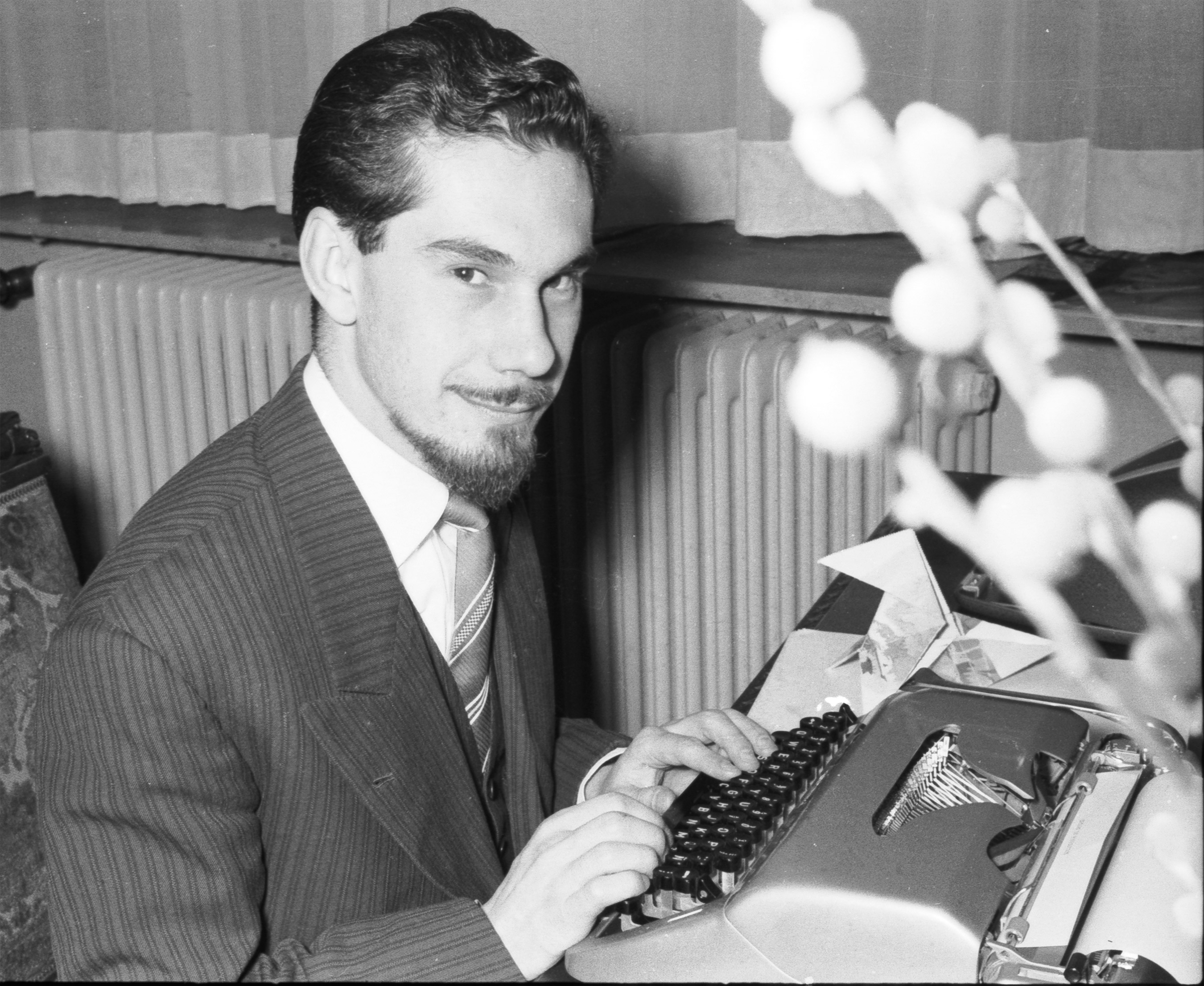
- Eduardo Cote Lamus in Madrid, c. 1953.

43rd Governor of North Santander
- In office 1962 – 3 August 1964
- President: Alberto Lleras Camargo
- Preceded by: José Luis Acero Jordán
- Succeeded by: Álvaro Niño Duarte

Senator of Colombia
- In office 1962–1962

Member of the Chamber of Representatives of Colombia
- In office 20 July 1958 – 20 July 1960
- Constituency: North Santander Department

Personal details
- Born: 16 August 1928 Cúcuta, North Santander, Colombia
- Died: 3 August 1964 (aged 35) Los Patios, North Santander, Colombia
- Party: Conservative
- Spouse: Alicia Baráibar (m. 1958–1964)
- Children: Pedro Cote Baraibar; Elena Cote Baraibar; Ramón Cote Baraibar
- Education: Externado University of Colombia (LLB); University of Salamanca (MA)
- Occupation: Poet
- Profession: Lawyer; Philologist

Eduardo Francisco Cote Lamus (16 August 1928 – 3 August 1964) was a Colombian lawyer, poet and politician.

== Personal life ==
Colombian poet and politician born on 16 August 1928 in Cúcuta, North Santander; the youngest of three. His parents were Pablo Antonio Cote Bautista and Emma Lamus Hernández, his other two older siblings were Elena and José Guillermo. He married Alicia Baraibar in 1958, a Spaniard and daughter of Germán Baraibar Usandizaga, the Ambassador of Spain in Colombia. He had three children with his wife, Pedro, Elena, and Ramón.
