= William Villamizar Laguado =

Colombian politician and engineer

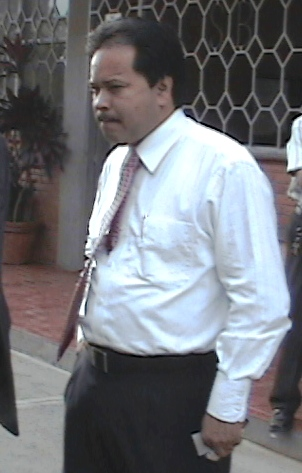

78th Governor of Norte de Santander
- Incumbent
- Assumed office 2024
- Preceded by: Silvano Serrano Guerrero
- In office 2008–2011, 2016–2019
- Preceded by: Luis Miguel Morelli Navia
- Succeeded by: Edgar Jesús Díaz Contreras

Councillor for Cúcuta
- In office 1998–2001, 2001–2004, 2004–2006

Personal details
- Born: 31 October 1965 (age 60) Arboledas, Colombia
- Education: Francisco de Paula Santander University; Universidad Libre

William Villamizar Laguado (born 31 October 1965, Arboledas) is a Colombian engineer and politician who served as the 74th Governor of Norte de Santander, Colombia for the 2008–2011 term, though he was suspended ten days before completing his tenure. He was subsequently re-elected as the 76th Governor for the terms 2016–2019 and 2024–2027.

== Education ==
He completed his primary education in the municipalities of Chinácota, Herrán, and Ragonvalia. He attended secondary school in Arboledas, his hometown, and at the Juan Atalaya Integrated Departmental School in Cúcuta, where he graduated top of his class and achieved the highest ICFES scores of that institution.

He holds a degree in civil engineering, graduating with honours, from the Francisco de Paula Santander University, and is a specialist in Financial Management from the Universidad Libre (Colombia). He also studied Public Management at the Higher School of Public Administration. He was awarded the Gustavo Ararat Negrón Regional Engineering Prize.

== Public offices ==
Villamizar served as a councillor in Cúcuta for three consecutive terms (1998–2001, 2001–2004, and 2004–2006). He was elected Governor of Norte de Santander for the 2008–2011 term, during which he was suspended. In Colombia's 2015 regional elections, he was elected Governor for a second time. However, he was again unable to complete his term, as he was suspended in August 2019.

== Investigations ==
Villamizar was named in a list within an internal report by the DIJIN (Colombian National Police Directorate of Criminal Investigation and Interpol) concerning a case of asset forfeiture. This list was reportedly in the possession of murdered journalist Jaime Vásquez in the city of Cúcuta.
