= Juan Ricardo Rozo =

Colombian admiral (born 1968)

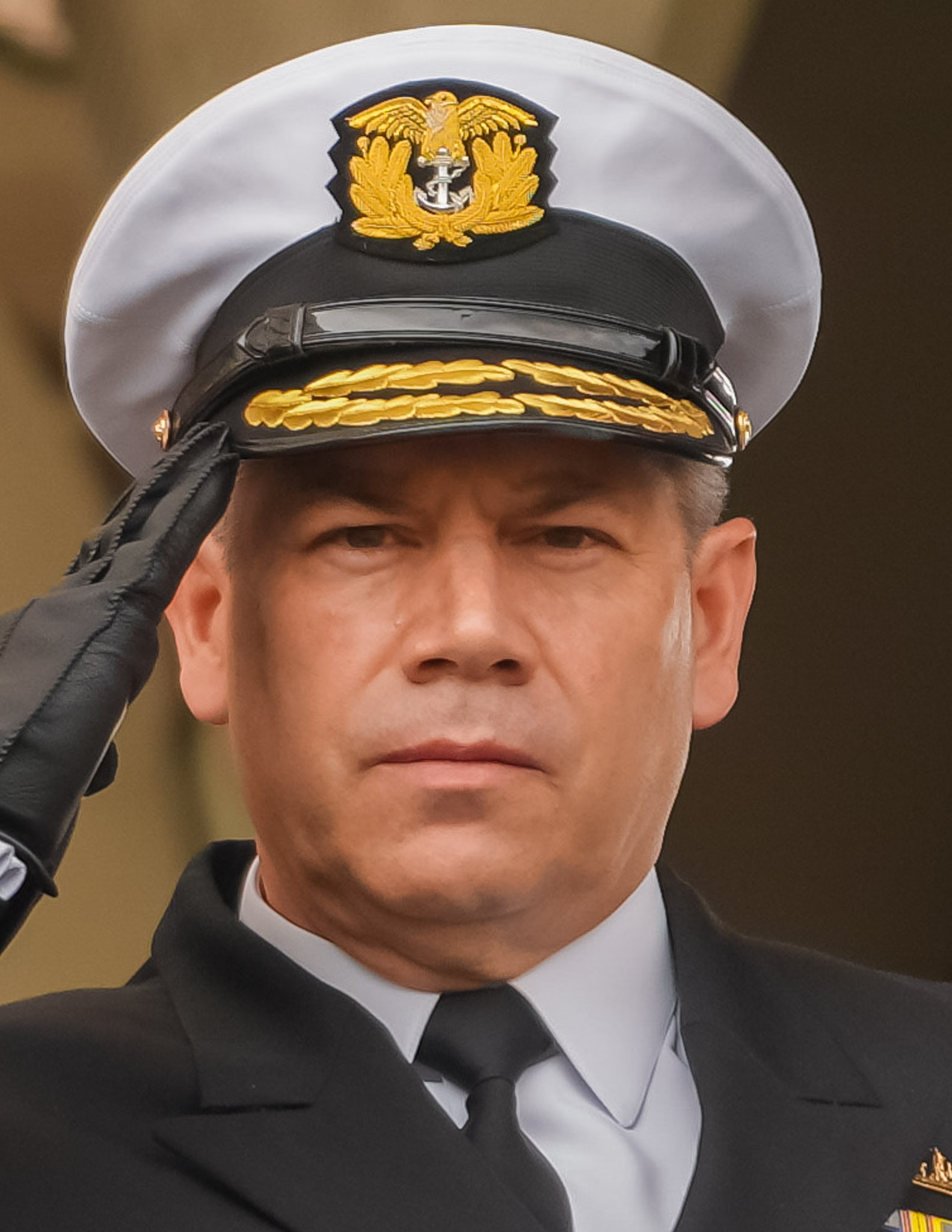
- Rozo in 2024
- Born: Juan Ricardo Rozo Obregón; 16 June 1968 (age 57); Medellín, Antioquia, Colombia
- Allegiance: Colombia
- Branch: National Navy of Colombia
- Service years: 1990–present
- Rank: Admiral
- Commands: General Commander of the National Navy of Colombia
- Conflicts: Colombian conflict; War on drugs
- Alma mater: Admiral Padilla Naval School; University of the Andes

Juan Ricardo Rozo Obregón (born 16 June 1968) is a Colombian vice admiral who has served as General Commander of the National Navy of Colombia since 2025. He served as Director of the Admiral Padilla Naval School and Director of the Barranquilla Naval Petty Officer School.

Rozo is a graduate of the Admiral Padilla Naval Cadet School. He holds a degree from the international senior management program at the University of the Andes. In July 2024, President Gustavo Petro appointed him Commander General of the Colombian National Navy, replacing Francisco Cubides.

Military offices
Preceded by Francisco Cubides	General Commander of the National Navy of Colombia; 2024-present	Incumbent
