= La Gabarra =

- Populated center
- Ubicación Norte de Santander Department and Colombia La Gabarra (Colombia)
- Coordinates: 9°0′0.5″N 72°53′49.4″W
- Country: Colombia
- Department: Norte de Santander
- Municipality: Tibú
- Elevation: 144 ft (44 m)

Population (2018)
  - Total: 4,986
- Time zone: UTC-5 (Colombia Standard Time)

La Gabarra Is a populated center of Colombia located in area of the municipality of Tibú, department of Norte de Santander, Colombia.

== Climate ==
La Gabarra has a tropical rainforest climate (Af) with heavy rainfall from January to March and very heavy rainfall in the remaining months with extremely heavy rainfall in October and November.

Climate data for La Gabarra
Month	Jan	Feb	Mar	Apr	May	Jun	Jul	Aug	Sep	Oct	Nov	Dec	Year
Mean daily maximum °C (°F)	32.2 (90.0)	32.5 (90.5)	32.8 (91.0)	32.3 (90.1)	32.3 (90.1)	32.2 (90.0)	32.6 (90.7)	32.8 (91.0)	32.3 (90.1)	31.6 (88.9)	31.4 (88.5)	31.7 (89.1)	32.2 (90.0)
Daily mean °C (°F)	26.8 (80.2)	27.0 (80.6)	27.7 (81.9)	27.8 (82.0)	28.0 (82.4)	27.7 (81.9)	27.8 (82.0)	28.0 (82.4)	27.8 (82.0)	27.5 (81.5)	27.2 (81.0)	26.9 (80.4)	27.5 (81.5)
Mean daily minimum °C (°F)	21.4 (70.5)	21.6 (70.9)	22.7 (72.9)	23.3 (73.9)	23.7 (74.7)	23.3 (73.9)	23.0 (73.4)	23.2 (73.8)	23.3 (73.9)	23.4 (74.1)	23.0 (73.4)	22.2 (72.0)	22.8 (73.1)
Average rainfall mm (inches)	139.4 (5.49)	130.6 (5.14)	178.3 (7.02)	473.1 (18.63)	581.2 (22.88)	424.9 (16.73)	399.5 (15.73)	500.8 (19.72)	545.9 (21.49)	764.9 (30.11)	672.8 (26.49)	373.5 (14.70)	5,184.9 (204.13)
Source: IDEAM (as Puerto Barco)
