= Luis Fernando Navarro Jiménez =

Colombian politician (born 1960)

Luis Fernando Navarro
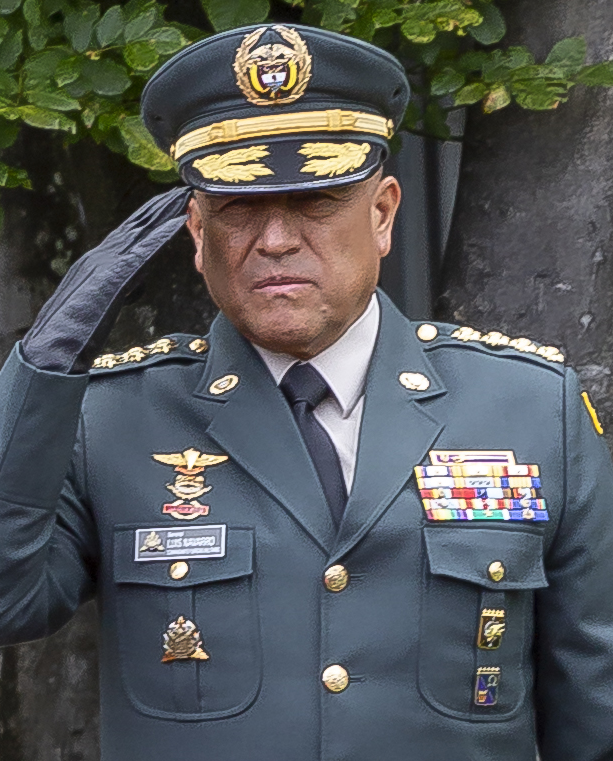

Secretary of Government of Cundinamarca
- Incumbent
- Assumed office 3 January 2024
- Governor: Jorge Emilio Rey
- Preceded by: Germán Enrique Gómez

Personal details
- Born: Luis Fernando Navarro Jiménez; 4 November 1960 (age 65) Chía, Cundinamarca, Colombia
- Education: José María Córdova Military School; University of La Sabana; Pontifical Catholic University of Chile

Military service
- Allegiance: Colombia
- Branch/service: National Army of Colombia
- Years of service: 1990–2022
- Rank: General
- Commands: General Commander of the Military Forces
- Battles/wars: Colombian conflict; War on drugs

Luis Fernando Navarro Jiménez (born 4 November 1960) is a Colombian general and politician who has served as Secretary of Government of Cundinamarca since 2024. He served as General Commander of the Military Forces from 2018 to 2022 under President Iván Duque

Military offices
Preceded by Alberto José Mejía Ferrero	General Commander of the Military Forces; 2018–2022	Succeeded by Helder Giraldo
Political offices
Preceded by Germán Enrique Gómez	Secretary of Government of Cundinamarca; 2024-present	Incumbent
