= General Commander of the Military Forces (Colombia) =

Head of the Military Forces of Colombia

- Comandante General de las Fuerzas Militares de Colombia

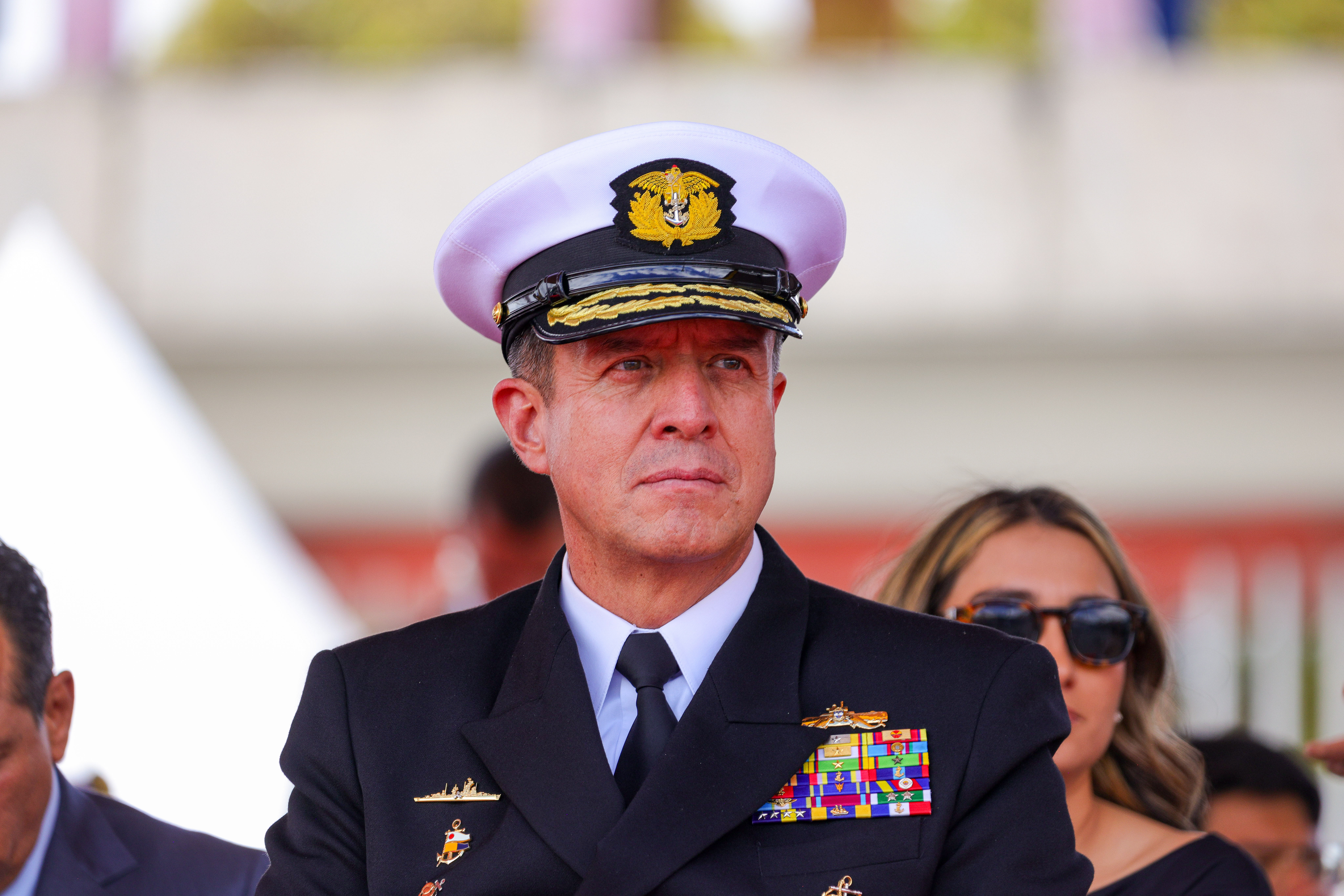
- Incumbent; Francisco Cubides since 4 July 2024
- Ministry of National Defense
- Reports to: Minister of National Defense
- Nominator: President
- Appointer: President
- Website: Official website

The general commander of the Military Forces is the professional head of the Military Forces of Colombia. He is responsible for the administration and the operational control of the Colombian military. The current commander is Admiral Francisco Cubides.

== List of chiefs ==
No.	Picture	Name	Took office	Left office	Time in office	Defence branch	Ref.
1	Gustavo Rojas Pinilla	General; Gustavo Rojas Pinilla (1900–1975)	1950	1 June 1951	0–1 years	Colombian National Army	.
2	Régulo Gaitán	General; Régulo Gaitán	1 June 1951	31 May 1953	1 year	Colombian National Army	.
(1)	Gustavo Rojas Pinilla	General; Gustavo Rojas Pinilla (1900–1975)	31 May 1953	June 1953	0 years	Colombian National Army	.
20	Hernando Camilo Zuniga	General; Hernando Camilo Zuniga	?	11 March 1996	?	Colombian National Army	.
21	Holdan Delgado	Admiral; Holdan Delgado	11 March 1996	1996	0 years	Colombian National Navy	
22	Harold Bedoya Pizarro	General; Harold Bedoya Pizarro (1938–2017)	1996	24 July 1997	0–1 years	Colombian National Army	.
23	Jorge Enrique Mora [es]	General; Jorge Enrique Mora (born 1945)	2002	2004	1–2 years	Colombian National Army	
24	Carlos Ospina Ovalle [es]	General; Carlos Ospina Ovalle (born 1947)	2004	15 August 2006	1–2 years	Colombian National Army	.
25	Freddy Padilla de León	General; Freddy Padilla de León (born 1948)	15 August 2006	6 August 2010	3 years, 356 days	Colombian National Army	
26	Edgar Cely [es]	Admiral; Edgar Cely (born 1952)	6 August 2010	9 September 2011	1 year, 34 days	Colombian National Navy	
27	Alejandro Navas [es]	General; Alejandro Navas (born 1956)	9 September 2011	12 August 2013	1 year, 337 days	Colombian National Army	.
28	Leonardo Barrero [es]	General; Leonardo Barrero (born 1960)	12 August 2013	18 February 2014	190 days	Colombian National Army	.
29	Juan Pablo Rodríguez Barragán	General; Juan Pablo Rodríguez Barragán (born 1959)	18 February 2014	4 December 2017	3 years, 289 days	Colombian National Army	
30	Alberto José Mejía Ferrero	General; Alberto José Mejía Ferrero (born 1963)	4 December 2017	14 December 2018	1 year, 10 days	Colombian National Army	.
31	Luis Fernando Navarro Jiménez	General; Luis Fernando Navarro Jiménez (born 1960)	14 December 2018	26 August 2022	3 years, 255 days	Colombian National Army	
32	Helder Giraldo	Major General; Helder Giraldo (born 1955)	12 August 2022	9 July 2024	2 years, 25 days	Colombian National Army	
33	Francisco Cubides	Admiral; Francisco Cubides (born 1966)	9 July 2024	Incumbent	2 years, 62 days	Colombian National Navy	
