= Francisco Cubides =

Colombian admiral (born 1966)

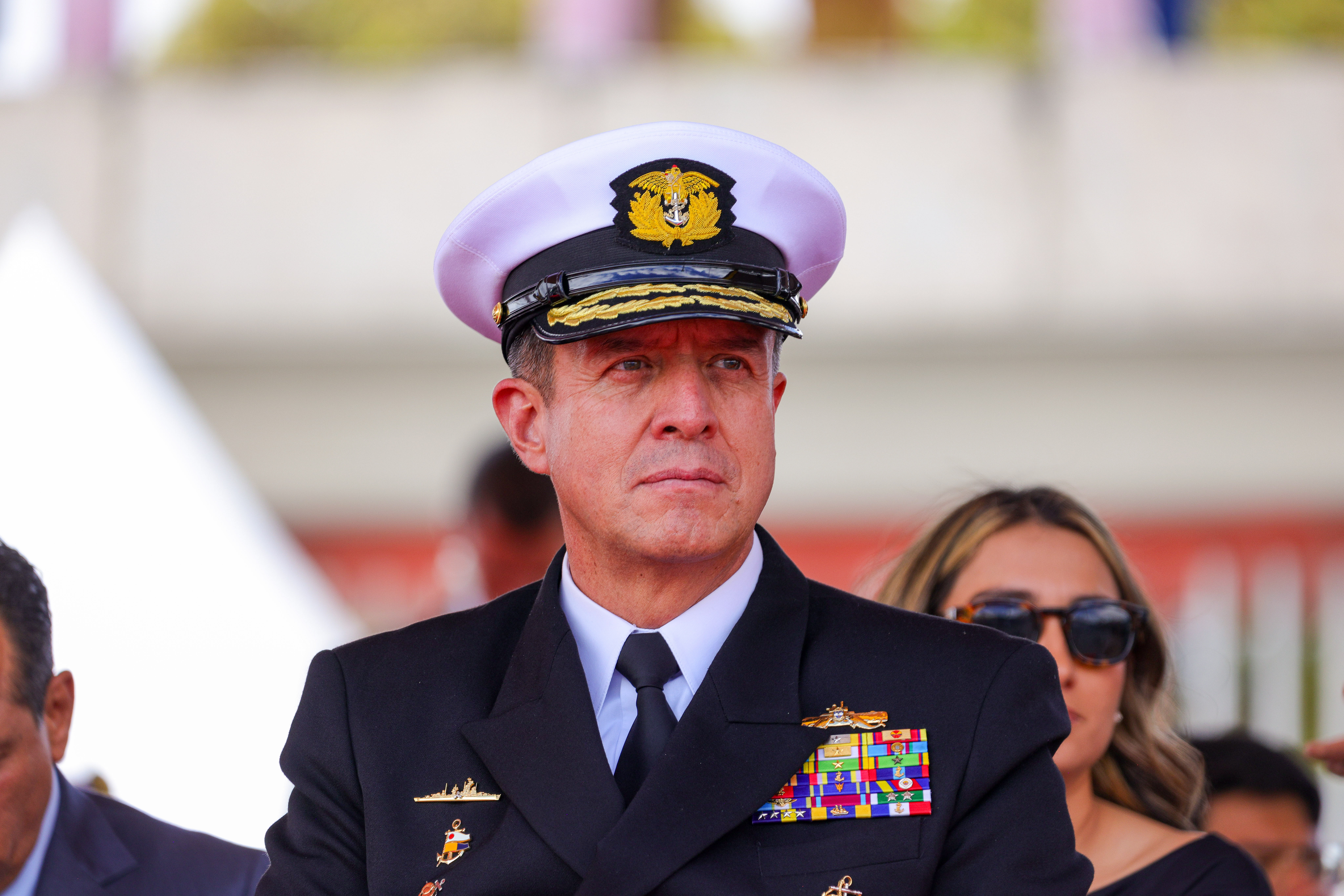
- Born: Francisco Hernando Cubides Granados; 8 June 1966 (age 60); Bogotá, D.C., Colombia
- Education: Admiral Padilla Naval Cadet School; New Granada Military University
- Military career
- Allegiance: Colombia
- Branch: National Navy of Colombia
- Service years: 1990–present
- Rank: Admiral
- Commands: General Commander of the Military Forces; General Commander of the National Navy of Colombia
- Conflicts: Colombian conflict; War on drugs

Francisco Hernando Cubides Granados (born 8 June 1966) is a Colombian admiral who has served as General Commander of the Military Forces from 2024 to 2025. He served as general commander of the Colombian National Navy from 2022 to 2024.

Cubides graduated from the Almirante Padilla Naval Cadet School. He specializes in human resources management and senior management from the Nueva Granada Military University. He has advanced management studies from the Pontificia Universidad Javeriana.

In July 2024, President Gustavo Petro appointed Cubides as the general commander of the Military Forces following the resignation of Helder Giraldo. He is the first admiral in thirty years to serve a general commander of the Military Forces.

Military offices
Preceded by Gabriel Alfonso Pérez	General Commander of the National Navy of Colombia; 2022–2024	Succeeded by Juan Ricardo Rozo
Preceded by Helder Giraldo	General Commander of the Military Forces; 2024–2025	Succeeded by Hugo Alejandro López
