= List of governors of Norte de Santander Department =

The Governor of the Department of Norte de Santander heads the executive branch of the government of the Colombian department of Norte de Santander. The governor is the highest-ranking official in the department, serving as the main agent for the President of Colombia to carry on the task of maintaining public order and the execution of the general economic policy, and all matters of law passed down for the nation. The current governor is William Villamizar Laguado.

The Department of Norte de Santander was created on July 25, 1910, before this the department formed part of the Department of Santander, and as such it was governed by the Governor of Santander.

Before the Colombian Constitution of 1991, the governor was appointed by the president. In 1992 popular elections were held for the first time to elect the governor of the Department for a period of three years.

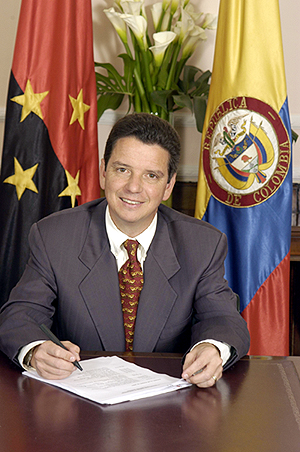
Luis Miguel Morelli Navia, Governor of the Department of Norte de Santander (2003-2007)

Incumbent	Tenure	
Incumbent	Took office	Left office
William Villamizar Laguado	2024	present
Silvano Serrano Guerrero	2020	2024
William Villamizar Laguado	2016	2019
Edgar Jesús Díaz Contreras	2012	2016
Adalberto Antonio Palacios Contreras	2011	2012
Enrique Ramírez Yáñez	2010	2011
William Villamizar Laguado	2008	2010
Luis Miguel Morelli Navia	2003	2007
Juan Alcides Santaella Gutiérrez	2000	2003
Jorge Alberto García Herreros Cabrera	1997	2000
Sergio Entrena López	1994	1997
Álvaro Salgar Villamizar	1991	1994
Antonio José Lizarazo Ocampo	1990	1991
Eduardo Assaf Elcure	1986	1990
León Colmenares Baptista	1984	1986
Clemente Franco Gálvis	1983	1984
Margarita Silva de Uribe	1982	1983
Cayetano Morelli Lázaro	1981	1982
Humberto Latorre Chacón	1981	1981
Adolfo Martínez Badillo	1979	1981
Jesús María Carrillo Ballesteros	1978	1979
Jorge Villamizar Ruíz	1978	1978
Jorge Colmenares Espinosa	1978	1978
Alfredo Yáñez Carvajal	1977	1978
María Carmenza Arenas Abello	1975	1977
Fidelina Villamizar de Pérez	1974	1975
David Haddad Salcedo	1973	1974
Carlos Pérez Escalante	1971	1973
Daniel Raad Gómez	1971	1971
Hernando Ruan Guerrero	1970	1971
Luis Tesalio Ramírez	1970	1970
Argelino Durán Quintero	1968	1970
Samuel Liévano Sánchez	1968	1968
Gustavo Lozano Cárdenas	1966	1968
Miguel Durán Durán	1965	1966
Gustavo Rodríguez Duarte	1965	1965
Alfonso Lara Hernández	1964	1965
Álvaro Niño Duarte	1964	1964
Eduardo Cote Lamus	1962	1964
José Luis Acero Jordán	1961	1962
Miguel García Herreros	1960	1961
Carlos Vera Villamizar	1958	1960
Jorge Ordóñez Valderrama	1957	1958
Rodrigo Peñaranda	1957	1957
Gonzalo Rivera Laguado	1953	1957
Germán Uribe Jaramillo	1953	1953
Oscar Vergel Pacheco	1952	1953
Rafael Canal Sorzano	1952	1952
Luis Moncada Rojas	1950	1952
Lucio Pabón Núñez	1949	1950
Carlos Vera Villamizar	1949	1949
Pablo Rodríguez Achury	1948	1949
Gustavo Matamoros Leal	1948	1948
Manuel Buenahora	1947	1948
Rafael Unda Ferrero	1946	1947
Luis Buenahora	1946	1946
Alfredo Lamus Girón	1944	1946
Manuel José Vargas	1944	1944
Alfredo Lamus Girón	1943	1944
Carlos Ardila Ordóñez	1942	1943
Guillermo E. Suárez	1941	1942
Darío Hernández Bautista	1940	1941
Luis Alberto Lindarte	1938	1940
Miguel Durán Durán	1937	1938
Francisco Lamus Lamus	1936	1937
Manuel José Vargas	1935	1936
Luis Hernández Gutiérrez	1934	1935
Francisco Lamus Lamus	1934	1934
Benito Hernández Bustos	1933	1933
Luis Augusto Cuervo	1931	1933
Gabriel Valencia	1931	1931
Luciano Jaramillo	1930	1931
Ramón Pérez Hernández	1927	1930
Luis Febres Cordero	1926	1927
Rafael Valencia	1924	1926
Víctor Julio Cote Bautista	1922	1924
Francisco Sorzano	1922	1922
Fructuoso V. Calderón	1918	1922
Luis Febres Cordero	1914	1918
Rafael Valencia	1912	1914
Víctor Julio Cote Bautista	1910	1912
