= Murder of Jaime Vásquez =

Colombian investigative journalist

Jaime Vásquez
- Born: Jaime Alonso Vásquez Giraldo c. 1970
- Died: 14 April 2024 (aged 54); Cúcuta, Norte de Santander
- Cause of death: Assassination (gunshot wound)
- Occupation: Journalist

Jaime Alonso Vásquez Giraldo (c.1970 – 14 April 2024) was a Colombian journalist and social media producer who reported on corruption and public governance in Cúcuta, Norte de Santander. He gained recognition for his investigative journalism and his significant following on social media platforms.

== Career ==
Vásquez used social media, including X (formerly Twitter) and Facebook, to share investigative content, often broadcasting live to present evidence such as contracting documents. In 2023, he collaborated with other journalists to produce A las 7PM, periodismo investigativo con voz propia, a programme broadcast on multiple platforms, including radio stations. Vásquez frequently covered sensitive topics, such as irregularities in public contracts, the operations of public hospitals, and the implementation of the School Feeding Program (Programa de Alimentación Escolar, PAE).

== Murder ==
On 14 April 2024, Vásquez was shot and killed inside a local store in Cúcuta. Security footage showed the attack being carried out by two assailants who fled the scene on a motorbike. Despite receiving protection from the National Protection Unit (UNP), Vásquez was unaccompanied at the time of his death. His murder occurred during a violent weekend in the region, with eight additional homicides reported.

=== Investigation and Prosecution ===
Authorities launched an investigation into the murder, citing Vásquez’s journalistic work as a likely motive. Alejandro José Arias, alias "El Cojo," was arrested shortly after the murder and charged with aggravated homicide, illegal possession of weapons, and conspiracy. Further investigations revealed the involvement of the AK-47 criminal gang, affiliated with the Tren de Aragua organisation.

On 8 December 2024, Gustavo Alexander Corredor Torres, alias "El Enano," the former leader of the AK-47 gang, was sentenced to 28 years in prison after admitting to organising the murder. Corredor Torres coordinated surveillance of Vásquez and arranged payments to those involved in the crime. Linda Yesbel Araque, alias "Yoqui," who allegedly drove the getaway motorbike, and another gang member, alias "Puré" or "El Cojo," identified as the gunman, were also prosecuted.

== Impact ==
Vásquez’s murder highlighted the dangers faced by journalists in Colombia, particularly in Norte de Santander, a region where criminal organisations frequently target reporters. His death prompted widespread condemnation, including from UNESCO Director-General Audrey Azoulay, who called for accountability and condemned impunity for crimes against journalists.

The murder had a chilling effect on local journalism, with many reporters abandoning investigative work due to fear of violence and inadequate protection.

== Legacy ==
Vásquez is remembered for his commitment to uncovering corruption and holding public officials accountable. His work has been cited as an example of courageous journalism in a challenging environment. The case also reignited discussions about the safety of journalists in Colombia, leading to renewed calls for stronger protections and accountability for crimes against members of the press.
