= Juan Pablo Rodríguez Barragán =

Colombian Army general

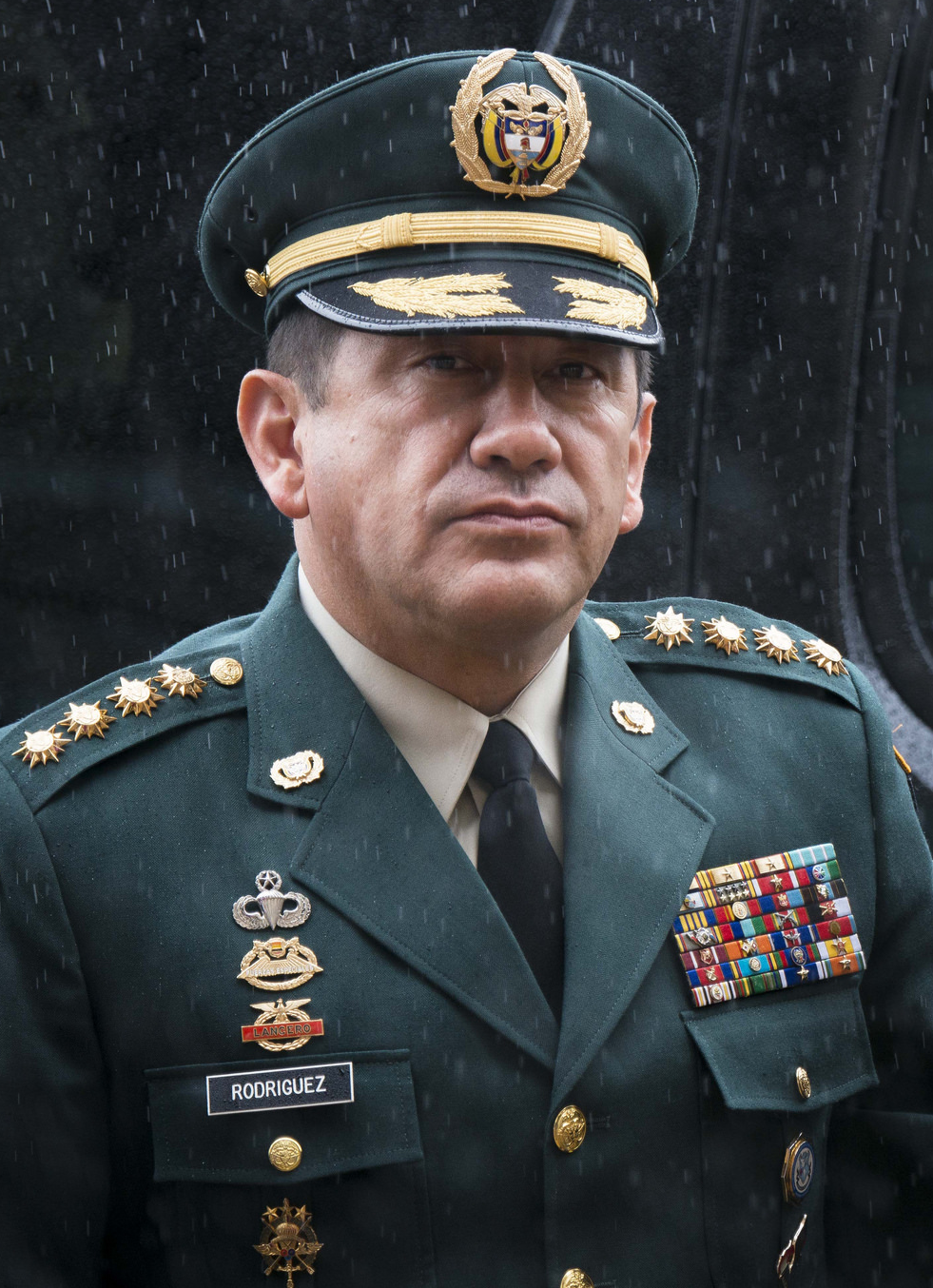
- General Juan Pablo Rodríguez Barragán

Commandant of Colombian Armed Forces
- In office 18 February 2014 – 2017
- President: Juan Manuel Santos
- Preceded by: Leonardo Barrero

Personal details
- Born: 8 February 1959 (age 67) Cundinamarca, Colombia
- Spouse: Elsa Patricia Calderón Carmona
- Children: 2
- Education: Escuela Militar de Ingenieros

Military service
- Allegiance: Colombia
- Branch/service: National Army of Colombia
- Years of service: 1977-present
- Rank: General
- Battles/wars: Colombian Internal Conflict; War on drugs

Juan Pablo Rodríguez Barragán (born December 22, 1956) is a Colombian Army General. Barragán served as the Commander General of the Colombian Armed Forces. Previously, Rodríguez Barragán was the Chief Army General and commander of the 5th Army Division. As of 2018 he serves the ambassador to South Korea.
