= José María Córdova Military School =

Colombian army military academy

Escuela Militar de Cadetes General José María Córdova
- Motto: Patria, Honor, Lealtad - ("Homeland, Honor, Loyalty")
- Type: Military college
- Established: 1907
- Affiliations: National Army of Colombia
- Director: Brigadier General Giovanny Valencia Hurtado
- Location: Bogotá, Colombia
- Colours: Green, Blue, and Red
- Nickname: ESMIC
- Website: http://www.esmic.edu.co/esmic

The Escuela Militar de Cadetes General José María Córdova (English: Colombian Army Military Academy "General José María Córdova", ESMIC) is a 4-year military academy in charge of the formation of the future combatant officers of the Colombian National Army. It is also an institution of higher education, where the cadets in training carry out undergraduate studies in various disciplines. It is located on Calle 80 Suba Avenue, in the north-west of the city of Bogotá.

It was established on 1 June 1907 by decree 434 which was signed by President Rafael Reyes. In 1979 the school was named after José María Córdova a famous general during the Colombian Independence War and also known as the hero of Ayacucho.

== History ==
=== Origins ===
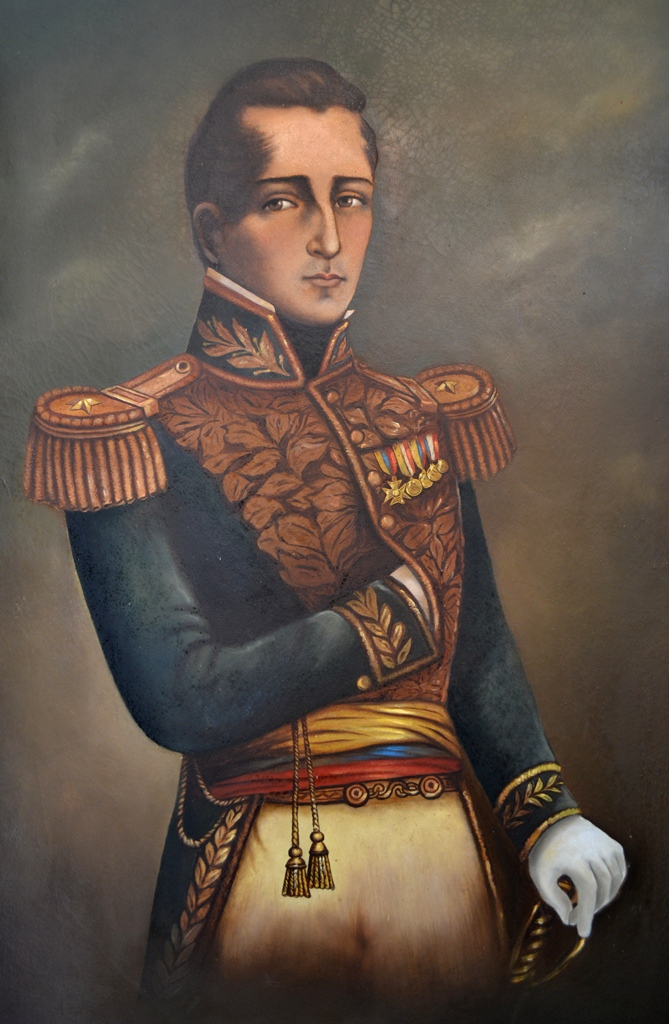
General José María Córdova

The origins of the school date back to the military academies founded after the Colombian independence war, but due to the political instability, financial troubles, and civil wars that characterized Colombia during the mid to late 19th century a national military academy would not be founded until the early 20th century. During this time the Colombian Army officers were not well-trained technically skilled, the need to professionalize and retrain the army prompted the creation of a military school, which was created in 1887 with the government hiring a French military mission to help with the creation of the school. This would not succeed as another civil war The Thousand Days War broke out.

=== Creation ===
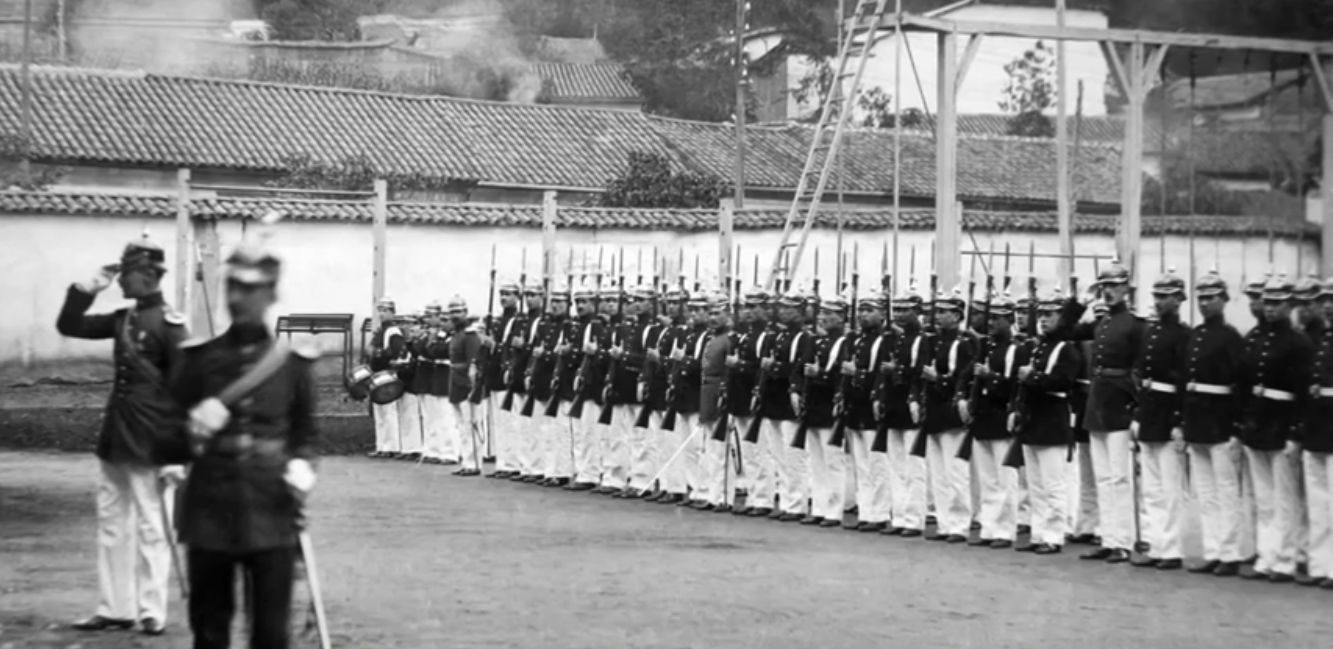
Colombian Cadets in 1910, the Prussian influence that was brought by the Chilean military mission can be noticed

Only in the 20th century would the plans for a military academy be fulfilled, thanks to a Chilean military mission sent in the 1900s to train the army.

On 1 June 1907, the Military School of Colombia was established under the presidency of Rafael Reyes and it was under the direction of the Chilean army Captains Arturo Ahumada Bascuñán in the position of superintendent and Diego Guillén Santana as dean. The institution's campus was located in the western side of the Ayacucho Square, at the old convent of San Agustín. It was created to address the necessity to form academically and militarily the future officers that would integrate the Colombian National Army. The school's first faculty was composed of Chilean army officers and NCOs, the basis of the current Prussian military influence in the academy.

At the end of 1942, the School moved from San Diego to Rionegro to begin the school year in January 1943 in the new "citadel" built on 43 hectares brought by the Army during the presidency of Doctor Eduardo Santos. In 1963 university studies began, with the Faculties of Economy, Engineering and International Law and Diplomacy established, and the school began granting degrees to the commissioned officers graduating. On July 25, 1976, the New Granada Military University was born in the facilities of the School with 210 students, with Brigadier General Gustavo Matamoros D'Costa being its first Rector. Three years later and by decree No. 2537 of October 17, 1979, the Military Cadets School was given the honorific title General José María Córdova in honor of the 150th anniversary of his death and the 155th of the great victory of Ayacucho.

=== Modern Day ===
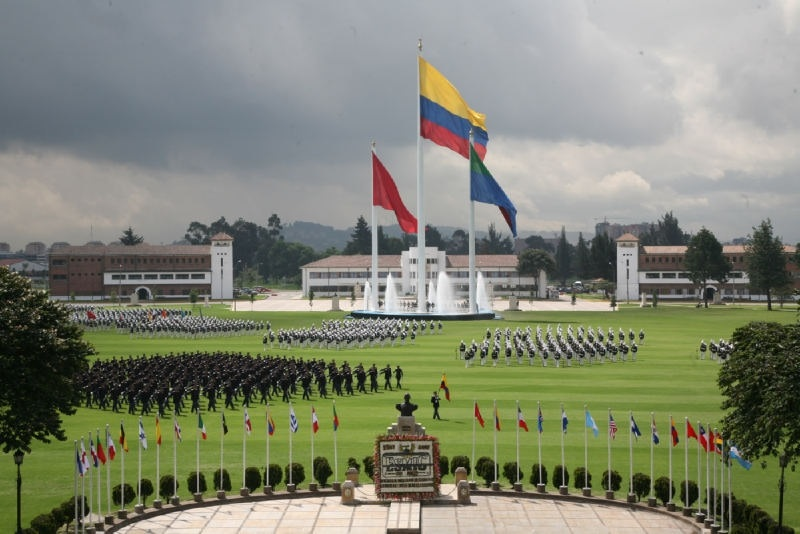
The military academy during a graduation ceremony

In 1996, a new academic phase was restarted through the programming and consolidation of the professional career in Military Sciences, as well as the registration with ICFES of the courses of Business Administration, Law, Civil Engineering and Physical Education, through an agreement for culmination and validation Of the complementary studies with the Military University of Nueva Granada. In 1997 the Mayor's Office of Bogotá, through decree 215 of March 31, declares the facilities as Architectural conservation property. It was subsequently declared of cultural interest through resolution 752 of July 30, 1998 of the Ministry of Culture.

In 2009, 102 years after its founding, the alma mater of the National Army incorporated for the first time in its ranks female personnel, to form as weapons officers in the specialties of intelligence, logistics and engineering. The Military School of Cadets received the High Quality Accreditation in the programs of Military Sciences, Military Physical Education and Logistics Administration in the years 2010, 2012 and 2013 respectively.

In 2023, the school officially opened an officer candidate wing for veteran NCOs and enlisted personnel of the Army.

== Curriculum and academic programs ==
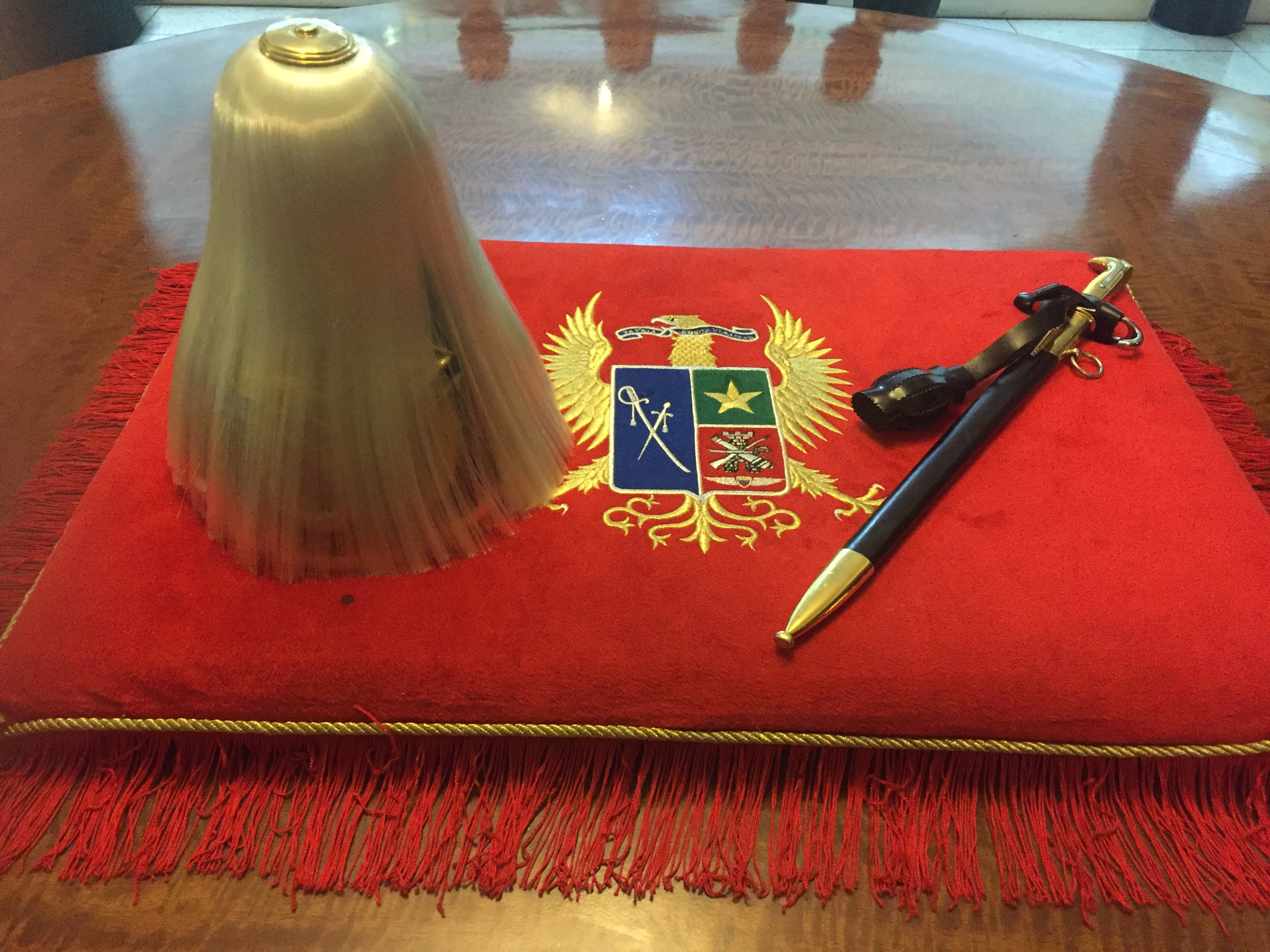
The three main symbols of the school, A Pickelhaube with a white plume used for parades, the coat of arms of the school, and the dagger which cadets receive upon 2 months of entering the school.

Just like so many military academies in the world, the JMC-MS is a medium-sized, highly residential baccalaureate college, with a full-time, four-year undergraduate program that emphasizes instruction in the arts, sciences, and professions with a graduate program, preparing men and women to take on the challenge of being officers of the National Army of Colombia. The academy is accredited by the Ministry of National Education.

It also trains men and women to become future civil engineers in charge of helping the national economy.

=== Undergraduate program - academic ===
The academic program consists of a structured core of subjects depending on the cadet's chosen specialty as a future Army officer, balanced between the arts and sciences. Regardless of major, all cadets graduate with a Bachelor of Science degree.

=== Undergraduate program - military ===
As all cadets are commissioned as second lieutenants upon graduation, military and leadership education is nested with academic instruction. Military training and discipline fall under the purview of the Office of the Commandant of Cadets. Entering freshmen, or 4th class cadets, are referred to as New Cadets, and enter the academy on Reception Day (in January) to start off their military service training as future officers and are recognized as full cadets in a ceremony in August, when the new cadets make their pledge to the school's National Colour. The 2nd, 3rd and 4th years of study, aside from the usual academic work, also involve specialty training in the combat arms of the Army in their respective combat training schools. Selected cadets are also selected for foreign exchange studies in the military academies of Chile, Argentina, the United States, Mexico and Brazil.

The School also has links with military academies in Latin America and thus also has a sizable number of foreign exchange cadets who graduate as Second Lieutenants and with a bachelor's degree and thus return to their countries of origin to serve in their ground forces.

Upon becoming 1st Class cadets only then could a cadet, now appointed a Cadet 3rd Lieutenant, prepare for his/her commissioning in the Army in his/her chosen speciality arm within the service.

== Organization ==
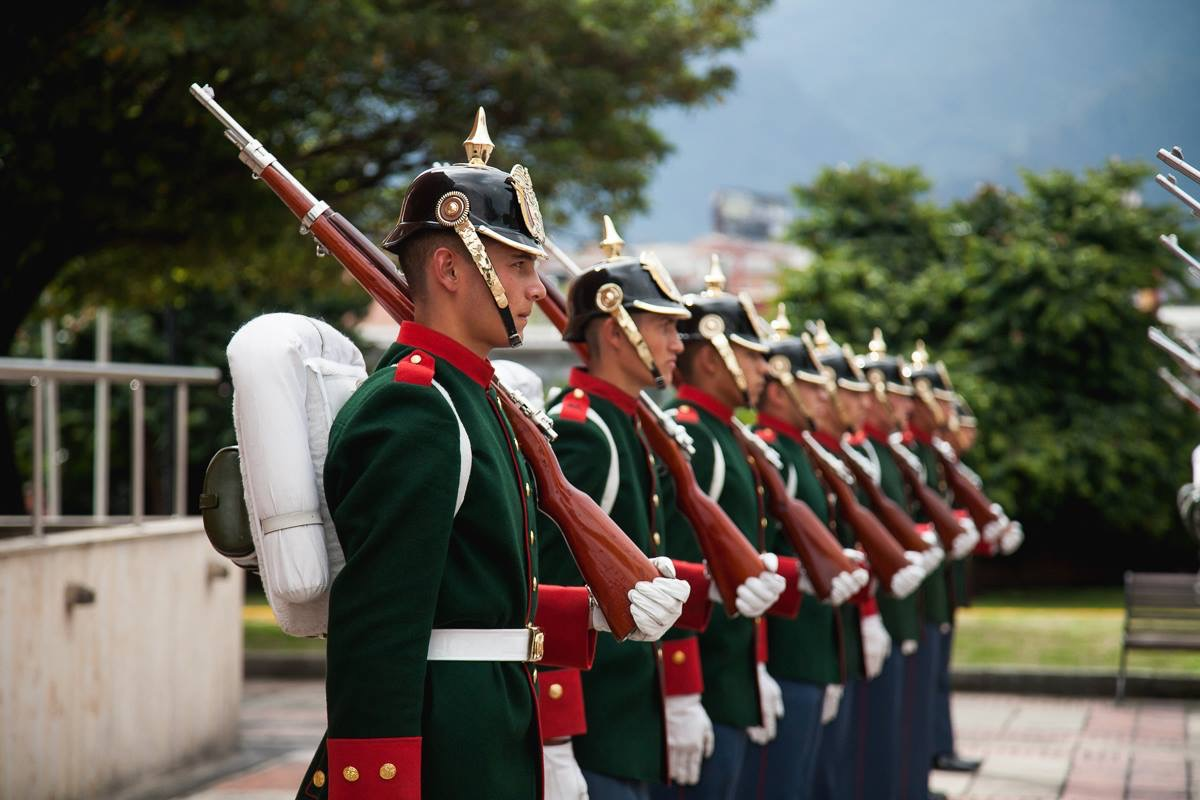
The school's Honor Guard which is in charge of honoring and presenting arms to the President of the Republic or to high-ranking officers, as well as to the Commander-in-Chief of the Military Forces.

The Military Academy is made up of the following units:

- Command and Staff Group
- 1st to 4th Cadet Battalions
- 19th Services Battalion
- Officer Candidates Battalion

== Collegiate Hymn and March ==
=== Hymn of the José María Córdova Military School ===
The Hymn of the José María Córdova Military School was written by Colonel Pedro Pablo Galindo M. and the music was composed by Captain Julio Reina Paez.

=== Lyrics ===
==== Spanish ====
Chorus

A Colombia la patria querida tan hermosa cual Dios la formó, Consagremos con alma aguerrida, (repeat) vida, sangre, dicha, y amor.

I
Ser cadete es magínfico nombre que demanda luchar y vencer, libremente se escogelo el hombre que en su orgulllo no supo temer.(repeat)
II
