= Tibú =

- Municipality and town

- Flag Coat of arms

- Location of the municipality and town of Tibú in the Norte de Santander Department of Colombia.
- Coordinates: 8°38′0″N 72°43′0″W
- Country: Colombia
- Department: Norte de Santander Department
- Foundation: November 3, 1977

Government
  - Mayor: Nelson Leal López

Area
  - Municipality and town: 2,680 km^{2} (1,030 sq mi)
  - Urban: 3.21 km^{2} (1.24 sq mi)
- Elevation: 75 m (246 ft)

Population (2018 census)
  - Municipality and town: 53,586
  - Density: 20.0/km^{2} (51.8/sq mi)
  - Urban: 19,627
  - Urban density: 6,110/km^{2} (15,800/sq mi)
- Time zone: UTC-5 (Colombia Standard Time)

Tibú is a municipality and town of Colombia located in the department of Norte de Santander, in the northeast of the country, on the border with Venezuela and on the banks of the Tibú River. It is the 160th most populated town of Colombia, and the 6th in the department after Cúcuta, Ocaña, Villa del Rosario, Los Patios and Pamplona. It has an airport, and is connected by national road with Cúcuta, Ocaña and El Tarra.

== History ==
The area of present-day Tibú was originally inhabited by the Barí people. Oil companies established a camp when they first arrived in the area in 1945. On March 8, 1945, the Council of Cúcuta approved the creation of the corregimiento of Tibu. The Catholic Church also established the San Luis Beltran Mission and later on May 25, 1952, established the parish. The church greatly contributed to the development of the village by designing the first streets and distributing lots for the first houses and the cathedral.

It was founded as a municipality later on January 1, 1977, in the midst of the jungle of the Catatumbo Region, an almost inhospitable land between Colombia and Venezuela.

The town and municipalities were severely hit by the Colombian Civil War (1960s–present). The area has been a constant dispute between government forces, the guerrillas of the FARC and ELN and paramilitary groups. On June 16, 1996 AUC members perpetrated the Gabarra Massacre while struggling for control of the area with insurgents.

== Geography ==
The municipality of Tibú borders to the east with the Bolivarian Republic of Venezuela, to the south with the municipalities of Cúcuta and Sardinata, to the west with El Tarra and San Calixto and to the northwest with Teorama.

== Climate ==
Climate data for Tibú, elevation 50 m (160 ft), (1981–2010)
Month	Jan	Feb	Mar	Apr	May	Jun	Jul	Aug	Sep	Oct	Nov	Dec	Year
Mean daily maximum °C (°F)	31.7 (89.1)	32.4 (90.3)	32.7 (90.9)	32.9 (91.2)	33.1 (91.6)	33.4 (92.1)	33.7 (92.7)	34.0 (93.2)	33.5 (92.3)	32.9 (91.2)	32.1 (89.8)	31.6 (88.9)	32.9 (91.2)
Daily mean °C (°F)	26.4 (79.5)	27.1 (80.8)	27.6 (81.7)	27.8 (82.0)	28.0 (82.4)	27.9 (82.2)	27.8 (82.0)	28.1 (82.6)	27.8 (82.0)	27.4 (81.3)	27.0 (80.6)	26.5 (79.7)	27.4 (81.3)
Mean daily minimum °C (°F)	21.7 (71.1)	22.1 (71.8)	22.7 (72.9)	23.4 (74.1)	23.4 (74.1)	23.1 (73.6)	22.6 (72.7)	22.8 (73.0)	22.6 (72.7)	22.7 (72.9)	22.7 (72.9)	22.5 (72.5)	22.7 (72.9)
Average precipitation mm (inches)	88.4 (3.48)	106.6 (4.20)	154.5 (6.08)	306.9 (12.08)	309.5 (12.19)	179.6 (7.07)	204.4 (8.05)	253.7 (9.99)	290.9 (11.45)	352.0 (13.86)	352.7 (13.89)	207.7 (8.18)	2,806.8 (110.50)
Average precipitation days	8	8	10	17	16	13	14	16	17	18	16	14	163
Average relative humidity (%)	83	81	80	83	83	83	82	80	83	84	86	87	83
Mean monthly sunshine hours	155.0	135.5	120.9	120.0	158.1	177.0	201.5	210.8	180.0	167.4	144.0	133.3	1,903.5
Mean daily sunshine hours	5.0	4.8	3.9	4.0	5.1	5.9	6.5	6.8	6.0	5.4	4.8	4.3	5.2
Source: Instituto de Hidrologia Meteorologia y Estudios Ambientales

Climate data for Tibú (Petrolea), elevation 62 m (203 ft), (1981–2010)
Month	Jan	Feb	Mar	Apr	May	Jun	Jul	Aug	Sep	Oct	Nov	Dec	Year
Mean daily maximum °C (°F)	32.6 (90.7)	32.4 (90.3)	32.8 (91.0)	33.0 (91.4)	33.1 (91.6)	33.7 (92.7)	33.2 (91.8)	33.7 (92.7)	33.4 (92.1)	32.9 (91.2)	32.8 (91.0)	32.2 (90.0)	33.1 (91.6)
Daily mean °C (°F)	27.8 (82.0)	28.0 (82.4)	28.1 (82.6)	28.2 (82.8)	28.5 (83.3)	28.6 (83.5)	28.3 (82.9)	28.4 (83.1)	28.6 (83.5)	28.5 (83.3)	28.3 (82.9)	27.9 (82.2)	28.3 (82.9)
Mean daily minimum °C (°F)	20.7 (69.3)	20.9 (69.6)	21.4 (70.5)	21.4 (70.5)	21.4 (70.5)	21.1 (70.0)	21.0 (69.8)	21.1 (70.0)	21.0 (69.8)	21.1 (70.0)	21.1 (70.0)	20.8 (69.4)	21.1 (70.0)
Average precipitation mm (inches)	91.5 (3.60)	85.9 (3.38)	149.8 (5.90)	315.4 (12.42)	275.8 (10.86)	175.4 (6.91)	206.4 (8.13)	224.1 (8.82)	272.2 (10.72)	341.7 (13.45)	294.4 (11.59)	202.5 (7.97)	2,614.4 (102.93)
Average precipitation days	7	6	8	14	11	9	10	12	14	16	15	11	126
Average relative humidity (%)	84	83	84	84	85	85	83	84	84	83	84	86	84
Source: Instituto de Hidrologia Meteorologia y Estudios Ambientales
