= El Tarra =

Coordinates: 8.0475°N 73.0836°W

- Municipality and town
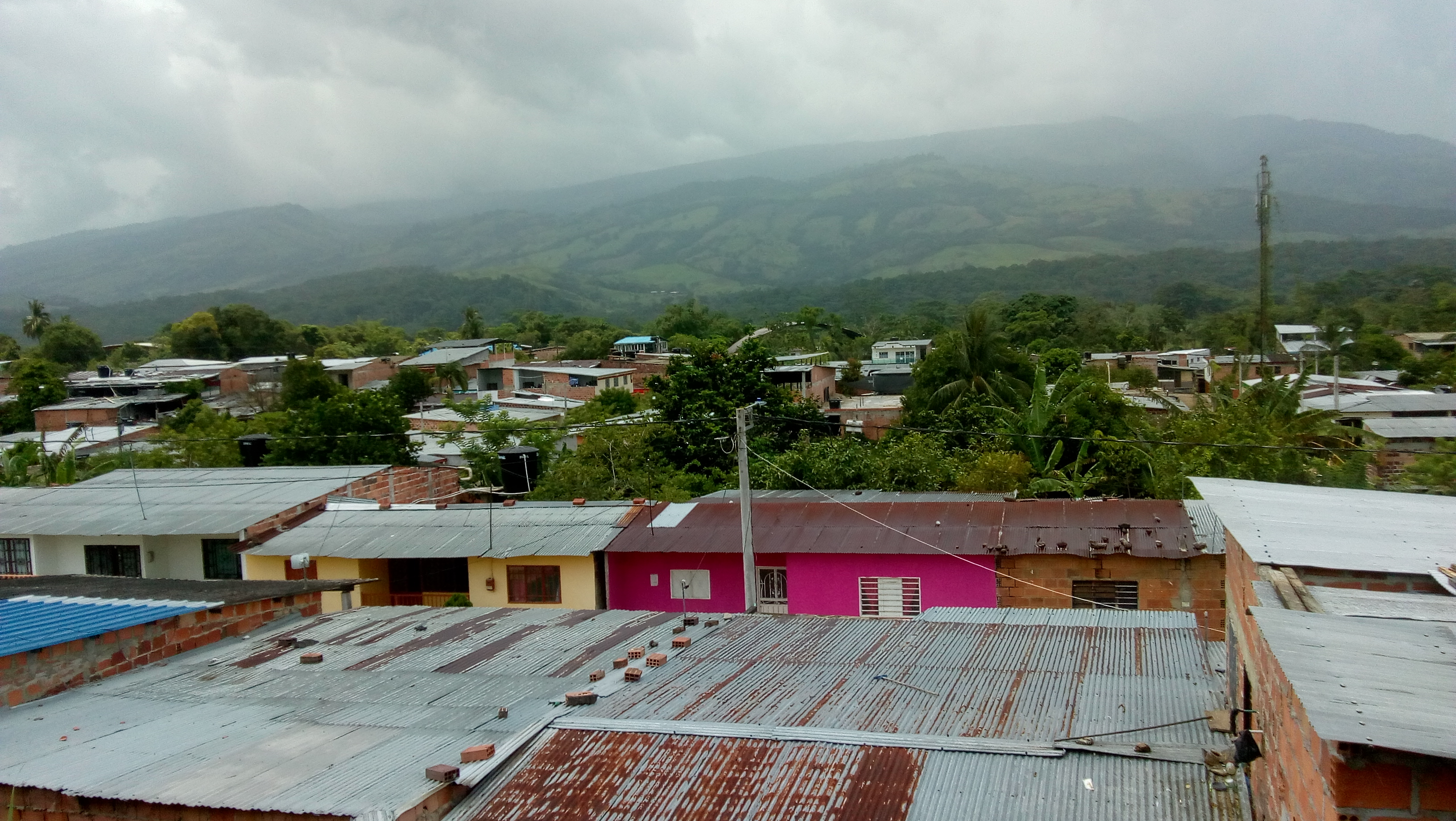

- Flag

- Location of the municipality and town of El Tarra in the Norte de Santander Department of Colombia.
- Country: Colombia
- Department: Norte de Santander Department

Area
  - Total: 687 km^{2} (265 sq mi)
- Elevation: 160 m (520 ft)

Population (2015)
  - Total: 10,957
  - Density: 15.9/km^{2} (41.3/sq mi)
- Time zone: UTC-5 (Colombia Standard Time)

El Tarra is a Colombian municipality and town located in the department of Norte de Santander.

== Climate ==
Climate data for El Tarra (Tarra El), elevation 180 m (590 ft), (1981–2010)
| Month | Jan | Feb | Mar | Apr | May | Jun | Jul | Aug | Sep | Oct | Nov | Dec | Year |
|---|---|---|---|---|---|---|---|---|---|---|---|---|---|
| Mean daily maximum °C (°F) | 31.7 (89.1) | 31.7 (89.1) | 31.8 (89.2) | 32.0 (89.6) | 32.2 (90.0) | 32.3 (90.1) | 32.5 (90.5) | 32.4 (90.3) | 32.5 (90.5) | 32.4 (90.3) | 31.8 (89.2) | 31.7 (89.1) | 32.1 (89.8) |
| Daily mean °C (°F) | 26.8 (80.2) | 27.0 (80.6) | 26.6 (79.9) | 27.2 (81.0) | 27.5 (81.5) | 27.5 (81.5) | 27.5 (81.5) | 27.5 (81.5) | 27.5 (81.5) | 27.4 (81.3) | 26.8 (80.2) | 26.7 (80.1) | 27.2 (81.0) |
| Mean daily minimum °C (°F) | 20.1 (68.2) | 20.4 (68.7) | 20.7 (69.3) | 21.1 (70.0) | 21.2 (70.2) | 20.8 (69.4) | 20.7 (69.3) | 20.7 (69.3) | 20.7 (69.3) | 20.7 (69.3) | 20.5 (68.9) | 20.4 (68.7) | 20.7 (69.3) |
| Average precipitation mm (inches) | 85.9 (3.38) | 84.7 (3.33) | 123.4 (4.86) | 179.1 (7.05) | 181.0 (7.13) | 194.1 (7.64) | 211.3 (8.32) | 233.5 (9.19) | 288.9 (11.37) | 314.2 (12.37) | 361.4 (14.23) | 295.6 (11.64) | 2,355.1 (92.72) |
| Average precipitation days | 6 | 6 | 9 | 13 | 12 | 12 | 14 | 15 | 16 | 18 | 17 | 15 | 141 |
| Average relative humidity (%) | 82 | 80 | 81 | 80 | 80 | 80 | 79 | 79 | 79 | 79 | 81 | 81 | 80 |
Source: Instituto de Hidrologia Meteorologia y Estudios Ambientales
