= Fidel Sánchez Hernández =

President of El Salvador from 1967 to 1972

General Fidel Sánchez Hernández
- Sánchez Hernández, c. 1967–1972

32nd President of El Salvador
- In office 1 July 1967 – 1 July 1972
- Vice President: Humberto Guillermo Cuestas
- Preceded by: Julio Adalberto Rivera
- Succeeded by: Arturo Armando Molina

Minister of the Interior of El Salvador
- In office 1 July 1962 – 30 June 1966
- President: Julio Adalberto Rivera
- Preceded by: Ruy César Miranda
- Succeeded by: Francisco Armando Arias

Personal details
- Born: 7 July 1917 El Divisadero, El Salvador
- Died: 28 February 2003 (aged 85) San Salvador, El Salvador
- Party: National Conciliation Party
- Spouse: Marina Uriarte
- Children: 4
- Occupation: Military officer, military attaché, politician

Military service
- Allegiance: El Salvador
- Branch/service: Salvadoran Army
- Years of service: 1938–?
- Rank: General
- Battles/wars: Football War; 1972 Salvadoran coup attempt

Fidel Sánchez Hernández (7 July 1917 – 28 February 2003) was a Salvadoran military officer, military attaché, and politician who served as President of El Salvador from 1967 to 1972 as a member of the National Conciliation Party.

Born in El Divisadero, Sánchez Hernández joined the Salvadoran Army in 1938. He served as a military attaché for the Armed Forces of El Salvador at various points during the 1950s and 1960s. He served as Minister of the Interior during the presidency of Lieutenant Colonel Julio Adalberto Rivera from 1962 to 1966. He won the 1967 presidential election with 54 percent of the vote and became president on 1 July 1967. Sánchez Hernández led El Salvador during the four-day Football War against Honduras in 1969 that resulted in an Organization of American States-mediated ceasefire. During his presidency, he implemented education and land reforms.

After Colonel Arturo Armando Molina won the rigged 1972 presidential election, reformists in the military attempted a coup to install opposition leader José Napoleón Duarte as president and arrested Sánchez Hernández. The coup failed and Sánchez Hernández was succeeded by Molina on 1 July 1972. Sánchez Hernández died in San Salvador in 2003.

== Early life ==
Fidel Sánchez Hernández was born on 7 July 1917 in El Divisadero, El Salvador. His mother was Teresa Hernández Echeverría; his father, Vicente Sánchez Estrada, died before his birth. Sánchez Hernández married Marina Teresa and the couple had four children. He had a brother named Vicente, who later served as the director of the National Administration of Telecommunications (ANTEL) during Sánchez Hernández's presidency.

== Military career ==
Sánchez Hernández became a sub-lieutenant in the Salvadoran Army on 28 January 1938. He was promoted to lieutenant on 11 July 1941 and to captain on 10 March 1945. That year, Sánchez Hernández enrolled in the Captains School and later attended the United States Army Armor School at Fort Knox. After returning to El Salvador, Sánchez Hernández served as a military attaché to the United Nations Command during the Korean War.

Sánchez Hernández was promoted to major captain on 9 February 1951. He attended the General Staff School in Spain from 1951 to 1954 and then served as a military attaché to the United States embassy in Paris, France. When he returned to El Salvador, he was promoted to lieutenant colonel on 14 December 1955 and became the inspector general of the Armed Forces of El Salvador. From 1958 to 1960, Sánchez Hernández was simultaneously the military commander of the San Miguel Department and the commander of the 13th Infantry Regiment.

In 1960, Sánchez Hernández became a military attaché to the Salvadoran embassy in Washington, D.C., United States. He was promoted to colonel on 10 October 1961. On 1 July 1962, Lieutenant Colonel Julio Adalberto Rivera, the president of El Salvador, appointed Sánchez Hernández as Minister of the Interior. In 1964, the Legislative Assembly elected Sánchez Hernández to serve as the second presidential designate (third in line to the presidency), serving until 1966.

On 30 June 1966, Sánchez Hernández resigned from his ministerial position to run for president in the 1967 presidential election. He secured the nomination of the military-backed National Conciliation Party (PCN) on 24 October with Rivera's endorsement and formally registered his candidacy on 19 November. Humberto Guillermo Cuestas was Sánchez Hernández's running mate. On 5 March 1967, Sánchez Hernández won 267,447 votes accounting for 54.4 percent of the vote and defeated three other candidates: the Christian Democratic Party's (PDC) Abraham Rodríguez Portillo, the Renovating Action Party's (PAR) Fabio Castillo Figueroa, and the Salvadoran Popular Party's (PPS) Álvaro Magaña.

== Presidency ==
Sánchez Hernández became President of El Salvador on 1 July 1967. He appointed a cabinet consisting of Alfredo Martínez Moreno as Minister of Foreign Affairs; Francisco Armando Arias as Minister of the Interior; Marcos Gabriel Villacorta as Minister of Justice; Cuestas as Minister of Finance; Rafael Glower Valdivieso as Minister of the Economy; Walter Béneke as Minister of Education; Colonel Fidel Torres as Minister of National Defense; Colonel Joaquín Zaldívar as Minister of Labor and Social Security; Antonio Berrios Mendoza as Minister of Agriculture and Livestock; Tomás Palomo Alcaine as Minister of Health and Welfare; and Enrique Cuellar as Minister of Public Works.

=== Football War ===
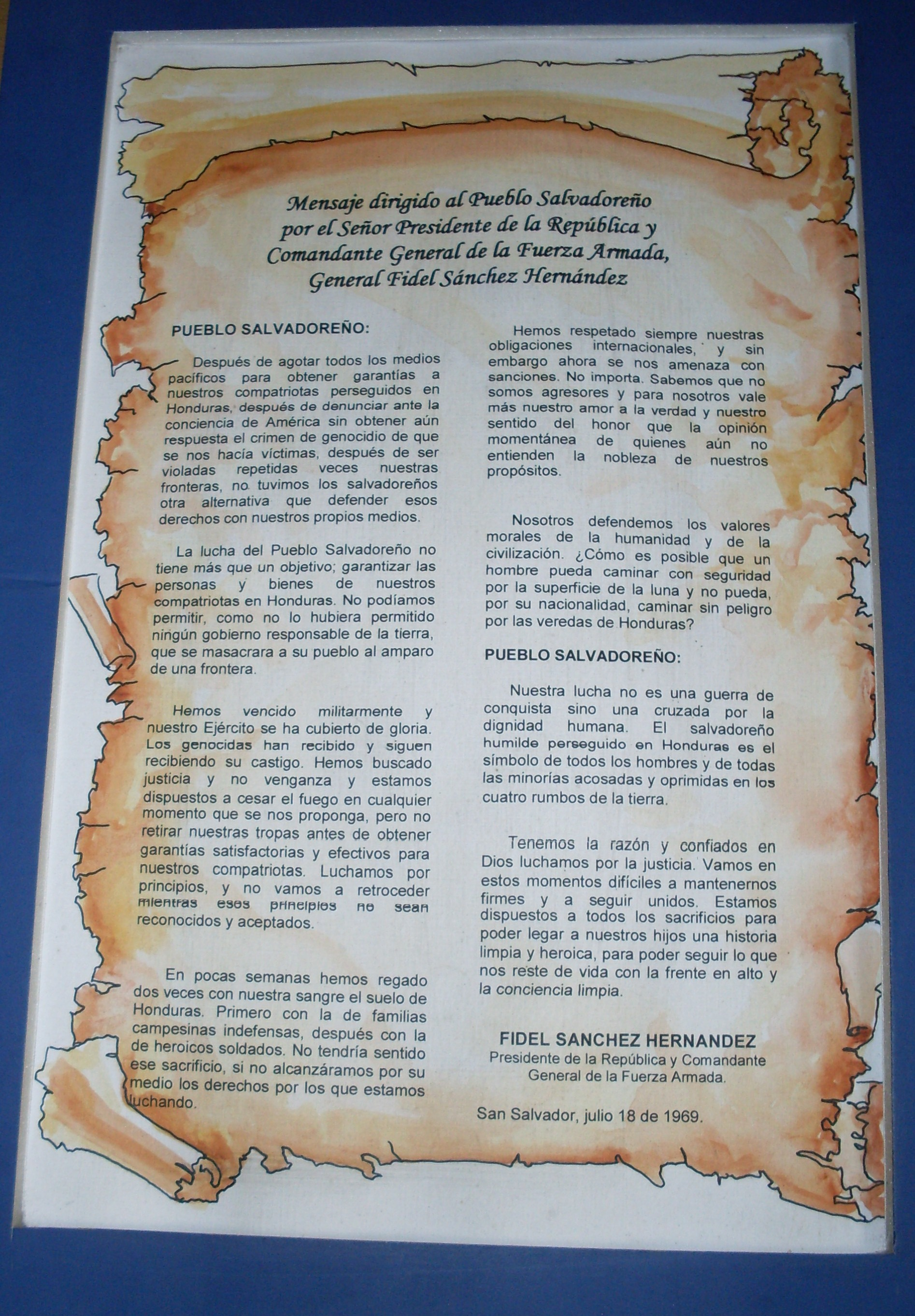
The message issued by Sánchez Hernández to the Salvadoran people at the end of the Football War in 1969

On 7 May 1969, Sánchez Hernández was promoted to the rank of general. During 1969, diplomatic tensions between El Salvador and Honduras grew due to the Honduran government's implementation of agrarian reforms that targeted Salvadoran laborers in that country. Tens of thousands of Salvadorans began to flee Honduras due to violence against them, and association football matches between both countries during qualifications to the 1970 FIFA World Cup intensified tensions. Since the refugees were placing a burden on Salvadoran social services, Sánchez Hernández sought to rally political support behind him and created the National Unity Front (FUN) that united all Salvadoran political parties against a supposed "genocide" of Salvadorans in Honduras. Sánchez Hernández ordered the invasion of Honduras on 14 July 1969, and he personally commanded Salvadoran forces during the war from the war zone. The four-day war ended following an Organization of American States-mediated ceasefire and resulted in 2,000 deaths, most of whom were civilians. While Sánchez Hernández claimed victory, the war was militarily indecisive.

The National Unity Front eventually fractured. The PDC left the coalition in October 1969 and began calling for the implementation of land reform to gain popular support. In 1970, the Farabundo Martí Popular Liberation Forces (FPL) leftist paramilitary led by Cayetano Carpio split from the Communist Party of El Salvador (PCES) led by Schafik Hándal due to the party's membership in the National Unity Front.

=== State repression ===
Shortly after assuming office, Sánchez Hernández appointed Colonel José Alberto Medrano as the director of the National Guard. Sánchez Hernández and Medrano expanded the Nationalist Democratic Organization (ORDEN), a paramilitary organization that patrolled rural areas and functioned as a network of informants for the Salvadoran government. The group expanded to up to 100,000 members by 1970. Sánchez Hernández styled himself as the "supreme chief" of ORDEN.

In addition to providing surveillance for the Salvadoran government, ORDEN also served the interests of El Salvador's wealthy landowners and combatted communist activity. During Sánchez Hernández's presidency, ORDEN cooperated with the Salvadoran Army and the National Guard to enforce state security and conduct intelligence gathering. ORDEN also engaged in the repression of workers' strikes, and some elements operated as death squads.

In January 1970, Sánchez Hernández removed Medrano from power and forced him into retirement as he had become popular for his service during the Football War. According to political scientist James Dunkerley, Sánchez Hernández removed Medrano after discovering that Medrano was organizing a coup due to opposition to Sánchez Hernández's land reform policies. After Medrano's removal, Sánchez Hernández ended government support for ORDEN but the group continued to operate independently. Sánchez Hernández blamed the 1971 kidnapping and murder of industrialist Ernesto Regalado Dueñas on The Group, a leftist militia. Many Salvadorans, including some factions in the PCN, believed that Medrano had ordered the killing to place blame on leftist groups, but Medrano was acquitted in court.

=== Social policies ===
During Sánchez Hernández's presidency, up to 30 percent of El Salvador's national budget focused on education. He initiated education reforms during his presidency by expanding the coverage of material in the school curriculum and promoting of student government in secondary schools. He also launched an initiative to build new schools and sports fields every week. He established youth development programs that aimed to provide Salvadoran children with opportunities in art, music, and sports. Educational television also began to air on Salvadoran television stations during his presidency. Béneke led many of Sánchez Hernández's education reforms, who took inspiration from the educational systems in Europe and Japan.

Sánchez Hernández implemented land reform initiatives to help settle Salvadoran refugees from Honduras. He helped pass the Drainage and Irrigation Law that placed limits on how much private property one may own in areas with high irrigation to address wealth inequality. Sánchez Hernández established the Rural Colonization Institute to help Salvadorans who fled from Honduras after the Football War or veterans of the war to establish settlements in rural areas of El Salvador. He also established the Program of Studies on Agrarian Reform. Sánchez Hernández's land reforms were ineffective and largely unsuccessful.

From 5 to 7 July 1968, Sánchez Hernández hosted Costa Rican president José Joaquín Trejos Fernández, Honduran president Oswaldo López Arellano, Guatemalan president Julio César Méndez Montenegro, Nicaraguan president Anastasio Somoza Debayle, and United States president Lyndon B. Johnson in El Salvador. From 25 September to 7 October 1970, Sánchez Hernández made state visits to South Korea, Japan, and Mexico. Cuestas held presidential powers during this time.

The last execution in El Salvador was carried out during Sánchez Hernández's presidency on 8 February 1971. In a televised and public execution, peasant Victoriano Gómez Urrutia was executed for the 1961 murders of a woman and her underage daughter in San Miguel Department.

=== Coup attempt ===
The 1972 presidential election experienced widespread electoral fraud, with electoral officials fabricating a results favoring the PCN's Colonel Arturo Armando Molina, Sánchez Hernández's personal secretary, against the National Opposition Union's (UNO) (Note: The National Opposition Union (UNO) was a political coalition consisting of the Christian Democratic Party (PDC), the National Revolutionary Movement (MRN), and the National Democratic Union (UDN).) José Napoleón Duarte. As neither candidate won an absolute majority, the PCN-controlled Legislative Assembly elected Molina as El Salvador's next president. On 25 March, reformist elements of the armed forces led by Colonel Benjamín Mejía led a coup in opposition of the results and aimed to install Duarte as president. Sánchez Hernández and his family were arrested during the coup, but the coup eventually failed when loyalist factions of the military regained control of San Salvador. Duarte was exiled to Venezuela after the coup. Mejía was also exiled. Sánchez Hernández left office on 1 July 1972, being succeeded by Molina.

== Post-presidency ==
Sánchez Hernández retired from politics after his presidency, but he did endorse General Carlos Humberto Romero's presidential candidacy during the 1977 presidential election against UNO's Colonel Ernesto Claramount. Sánchez Hernández lived on a ranch that raised livestock east of San Salvador.

=== Death ===
Sánchez Hernández died on 28 February 2003 of a heart attack at the Military Hospital in San Salvador, El Salvador, aged 85. He was buried on 2 March in the General Cemetery of San Salvador.

== Orders and decorations ==
The following is a list of orders and decorations awarded to Sánchez Hernández:

China (Republic of)

- Grand Cordon of the Order of the Cloud and Banner (14 February 1968)

Dominican Republic

- Order of Merit of Duarte, Sánchez and Mella (13 November 1970)

Guatemala

- Order of the Quetzal (3 September 1968)

Mexico

- Collar of the Order of the Aztec Eagle (16 January 1958)

South Korea

- Grand Order of Mugunghwa (22 September 1970)
- Grand National Order (4 March 1969)

West Germany

- Grand Cross of the Order of Merit of the Federal Republic of Germany (11 August 1971)

== Dates of ranks ==
The following is a list of Sánchez Hernández's military ranks during his career.

Insignia	Rank	Service branch	Date of promotion
Sub-lieutenant	Sub-lieutenant	Army	28 January 1938
Lieutenant	Lieutenant	Army	11 July 1941
Captain	Captain	Army	10 March 1945
Major captain	Major captain	Army	9 February 1951
Lieutenant colonel	Lieutenant colonel	Army	14 December 1955
Colonel	Colonel	Army	10 October 1961
General	General	Army	7 May 1969

== Electoral history ==
Year	Office	Party	Main opponent and party		Votes for Sánchez Hernández				Result	Swing	Ref.
Year	Office	Party	Main opponent and party		Total	%	P.	±%	Result	Swing	Ref.
1967	President of El Salvador	PCN	Abraham Rodríguez Portillo	PDC	267,447	54.37	1st	N/A	Won	Hold	

== See also ==
- List of heads of state and government with a military background

== Notes ==
Political offices
Preceded by Ruy César Miranda	Minister of the Interior; 1962–1966	Succeeded by Francisco Armando Arias
Preceded by Julio Adalberto Rivera	President of El Salvador; 1967–1972	Succeeded by Arturo Armando Molina
