= Victoriano =

Victoriano is both a given name and a surname. It may refer to:

== Given name ==
- Victoriano Balasanz (1854–1929), Spanish painter
- Victoriano Castellanos (1795–1862), Honduran politician and President of Honduras
- Victoriano Crémer (1906–2009), Spanish poet and journalist
- Victoriano G. de Ysasi (1816–1881), Spanish wine merchant and philatelist
- Victoriano Gómez Urrutia (1943–1971), Salvadoran convicted murderer, last prisoner to be executed by El Salvador
- Victoriano Guisasola y Menéndez (1852–1920), Spanish Roman Catholic cardinal
- Victoriano Huerta (1850–1916), Mexican military officer and President of Mexico
- Victoriano Leguizamón (1922–2007), Paraguayan footballer and manager
- Victoriano Lillo Catalán, Argentine writer
- Victoriano Lorenzo (died 1903), Panamanian military officer
- Victoriano Ramírez (died 1929), Mexican military officer
- Victoriano Salado Álvarez (1867–1931), Mexican writer and politician
- Victoriano Sarmientos (born 1956), Cuban volleyball player
- Victoriano Sosa (born 1974), Dominican Republic boxer

== Surname ==
- Angelo Victoriano (born 1968), Angolan basketball player
- Edmar Victoriano (born 1975), Angolan basketball player
- Lucas Victoriano (born 1977), Argentine basketball player
- Ruben Victoriano, also known as Ruvik, main antagonist in The Evil Within

== See also ==
- Don Victoriano, Misamis Occidental, municipality in the Philippines
- Victoriano Arenas, Argentine football club
