= 1967 Salvadoran presidential election =

1967 election in El Salvador

- 5 March 1967
- Registered: 1,266,587
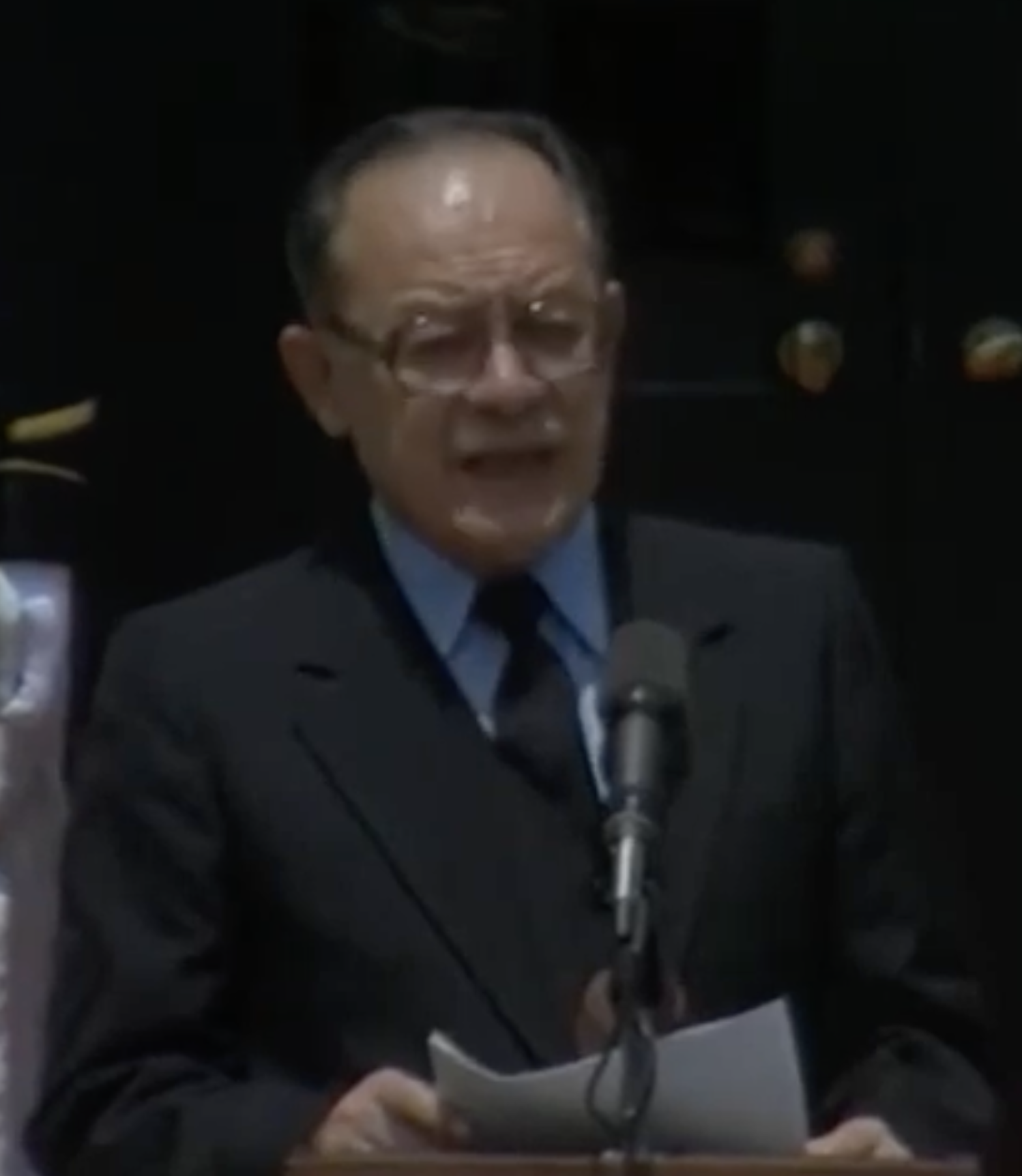
	PCN	PDC
Candidate	Fidel Sánchez Hernández	Abraham Rodríguez Portillo
Party	PCN	PDC
Running mate	Humberto Guillermo Cuestas	Mario Pacheco
Popular vote	267,447	106,358
Percentage	54.37%	21.62%
	PAR
Candidate	Fabio Castillo Figueroa	Álvaro Magaña
Party	Renovating Action	Popular
Running mate	Jesús Gómez Castro	Agustín Alvarenga
Popular vote	70,978	47,111
Percentage	14.43%	9.58%
- Results by department
President before election
Julio Adalberto Rivera
PCN
Elected President
Fidel Sánchez Hernández
PCN

Presidential elections were held in El Salvador on 5 March 1967. Voters elected a president and vice president to serve a five year term from 1967 to 1972. It was the second presidential election held after the 1961 coup d'état that brought the military-backed National Conciliation Party (PCN) to power.

There were four presidential candidates: Colonel Fidel Sánchez Hernández of the PCN, Abraham Rodríguez Portillo of the Christian Democratic Party (PDC), Fabio Castillo Figueroa of the Renovating Action Party (PAR), and Álvaro Magaña of the Salvadoran Popular Party (PPS). Two other parties were eligible to nominate candidates but did not, and three more parties were banned from participation due to alleged communist sympathies. Land reform, communism, and military involvement in politics were major campaign topics prior to the election. Sánchez Hernández won the election with 54.37 percent of the vote.

== Background ==
Since 1931, El Salvador was ruled by military dictatorship, but the government continued to hold elections. In October 1960, the Armed Forces of El Salvador (FAES) overthrew Lieutenant Colonel José María Lemus, the president of El Salvador. FAES established the social democratic Junta of Government, but this junta was itself overthrown in January 1961 by conservative officers who established the Civic-Military Directory. The Civic-Military Directory was led by Colonel Julio Adalberto Rivera and he won the 1962 presidential election unopposed as a member of the National Conciliation Party (PCN).

== Electoral system ==
=== Election procedure ===
All Salvadoran citizens over the age of 18 were eligible to vote with the exception of those who were imprisoned, who were declared mentally incompetent, or who attempted to subvert election integrity. Citizens had to be registered with the Registry of Voters managed by the Central Electoral Council (CEC) to be eligible to vote. There were 1,266,587 registered voters in 1967. Some departments had laws requiring compulsory voting, but these laws were not applied.

=== Political parties ===
Political parties had to be registered with the CEC to be eligible to participate in the election. Political parties that promoted communism, anarchism, or anti-democratic policies were banned from participation. Parties had until 5 November 1966 to be registered with the CEC. Nine parties existed during the 1967 presidential election campaign period; six were able to present presidential candidates, of which, four nominated candidates. The remaining three parties were banned by the government for alleged communist sympathies.

Party		Participated?
PRAM	April and May Revolutionary Party; Partido Revolucionario Abril y Mayo	Banned
PUCA	Central American Unionist Party; Partido Unionista Centro Americano	No
PDC	Christian Democratic Party; Partido Democrática Cristiano	Yes
PCES	Communist Party of El Salvador; Partido Comunista de El Salvador	Banned
PCN	National Conciliation Party; Partido de Concertación Nacional	Yes
PRN	National Reformist Party; Partido Reformador Nacional	Banned
PAR	Renovating Action Party; Partido Acción Renovadora	Yes
PREN	National Evolution Republican Party; Partido Republicano de Evolución Nacional	No
PPS	Salvadoran Popular Party; Partido Popular Salvadoreño	Yes

== Candidates ==
The 1967 presidential election had four presidential candidates. Colonel Fidel Sánchez Hernández, the Minister of the Interior during Rivera's presidency, was the PCN's presidential candidate; Minister of Justice Humberto Guillermo Cuestas was his running-mate. The Christian Democratic Party (PDC) selected former party leader Abraham Rodríguez Portillo and former culture vice minister Mario Pacheco as its presidential and vice presidential candidates. The Renovating Action Party (PAR) chose Fabio Castillo Figueroa, a former member of the Junta of Government, and lawyer Jesús Gómez Castro as its candidates, while the Salvadoran Popular Party (PPS) chose economist Álvaro Magaña and party founder Agustín Alvarenga as its candidates.

Party	Candidate		Running-mate	
Renovating Action Party	Fabio Castillo Figueroa	Fabio Castillo Figueroa; Member of the Junta of Government (1960–1961)	Jesús Gómez Castro	Jesús Gómez Castro
Salvadoran Popular Party	Álvaro Magaña	Álvaro Magaña	Álvaro Magaña	Agustín Alvarenga
Christian Democratic Party	Abraham Rodríguez Portillo	Abraham Rodríguez Portillo	Abraham Rodríguez Portillo	Mario Pacheco; Vice Minister of Culture (late-1950s)
National Conciliation Party	Fidel Sánchez Hernández	Fidel Sánchez Hernández; Minister of the Interior (1962–1966)	Humberto Guillermo Cuestas	Humberto Guillermo Cuestas; Minister of Justice (1963–1966)

== Election campaign ==
During the election campaign, Castillo and PAR faced accusations of holding communist sympathies. Critics also accused the party of having close connections to the Soviet Union, China, and Cuba. Castillo denied these accusations. Some PAR members wanted to extend diplomatic recognition of the Cuban government and forge closer relations with Warsaw Pact members. It also accused the United States of imperialism, straying from the other parties which all favored close relations with the US. Like PAR, the PDC faced accusations of holding communist sympathies, largely made by PCN members. Conversely, PAR accused the PDC of being subservient to the pope. The PDC denied both accusations. The PDC attacked PCN party officials by publishing a list of members who allegedly were involved in radical movements in their early careers. The PPS faced criticism of being a tool of the country's oligarchy.

The PCN was controlled by FAES which received criticism from both the PDC and PAR. The PDC criticized the armed forces' involvement in politics and called for the institution to remain apolitical, while PAR called for a revolution and the complete reorganization of the armed forces. The PDC and PCN both campaign on moderate land reform promises. Meanwhile, PAR campaigned on the implementation of the "1967–1972 Plan of Government", a broader land reform program that would distribute lands owned by 1,799 wealthy landowners (who held half of the country's land) to El Salvador's landless peasants and limit landowners to owning up to 260 acres (110 ha) of land. The PPS had no position on land reform but affirmed its commitment to "respect[ing] and protect[ing] property".

== Results ==
The election was held on 5 March 1967. The election resulted in a victory for Sánchez Hernández who won 267,447 votes (54.37%). Rodríguez finished in second place with 106,358 votes (21.62%), Castillo in third with 70,978 votes (14.43%), and Magaña in fourth with 47,111 votes (9.58%).

Candidate	Running mate	Party	Votes	%
Fidel Sánchez Hernández	Humberto Guillermo Cuestas	National Conciliation Party	267,447	54.37
Abraham Rodríguez Portillo	Mario Pacheco	Christian Democratic Party	106,358	21.62
Fabio Castillo Figueroa	Jesús Gómez Castro	Renovating Action Party	70,978	14.43
Álvaro Magaña	Agustín Alvarenga	Salvadoran Popular Party	47,111	9.58
Total			491,894	100.00
Registered voters/turnout			1,266,587	–
Source: Krennerich 2005, p. 288

=== Results by department ===
The following table displays the number of votes and seats each candidate received from each of the country's 14 departments. The candidate with the most votes in a department is highlighted in its party color and the candidate with the second most votes and seats in a department is in gray.

Department	Sánchez		Rodríguez		Castillo		Magaña		Total
Department	V	%	V	%	V	%	V	%	V
Ahuachapán	14,932	72.17	1,724	8.33	2,096	10.13	1,938	9.37	20,690
Cabañas	9,277	63.32	961	6.56	194	1.32	4,219	28.80	14,651
Chalatenango	10,823	51.34	6,528	30.97	482	2.29	3,247	15.40	21,080
Cuscatlán	9,599	49.25	7,397	37.95	662	3.40	1,834	9.41	19,492
La Libertad	19,911	49.64	13,488	33.63	3,638	9.07	3,072	7.66	40,109
La Paz	10,529	49.27	6,832	31.97	2,024	9.47	1,987	9.30	21,372
La Unión	15,314	69.36	3,106	14.07	886	4.01	2,773	12.56	22,079
Morazán	18,447	80.95	3,245	14.24	266	1.17	829	3.64	22,787
San Miguel	38,561	76.33	5,962	11.80	3,175	6.28	2,822	5.59	50,520
San Salvador	53,802	40.98	32,267	24.58	37,939	28.90	7,273	5.54	131,281
San Vicente	10,201	60.14	4,744	27.97	756	4.46	1,260	7.43	16,961
Santa Ana	24,190	47.18	9,103	17.75	13,078	25.50	4,906	9.57	51,277
Sonsonate	14,665	53.37	6,267	22.81	2,056	7.48	4,490	16.34	27,478
Usulután	17,196	53.54	4,734	14.74	3,726	11.60	6,461	20.12	32,117
Total	267,447	54.37	106,358	21.62	70,978	14.43	47,111	9.58	491,894
Source: Mejía Marroquín 2017, p. 197

== Aftermath ==
Sánchez Hernández was inaugurated on 1 July 1967. During his presidency, Sánchez Hernández implemented education and land reforms, led El Salvador during the 1969 Football War, and repressed workers' strikes with El Salvador's security forces. Although the PCN's Colonel Arturo Armando Molina won the 1972 presidential election, political scientist Michael Krennerich described it as having experienced "massive electoral fraud". Reformist elements in the armed forces attempted a coup against Sánchez Hernández to overturn the results of the election and install the PDC candidate José Napoleón Duarte as president, but the coup failed and Molina was inaugurated on 1 July 1972 when Sánchez Hernández's term expired. The military dictatorship eventually ended following the 1979 coup d'état led by reformists against the PCN government.

== See also ==
- Elections in El Salvador
