= Government Center Tower (San Salvador) =

Government building in El Salvador

Coordinates: 13.704764°N 89.198078°W

Government Center Tower is a building located in the city of San Salvador, El Salvador. It houses the offices of the Ministry of the Interior.

Designed by French-born Salvadoran architect Manuel Roberto Meléndez Bischitz (1934-2011), its construction began during the tenure of Colonel Arturo Armando Molina and became operational during the tenure of President General Carlos Humberto Romero in 1980. Various government offices were housed in the tower.

In 1999, President Francisco Flores Pérez decided to allocate the tower exclusively to the Interior Ministry. The tower has 14 floors above street level and three underground and has a height of 65 meters (213.2 feet).
