= Carlos Humberto Romero =

President of El Salvador from 1977 to 1979

General Carlos Humberto Romero
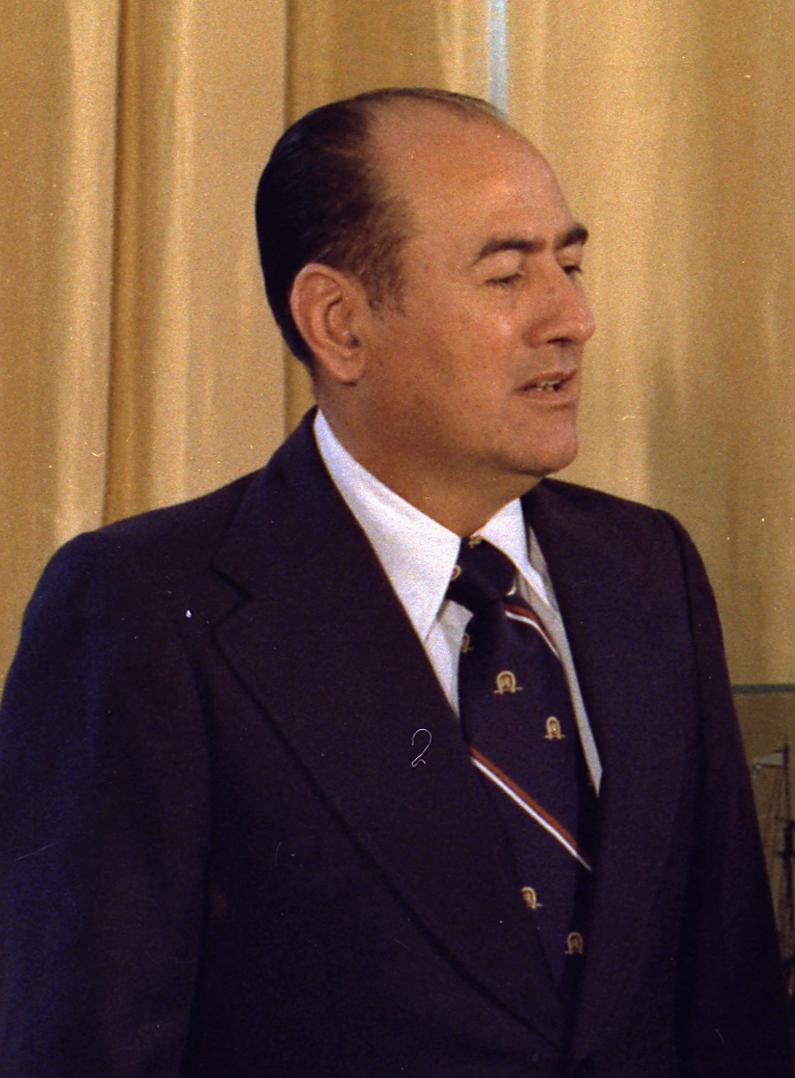
- Romero in 1977

34th President of El Salvador
- In office 1 July 1977 – 15 October 1979
- Vice President: Julio Ernesto Astacio
- Preceded by: Arturo Armando Molina
- Succeeded by: Adolfo Arnoldo Majano as Chairman of the Revolutionary Government Junta

37th Minister of Defense and Public Security of El Salvador
- In office 1 July 1972 – 1 July 1977
- President: Arturo Armando Molina
- Preceded by: Fidel Torres
- Succeeded by: Federico Castillo Yanes

Personal details
- Born: Carlos Humberto Romero Mena; 29 February 1924 Chalatenango, El Salvador
- Died: 27 February 2017 (aged 92) San Salvador, El Salvador
- Party: National Conciliation Party
- Spouse: Gloria Guerrero de Romero
- Children: 4
- Education: Captain General Gerardo Barrios Military School; School of the Americas
- Occupation: Military officer, politician, military attaché

Military service
- Allegiance: El Salvador
- Branch/service: Salvadoran Army
- Years of service: ?–1979
- Rank: General
- Battles/wars: 1972 Salvadoran coup attempt; 1979 Salvadoran coup d'état

Carlos Humberto Romero Mena (29 February 1924 – 27 February 2017) was a Salvadoran general and politician who served as the 34th President of El Salvador from 1 July 1977 until his overthrow on 15 October 1979. Romero was the final president of the El Salvador's military dictatorship that had ruled since 1931.

== Early life ==
Carlos Humberto Romero Mena was born on 29 February 1924 in Chalatenango, El Salvador. His parents were José María Romero (who died prior to Romero's birth) and Victoria Mena de Romero.

== Military career ==
Romero studied at the Captain General Gerardo Barrios Military School and the Command and General Staff School. Romero also traveled to Mexico City to specialize in horse riding. From January to March 1962, Romero attended the School of the Americas in the Panama Canal Zone to study counter-insurgency tactics. During the 1960s, Romero worked as an intelligence officer. Romero did not fight on the frontlines of the 1969 Football War against Honduras.

During his military service, Romero held various command positions over the Cavalry Group and the First Infantry Regiment. He also served as the assistant to the military attaché to the Salvadoran embassy to Mexico, the director of the Weapons and Services School, the head of Personnel of the General Staff of the Armed Forces, the chief of staff of the Armed Forces General Command. Romero attended the inaugurations of Mexican president Gustavo Díaz Ordaz in 1964 and Colombian president Misael Pastrana Borrero in 1970 as a delegate of the Salvadoran government. He also served as a delegate to the 7th Conference of American Armies in 1966 and the 6th Conference of American Intelligence Officers in 1967. In 1973, Romero served as the president of the Central American Defense Council.

== Early political career ==
Romero was a member of the National Conciliation Party (PCN).

=== Minister of Defense ===
Colonel Arturo Armando Molina won the 1972 presidential election, but the election was marked by fraud. On 25 March 1972, rebel military factions that supported National Opposition Union (UNO) (Note: The National Opposition Union was a coalition composed of the Christian Democratic Party, the National Revolutionary Movement, and the Nationalist Democratic Union.) candidate José Napoleón Duarte attempted a coup against President General Fidel Sánchez Hernández to prevent Molina from becoming President. Sánchez was captured as was Romero, who was then serving as Sánchez's chief of staff. The coup leaders eventually surrendered as they saw no opportunity for victory and many of its leaders were exiled.

On 1 July 1972, Molina became President of El Salvador. He appointed Romero to serve as Minister of Defense and Public Security. Romero oversaw all police and paramilitary activity. As minister, Romero became an ally of the country's landowning oligarchy as they believed that Romero would be able to protect their interests against communist groups as well as from agrarian reforms proposed by Molina. In February 1973, Romero claimed that he discovered a terrorist plan by the Communist Party of El Salvador (PCES) after several bombings occurred that targeted various businesses' headquarters. This led to the arrests of around 100 members of the Christian Democratic Party (PDC) that had no connections to the PCES or any militant activities.

=== 1977 presidential election ===
Ahead of the 1977 presidential election, the PCN evaluated between nominating Romero, Colonel José Guillermo García, and Colonel Carlos Eugenio Vides Casanova as its presidential candidate. The party ultimately chose Romero due to his counter-reformist positions. Romero ran against UNO's Colonel Ernesto Antonio Claramount Roseville. The election was held on 20 February 1977 and Romero was declared as the winner. He won 812,281 to Claramount's 394,661 votes.

According to historian Michael Krennerich, the election experienced "massive electoral fraud". UNO protested the result of the election and asked the Central Elections Council (CCE) to nullify the result. On 28 February, the National Police attacked an UNO protest against the result at the Plaza Libertad in San Salvador. The ensuing massacre killed up to 200 people, but official government records claim only 8 people were killed. On 2 March, the CCE ratified Romero's victory.

== Presidency ==
Romero was inaugurated as President of El Salvador on 1 July 1977 alongside Vice President Astacio. Romero's term was scheduled to last for five years until 1982.

Romero appointed a cabinet of 14 ministers. His cabinet ministers were Roberto Chico Duarte as Minister of Planning; Roberto Ortiz Ávalos as Minister of the Economy; René Fuentes Castellanos as Minister of Integration; Agrónomo Rutilio Aguilera as Minister of Agriculture and Livestock; Rafael Flores y Flores as Minister of Justice; Carlos Herrera Rebollo as Minister of Education; César Augusto Escalante as Minister of Public Health and Social Assistance; León Rivas Durán as Minister of Public Works; Colonel Roberto Escobar García as Minister of Labor and Social Forecast; Álvaro Ernesto Martínez as Minister of Foreign Relations; René López Bertrand as Minister of Finance; General Armando Leónidas Rojas as Minister of the Interior; General Federico Castillo Yanes as Minister of Defense and Public Security; and Astacio as Minister of the Presidency.

=== Political violence ===
Romero became President of El Salvador at a time when various leftist militant groups and right-wing death squads engaged in political violence. Attacks such as assassinations, kidnappings, and bombings increased during Romero's presidency. Only 12 days after Romero assumed office, former president Colonel Osmín Aguirre y Salinas was assassinated by the Farabundo Martí Popular Liberation Forces (FPL). Some of Romero's military officers were actively involved in death squad activity and commanded groups such as the White Warriors Union.

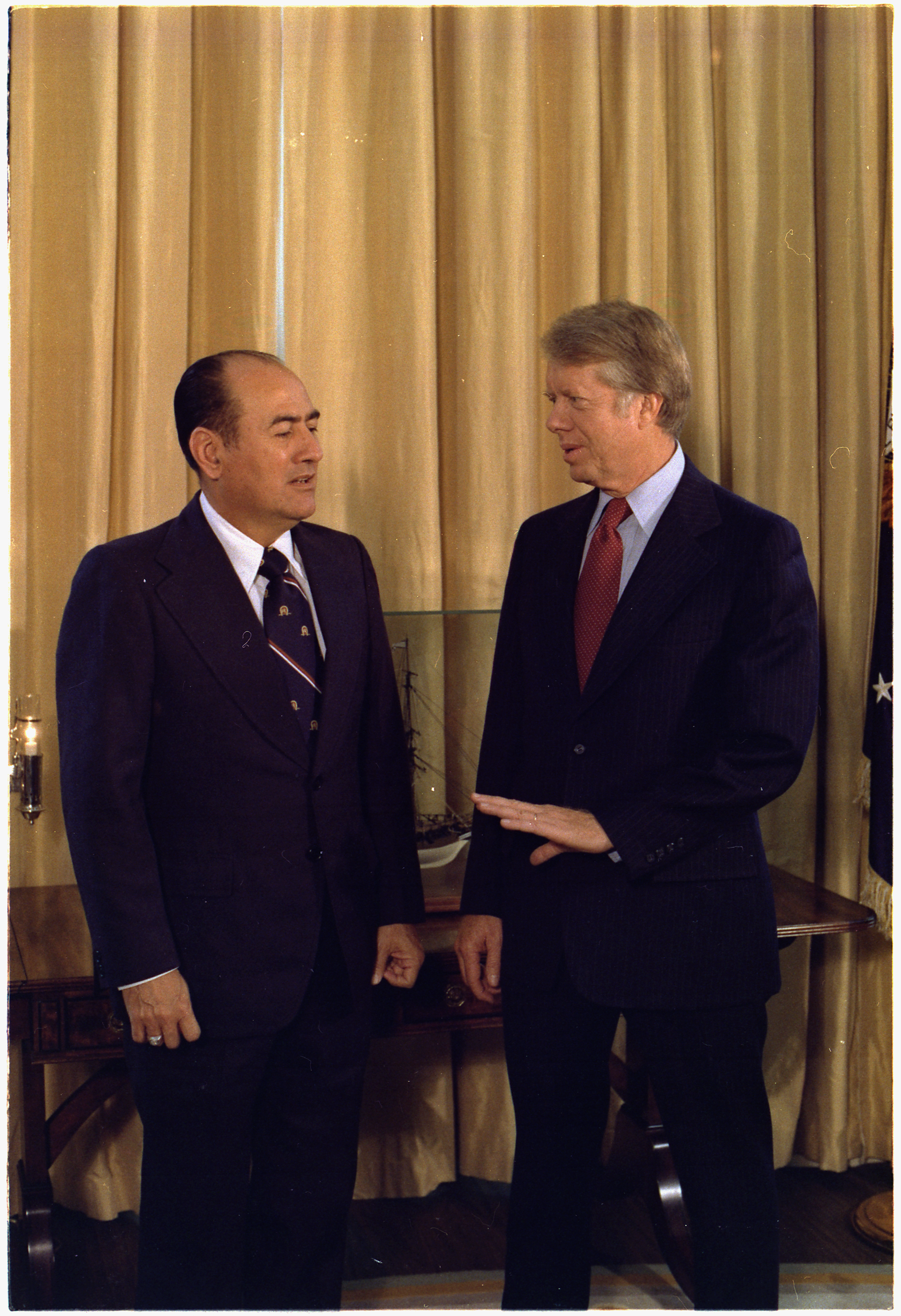
Romero with U.S. president Jimmy Carter on 8 September 1977 in Washington, D.C.

The government of U.S. president Jimmy Carter was concerned about the human rights situation of El Salvador due to attacks by death squads on Catholic clergy in the country. In August 1977, Romero met with Patricia Derian (the U.S. assistant secretary of state for democracy, human rights, and labor) and told her that "human rights are respected" in El Salvador. Romero met Carter in Washington, D.C. and Carter remarked that El Salvador's human rights situation had experienced "great progress" since Romero assumed office.

In November 1977, Romero enacted a law that legalized repression against opposition groups.

Romero's time in office was largely characterized by escalating violence and instability. In the late 1970s, political unrest increased, because of El Salvador's severe socio-economic inequalities unaddressed by his government and widespread discontent with government policy culminated in widespread protest and rebellion, which was met with reprisal by government forces. President Romero increased government education spending, but this won him no popularity with the left. The different police, military and government paramilitary forces launched a bloody repression campaign against leftist groups that ended the lives of 4 Catholic priests and numerous leaders and militants of workers and peasant organizations. He is accused of having ordered the student massacre of 30 July 1975. Left-wing armed groups responded to the violence exerted by the State with attacks on the security forces and government officials. The repression plunged the country into a serious social crisis.

=== Overthrow ===
When Nicaraguan president Anastasio Somoza Debayle was overthrown by the Sandinista National Liberation Front in July 1979, U.S. government officials began to privately urge Romero to resign to prevent a similar revolution from occurring against his government. At the same time, elements of the Salvadoran military began conspiring a coup to preserve the military's control of the government. The military also viewed Romero as a diplomatic liability due to his government's poor human rights record. Romero was apparently aware that a coup was being conspired against him and he had his family leave El Salvador to the United States on 14 October 1979.

On 15 October 1979, junior and reformist military officers initiated a coup against Romero. He surrendered and the rebels allowed Romero and several of his government officials to leave El Salvador at 4:30 p.m. for exile in Guatemala. The coup was bloodless, and by the end of the day, Romero fled El Salvador for Guatemala. Romero was replaced by the civilian-military Revolutionary Government Junta. Its leaders, Colonels Adolfo Arnoldo Majano and Jaime Abdul Gutiérrez, declared Romero, his ministers, the members of the Legislative Assembly, and the Supreme Court of Justice to be deposed. The United States was welcoming to news of Romero's overthrow. The coup against Romero marks the beginning of the 12-year-long Salvadoran Civil War.

Romero was El Salvador's last military president.

== Personal life ==
Romero married Gloria Guerrero and the couple had four children: Carlos Humberto, Luis Felipe, Gloria Valentina, and Roxana Carolina. The FPL assassinated Romero's brother, José Javier (a professor), on 7 September 1979 in Apopa.

== Later life and death ==
After being deposed, Romero fled El Salvador for exile in Guatemala; however, he later returned to El Salvador and settled in Colonia Escalón, a neighborhood of San Salvador.

Romero died of natural causes in Colonia Escalón on 27 February 2017 at 6:00 p.m. CST at the age of 92, two days before his 93rd birthday.

== Orders and decorations ==
Spain

- Collar of the Order of Isabella the Catholic (5 September 1977)

== Electoral history ==
Year	Office	Party	Main opponent and party		Votes for Romero				Result	Swing	Ref.
Year	Office	Party	Main opponent and party		Total	%	P.	±%	Result	Swing	Ref.
1977	President of El Salvador	PCN	Ernesto Claramount	UNO	812,281	67.30	1st	N/A	Won	Hold	

== See also ==
- List of heads of state and government with a military background

== Notes ==
Political offices
Preceded by Fidel Torres	Minister of Defense and Public Security of El Salvador; 1972–1977	Succeeded by Federico Castillo Yanes
Preceded by Arturo Armando Molina	President of El Salvador; 1977–1979	Succeeded by Revolutionary Government Junta
