= List of heads of state and government with a military background =

This is a list of heads of state and government in any country who were military personnel. It does not include people who served in the military as part of mandatory peacetime military service or those who only held rank due to their position in government.

== Africa ==
Portrait	Name	Countries	Official position	Service	Rank in military	Notes
	Mobutu Sese Seko	Belgian Congo; Republic of the Congo (Léopoldville); Zaire	President of the Democratic Republic of the Congo (1965–1971); President of Zaire (1971–1997)	1949–1997	NCO; Field Marshal (as president)	Served in the Congo Crisis and First Congo War.
	Laurent-Désiré Kabila	Democratic Republic of the Congo	President of the Democratic Republic of the Congo (1997–2001)			Served in the Simba Rebellion and First Congo War.
	Joseph Kabila	Democratic Republic of the Congo	President of the Democratic Republic of the Congo (2001–2019)		Major-General	
	Samuel Doe	Liberia	Chairman of the People's Redemption Council (1980–1986); President of Liberia (1986–1990)	1969–1985	Master Sergeant	Came to power in a coup d'etat.
	Muammar Gaddafi	Libya	Leader of Libya (1969–2011)	1961–2011	Colonel	
	Idi Amin	Uganda	President of Uganda (1971–1979)	1946–1979	Major-General; Field Marshal (self-awarded)	
	Bazilio Olara-Okello	Uganda	President of Uganda (1985)	1950–1971; 1979–1986	Lieutenant-General	Served in the 1972 invasion of Uganda, Uganda–Tanzania War, and Ugandan Bush War.
	Tito Okello	Uganda	President of Uganda (1985–1986)	1940–1971; 1979–1986	General	Served in World War II, the 1972 invasion of Uganda, Uganda–Tanzania War, and the Ugandan Bush War.
	Yoweri Museveni	Uganda	President of Uganda (1986–present)	1971–2004	General (as president)	Served in the 1972 invasion of Uganda, Uganda–Tanzania War, Ugandan Bush War, First Congo War, and Second Congo War
	Pasteur Bizimungu	Rwanda	President of Rwanda (1994–2000)	1990–1994		Served in the Rwandan Patriotic Front during the Rwandan Civil War.
	Juvénal Habyarimana	Rwanda	President of Rwanda (1973–1994)	1963–1994		Served during the Rwandan Civil War.
	Paul Kagame	Uganda; Rwanda	President of Rwanda (2000–present)	1979–2000		Served in the Ugandan Bush War. Commanded the Rwandan Patriotic Front during the Rwandan Civil War.

== Americas ==
Portrait	Name	Countries	Official position	Service	Rank in military	Notes
	Deodoro da Fonseca	Brazil	President of Brazil (1898–1991)	1843–1892	Generalissimo	
	Floriano Peixoto	Brazil	President of Brazil (1891–1894)	1861–1889	Field Marshal	
	Hermes da Fonseca	Brazil	President of Brazil (1910–1914)	1871–1906	Field Marshal	
	João de Deus Mena Barreto	Brazil	Member of the Brazilian Military Junta of 1930		Divisional General	
	Augusto Tasso Fragoso	Brazil	Member of the Brazilian Military Junta of 1930		Army General	
	Isaías de Noronha	Brazil	Member of the Brazilian Military Junta of 1930		Vice Admiral	
	Getúlio Vargas	Brazil	President of Brazil (1930–1945, 1951–1954)	1898–1903	Second Sergeant	
	Eurico Gaspar Dutra	Brazil	President of Brazil (1946–1951)	1922–1974	Field Marshal	
	Juscelino Kubitschek	Brazil	President of Brazil (1956–1961)	1931–1933, 1937–1940	Lieutenant colonel	
	Humberto de Alencar Castelo Branco	Brazil	President of Brazil (1964–1967)	1918–1964	Field marshal	
	Artur da Costa e Silva	Brazil	President of Brazil (1967–1969)	1921–1969	Field marshal	
	Augusto Rademaker	Brazil	Member of the Brazilian Military Junta of 1969		Almirant	
	Aurélio de Lira Tavares	Brazil	Member of the Brazilian Military Junta of 1969		Army General	
	Márcio Melo	Brazil	Member of the Brazilian Military Junta of 1969		Marshal of the Air	
	Emílio Garrastazu Médici	Brazil	President of Brazil (1969–1974)	1927–1969	Army General	
	Ernesto Geisel	Brazil	President of Brazil (1974–1979)	1927–1969	Army General	
	João Figueiredo	Brazil	President of Brazil (1979–1985)	1937–1979	Army General	
	Itamar Franco	Brazil	President of Brazil (1992–1995)		Officer candidate	
	Jair Bolsonaro	Brazil	President of Brazil (2019–2022)	1973–1988	Captain	
	Augusto Pinochet	Chile	President of Chile (1974–1990); President of the Government Junta of Chile (1973–1981)	1931–1998	Captain General	
	Francisco Morazán	Central America; Costa Rica; El Salvador; Honduras	President of Central America (1829, 1830–1834, 1835–1839); Head of State of Costa Rica (1842); Head of State of El Salvador (1832, 1839–1840); Head of State of Honduras (1827–1828, 1829, 1830)	1821–1840, 1842	General	Served in the First and Second Central American Civil Wars
	Simón Bolívar	Colombia; Peru; Bolivia	President of Colombia (1819–1830) Protector of the Republic of Bolivia (1825) President of Peru (1823–1824)	1810–1830	Captain General	Served in the Spanish American wars of independence and the Gran Colombia–Peru War
	António Pinto Soares	Costa Rica	Head of State of Costa Rica (1842)		General	Lead Costa Rican republican forces in opposition to the Mexican annexation of Central America
	Tomás Guardia Gutiérrez	Costa Rica	President of Costa Rica (1870–1876) (1877–1882)		Division General	Served in the Filibuster War
	Próspero Fernández Oreamuno	Costa Rica	President of Costa Rica (1882–1885)		Division General	Served in the Filibuster War. Died of natural causes while at war with Guatemala and Honduras during Barrios' War of Reunification
	Bernardo Soto Alfaro	Costa Rica	President of Costa Rica (1895–1889)		Division General	Solidified an alliance with El Salvador, Nicaragua, and Mexico to oppose Guatemala and Honduras during Barrios' War of Reunification
	Federico Tinoco Granados	Costa Rica	President of Costa Rica (1917–1919)		Brigadier General	
	Juan Bautista Quirós Segura	Costa Rica	Presdident of Costa Rica (1919)		General	
	Gerardo Machado	Cuba	President of Cuba (1925–1933)	1895–1898	Brigadier General	Served in the Cuban War of Independence
	Fulgencio Batista	Cuba	President of Cuba (1940–1944) (1952–1954) (1955–1959)	1921–1933	Major General	
	Fidel Castro	Cuba	President of the Council of State (1976–2008)	1953–1959	Commander	Served in the Cuban Revolution, the Escambray rebellion and the Bay of Pigs Invasion
	Raul Castro	Cuba	President of the Council of State (2008–2018)	1953–1959	General	Served in the Cuban Revolution, the Escambray rebellion and the Bay of Pigs Invasion
	Rafael Trujillo	Dominican Republic	Generalissimo of the Dominican Republic (1934–1961) President of the Dominican Republic (1930–1938, 1942–1952)	1916–1961	Generalissmo	
	Gerardo Barrios	El Salvador	President of El Salvador (1858, 1859–1860, 1861–1863)	1828–1863	Captain General	Served in the First and Second Central American Civil Wars, Malespín's War, Filibuster War, and War of 1863.
	Santiago González	El Salvador	President of El Salvador (1871–1876)		Marshal	Served in the War of 1863
	Fernando Figueroa	El Salvador	President of El Salvador (1885), 1907–1911)		General	Served in the War of 1863, Barrios' War of Reunification, Totoposte Wars, and the War of 1907.
	Francisco Menéndez	El Salvador	President of El Salvador (1885–1890)	?–1890	General	
	Carlos Ezeta	El Salvador	President of El Salvador (1890–1894)	1872–1894	General	Served in Barrios' War of Reunification, the Totoposte Wars, and the Revolution of the 44.
	Rafael Antonio Gutiérrez	El Salvador	President of El Salvador (1894–1898)	?–1898	General	Served in the Totoposte Wars and the Revolution of the 44.
	Tomás Regalado	El Salvador	President of El Salvador (1898–1903)	?–1906	General	
	Pedro José Escalón	El Salvador	President of El Salvador (1903–1907)		General	
	Maximiliano Hernández Martínez	El Salvador	President of El Salvador (1931–1934, 1935–1944)	1899–1944	General	Served in the Third Totoposte War and La Matanza
	Salvador Castaneda Castro	El Salvador	President of El Salvador (1944–1945)	1945–1948	General	Served in La Matanza
	Osmín Aguirre y Salinas	El Salvador	President of El Salvador (1944–1945)	?–1945	Colonel	Served in the Totoposte Wars and La Matanza.
	Óscar Osorio	El Salvador	President of El Salvador (1950–1956)		Lieutenant Colonel	
	José María Lemus	El Salvador	President of El Salvador (1956–1960)	1933–1960	Lieutenant Colonel	
	Julio Adalberto Rivera Carballo	El Salvador	President of El Salvador (1962–1967)		Lieutenant Colonel	
	Fidel Sánchez Hernández	El Salvador	President of El Salvador (1967–1972)	1938–?	General	Served in the Football War
	Arturo Armando Molina	El Salvador	President of El Salvador (1972–1977)		Colonel	
	Carlos Humberto Romero	El Salvador	President of El Salvador (1977–1979)	?–1979	General	
	Andrés Ignacio Menéndez	El Salvador	President of El Salvador (1934–1935, 1944)	1898–1944	General	Served in La Matanza
	Jacobo Árbenz	Guatemala	President of Guatemala (1944-1945; 1951–1954)	1932–1954	Colonel	
	David Canabarro	Juliana Republic	President of the Juliana Republic (1839)		Army General	
	Agustín I of Mexico	Spain; Mexican Empire	President of the Regency of Mexico (1821-1822) Emperor of Mexico (1822-1823)	1797–1820 (Spain) 1820–1821 (Mexico)	Colonel (Spain) General (Mexico)	Initially served the Spanish crown before changing sides during the Mexican War of Independence. Commanded the Imperial Army during the Mexican annexation of Central America and against republican forces during the Casa Mata Plan Revolution
	Guadalupe Victoria	Mexico	Member of the Supreme Executive Power (1823–1824) President of Mexico (1824-1829)	1812–1823 1836	Division General	Served in the Mexican War of Independence and for the republican forces during the Casa Mata Plan Revolution
	Vicente Guerrero	Mexico	Member of the Supreme Executive Power (1823–1824) President of Mexico (1829)	1810–1821	Division General	Served in the Mexican War of Independence and for the republican forces during the Casa Mata Plan Revolution. Commanded the Mexican Army during several Spanish attempts to re-establish control over Mexico
	Anastasio Bustamante	Spain; Mexican Empire; Mexico	President of Mexico (1930–1932) (1937–1939) (1939–1941)	1808–1821 (Spain) 1821–1830 (Mexico)	Colonel (Spain) General (Mexico)	Initially served the Spanish crown before changing sides during the Mexican War of Independence. Served in the Imperial Army of Agustín I during the Casa Mata Plan Revolution
	Melchor Múzquiz	Mexico	President of Mexico (1832)	1811–1830	Brigadier General	Served in the Mexican War of Independence and for the republican forces during the Casa Mata Plan Revolution
	Manuel Gómez Pedraza	Spain; Mexican Empire; Mexico	President of Mexico (1832–1833)	1810–1821 (Spain) 1821–1838 (Mexico)	Brigadier General	Initially served the Spanish crown before changing sides during the Mexican War of Independence. Served in the Imperial Army of Agustín I during the Casa Mata Plan Revolution
	Miguel Barragán	Spain; Mexico	President of Mexico (1835–1836)	1810–1821 (Spain) 1821–1834 (Mexico)	Colonel (Spain) Brigadier General (Mexico)	Initially served the Spanish crown before changing sides during the Mexican War of Independence. Defeated the last Spanish stronghold in Mexico during the Capture of San Juan de Ulúa
	Antonio López de Santa Anna	Spain; Mexico	President of Mexico (1833–1835) (1839) (1841–1844) (1847) (1853–1855)	1810–1855	Captain (Spain) Division General (Mexico)	Initially served the Spanish crown before changing sides during the Mexican War of Independence. Served the republican forces during the Casa Mata Plan Revolution. He later served during the Barradas Expedition, the Texas Revolution, the First Franco–Mexican War and the Mexican–American War
	Nicolás Bravo	Mexico	President of Mexico (1839) (1842–1843) (1846)	1810–1847	Division General	Served in the Mexican War of Independence and for the republican forces during The Casa Mata Plan Revolution. He later served during the Mexican–American War
	Mariano Arista	Spain; Mexico	President of Mexico (1851–1853)	1817–1821 (Spain) 1821–1851 (Mexico)	Lieutenant (Spain) Division General (Mexico)	Initially served the Spanish crown before changing sides during the Mexican War of Independence. He later served during the First Franco–Mexican war and the Mexican–American War
	Juan Almonte	Mexico; Second Mexican Empire	President of the Regency of Mexico (1963–1964)	1836–1874	Brigadier General	Served in the Texas Revolution and the Mexican–American war. Joined the conservative faction during the Reform War and the French-backed Mexican Empire during the Second Franco-Mexican War
	Maximilian I of Mexico	Empire of Austria; Second Mexican Empire	Emperor of Mexico (1864–1867)	1854–1864	Counter Admiral (Empire of Austria)	
	Porfirio Díaz	Mexico	President of Mexico (1877–1980) (1884–1911)	1848–1876	Division General	Served in the Revolution of Ayutla, the Reform War and the Second Franco–Mexican War
	Victoriano Huerta	Mexico	President of Mexico (1913–1914)	1877–1907; 1910–1914	Brigadier General	Served in the Yaqui Wars, the Caste War of Yucatán and the Mexican Revolution
	Alvaro Obregón	Mexico	President of Mexico (1920–1924)	1912–1920	Division General	Served in the Mexican Revolution, the Border War and the Rebellion of Agua Prieta
	Plutarco Elías Calles	Mexico	President of Mexico (1924–1928)	1911–1920 1929	Division General	Served in the Mexican Revolution, the Rebellion of Agua Prieta, the Delahuertista Rebellion and the Escobar Rebellion
	Lázaro Cárdenas	Mexico	President of Mexico (1934–1940)	1913–1933 1941–1945	Division General	Served in the Mexican Revolution, the Delahuertista Rebellion, the Escobar Rebellion and World War II
	Manuel Ávila Camacho	Mexico	President of Mexico (1940–1946)	1914–1939	Brigadier General	Served in the Mexican Revolution, the Delahuertista Rebellion, the Escobar Rebellion and La Cristiada
	Anastasio Somoza García	Nicaragua	President of Nicaragua (1950–1956)	?–1956	Brigadier General	Served in Constitutionalist War
	Anastasio Somoza Debayle	Nicaragua	President of Nicaragua (1967–1972) (1974–1979)	1947–1979	Major General	
	Daniel Ortega	Nicaragua	Coordinator of the Junta of National Reconstruction (1979–1985) President of Nicaragua (1985–1990) (2007–2025) Co-president of Nicaragua (2025–Present)	1956–1990	Major	Served in the Sandinista Revolution
	José de San Martín	Spain; Argentina; Chile; Peru	Protector of Peru (1821–1822	1789–1822	Captain (Argentina) Captain General (Chile) Generalissimo (Peru)	Served in the War of the Second Coalition, the Peninsular War and the Spanish American wars of independence
	Sam Houston	United States; Republic of Texas	President of Texas (1836–1838) (1841–1844)	1813–1818 (United States) 1835–1836 (Texas)	First Lieutenant (United States) Major General (Texas)	Served in the War of 1812, the Creek War and the Texas Revolution
	Bento Gonçalves	Riograndense Republic	President of the Riograndense Republic (1836–1841)	1811–1844		
	George Washington	Great Britain; United States	President of the United States (1789–1797)	1752–1758 (Virginia Militia) 1775–1799 (United States)	Colonel (Virginia Militia); Commander-in-chief (Continental Army); General of the Armies (posthumously)	Served Great Britain as part of the Virginia militia during the French and Indian War. Later Commanded the Continental Army during the American Revolutionary War
	Andrew Johnson	United States	President of the United States (1865–1869)	1862–1865	Brigadier General	
	Ulysses S. Grant	United States	President of the United States (1869–1877)	1839–1854; 1861–1869	General of the Army; General of the Armies (posthumously)	Served in the Mexican–American War. Commanding General of the Union Army in the American Civil War
	William McKinley	United States	President of the United States (1897–1901)	1861–1865	Brevet Major	Served in American Civil War
	Theodore Roosevelt	United States	President of the United States (1901–1909)	1882–1886	Colonel	Served in Spanish–American War
	Harry S. Truman	United States	President of the United States (1945–1953)	1917–1919	Colonel	Served in World War I.
	Dwight D. Eisenhower	United States	President of the United States (1953–1961)	1915–1953; 1961–1969	General of the Army	Commander of American forces on Western Front during World War II
	John F. Kennedy	United States	President of the United States (1961–1963)	1941–1945	Lieutenant	Served in World War II
	Lyndon B. Johnson	United States	President of the United States (1963–1969)	1941–1942	Commander	Served in World War II
	Richard Nixon	United States	President of the United States (1969–1974)	1942–1946	Commander	Served in World War II
	Gerald Ford	United States	President of the United States (1974–1977)	1942–1946	Lieutenant Commander	Served in World War II
	Jimmy Carter	United States	President of the United States (1977–1981)	1946–1953	Lieutenant	
	Ronald Reagan	United States	President of the United States (1981–1989)	1942–1945	Captain	Served on American Theater of World War II
	George H. W. Bush	United States	President of the United States (1989–1993)	1942–1955	Lieutenant	
	George W. Bush	United States	President of the United States (2001–2009)	1968–1974	First Lieutenant	

== Asia ==
Portrait	Name	Countries	Official position	Service	Rank in military	Notes
	Mohammed Najibullah	Democratic Republic of Afghanistan	General Secretary of the People's Democratic Party of Afghanistan (1986–1992)	1965–1992	Major-General (KHAD); General (as General Secretary)	Served in the Soviet–Afghan War
	Abdul Qadir	Democratic Republic of Afghanistan	Head of state of Afghanistan (1978)	1962–1989	Colonel-General	Served in the Soviet–Afghan War
	Sibghatullah Mojaddedi	Afghan mujahideen	President of Afghanistan (1992)		1979–1992	Served in the Soviet–Afghan War
	Burhanuddin Rabbani	Afghan mujahideen	President of Afghanistan (1992–2001)	1979–1992		Served in the Soviet–Afghan War
	Gulbuddin Hekmatyar	Hezbi Islami; Afghan mujahideen Hezb-e Islami Gulbuddin	Prime Minister of Afghanistan (1993–1994, 1996–1997)	1979–present		Serving in the Afghanistan conflict (1978–present)
	Ahmad Shah Ahmadzai	Afghan mujahideen	Prime Minister of Afghanistan (1995–1996)	1979–1992		Served in the Soviet–Afghan War
	Mohammad Rabbani	Afghan mujahideen Taliban	Prime Minister of Afghanistan (1996–2001)	1979–1991	Served during the Soviet–Afghan War	
	Yuan Shikai	Qing Dynasty (Republic of China (1912–1949)) Republic of China; Empire of China	Prime Minister of the Qing Dynasty (1911–1912) President of the Republic of China (1912–1915, 1916) Emperor of China (1915–1916) (1881–1916)	1881–1916	Generalissimo	Served in the First Sino-Japanese War and National Protection War
	Duan Qirui	Qing Dynasty (Republic of China (1912–1949)) Republic of China	Chief Executive of the Republic of China (1924–1926); Premier of the Republic of China (1916–1917, 1917, 1918)	1885–1926	General	Served in the Boxer Rebellion and Warlord Era.
	Li Yuanhong	Qing Dynasty (Republic of China (1912–1949)) Republic of China	President of the Republic of China (1916–1917, 1922–1923)	1889–1912		Served in the First Sino-Japanese War.
	Feng Guozhang	Qing Dynasty (Republic of China (1912–1949)) Republic of China	President of the Republic of China (1917–1918)		General officer	Served in the National Protection War.
	Cao Kun	Qing Dynasty (Republic of China (1912–1949)) Republic of China	President of the Republic of China (1923–1924)		General	Served in the First Sino-Japanese War, National Protection War, and Warlord Era.
	Sa Zhenbing	Qing Dynasty (Republic of China (1912–1949)) (Taiwan) Republic of China	Premier of the Republic of China (1920)	1869–1946	Admiral	Served in the National Protection War
	Zhou Ziqi	Qing Dynasty (Republic of China (1912–1949)) Republic of China	President of the Republic of China (1922)			
	Du Xigui	Qing Dynasty (Republic of China (1912–1949)) (Taiwan) Republic of China	President of the Republic of China (1926); Premier of the Republic of China (1926)	1902–1933	Admiral	Served in the Chinese Civil War
	Zhang Zuolin	Qing Dynasty (Republic of China (1912–1949)) Republic of China	Generalissimo of the Military Government of China (1927–1928)	1900–1928	Grand Marshal; Generalissimo	Served in the First Sino-Japanese War, Boxer Rebellion, Warlord Era, and Northern Expedition
	Chiang Kai-shek	Empire of Japan; Republic of China; Taiwan	Chairman of the National Government of China (1943–1948); President of the Republic of China (1948–1949, 1950–1975); Premier of the Republic of China (1930–1931, 1935–1938, 1939–1945, 1947)	1909–1975	Generalissimo	Leader of Nationalist Chinese forces during the Northern Expedition, Chinese Civil War, and World War II
	Zhang Shaozeng	Qing Dynasty (Republic of China (1912–1949)) Republic of China	Premier of the Republic of China (1923)			
	Jiang Chaozong	Qing Dynasty (Republic of China (1912–1949)) Republic of China	Premier of the Republic of China (1917)		General	
	Jin Yunpeng	Qing Dynasty (Republic of China (1912–1949)) Republic of China	Premier of the Republic of China (1919–1920, 1920–1921)		General	
	Chen Mingshu	Republic of China	Premier of the Republic of China (1931)			Also a leader of the Fujian People's Government
	He Yingqin	Qing Dynasty; Republic of China; Taiwan	Premier of the Republic of China (1949)	1908–1987	General	Served during the Northern Expedition, Chinese Civil War, and World War II
	Zhu De	Republic of China; Communist China; China	Chairman of the Standing Committee of the National People's Congress (1975–1976)	1927–1976	General (Republic of China); Marshal (People's Republic of China)	Served in Communist Chinese forces during the Chinese Civil War and World War II. Also served in the Northern Expedition and encirclement campaigns
	Ye Jianying	Republic of China; Communist China; China	Chairman of the Standing Committee of the National People's Congress (1978–1983)	1917–1985	Lieutenant-General (Republic of China); Marshal (People's Republic of China)	Served in Communist Chinese forces during the Chinese Civil War and World War II. Also participated in the Nanchang uprising
	Wang Jingwei	Republic of China	President of the Republic of China (Reorganized National Government, 1940–1944); Premier of the Republic of China (1932–1935)	1940–1944	Generalissimo	Led collaborationist Chinese forces during World War II
	Mao Zedong	Peoples's Republic of China	Chairman of the People's Republic of China (1959–1968); Chairman of the People's Republic of China (1949–1959)	1927–1949		Led Communist Chinese forces during the Chinese Civil War and World War II
	Zhou Enlai	Republic of China; Communist China; China	Premier of the People's Republic of China (1949–1976)	1937–1949	Lieutenant general (Republic of China)	Served in Communist Chinese forces during the Chinese Civil War and World War II. Also served in the Northern Expedition, encirclement campaigns, and Nanchang uprising
	Dong Biwu	People's Republic of China	Chairman of the People'Republic of China (1972–1975)	1927–1949		Served in Communist Chinese forces during the Chinese Civil War and World War II
	Hua Guofeng	Peoples's Republic of China	Premier of the People's Republic of China (1976–1980) Chairman of the Chinese Communist Party (1976–1981)	1938–1949		Served in Communist Chinese forces during the Chinese Civil War and World War II
	Hu Yaobang	Peoples's Republic of China	General Secretary of the Chinese Communist Party (1982–1987)	1927–1949		Served in Communist Chinese forces during the Chinese Civil War and World War II. Also participated in the encirclement campaigns. Child soldier.
	Li Xiannian	Peoples's Republic of China	President of the People's Republic of China (1983–1988)	1927–1949		Served in Communist Chinese forces during the Chinese Civil War and World War II
	Liu Shaoqi	Peoples's Republic of China	Chairman of the People's Republic of China (1959–1968)	1941–1949		Served in Communist Chinese forces during the Chinese Civil War and World War II
	Yang Shangkun	Peoples's Republic of China	Chairman of the People's Republic of China	President of the People's Republic of China (1988–1993)	1931–1949	Served in Communist Chinese forces during the Chinese Civil War and World War II
	Deng Xiaoping	Peoples's Republic of China	Paramount leader of China (1978–1989); Secretary-General of the Secretariat of the Chinese Communist Party (1956–1967)	1929–1952; 1975–1980	Chief of the General Staff	Served in Communist Chinese forces during the Chinese Civil War and World War II
	Zhao Ziyang	Peoples's Republic of China	General Secretary of the Chinese Communist Party (1987–1989); Premier of the People's Republic of China (1980–1987)			Served in Communist Chinese forces during the Chinese Civil War and World War II
	Mohammad Khatami	Iran	President of Iran (1997–2005)	1968–1970	Second Lieutenant	
	Abd al-Karim Qasim	Iraq	Prime Minister of Iraq (1958–1963)	1932–1963	Major-General	Served in World War II.
	Ahmed Hassan al-Bakr	Ba'athist Iraq	President of Iraq (1968–1979)	1938–1959	Brigadier; Marshal (as president)	Served in the Anglo-Iraqi War
	Yitzhak Rabin	Israel	Prime Minister of Israel (1974–1977, 1992–1995)	1948–1974	Lieutenant-General	Served in the Syria–Lebanon campaign, Jewish insurgency in Mandatory Palestine, 1948 Palestine war, and Six-Day War.|
	Menachem Begin	Second Polish Republic; Israel	Prime Minister of Israel (1977–1983)	1941–1942; 1943–1948	Corporal (Poland)	Served in the Jewish insurgency in Mandatory Palestine and 1947–1948 civil war in Mandatory Palestine.
	Chaim Herzog	United Kingdom; Israel	President of Israel (1983–1993)	1943–1947; 1948–1962	Major (United Kingdom); Major-General (Israel)	Served in World War II and the 1948 Palestine war.
	Ehud Barak	Israel	Prime Minister of Israel (1999–2001)	1959–1995	Lieutenant-General	Served in the Six-Day War, Yom Kippur War, and Operation Entebbe.
	Ezer Weizmann	United Kingdom; Israel	President of Israel (1993–2000)	1942–1945; 1946–1969	Major-General	Served in World War II, the 1948 Palestine War, Suez Crisis, Six-Day War, and War of Attrition
	Ariel Sharon	Israel	Prime Minister of Israel (2001–2006)	1948–1974	Major-General	Served in the 1948 Palestine war, Suez Crisis, Six-Day War, and Yom Kippur War
	Naftali Bennett	Israel	Prime Minister of Israel (2021–2022)	1990–1996; 2006	Major	Served in the First Intifada, South Lebanon conflict (1985–2000), Second Intifada, and 2006 Lebanon War
	Isaac Herzog	Israel	President of Israel (2021–present)	1978	Major	
	Enomoto Takeaki	Tokugawa bakufu Republic of Ezo; Empire of Japan	Sosai of the Republic of Ezo (1869)	1974-1908	Vice Admiral	Served the Togugawa bakufu during the Boshin War
	Yamagata Aritomo	Chōshū Domain; Empire of Japan	Prime Minister of Japan (1889–1891) 1998–1900)	1868–1905	Field Marshal (Gensui)	Lead Chōshū trops against the Tokugawa bakufu during the Boshin War. Commanded the newly formed Imperial Japanese Army in the Satsuma Rebellion, the First Sino-Japanese War and the Russo-Japanese War
	Maung Maung Kha	Empire of Japan; Myanmar	Prime Minister of Burma (1977–1988)	1941–1948	Colonel	Served in World War II
	Ne Win	Empire of Japan; Myanmar	President of Burma (1962–1981); Prime Minister of Burma (1958–1960, 1962–1974)	1931–1974	General	Served in World War II
	Sein Lwin	Myanmar	Prime Minister of Burma (1974–1977)	1943–1988	Brigadier-General	
	Aye Ko	Myanmar	Acting President of Burma (1988)	1952–1985		
	Khin Nyunt	Myanmar	Prime Minister of Myanmar (2003–2004)	1960–2004	General	
	San Yu	Myanmar	President of Burma (1981–1988)	1942–1980	General	
	Saw Maung	Myanmar	Chairman of the State Law and Order Restoration Council (1988–1992); Prime Minister of Burma (1988–1992)	1945–1992	Senior General	
	Sein Win	Empire of Japan; Myanmar	Prime Minister of Burma (1974–1977)	1942–1972	Brigadier-General	Served in World War II.
	Min Aung Hlaing	Myanmar	Chairman of the State Administration Council (2021–present); Prime Minister of Myanmar (2021–present)	1972–present	Senior General	
	Myint Swe	Myanmar	President of Myanmar (2018, 2021–present)	1971–2010	Lieutenant-General	
	Soe Win	Myanmar	Prime Minister of Myanmar (2004–2007)	1965–2007	General	
	Thein Sein	Myanmar	President of Myanmar (2011–2016); Prime Minister of Myanmar (2007–2010); First Secretary of the State Peace and Development Council (2004–2007)		Senior General	
	Tin Aung Myint Oo	Myanmar	First Secretary of the State Peace and Development Council (2007–2010)		General	
	Tun Tin	Myanmar	Prime Minister of Burma (1988)		Brigadier-General	
	Abhisit Vejjajiva	Thailand	Prime Minister of Thailand (2008–2011)	1987–1988	Second Lieutenant	
	Aditya Dibabha	Thailand	Regent of Thailand (1935–1938); President of the Regency Council (1935–1938)	1927–1938	Lieutenant General; Vice Admiral; Air Marshal	
	Adun Adundetcharat	Thailand	Regent of Thailand (1947–1949)	1916–1947	General; Admiral; Air Chief Marshal	
	Alongkot, the Prince Adireksorn Udomsakdi	Thailand	Regent of Thailand (1947–1949)	1899–1949	General; Vice Admiral	
	Bhumibol Adulyadej	Thailand	King of Thailand (1946–2016)	1946	Lieutenant	
	Chalit Pukbhasuk	Thailand	Acting President of the Council for National Security (2007–2008)	1966–2008	Air Chief Marshal	Served in the Communist insurgency in Thailand, the Vietnamese border raids in Thailand, and the Thai–Laotian Border War
	Chatichai Choonhavan	Thailand	Prime Minister of Thailand (1988–1991)	1940–1958	General; Admiral; Air Chief Marshal	Served in the Franco-Thai War, the Burma campaign, and the Korean War
	Chavalit Yongchaiyudh	Thailand	Prime Minister of Thailand (1996–1997)	1954–1990	General; Admiral; Air Chief Marshal	Served in the Vietnam War
	Chitcharoen, the Prince Narisara Nuwattiwong	(Thailand) Siam	Regent of Siam (1934–1935)	1888–1932	General	
	Chuang Bunnag, Somdet Chaophraya Borom Maha Sri Suriwongse	(Thailand) Siam	Regent of Siam (1868–1873)			
	Khuang Aphaiwong	(Thailand) Siam	Prime Minister of Siam (1944–1945, 1946, 1947–1948)	1940–1941	Major	
	Kriangsak Chamanan	Thailand	Prime Minister of Thailand (1977–1980)	1940–1980	General; Admiral; Air Chief Marshal	Served in the Pacific War and the Korean War
	Kukrit Pramoj	Thailand	Prime Minister of Thailand (1975–1976)	1988	Major General	
	Oscar Nuthit, the Prince Anuvatana Chaturon	(Thailand) Siam	Regent of Siam (1935); President of the Regency Council (1935)	1917–1935	Colonel	
	Pan Sukhum, Chao Phraya Yommarat	(Thailand) Siam	Regent of Siam (1935–1938)	1935–1938	Colonel; Group Captain	
	Paribatra Sukhumbandhu, Prince of Nakhon Sawan	(Thailand) Siam	Regent of Siam (1932)	1904–1932	Field Marshal; Admiral of the Fleet	
	Phin Choonhavan	(Thailand) Siam	Head of the National Military Council (1947)	1916–1954	Field marshal Admiral; Air Chief Marshal	Served in the Boworadet Rebellion, the Franco-Thai War and the Burma campaign
	Phot Phahonyothin, Phraya Phahonphonphayuhasena	(Thailand) Siam	Prime Minister of Siam (1933–1938)	1914–1947	General; Admiral; Air Chief Marshal	
	Plaek Phibunsongkhram	Thailand	Prime Minister of Thailand (1938–1944, 1948–1957)	1914–1957	Field marshal Admiral of the Fleet; Marshal of the Air Force	Served in the Boworadet Rebellion
	Prajadhipok	(Thailand) Siam	Regent of Siam (1925); King of Siam (1925–1935)	1913–1925	Colonel	
	Prawit Wongsuwon	Thailand	Acting Prime Minister of Thailand (2022)	1969–2005	General	Served in the Vietnam War and the Laotian Civil War
	Prayut Chan-o-cha	Thailand	Leader of the National Council for Peace and Order (2014–2019); Prime Minister of Thailand (2014–2023)	1976–2014	General	Served in the Vietnamese border raids in Thailand
	Prem Tinsulanonda	Thailand	Prime Minister of Thailand (1980–1988); Regent of Thailand (2016)	1941–1988	General; Admiral; Air Chief Marshal	Served in the Franco-Thai War, and the Pacific War
	Rangsit Prayurasakdi, Prince of Chai Nat	Thailand	Regent of Thailand (1946–1949, 1949, 1950–1951); President of the Regency Council (1947–1949)	1911–1951	General	
	Sangad Chaloryu	Thailand	Head of the National Administrative Reform Council (1976); Head of the Revolutionary Council (1977)	1933–1977	General; Admiral; Air Chief Marshal	Served in the Pacific War, the Korean War and the Manhattan Rebellion
	Sarit Thanarat	Thailand	Head of the Revolutionary Council (1957, 1958–1959); Prime Minister of Thailand (1959–1963)	1928–1963	Field marshal Admiral of the Fleet; Marshal of the Air Force	Served in the Boworadet Rebellion and the Pacific War
	Sirikit	Thailand	Regent of Thailand (1956)	1959–1992	Field marshal Admiral of the Fleet; Marshal of the Air Force	
	Sonthi Boonyaratglin	Thailand	head of the Council for Democratic Reform (2006); President of the Council for National Security (2006–2007)	1969–2007	General	Served in the Vietnam War and the Communist insurgency in Thailand
	Sri Bajarindra	(Thailand) Siam	Regent of Siam (1897)	1912–1919	Colonel	
	Srinagarindra	Thailand	Regent of Thailand (1959, 1960, 1960–1961, 1962, 1964, 1966, 1967)	1980–1995	General; Admiral; Air Chief Marshal	
	Suchinda Kraprayoon	Thailand	Prime Minister of Thailand (1992)	1953–1992	General; Admiral; Air Chief Marshal	Served in the Vietnam War and the Communist insurgency in Thailand
	Sunthorn Kongsompong	Thailand	Chairman of the National Peace Keeping Council (1991–1992)	1954–1991	General; Admiral; Air Chief Marshal	Served in the Korean War and the Vietnam War
	Surayud Chulanont	Thailand	Prime Minister of Thailand (2006–2008)	1965–2003	General; Admiral; Air Chief Marshal	Served in the Communist insurgency in Thailand
	Thaksin Shinawatra	Thailand	Prime Minister of Thailand (2001–2006)	1969–1973	Cadet	
	Thanom Kittikachorn	Thailand	Prime Minister of Thailand (1958, 1963–1971, 1972–1973); Head of the Revolutionary Council (1971–1972)	1929–1973	Field marshal Admiral of the Fleet; Marshal of the Air Force	Served in the Franco-Thai War and the Pacific War
	Thawan Thamrongnawasawat	(Thailand) Siam	Prime Minister of Siam (1946–1947)	1924–1947	Major General; Rear Admiral; Group Captain	
	Um Indrayodhin, Chao Phraya Bijayendra Yodhin	Thailand	Regent of Thailand (1935–1942)	1890–1932	General	
	Vajiralongkorn	Thailand	King of Thailand (2016–present)	1965–2016	General; Admiral; Air Chief Marshal	Served in the Communist insurgency in Thailand
	Vajiravudh	(Thailand) Siam	Regent of Siam (1907); King of Siam (1910–1925)	1899–1910		
	Emilio Aguinaldo	The Philippines	President of the Philippine Republic	1896–1901	Generalissimo	Served in the Philippine Revolution, the Spanish–American War and the Philippine–American War
	Lee Hsien Loong	Singapore	Prime Minister of Singapore (2004–2024)	1972-1984	Brigadier-General	

== Europe ==
Portrait	Name	Countries	Official position	Service	Rank in military	Notes
	Mehmet Shehu	People's Socialist Republic of Albania	Prime Minister of Albania (1954–1981)	1936–1939; 1942–1948	General	Served in the Spanish Civil War, Albanian partisan leader during World War II
	Alfred Moisiu	People's Socialist Republic of Albania	President of Albania (2002–2007)	1949–1985	General	
	Enver Hoxha	People's Socialist Republic of Albania	First Secretary of the Party of Labour of Albania (1941–1985); Prime Minister of Albania (1944–1954)	1941–1945; 1944–1985	General	Leader of Albanian communist partisans during World War II.
	Bajram Begaj	Albania	President of Albania (2022–present)	1988–2022	Major-General	
	Alexander Lukashenko	Belarus	President of Belarus (1994–present)	1994–present	Lieutenant-Colonel	
	Rumen Radev	Bulgaria	President of Bulgaria (2017–2026)	1987–2017	Major general	
	Klement Gottwald	Czechoslovakia	President of Czechoslovakia (1948–1953) Prime Minister of Czechoslovakia (1946–1948)	1915–1920	Corporal	Served in World War I and Hungarian–Czechoslovak War.
	Antonín Zápotocký	Czechoslovakia	President of Czechoslovakia (1953–1957) Prime Minister of Czechoslovakia (1948–1953)	1914–1918		Served in World War I.
	Jan Syrový	Czechoslovakia	Prime Minister of Czechoslovakia (1938)	1914–1938	General	Served in World War I and commanded Czechoslovak Legion in Russia.
	Ludvík Svoboda	Czechoslovakia	President of Czechoslovakia (1968–1975)	1915–1950	General	Served in World War I and Commanded Czechoslovak units on Eastern front during World War II
	Petr Pavel	Czech Republic	President of the Czech Republic (2023–present)	1983–2018	General	Served in United Nations Protection Force during which he led a military operation which save over 50 French soldiers
	Alois Eliáš	Protectorate of Bohemia and Moravia	Prime Minister of the Protectorate of Bohemia and Moravia (1939–1941)	1915–1942	Major-General; General (posthumous)	
	Urho Kekkonen	Finland	President of Finland (1956–1981)	1918	Sergeant (1920)	Served on the 'White' side in the Finnish Civil War in 1918
	Mauno Koivisto	Finland	President of Finland (1982–1994)	1939–1944	Corporal	Served in the Winter War and the Continuation War.
	Martti Ahtisaari	Finland	President of Finland (1994–2000)		Reserve Captain	
	Juha Sipilä	Finland	Prime Minister of Finland (2015–2019)		Reserve Captain	
	Petteri Orpo	Finland	Prime Minister of Finland (2023–present)		Reserve Captain	
	Gustaf Mannerheim	Finland	Regent of Finland (1918–1919); President of Finland (1944–1946)	1891–1917 (Russia); 1918, 1939–1944 (Finland)	Lieutenant-General (Russia); Marshal of Finland (Finland)	Served in World War I for Imperial Russia. Led the Finnish government armed forces (the "White" forces) in the Finnish Civil War, led the Finnish armed forces in the Winter War, Continuation War, Lapland War
	René Coty	France	President of France (1954–1959)	1914–1918		Served in World War I
	Charles de Gaulle	France	President of France (1959–1969); Prime Minister of France (1958–1959); Chairman of the Provisional Government of the French Republic (1944–1946)	1912–1944	Brigadier-General	Served in World War I. Leader of Free France
	Paul von Hindenburg	Germany	President of Germany (1925–1934)	1866–1911; 1914–1918	Field Marshal	Commander of the Imperial German Army during World War I
	Adolf Hitler	Nazi Germany	Führer of Germany (1934–1945); Chancellor of Germany (1933–1945)	1914–1918	Corporal	Served in World War I
	Karl Carstens	West Germany	President of West Germany (1979–1984)	1939–1945	Second Lieutenant	Served in World War II
	Heinrich Lübke	West Germany	President of West Germany (1959–1969)	1914–1918	Captain	Served in World War I.
	Walter Scheel	West Germany	President of West Germany (1974–1979)	1939–1945	First Lieutenant	Served as combat pilot during World War II.
	Richard von Weizsäcker	Germany	President of Germany (1984–1994)	1938–1945	Captain	Served in World War II.
	Horst Köhler	Germany	President of Germany (2004–2010)	1963–1965	Reserve Lieutenant	
	Nicolae Timofti	Moldova	President of Moldova (2012–2016)	1972–1974	Senior lieutenant	
	Wojciech Jaruzelski	Poland	President of Poland (1989–1990); Prime Minister of Poland (1981–1985)	1943–1991	General	Served in World War II
	Józef Piłsudski	Poland	Prime Minister of Poland (1926–1928); Chief of State (1918–1922)	1914–1935	Marshal of Poland	Commander of Polish Legions in World War I
	António Ramalho Eanes	Portugal	President of Portugal (1976–1986)	1952–1986	General	
	Dmitry Medvedev	Russia	President of Russia (2008–2012); Prime Minister of Russia (2012–2020)	2008–2012	Colonel	
	Vladimir Putin	Russia	President of Russia (2000–2008; 2012–present); Prime Minister of Russia (1999–2000, 2008–2012)	2000–present	Colonel (KGB)	
	Leonid Brezhnev	Soviet Union	General Secretary of the Communist Party of the Soviet Union (1964–1982); Chairman of the Presidium of the Supreme Soviet (1977–1982)	1941–1982	Major-General (Commissar); Marshal of the Soviet Union (as General Secretary)	Served in World War II
	Nikita Khrushchev	Soviet Union	First Secretary of the Communist Party of the Soviet Union (1953–1964); Chairman of the Council of Ministers (1958–1964)	1941–1945	Lieutenant-General (Commissar)	Served in World War II.
	Konstantin Chernenko	Soviet Union	General Secretary of the Communist Party of the Soviet Union (1984–1985); Chairman of the Presidium of the Supreme Soviet (1984–1985)	1930–1933		
	Charles X Gustavus of Sweden	Sweden	King of Sweden (1654–1660)	1642–1660		Served in the Thirty Years' War; Led the Swedish army in the Second Northern War (1655–1660)
	Charles XI of Sweden	Sweden	King of Sweden (1660–1697)	1660–1697		Led the Swedish army in the Scanian War (1675–1679).
	Gustavus II Adolphus of Sweden	Sweden	King of Sweden (1611–1632)	1611–1632		Led the Swedish army in the Polish–Swedish War (1626–1629) and the Thirty Years' War.
	Charles XII of Sweden	Sweden	King of Sweden (1697–1718)	1697–1700		Led the Swedish army in the Great Northern War (1700–1718)
	Frederick I of Sweden	Hesse-Kassel; Sweden	King of Sweden (1720–1751)	1703–1706; 1716–1718	Lieutenant General (Hesse-Kassel); Generalissimo (Sweden)	Lead Hessian troops in the War of the Spanish Succession. Joined the campaign of Charles XII of Sweden against Norway in the last years of the Great Northern War.
	Charles XIV John of Sweden	Sweden	Prince of Pontecorvo (1805–1809); King of Sweden and Norway (1818–1844)	1780–1809 (France); 1809–1814 (Sweden)	Marshal of France (France); Generalissimo (Sweden)	Raised to the highest ranks in the revolutionary and Napoelonic armies of France; Led the Swedish army in the last years of the Napoleonic Wars (War of the Sixth Coalition) and in the Swedish–Norwegian War (1814).
	Charles XIII of Sweden	Sweden	King of Sweden (1809–1818); King of Norway (1814–1818)		Admiral	Led the Swedish fleet (albeit mostly just nominally) in the Russo-Swedish War (1788–1790).
	Arvid Lindman	Sweden	Prime Minister of Sweden (1906–191, 1928–1930)	1882–1892	Reserve Rear-Admiral	
	Tage Erlander	Sweden	Prime Minister of Sweden (1948–1968)		Reserve Lieutenant	
	Olof Palme	Sweden	Prime Minister of Sweden (1969–1976, 1982–1986)		Reserve Captain	
	Mustafa Kemal Atatürk	Ottoman Empire; Turkey	President of Turkey (1923–1938); Prime Minister of the Grand National Assembly (1920–1921)	1893–1919; 1921–1927	Major-General (Ottoman Empire); Marshal (Turkey)	Served in the Italo-Turkish War, Balkan Wars, World War I, and Turkish War of Independence.
	George VI of the United Kingdom	United Kingdom	King of the United Kingdom (1936–1952)	1913–1919	Squadron Leader; Admiral of the Fleet (as king)	Served in World War I.
	Elizabeth II of the United Kingdom	United Kingdom	Queen of the United Kingdom (1952–2022)	1945	Junior Commander	Served in World War II.
	Charles III of the United Kingdom	United Kingdom	King of the United Kingdom (2022–present)	1971–1976	Commander; Admiral of the Fleet (as Prince of Wales)	
	Arthur Wellesley, 1st Duke of Wellington	United Kingdom	Prime Minister of the United Kingdom (1828–1830, 1834)	1787–1852	Field Marshal	Served in the French Revolutionary Wars, Fourth Anglo-Mysore War, Maratha-Nizam War, Cotiote War, Second Anglo-Maratha War and the Napoleonic Wars, most notably at the Battle of Waterloo
	Winston Churchill	United Kingdom	Prime Minister of the United Kingdom (1940–1945, 1951–1955)	1893–1924	Lieutenant-Colonel	
	Clement Attlee	United Kingdom	Prime Minister of the United Kingdom (1945–1951)	1914–1919	Major	Served in World War I.
	Kiro Gligorov	Socialist Federal Republic of Yugoslavia	President of Macedonia (1991–1999)	1942–1945		Served in the Yugoslav partisans during World War II.
	Sinan Hasani	Socialist Federal Republic of Yugoslavia	President of the Presidency of Yugoslavia (1986–1987)	1941–1944		Served in the Yugoslav partisans during World War II.
	Lazar Koliševski	Socialist Federal Republic of Yugoslavia	President of the Presidency of Yugoslavia (1980)	1941–1980	Major-General	Served in the Yugoslav partisans during World War II.
	Lazar Mojsov	Socialist Federal Republic of Yugoslavia	President of the Presidency of Yugoslavia (1987–1988)	1941–1945		Served in the Yugoslav partisans during World War II.
	Sao Shwe Thaik	United Kingdom	President of Burma (1948–1952)			Served in World War I
	Josip Broz Tito	Austria-Hungary; Russian Soviet Federative Socialist Republic; Socialist Federal Republic of Yugoslavia	President of Yugoslavia (1953–1980); Prime Minister of Yugoslavia (1944–1963)	1913–1915; 1918–1920; 1941–1980	Marshal (as president)	Served in World War I and the Russian Civil War, led the Yugoslav partisans during World War II.
	Franjo Tuđman	Socialist Federal Republic of Yugoslavia; Croatia	President of Croatia (1990–1999)	1942–1961; 1995–1999		Served in the Yugoslav partisans during World War II, led Croatian forces during the Croatian War of Independence

== Oceania ==
Portrait	Name	Countries	Official position	Service	Rank in military	Notes
	Frank Bainimarama	Fiji	Prime Minister of Fiji (2014–2022)	1975–2014	Rear Admiral	

== Heads of state and government of unrecognized states ==
This list includes leaders of countries that were or are self-proclaimed as independent, but were or are neither members nor observers of the United Nations.

Portrait	Name	Countries	Official position	Service	Rank in military	Notes
	Hibatullah Akhundzada	Taliban	Supreme Leader of Afghanistan (2016–present)	until 1992; 1996–2001		Leader of the Taliban. Served during the Soviet–Afghan War, Afghan Civil War (1996–2001), and War in Afghanistan (2001–2021).
	Anatoly Bibilov	Soviet Union; South Ossetia; Russia	President of South Ossetia (2017–2022)	1988–2008	Lieutenant-General	
	Valery Bolotov	Soviet Union; Luhansk People's Republic	Head of the Luhansk People's Republic (2014)	1988–1990, 2014–2017	Senior Sergeant	
	Agim Çeku	Socialist Federal Republic of Yugoslavia; Croatia; Kosovo	Prime Minister of Kosovo (2006–2008)	before 1991–1999; 1999–2001		Served during the Croatian War of Independence and in the Kosovo Liberation Army during the Kosovo War.
	Chen Cheng	Republic of China; Taiwan	Premier of Taiwan (1950–1954, 1958–1963)	1924–1950	General	Served during the Northern Expedition, Chinese Civil War, and World War II.
	Chiang Ching-kuo	Republic of China; Taiwan	President of Taiwan (1978–1988); Premier of Taiwan (1972–1978)	1937–1968	General	
	Dzhokhar Dudayev	Soviet Union; Chechen Republic of Ichkeria	President of the Chechen Republic of Ichkeria (1991–1996)	1962–1990, 1991–1996	Major-General	Served in the Soviet–Afghan War and First Chechen War.
	Ramush Haradinaj	Kosovo	Prime Minister of Kosovo (2004–2005, 2017–2020)	1996–2000		Served in the Kosovo Liberation Army.
	Hau Pei-tsun	Republic of China; Taiwan	Premier of Taiwan (1990–1993)	1938–1989	Senior General	Served during the Chinese Civil War, World War II, and the Second Taiwan Strait Crisis.
	Vadim Krasnoselsky	Transnistria	President of Transnistria (2016–present)	1988–2012	Major-General	
	Lee Teng-hui	Empire of Japan	President of Taiwan (1988–2000)	1944–1945	Second Lieutenant	Served in World War II.
	Ma Ying-jeou	Taiwan	President of Taiwan (2008–2016)	1972–1974	Lieutenant	
	Aslan Maskhadov	Soviet Union; Chechen Republic of Ichkeria	President of the Chechen Republic of Ichkeria (1997–2005)	1972–2005	Colonel (Soviet Union)	Served in the First Chechen War and Second Chechen War.
	Mullah Omar	Afghan mujahideen Taliban	Supreme Leader of Afghanistan (1996–2005)	1979–1991, 1994–2013		Founder and leader of the Taliban. Served during the Soviet–Afghan War and Afghan Civil War (1992–1996).
	Igor Plotnitsky	Soviet Union; Luhansk People's Republic	Head of the Luhansk People's Republic (2014–2017)	1982–1991, 2014	Major	
	Bajram Rexhepi	Kosovo	Prime Minister of Kosovo (2002–2004)	1999		Served in the Kosovo Liberation Army during the Kosovo War.
	Tang Fei	Republic of China; Taiwan	Premier of Taiwan (2000)	1944–1999	Senior General	Served during the Third Taiwan Strait Crisis.
	Hashim Thaçi	Kosovo	President of Kosovo (2016–2020); Prime Minister of Kosovo (1999–2000, 2008–2014)	1993–1999		Served in the Kosovo Liberation Army during the Kosovo War.
	Yan Xishan	Republic of China; Taiwan	Premier of Taiwan (1949–1950)	1911–1949	General	Served during the Northern Expedition, Central Plains War, Chinese Civil War, and World War II.
	Alexander Zakharchenko	Donetsk People's Republic	Head of the Donetsk People's Republic (2014–2018)	2014–2018	Major-General	
