= Humberto Guillermo Cuestas =

Salvadoran politician

Vice President of El Salvador
- In office 1 July 1967 – 1 July 1972
- President: Fidel Sánchez Hernández
- Preceded by: Francisco Roberto Lima
- Succeeded by: Enrique Mayorga Rivas

Personal details
- Born: 3 February 1921 Santa Ana, El Salvador
- Died: April 2005 (aged 84)
- Party: National Conciliation Party
- Education: Lawyer

Humberto Guillermo Cuestas (3 February 1921 – April 2005) was a Salvadoran politician and Vice President of El Salvador from 1967 to 1972.

Cuestas was born on 3 February 1921 in Santa Ana. He was a lawyer by profession. He was Minister of Justice and private secretary during the presidency of colonel Julio Adalberto Rivera Carballo (1963-1967).

Cuestas was elected as Vice President of El Salvador in the 1967 elections, and served in the presidency of general Fidel Sánchez Hernández. He also held portfolios of Minister of Finance from 1967 to 1968, and also Minister of Interior and minister in the presidential office.

Later Cuestas was a magistrate in the Supreme Court of Justice of El Salvador. He died in April 2005.
