= 1977 Salvadoran presidential election =

- 20 February 1977
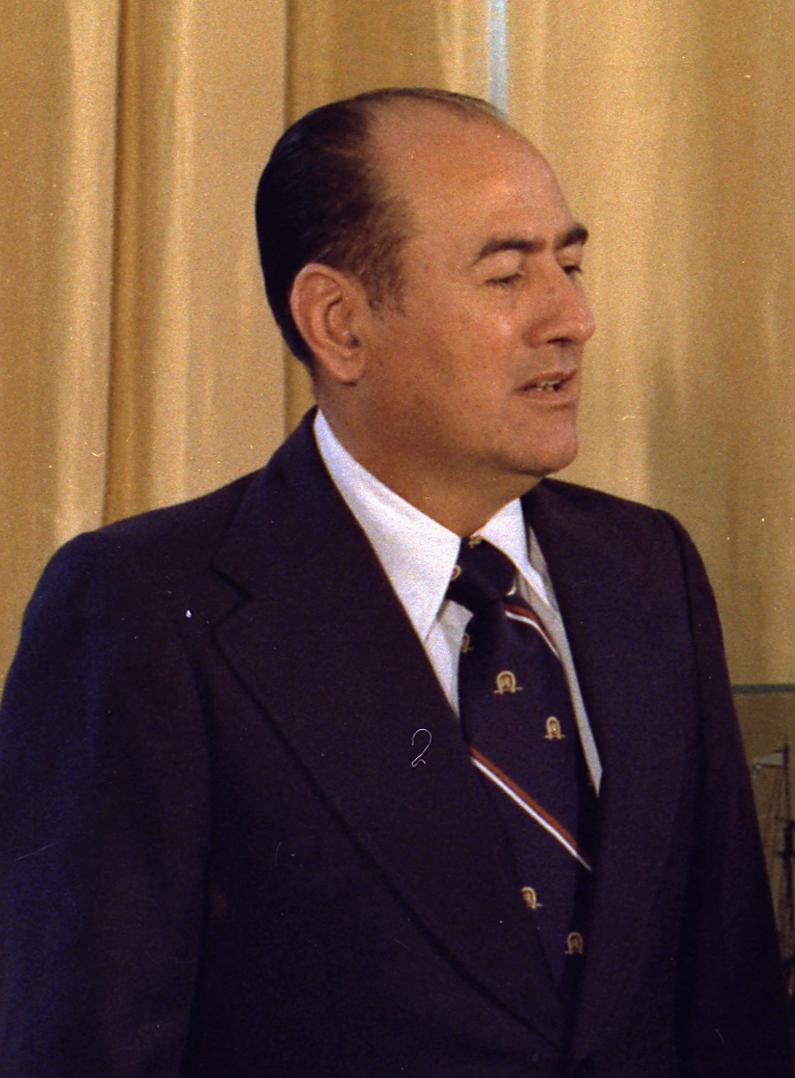
		UNO
Nominee	Carlos Humberto Romero	Ernesto Antonio Claramount Roseville
Party	PCN	UNO
Running mate	Julio Ernesto Astacio	José Antonio Morales Ehrlich
Popular vote	812,281	394,661
Percentage	67.30%	32.70%
President before election
Arturo Armando Molina
PCN
Elected President
Carlos Humberto Romero
PCN

Presidential elections were held in El Salvador on 20 February 1977.

The result was a victory for Carlos Humberto Romero of the National Conciliation Party (PCN), who received 67.3% of the vote. However, the election was characterized by massive fraud, with officials of the National Opposition Union (UNO, an alliance of the Christian Democratic Party, National Revolutionary Movement and Nationalist Democratic Union) intercepting military radio transmissions ordering ballot box stuffing, whilst their election officials were assaulted and ejected from polling stations. According to credible witnesses, in sixteen districts where an honest count was made, the UNO candidate, Ernesto Antonio Claramount Roseville, won around 75% of the vote.

== Results ==
Candidate	Party	Votes	%
Carlos Humberto Romero	National Conciliation Party	812,281	67.30
Ernesto Antonio Claramount Roseville	National Opposition Union	394,661	32.70
Total		1,206,942	100.00
Source: Nohlen

== Bibliography ==
- Byrne, Hugh. El Salvador's civil war: a study of revolution. Boulder: Lynne Rienner Publishers. (Excellent source of information on FMLN strategies, progression of the war, and impasse that led both sides to the peace agreement.). 1996.
- Caldera T., Hilda. Historia del Partido Demócrata Cristiano de El Salvador. Tegucigalpa: Instituto Centroamericano de Estudios Políticos. 1983.
- Political Handbook of the world, 1977. New York, 1978.
- Webre, Stephen. José Napoleón Duarte and the Christian Democratic Party in Salvadoran Politics 1960-1972. Baton Rouge: Louisiana State University Press. 1979.
