= Alfredo Martínez Moreno =

Salvadoran jurist (1923–2021)

Alfredo Martínez Moreno (1 September 1923 – 2 October 2021) was a Salvadoran diplomat, lawyer and jurist, president of the Supreme Court of Justice of El Salvador from 1968 to 1970, and director of the Academia Salvadoreña de la Lengua between 1969 and 2006. In 1967 he was also Minister of Foreign Affairs.

He was the only judge in the Supreme Court of Justice to oppose the execution of Victoriano Gómez Urrutia, who ultimately became the last person to be executed in El Salvador.
