= Federico Castillo Yanes =

Salvadoran military officer

General Federico Castillo Yanes

Minister of National Defense of El Salvador
- In office 1 July 1977 – 15 October 1979
- President: Carlos Humberto Romero
- Preceded by: Carlos Humberto Romero
- Succeeded by: José Guillermo García

Personal details
- Born: El Salvador
- Died: 13 April 2013 San Salvador, El Salvador
- Occupation: Military officer

Military service
- Allegiance: El Salvador
- Branch/service: Salvadoran Army
- Rank: General
- Battles/wars: 1979 Salvadoran coup d'état

Federico Castillo Yanes (died 13 April 2013) was a Salvadoran military officer who served as the Minister of National Defense of El Salvador from 1 July 1977 until his resignation on 15 October 1979.

== Biography ==
Federico Castillo Yanes was born in El Salvador and became officer in the Army.

He was appointed as Minister of National Defense by President Carlos Humberto Romero on 1 July 1977. He resigned and left for exile on 15 October 1979 following the overthrow of President Romero.

Castillo Yanes died in San Salvador, El Salvador, on 13 April 2013.

Political offices
Preceded by Carlos Humberto Romero	Minister of National Defense of El Salvador; 1977–1979	Succeeded by José Guillermo García (provisional)
