= Walter Béneke =

Salvadorean politologist

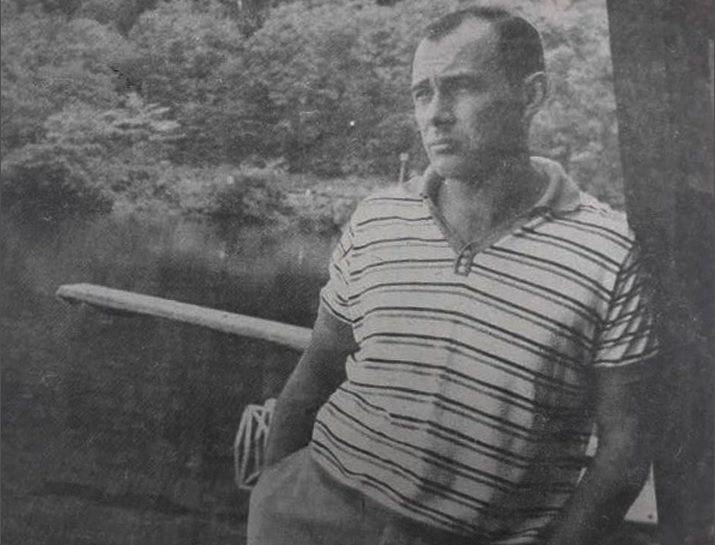

Minister of Foreign Affairs of El Salvador
- In office September 1971 – 30 June 1972
- Preceded by: Guillermo Paz Larín
- Succeeded by: Mauricio Borgonovo

Minister of Education of El Salvador
- In office 1 July 1967 – September 1971

Personal details
- Born: Carlos Walter Teodoro Béneke Medina; May 31, 1930 San Salvador, El Salvador
- Died: April 27, 1980 (aged 49) San Salvador, El Salvador
- Manner of death: Assassination (gunshot wound)

Carlos Walter Teodoro Béneke Medina (May 31, 1930 – April 27, 1980) was a Salvadoran politologist, economist, sociologist, journalist, and writer. He held various diplomatic positions and served as the head of the Ministry of Education and the Ministry of Foreign Affairs.

He is known for being at the forefront of the Educational Reform of 1968 and for being the promoter of the Televisión Educativa de El Salvador (Canal 10), under the presidential term of Fidel Sánchez Hernández.

In addition, he is the author of two national award-winning dramatic works: El paraíso de los imprudentes (1955) and Funeral Home (1958).

== Formation ==
Walter Béneke was born in 1930, in the cradle of an upper-middle-class landlord family. He is the son of Sara Medina de Béneke, who was president of the "Sociedad de Señoras de la Caridad" (Society of Ladies of Charity), which manages the San Vicente de Paul Homes for the Elderly; his father, on the other hand, was of German origin. He completed his secondary studies at the Jesuit school Externado de San José in San Salvador.

In the early 1950s, he traveled to Spain to study political science and economics at the Central University of Madrid. There he met the future El Salvador president Fidel Sánchez Hernández, who was doing his military studies at that time precisely in the city of Madrid. He continued training with courses in journalism and contemporary problems at the Menéndez Pelayo International University. During this time, Béneke dedicated himself to traveling through some European countries, such as France, Switzerland, Germany, Norway, Sweden, and Denmark, absorbing a great deal of knowledge of European culture.

=== Literature ===
In the mid-1950s, Walter Béneke returned to El Salvador to venture into the existentialist theatre. In 1955, he was the winner of the Floral Games of San Salvador for his work El paraíso de los imprudentes (1955) and in 1958 he would obtain first place in the theater branch of the IV National Culture Competition for Funeral Home (1958).

== Diplomatic and political life ==
Around 1955, Béneke was the secretary of the Salvadoran embassy in Germany. In the early 1960s he worked in the Ministry of Economy, and in 1961 was assigned as ambassador to Japan (1961-1966).

In Japan, Béneke was impressed by the way the Japanese government used television for educational purposes. In 1962, he then asked the Nippon Hōsō Kyōkai (Japan Broadcasting Company) to conduct a study on the possibility of implementing instructional television in El Salvador. The results of this study were revealed and showed that it was very favorable to carry out the project and invest in the equipment to achieve it. This rapprochement reinforced the international relationships between Japan and El Salvador.

A commission was created in 1963 to carry out this project but failed to take concrete actions. In 1964 an educational television department was created, but it had little budget and priority by the minister of education at that time. In 1966, Béneke left his position as ambassador and was assigned to head the Educational Television Commission of El Salvador. After several meetings, they agreed to implement the program with students from the third cycle of basic education, taking into account the search for financing for the project.

=== Minister of Education and Educational Reform of 1968 ===
Upon assuming the presidency in July 1967, Fidel Sánchez Hernández places Béneke in charge of the ministry of education, leading the implementation of the so-called Educational Reform of 1968.

The educational reform consisted of reorganizing the administration of the Ministry of Education, diversifying the curricula of secondary education, that is, diversifying the diversified baccalaureates to provide technical tools to students to integrate into the labor market and implement the educational television in the classrooms.

Nevertheless, by 1968, this reform had generated an opposition, led by the teachers' union, the National Association of Salvadoran Educators, whose strikes paralyzed the country's educational system.

=== Other charges ===
After serving as minister of education, in September 1971, he was reassigned to the position of minister of foreign affairs up to 1972. He was also director of the Central American Technological Institute and the Mortgage Bank of El Salvador; also, he was the secretary of the Embassy of El Salvador in Guatemala and ambassador of El Salvador in Austria.

== Assassination ==
Béneke was assassinated on April 27, 1980, outside his home in San Salvador. The suspect was hidden behind a tree outside his house, and when Béneke got out of his car he was wounded by a gunshot, then he walked a couple of meters and fell down in front of his house; the attacker escaped in a car that waited for him. It was never clarified the motive for the crime and who had been the perpetrator of his death. Béneke's funeral took place in the Corazón de María church in San Salvador.

== Plays ==
- El paraíso de los imprudentes (Ministry of Culture, Editorial Department, 1955)
- Funeral Home (Ministry of Culture, Editorial Department, 1958)

== Bibliography ==
- Arellano, Jorge Eduardo (May 15, 2003): ''Literatura Centroamericana, Diccionario de Autores Contemporáneos'. Colección Cultural de Centro América, Serie Literaria No., 12, Fundación VIDA, 2003. p-98-99. ISBN 9992453125.
