= Julio Astacio =

Salvadoran politician

Julio Ernesto Astacio López

Vice President of El Salvador
- In office 1 July 1977 – 15 October 1979
- President: Carlos Humberto Romero
- Preceded by: Enrique Mayorga Rivas
- Succeeded by: Jaime Abdul Gutiérrez (in 1980)

Personal details
- Born: 12 March 1932 (age 94) San Salvador, El Salvador
- Party: National Conciliation Party
- Education: Physician

Julio Ernesto Astacio López (born 12 March 1932) is a Salvadoran politician and physician and former Vice President of El Salvador from July 1977 to October 1979.

Astacio was born on 12 March 1932 in San Salvador. He got a medical degree from University of El Salvador in 1960.

Astacio worked as a physician in Pennsylvania and later had private practice. He was appointed as minister of health and social assistance in July 1972.

In September 1976, Astacio was selected as the vice presidential candidate of the ruling National Conciliation Party in the 1977 elections. He was elected as Vice President of El Salvador in the 1977 elections, and served in the presidency of general Carlos Humberto Romero. He held the additional cabinet portfolio of minister of public health. He was ousted in October 1979 in a coup d'état.
