= Enrique Mayorga Rivas =

Salvadoran politician

Vice President of El Salvador
- In office 1 July 1972 – 1 July 1977
- President: Arturo Armando Molina
- Preceded by: Humberto Guillermo Cuestas
- Succeeded by: Julio Ernesto Astacio

Personal details
- Born: 1 November 1926 San Salvador, El Salvador
- Died: April 1987 (aged 60)
- Party: National Conciliation Party
- Education: Lawyer

Enrique Mayorga Rivas (November 1, 1926– April 1987) was a Salvadoran politician and Vice President of El Salvador from 1972 to 1977.

Mayorga was born on 1 November 1926 in San Salvador. He studied law at the University of Salamanca, University of Barcelona, and University of Madrid. In 1958 he started academic work in the University of El Salvador. He was also secretary of the Institute of Hispanic Culture.

Mayorga was an official of the Consulate General of El Salvador in Barcelona from 1949 to 1952, and a member of the diplomatic staff in Madrid from 1952 to 1956. He was appointed as the secretary general of the Presidency of El Salvador in 1967. In 1970 he was elected as the first designate to the presidency. In the presidential elections of 1972, Mayorga was elected Vice President of El Salvador for the term 1972 to 1977 as the running mate of Arturo Armando Molina. In addition to vice presidential position, he was Minister of the Presidency.

He died in April 1987 after a heart attack.
