= 1975 Salvadoran student massacre =

1975 massacre in El Salvador

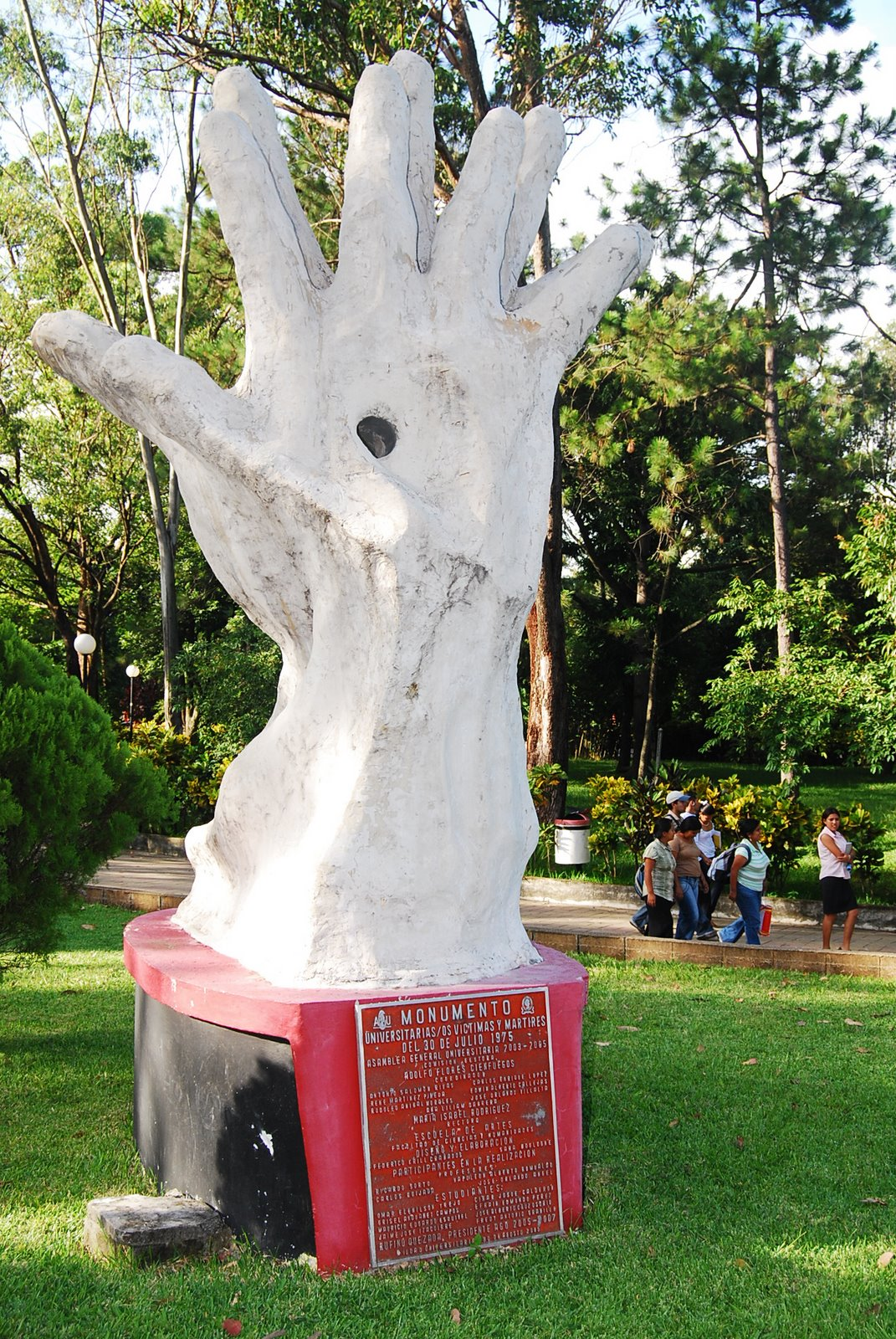
- A monument at the University of El Salvador honoring the massacre's victims
- Location: San Salvador, El Salvador
- Date: July 30, 1975
- Target: University and high school students
- Attack type: Massacre
- Deaths: 50–100
- Injuries: 25
- Perpetrators: Salvadoran Army; National Guard; Treasury Police

The 1975 Salvadoran student massacre occurred during the waning years of El Salvador's military dictatorships and was an important event in the buildup to the country's civil war. This massacre of an unknown number of student demonstrators was led by then-President Colonel Arturo Armando Molina and General Carlos Humberto Romero and took place in San Salvador, the country's capital, during the events of the Miss Universe beauty pageant.

== 1970s political context in El Salvador ==
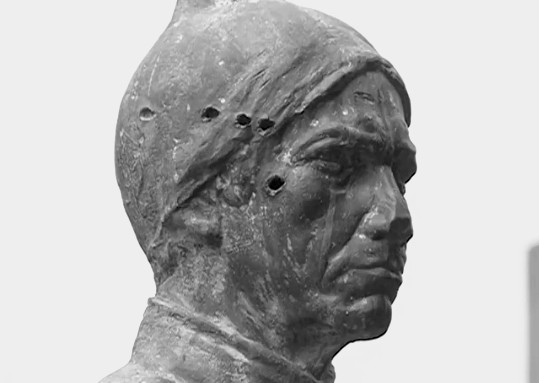
A bust of Crisanto Salazar, the first chancellor of UES, with bullet holes from the massacre still present

In the 1970s, students at the University of El Salvador (UES) overwhelmingly aligned themselves with the revolutionary left as a response to the escalating repression and despotism of the military governments in power. On July 19, 1972, the government of Colonel Arturo Armando Molina staged a military occupation of the main campus to suppress the student opposition, lasting until mid-1973. When the UES reopened, Molina began a smear campaign against the university, labelling it a center of Marxist indoctrination.

== Events of July 30, 1975 ==
On July 19, 1975, while television audiences from around the world watched the finale of the Miss Universe pageant in El Salvador, students in Santa Ana and San Salvador protested the government expenditure of 1 million colones ($114,393.10 USD in 2023) on the beauty contest during a context of great social inequality. Heavily armed troops were dispatched to stop the demonstrations, alleging that the protests were part of a wider Communist plot. As a result of these clashes with demonstrators, Colonel Molina's military government reported one death, five injuries and 11 arrests. However, according to students, at least 12 demonstrators were killed, along with 20 injuries and 40 arrests.

In the following days, the West Campus of the University of El Salvador was raided by the National Guard and the now-defunct Treasury Police and National Police. These raids included other human rights abuses committed by these same armed forces in the city of Santa Ana, the location of the West UES Campus.

To protest the repression, on July 30, 1975, around 2 p.m., a demonstration made up of UES and high school student activists left from the entrance of the School of Science and Humanities at the university's main campus in San Salvador.

Around 4:30 p.m., marchers were attacked by armed forces as the protest reached the overpass in front of the General Hospital of the Salvadoran Social Security Institute (ISSS), located on N 25th Ave in the country's capital. Officers threw tear gas canisters and opened fire on demonstrators, killing several on impact. Protesters were then trapped on the overpass by tanks positioned on either side. These began running over the wounded, and forced others to jump over the sides of the overpass into the traffic below and climb over the walls of the ISS to escape the violence.

The total number of losses is still undetermined, as security forces quickly blocked off the area after the massacre and removed the bodies, washing the blood off the streets with soap and water, according to witnesses.

== Aftermath ==
La Prensa Gráfica, one of the country's main dailies, reported seven deaths among the university students. However, more conservative local newspapers reported only ten injured state forces. Contemporary figures place the total number of casualties between 50 and 100.

Those accused of ordering the student massacre were then-Salvadoran Minister of Defense and Public Safety, General Carlos Humberto Romero, who would become President of El Salvador two years later, and Colonel Arturo Armando Molina, who was president at the time. Neither faced charges in connection with the July 30 incident. In 2020, a group of survivors asked the Attorney General of El Salvador to investigate a dossier of 60 human rights violations committed during the events of July 30.

The July 30 Massacre radicalized El Salvador's urban leftist activists, prompting the creation of the militant, student-led People's Revolutionary Bloc, and of armed groups such as the Farabundo Martí Popular Liberation Forces. These would go on to become key players in the country's civil war, which fully erupted in 1980, slightly less than five years after the student massacre.

== See also ==
- History of El Salvador
- Salvadoran Civil War
- List of massacres in El Salvador
