= 1972 Salvadoran coup attempt =

Coup attempt in El Salvador

| Date | 25–26 March 1972 |
| Location | El Salvador |
| Result | Coup attempt suppressed |

Belligerents
| Military dictatorship; Armed Forces (loyalists); Guatemala; Nicaragua | Armed Forces (rebels) |

Commanders and leaders
| Fidel Sánchez; Arturo Molina | José Duarte; Benjamin Mejía |

Casualties and losses
- 200 dead

The 1972 Salvadoran coup attempt occurred from 25 to 26 March 1972 when young military officers attempted to overthrow the government of Fidel Sánchez Hernández, prevent the presidency of Arturo Armando Molina, and proclaim José Napoleón Duarte as President of El Salvador. The coup was suppressed and its leaders were exiled from the country.

== Background ==
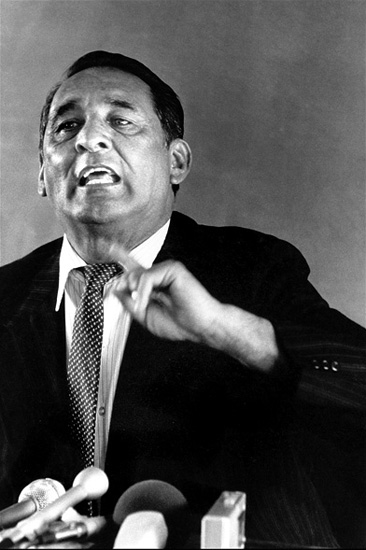
José Napoleón Duarte

The 1972 Salvadoran presidential election was scheduled for 20 February 1972. The ruling National Conciliation Party (PCN) selected Colonel Arturo Armando Molina as its candidate for the election while the National Opposition Union (UNO), a coalition of the Christian Democratic Party, the National Revolutionary Movement, and the Nationalist Democratic Union, selected José Napoleón Duarte as its candidate.

The election of 1972 was compared to the 1970 Chilean presidential election where socialist candidate Salvador Allende was elected as President of Chile. The ruling military dictatorship was concerned about the influence of the Communist Party of El Salvador (PCES) and the Catholic Church in national politics and they believed that Duarte and other members of UNO had communist sympathies.

On election day, the PCN expected to win the election, but Duarte over-performed in San Salvador and offset the PCN's rural stronghold. Poll watchers claimed the final vote tally to count 327,000 votes for Duarte and 318,000 votes for Molina. The government suspended the results of the election and instructed the Legislative Assembly to elect the President. The PCN had an overwhelming majority in the Legislative Assembly and elected Molina as president on 25 February, effectively canceling the election.

== Coup ==
The Military Youth of El Salvador did not approve of the result of the election and attempted to revert the decision of the Legislative Assembly. On the morning of 25 March, Colonel Benjamin Mejía declared that the Military Youth was in rebellion, including the Artillery Regiment and the barracks of San Carlos and El Zapote, and announced the establishment of the Revolutionary Junta. The Revolutionary Junta intended to install Duarte as President of El Salvador, deposing incumbent President Fidel Sánchez Hernández whose term would expire on 1 July. Sánchez Hernández was taken hostage by the Military Youth, but they had failed to gather the support of the rest of the Armed Forces of El Salvador. The Salvadoran Air Force began bombing the capital and rebel positions, and although there were some protestors in favor of the rebels, there were more protesting in favor of the government. Duarte made a radio broadcast at noon calling for civilians to evacuate San Salvador, but his broadcast failed to evoke a reaction from the citizens. Duarte sought refuge in the Venezuelan embassy in San Salvador but he was eventually captured by the National Security Agency of El Salvador (ANSESAL) after they broke into the embassy. The coup failed by the next day.

== Aftermath ==
After the coup, Duarte was tortured and exiled to Guatemala, and later to Venezuela. Mejía was exiled and later assassinated in 1981 by forces of the Revolutionary Government Junta. Molina assumed office on 1 July and would rule the nation until 1977 when he was succeeded by Carlos Humberto Romero.

== See also ==
- 1979 Salvadoran coup d'état

== Bibliography ==
- Bosch, Brian J. (1999). The Salvadoran Officer Corps and the Final Offensive of 1981. Jefferson, North Carolina, and London: McFarland & Company Incorporated Publishers (published 2013). ISBN 0-7864-0612-7.
- Nohlen, Dieter (2005). Elections in the Americas: A Data Handbook. Vol. I. ISBN 978-0-19-928357-6.
- Federal Research Division Library of Congress (1990). Haggerty, Richard A. (ed.). El Salvador: A Country Study (PDF). Washington, D.C.: The Library of Congress.
