= Capital punishment in Burkina Faso =

Capital punishment in Burkina Faso has been abolished. In late May 2018, the National Assembly of Burkina Faso adopted a new penal code that omitted the death penalty as a sentencing option, thereby abolishing the death penalty for all crimes.

Before the abolition of capital punishment in 2018, capital punishment had been abolished de facto, as the country had carried out its last executions in 1989.

In December 2025, the government of Ibrahim Traoré endorsed a draft bill to restore the death penalty.

== History ==
=== Methods and statutes ===
A 1965 report on worldwide death penalty usage reported that Burkina Faso (then known as the Republic of Upper Volta) utilized beheading as their sole method of execution, had not carried out any executions between 1958 and 1962, mandated that all executions be carried out in private rather than in public, and only handed down death sentences to convicts over 18 years of age. However, Burkina Faso's last official method of execution was the firing squad. The four most recent executions in Burkina Faso were carried out by firing squad.

In 1965, Burkina Faso permitted the death penalty following conviction of arson, espionage, murder, treason, crimes against the country's integrity/independence, infanticide, insurrection or rebellion, looting during war or a national emergency, parricide, perjury leading to conviction and execution in a capital case, poisoning, and sabotage. By 2010, but before Burkina Faso removed the death penalty as a sentencing option, their penal code permitted the death penalty for murder, treason, and attempted murder of a paternal relative. Despite the death penalty being a sentencing option, it was more common for convicts of those crimes to receive penalties mandating imprisonment rather than the death penalty.

=== Public opinion ===
In 1997, a poll surveying public opinion on the death penalty found that 54 percent of Burkinabè citizens were opposed to the death penalty.

=== Recent developments ===
On 19 September 1989, Burkina Faso carried out its final executions when the nation executed four leaders accused of an attempted coup d'état to depose President Blaise Compaoré – Defense Minister Jean-Baptiste Boukary Lingani, Minister of Economic Promotion Henri Zongo, and two unidentified men who, unlike Lingani and Zongo, were not high-ranking elected officials – after the four were suspected of treason. Lingani and Zongo were two of Compaoré's senior-most government officials. The failed coup had taken place the night before the executions, and Lingani, Zongo, and the two unidentified men were summarily executed afterwards without facing a trial. The four were put to death by firing squad in Burkina Faso's capital of Ouagadougou.

Following the executions, Secretary of State for Mining and Junior Minister Jean Yado Toe was arrested alongside Soumaila Keita, a former councilman on the National Revolutionary Council that had ruled under Thomas Sankara, Compaore's predecessor. Toe and Keita were arrested following the formation of a probe to investigate the coup attempt, although they were not executed.

In 1996, Burkina Faso adopted a new criminal code including the death penalty as a potential sentence, although the death penalty was never used after the adoption of the new criminal code.

In 2015, the country saw a landmark trial regarding another failed coup attempt, in which more than eighty people faced the death penalty if they were convicted by a military tribunal.

== Abolition ==
In 1999, Burkina Faso became a signatory to the International Covenant on Civil and Political Rights, but at that time, they did not ratify the ICCPR's Second Optional Protocol to abolish the death penalty.

In the decades preceding abolition, Burkina Faso's government received pressure from human rights organizations, including Amnesty International, as well as activists from the Catholic Church, to abolish the death penalty. In 2007, 2008, 2010, 2012, 2014, 2016, and 2018, Burkina Faso voted in favor of the seven United Nations General Assembly Resolutions for a death penalty moratorium, and in 2018, Burkina Faso was a co-sponsor to the Resolution for a moratorium, participated in the Universal Periodic Review of the United Nations Human Rights Council, and supported the United Nations' recommendations to fully abolish the death penalty. Prior, in 2014, the UN Committee Against Torture recommended Burkina Faso accede to the ICCPR's Second Optional Protocol, and in 2016, the United Nations Human Rights Committee made the same recommendation.

On 31 May 2018, the National Assembly of Burkina Faso adopted a new penal code which did not permit the imposition of the death penalty for any ordinary crimes, in effect abolishing capital punishment. They were also in the process of drafting a new Constitution which would formally and permanently abolish capital punishment. Following the adoption of the new penal code, the Director of Amnesty International Burkina Faso, Yves Traoré, praised the decision, saying, "While the country has been abolitionist in practice for many years, this parliamentary decision is a welcome move," and noted that Amnesty International unconditionally opposes the death penalty.

Despite having in effect abolished the death penalty five years prior, and despite recommendations from the United Nations and human rights organizations, as of 5 April 2023, Burkina Faso had not ratified the ICCPR's Second Optional Protocol.
