= Victoriano Gómez Urrutia =

Salvadoran murderer (1943–1971)

- Image of Gómez Urrutia from La Prensa Gráfica (1971)
- Born: 1943; El Volcán, San Miguel Department, El Salvador
- Died: 8 February 1971 (aged 27–28) (Note: The Costa Rican newspaper La República reported the execution with a note dated on 1 February 1971, although most other sources claim it to have taken place on 8 February 1971.); San Miguel, El Salvador
- Occupation: Field laborer
- Status: Executed by firing squad (public execution)
- Criminal charge: Murder ×2
- Penalty: Death

Details
- Victims: María Villegas and her underage daughter (Note: The Costa Rican source of La República cites the name of the elder victim as Magdalena Vargas.)

Victoriano Gómez Urrutia (1943 – 8 February 1971) was a Salvadoran suspected serial killer and child rapist who became the last person to be executed in El Salvador. He was put to death in a public execution by firing squad for the murder of a woman and her daughter in San Miguel Department. (Note: Gómez Urrutia confessed to two murders moments before his execution, though he claimed that he killed those two men in separate incidents of self-defense.)

== Background and case ==
Gómez Urrutia was born in 1943 in El Volcán, a small district in San Miguel Department. He was born into an extremely poor family supported by his mother Isabel Urrutia and had another brother and three sisters. The family worked in the countryside without having access to education or to basic needs. Gómez Urrutia became a field laborer in the proximities of the Chaparrastique volcano, working in coffee plantations and earning a salary that did not cover most of his needs.

At the age of 18, Gómez Urrutia killed a man, allegedly in self-defense. He additionally confessed to killing another man in the west of the country who he said attempted to hurt him. Some years before the murders, he had raped a girl, a crime for which the child's grandfather attacked him with a machete, cutting off a piece of his nose. Before committing the double murder of María Villegas and her daughter, Gómez Urrutia had already spent time in prison in Honduras and had stopped working in coffee plantations; he took up banditry as a way of living and secluded himself in the mountains and the rural areas of San Miguel Department.

On 29 January 1961, 18-year-old Gómez Urrutia broke into the home of rural worker María Villegas and her underage daughter in the San Andrés cantón of San Miguel. He murdered the woman and the girl, stealing the extremely low sum of 30 colones from the house. Gómez Urrutia subsequently escaped from the crime scene and managed to evade capture for several years.

By the time of Gómez Urrutia's capture in the early 1970s, El Salvador was convulsed by violence and state repression committed by the government of President Fidel Sánchez Hernández. After his arrest, Gómez Urrutia was described by the authorities as a guerrilla member and was tried by a military court in San Miguel. He was accused of the 1961 murders of Villegas and her daughter.

== Trial and execution ==
Polish journalist Ryszard Kapuściński described the context of Gómez Urrutia's trial and execution in his 1975 book Christ With a Rifle on His Shoulder. The court quickly found Gómez Urrutia guilty on both counts and sentenced him to death.

Gómez Urrutia appealed the verdict to the Supreme Court of Justice. The judges, except for the president of the court, Alfredo Martínez Moreno, rejected his appeal and upheld the death sentence. Martínez Moreno argued that Gómez Urrutia had no criminal background and that the military court had not heard his arguments that another man had instigated him to commit the crimes nor had called Francisca Centeno, an alleged witness who could have verified Gómez Urrutia's claims. (Note: The man accused by Gómez Urrutia was Efraín Urrutia, unrelated to him, and who had been killed the day after the murders in 1961.)

In his defense, Gómez Urrutia told Costa Rican newspaper La República in the minutes preceding his execution, that he had not murdered the woman and her daughter, instead saying that a man named Efraín Urrutia had committed the killings and that Ezequías Segovia, husband and father of the victims, had killed Urrutia himself the day after the murders.

On 8 February 1971, more than ten years after the killings, Gómez Urrutia, then aged 28, was publicly executed by a firing squad in San Miguel in front of hundreds of people who attended the proceedings. He maintained his innocence until the end and was accompanied by two Catholic priests, Father Octavio Coll and Father Alejandro Morán, who delivered him with spiritual guidance during his last moments. His mother and his friends and his son were allowed to attend his execution, with Kapuściński describing the woman as an extremely vulnerable and poor peasant. The execution was broadcast on national television. After several shots were fired, lieutenant Francisco Mena Vázquez approached Gómez Urrutia and shot him with a .45 pistol, delivering a coup de grâce.

Following the execution, Isabel Urrutia chastised reporters and journalists, alleging that they had contributed to her son's death by making up stories about him, falsely accusing him of committing crimes. Gómez Urrutia's three sisters wept alongside their mother in the moments after the execution of their brother. Another witness to the proceedings was Gómez Urrutia's 12-year-old son, Víctor, who did not show emotions during the execution of his father.

Gómez Urrutia was the last prisoner to be put to death by El Salvador. The death penalty in the country was abolished for civil crimes in 1983.

== See also ==
- List of most recent executions by jurisdiction
