= Fabio Castillo Figueroa =

Salvadoran politician (1921–2012)

Fabio Castillo Figueroa (10 March 1921 – 4 November 2012) was a Salvadoran politician who was a member of the Junta of Government, which ruled the country from 26 October 1960 until 25 January 1961. He later ran as a presidential candidate in 1967. He was a grandson of Salvadoran president General Fernando Figueroa.

Castillo Figueroa died on 4 November 2012, at the age of 91.
