= Victoriano G. de Ysasi =

Spanish wine merchant

Victoriano de Ysasi
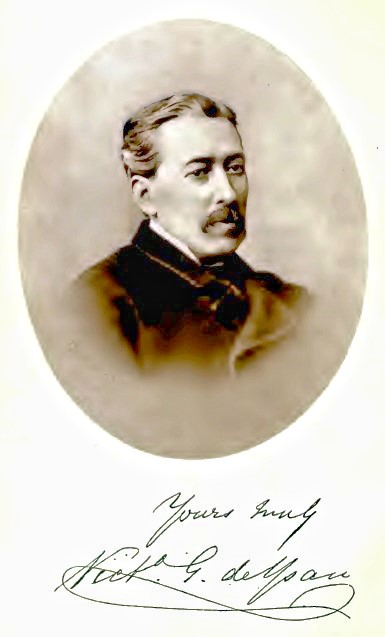
- Born: c. 1816; Málaga, Spain
- Died: 8 August 1881 (aged 64–65); Blackburn, England
- Occupation: Wine merchant
- Spouse: Clara Ransome Wilkins
- Relatives: Rafael de Ysasi Ransome, Manuel de Ysasi, Alfred Newman Gilbey

Victoriano Gregorio de Ysasi Jáuregui (c. 1816 – 8 August 1881) was a Spanish wine merchant and philatelist resident in London. He was an early member of the Philatelic Society, London, later the Royal Philatelic Society London. Shortly before his death, major parts of his collection of the stamps of Spain and its colonies were acquired by Thomas Tapling. He died from injuries received in a railway accident at Blackburn while waiting in a carriage at a railway station when a connecting train failed to stop in time.

== Early life ==
Victoriano Gregorio de Ysasi Jáuregui was born in Málaga, Spain, around 1816, into a well-known Andalusian family of Basque descent, active in the Sherry and Malaga wine trade. He moved to London in 1847 to learn the English side of the trade and took a post as a partner in the firm of his cousin Manuel de Ysasi who traded as Ysasi & Co. at 5 Water Lane Tower Street.

== Career ==
De Ysasi traded as a wine merchant in London, and set up his own firm of G. V. de Ysasi & Co. He married Clara Ransome of King's Lynn in 1862 at Islington, and they had five children: Victoriano, Manuel, Teresa, Rafael de Ysasi Ransome and Margarita. At the time of his death, his address was given as 5 Water Lane, a street on the edge of the River Thames, in the City of London.

In the 1870s, until the time of his death, he lived at 39 Brondesbury Villas, Kilburn.

== Philately ==
De Ysasi was one of the earliest members of The Philatelic Society, London, and became its vice president in May 1880. He knew Edward Stanley Gibbons, founder of the eponymous firm, and supplied him with stamps of Spain and its colonies such as Cuba, Fernando Po, the Philippines, and Puerto Rico. In return Gibbons gave him any relevant rarities that he came across.

Around 1873, he read a paper to the London society that was translated from an original by Mariano Pardo de Figueroa, also known as "Dr Thebussem". The paper was printed and distributed to members in 1873 as Obliteration Marks, Mata-Sellos, on Spanish Stamps and is the first publication of The Philatelic Society, London.

He was in the habit of describing his stamps as his "grandchildren", and had assembled a nearly complete collection of the stamps of Spain and its colonies that he was in the process of selling, much of which was acquired by Thomas Tapling, when he died unexpectedly.

== Death ==
On 8 August 1881, De Ysasi was injured in a railway accident at Blackburn while waiting in a carriage at the railway station when a connecting train failed to stop in time. He died shortly afterwards at the Blackburn Infirmary. He was buried at St Mary's Catholic Cemetery at Kensal Green. His will was proved by Joseph Leopold Rosenheim, a cotton merchant in Liverpool and former wine merchant. De Ysasi left an estate of £11,809.
