= Capital punishment in El Salvador =

Capital punishment is a legal penalty in El Salvador. It was abolished in 1983 by Article 27 of the constitution, with an exception allowed for crimes committed under military law during a state of international war. Because of this, El Salvador is one of seven countries considered "Abolitionist for Ordinary Crimes," along with Brazil, Burkina Faso, Chile, Guatemala, Israel, and Peru. El Salvador last carried out an execution in 1971, when it publicly executed convicted double murderer Victoriano Gómez Urrutia.

El Salvador acceded to the Second Optional Protocol to the International Covenant on Civil and Political Rights on April 8, 2014, with a reservation for crimes under military law committed during wartime. El Salvador voted in favor of the United Nations moratorium on the death penalty in 2007, 2008, 2010, 2012, 2014, 2016, 2018, and most recently, in 2020.
