= Ernesto Antonio Claramount Roseville =

Salvadoran politician and military officer

Colonel Ernesto Claramount
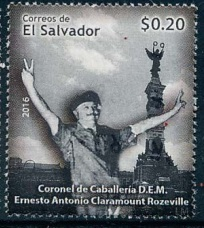
- Born: Ernesto Antonio Claramount Roseville; 1924; Delgado, El Salvador
- Died: 19 June 2008 (aged 83–84) El Salvador
- Allegiance: El Salvador
- Branch: Salvadoran Air Force
- Rank: Colonel
- Conflicts: Football War

Ernesto Antonio Claramount Rozeville (1924 – 19 June 2008) was a Salvadoran politician and military officer.

== Life ==
Claramount Rozeville was the son of Blanca Rozeville and General Antonio Claramount Lucero (13 June 1886 – 25 July 1975). A pilot, he attended the Captain General Gerardo Barrios Military School. In the 1940s, he attended the Cavalry School of Mexican Army. In July 1969, he participated in the Football War.

The National Opposition Union (UNO) selected him as its presidential candidate for the 1977 presidential election, with José Antonio Morales Ehrlich, the former mayor of San Salvador, as his vice presidential candidate. Protests against fraud in the Plaza de Libertad in San Salvador and suppressed the demonstration with about 100 victims.

The government continued Claramount an ultimatum: to be arrested by the military, or leave the country under house arrest. According voluntarily, he was taken with an air force plane to Costa Rica.

Allegedly, Claramount Rozeville was invited in May 1979 in Costa Rica by Constitutionalistas in FAES, placing itself at the top of a coup.

== In film ==
In the 1989 film Romero, Claramount Rozeville is played by Juan Pelaez.

== Legacy ==
On 22 December 2008 the creation of a foundation with his name (Fundacion de Coronel Caballeria D.E.M. Ernesto Antonio Claramount Rozeville) was announced. He was buried in the Monte Elena Complejo Funerario cemetery in Antiguo Cuscatlán, La Libertad.
