= Ministry of Labor (El Salvador) =

Ministry of Labor and Social Welfare
- Ministerio de Trabajo y Previsión Social
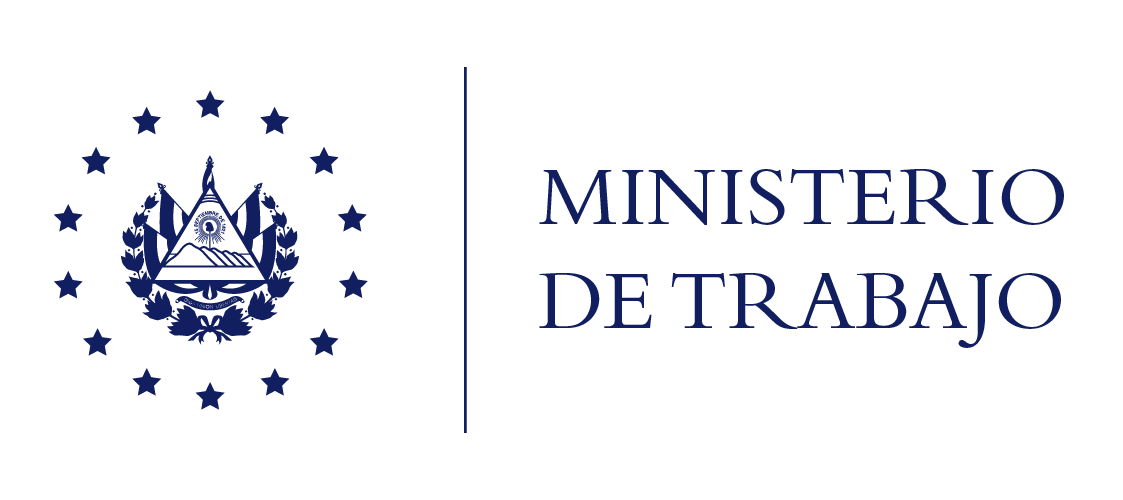

Agency overview
- Jurisdiction: El Salvador
- Headquarters: Alameda Juan Pablo II and 17th Ave. North, Buildings 2, 3, and 4, Government Center, San Salvador, El Salvador, CA
- Minister responsible: Oscar Rolando Castro
- Website: https://www.mtps.gob.sv/

The Ministry of Labor and Social Welfare of El Salvador (Spanish: Ministerio de Trabajo y Previsión Social) is a government ministry of El Salvador. The Ministry is the government body responsible for developing, executing, and overseeing the country’s labor and social policies.
