= Arturo Armando Molina =

President of El Salvador from 1972 to 1977

Colonel Arturo Armando Molina
- Molina c. 1972–1977

33rd President of El Salvador
- In office 1 July 1972 – 1 July 1977
- Vice President: Enrique Mayorga Rivas
- Preceded by: Fidel Sánchez Hernández
- Succeeded by: Carlos Humberto Romero

Deputy of the Legislative Assembly of El Salvador from San Salvador
- In office 1 May 1970 – 1 July 1972

Personal details
- Born: 6 August 1927 San Salvador, El Salvador
- Died: 18 July 2021 (aged 93) Los Angeles, California, U.S.
- Party: National Conciliation Party
- Spouse: María Elena Contreras
- Education: Captain General Gerardo Barrios Military School
- Occupation: Politician, military officer

Military service
- Allegiance: El Salvador
- Branch/service: Salvadoran Army
- Rank: Colonel

Arturo Armando Molina Barraza (6 August 1927 – 18 July 2021) was a Salvadoran politician and military officer, who served as President of El Salvador from 1972 to 1977.

He was born in San Salvador. He served between 1 July 1972 and 1 July 1977. The 1973 oil crisis led to rising food prices and decreased agricultural output. This worsened the existent socioeconomic inequality in the country, leading to increased unrest. In response, Molina enacted a series of land reform measures, calling for large landholdings to be redistributed among the peasant population.

Molina was distrusted by the oligarchy and the right-wing military, and was resented by the opposition from whom he had stolen power. His attempts to silence opposition included the military occupation of the University of El Salvador in 1972, as well as violently suppressing student protests that erupted after public funds were used to hold the Miss Universe contest in San Salvador. He also oversaw assassinations of priests in the country. His regime saw extreme polarization and violence in the country. His tenure ended in 1977, and then he left the country. Molina returned to El Salvador in 1992.

He died on 18 July 2021 in California, at the age of 93.

== See also ==
- 1972 Salvadoran coup attempt

Political offices
Preceded by Fidel Sánchez	President of El Salvador; 1972–1977	Succeeded by Carlos Humberto Romero
