= Final offensive of 1981 (El Salvador) =

1981 rebel offensive of the Salvadoran Civil War

- Part of the Salvadoran Civil War and the Cold War
Date	10–26 January 1981; (2 weeks and 2 days)
Location	El Salvador
Result	Government victory

Belligerents
Revolutionary Government Junta; Supported by: United States; Honduras	Farabundo Martí National Liberation Front; Supported by: Nicaragua; Cuba

Commanders and leaders
José Napoleón Duarte; Jaime Abdul Gutiérrez; José Guillermo García	Schafik Hándal; Cayetano Carpio; Fermán Cienfuegos

Strength
13,000–20,000 soldiers	2,500–5,000 soldiers

Casualties and losses
122 dead; 195 wounded	500–1,000+ dead; Unknown wounded

The final offensive of 1981 (Spanish: ofensiva final de 1981), also known as the general offensive of 1981 (Spanish: ofensiva general de 1981), was the unsuccessful first military offensive conducted by the Farabundo Martí National Liberation Front (FMLN) during the Salvadoran Civil War. The objective of the offensive was to initiate a popular revolution to overthrow the Revolutionary Government Junta (JRG), which had been ruling the country since the 1979 Salvadoran coup d'état. The FMLN hoped that the government would be overthrown by 20 January 1981; the date Ronald Reagan was to be inaugurated as president of the United States.

During the first phase of the offensive from 10 to 17 January, the FMLN carried out attacks across northern and western El Salvador, incited a general strike across the nation, a military mutiny in the second largest city, Santa Ana, and secured several important cities and villages. During the second phase from 18 to 26 January, the FMLN began, what they termed, a "temporary tactical retreat" as government forces began to recapture previously lost territory. The offensive ended in a military defeat for the FMLN, but it solidified the group as an effective fighting force.

== Background ==
On 15 October 1979, the Armed Forces of El Salvador (FAES) overthrew President Carlos Humberto Romero and established the joint military and civilian Revolutionary Government Junta (JRG), ending 48 years of exclusive military dictatorship in the country. The 1979 Salvadoran coup d'état, which was covertly supported by the United States, is often considered the beginning of the Salvadoran Civil War. The junta, (also known as the "First Junta"), was dissolved on 9 January 1980; when the three civilian members were removed and replaced by three new civilian members, beginning the Second Junta.

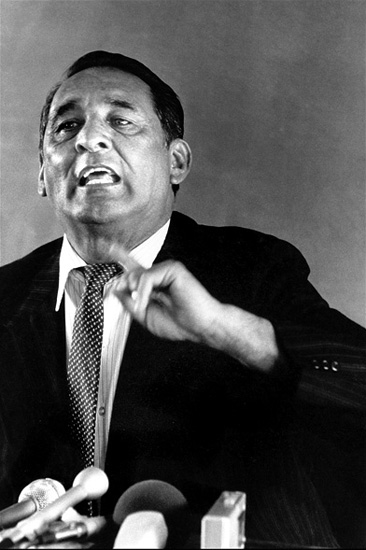
José Napoleón Duarte, president of the Revolutionary Government Junta during the final offensive.

Beginning in 1980, leftist guerrilla activity was to become one of the biggest threats to the JRG: the government detected signs of a classic guerrilla insurgency developing. With small attacks by leftist rebels, using only light arms, who did not hold the territory they captured. According to United States Marine Corps Colonel Ronald J. Cruz—a former naval attaché to El Salvador—in the first six months of 1980, guerrillas committed around 3,140 acts of violence, including arson, assassinations, and destruction of infrastructure. The guerrillas initially funded themselves with kidnappings and robbing banks, but in late-1980, the guerrillas began to receive modern weaponry from Nicaragua.

On 10 October 1980, five left-wing groups, the Farabundo Martí Popular Liberation Forces (FPL), Communist Party of El Salvador (PCES), National Resistance (RN), People's Revolutionary Army (ERP), and the Revolutionary Party of the Central American Workers (PRTC), joined forces and formed the Farabundo Martí National Liberation Front (FMLN) guerrilla coalition. The group was named after Farabundo Martí, a leader of the Communist Party of El Salvador who was executed during La Matanza, the 1932 massacre of 10,000–40,000 indigenous and communist peasants in western El Salvador; following a failed peasant revolt against military President Maximiliano Hernández Martínez.

On 13 December 1980, the Second Junta was dissolved after Colonel Adolfo Arnoldo Majano was forced to resign his position, and the Third Junta was formed with the four remaining members: President José Napoleón Duarte, Vice President Colonel Jaime Abdul Gutiérrez, José Ramón Ávalos Navarrete, and José Antonio Morales Ehrlich. Later that month, on 27 December 1980, Fermán Cienfuegos, the commander of the Armed Forces of National Resistance (FARN), the militant wing of National Resistance, announced that a "final offensive" would be launched by the FMLN against the JRG before the inauguration of Ronald Reagan as president of the United States on 20 January 1981. The guerrillas conducted operations and preparations for the "final offensive" in December 1980 and January 1981. The Army captured pamphlets calling on the rural poor to join the FMLN and operational plans that confirmed the guerrillas were planning an offensive: specific targets were not mentioned and remained unknown to the government. As a result, the High Command General Staff, consisting of Colonels Gutiérrez, José Guillermo García, Rafael Flores Lima, and Francisco Adolfo Castillo, placed the military on a "state of alert" in preparation for such an offensive.

== Order of battle ==
=== Government forces ===
In the 1970s, with the rise of left-wing militant groups in El Salvador and after the very brief Football War against Honduras in 1969, the Salvadoran government structured the Army to plan and prepare for counter-insurgency operations. By the beginning of the offensive, the Army was already on a counter-insurgency footing.

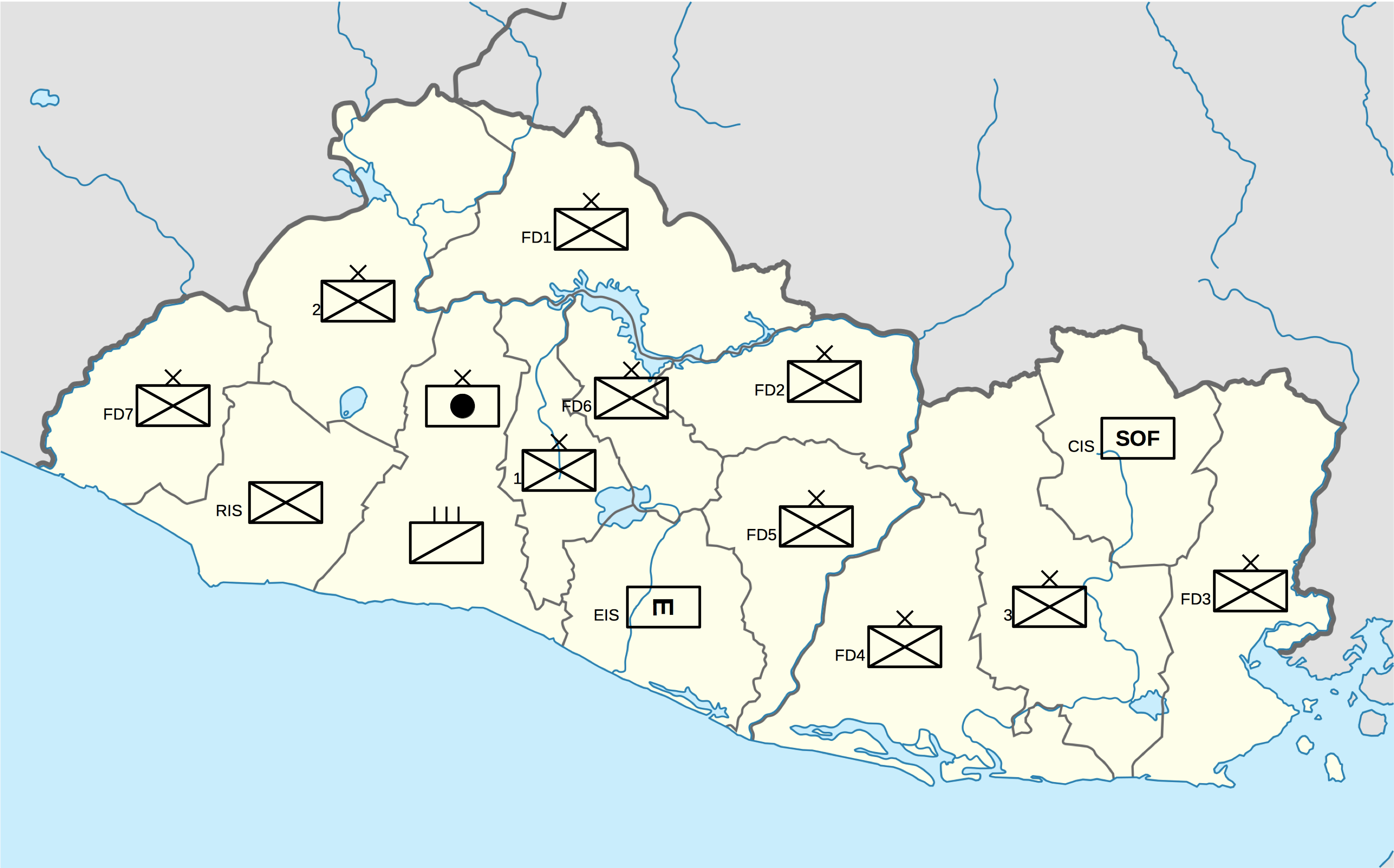
Map of the Salvadoran Army's positions at the start of the offensive. Locations are not exact.

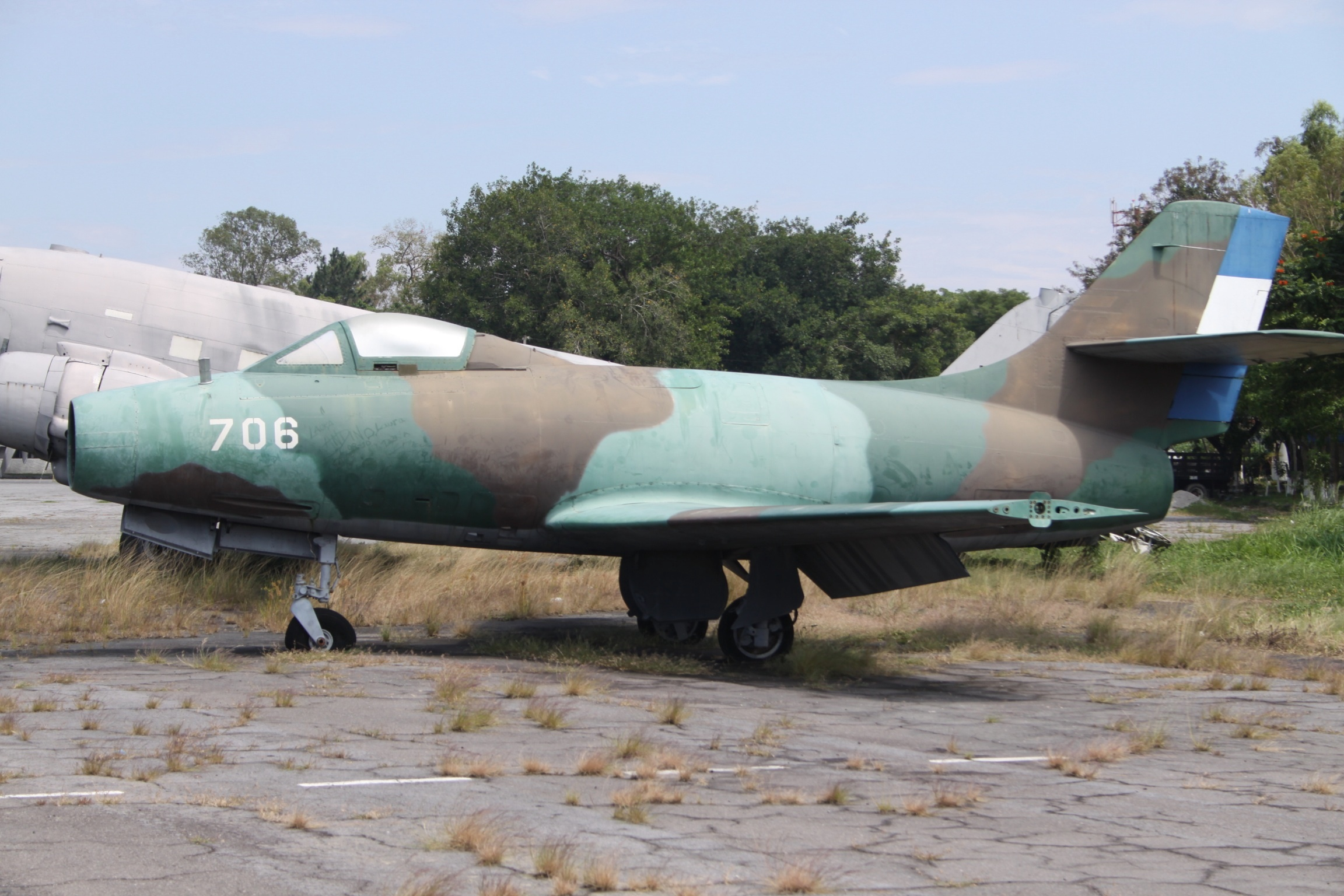
A Salvadoran Dassault Ouragan.

At the beginning of the offensive, the Salvadoran Army comprised three infantry brigades, seven frontier detachments, an artillery brigade, and a cavalry regiment, along with several training centers. They were located as follows:

- 1st Infantry Brigade (San Salvador)
- 2nd Infantry Brigade (Santa Ana)
- 3rd Infantry Brigade (San Miguel)
- Frontier Detachment 1 (Chalatenango)
- Frontier Detachment 2 (Cabañas)
- Frontier Detachment 3 (La Unión)
- Frontier Detachment 4 (Usulután)
- Frontier Detachment 5 (San Vicente)
- Frontier Detachment 6 (Cuscatlán)
- Frontier Detachment 7 (Ahuachapán)
- Recruit Instruction Center (Sonsonate)
- Engineer Instruction Center (La Paz)
- Commando Instruction Center (Morazán)
- Artillery Brigade (Northern La Libertad)
- Cavalry Regiment (Southern La Libertad)

The Salvadoran Air Force was equipped with eight Dassault Ouragan jet fighter-bombers and six Fouga CM.170 Magister jet close air support/trainer aircraft purchased from Israel, which were originally used during the Football War against Honduras. It had twelve French SOCATA Rallye trainers, three Israeli IAI Arava 201 STOL light utility transports, and two Douglas DC-6's and three Douglas C-47 Skytrain transports. The Air Force also possessed five Aérospatiale Alouette III and five Aérospatiale SA 315B Lama helicopters. Six Bell UH-1H helicopters were leased from the United States. The Salvadoran Navy only possessed ten patrol boats, one Sewart patrol craft, and two harbor patrol craft; only one of which was fully operational. In total, the armed forces numbered between 13,000 and 20,000 personnel.

=== Guerrilla forces ===
Exact deployments of the FMLN are unknown, but the guerrillas numbered between 2,500 and 5,000 soldiers. The guerrillas were armed with FN FAL battle rifles, IMI Galil's, M16 assault rifles, M79 grenade launchers, and Type 56 rocket-propelled grenade launchers, RG-42's, and F-1 hand grenades, all of which were supplied by Nicaragua and Cuba. Weapons supplied by third parties were shipped to Cuba by commercial carriers, then brought clandestinely through the Gulf of Fonseca or overland through Nicaragua. While the labels on various items supplied were in Russian, (implying support from the Soviet Union) the Soviet Union had denied sending any support to the FMLN. Cuba sent military advisors and mercenaries, as well as a small monetary contribution to aid the FMLN.

== Offensive ==
=== First phase ===
On 9 January 1981, Duarte announced that the Salvadoran Armed Forces believed that guerrilla forces would begin an anticipated nationwide offensive and also stated that the military was ready to combat the offensive, which was expected to begin that day; the offensive actually began at 5 p.m. the following day. The FMLN attacked 43 different locations, including the Ilopango International Airport, the barracks of the 2nd Infantry Division in Santa Ana, and the headquarters of the Treasury Police in San Salvador. By the end of the day, the FMLN had captured four radio stations in the country. At 6:30 pm, Cayetano Carpio, one of the leaders of the FMLN, broadcast a message to rally support from the people which stated:

The time has come to begin the decisive military and insurrectional battles for the seizure of power by the people and for the establishment of a democratic revolutionary government. We call on all the people to rise up as a single man, with all means of combat, under the orders of their immediate chiefs, in all war fronts and throughout the national territory. We issue a call to all the progressive and patriotic soldiers and officers to join the ranks of the people, to turn their weapons against the cruel and bloody chiefs of the high command and the commanders of the counterrevolutionary army. The time for the revolution has arrived. The time for liberation has come. The definitive victory is in the hands of the heroic and courageous people. To the popular insurrections! To prepare the general strike! Revolution or death, we shall win!

— Cayetano Carpio, FMLN General Order Number 1

On 11 January, the High Command General Staff declared a 7 p.m. to 5 a.m. curfew in an effort to curb guerrilla activities. National radio networks informed civilians of the institution of the curfew at noon and stated that citizens with a valid reason to violate curfew had to contact the National Guard to organize transportation with the Red Cross and the Salvadoran Green Cross. While the 2nd Infantry Brigade defended Santa Ana, Captains Juan Francisco Emilio Mena Sandoval and Marcelo Cruz Cruz mutinied and murdered Lieutenant Colonel Baltazar Alonso Valdés. Many soldiers ended their mutiny and returned to their barracks once they realized Mena Sandoval and Cruz Cruz wanted to join the FMLN, however, 54 soldiers continued the mutiny and fled from the city with Mena Sandoval under the banner of the FMLN. Santa Ana, El Salvador's second largest city, was declared to be under a state of siege on 11 January after its main road connection to San Salvador was severed by the FMLN. The Cavalry Regiment under Major Óscar Campos Anaya was deployed from La Libertad to eastern San Salvador to defend the capital from a guerrilla assault that numbered around 500 men. The guerrillas attacked at night in units of 150 men, attacking suburbs and the headquarters of the National Guard using five stolen buses and rocket-propelled grenades. The FMLN distributed weapons and ammunition to locals, hoping to incite a popular uprising, but the citizenry mostly refused to participate and the poorer citizens barricaded themselves in their homes. During the attack, Lieutenant Ricardo Guillén Palma was killed by guerrillas with machine guns while driving through San Vicente at night. He was one of the first government and military officials to be killed by guerrillas while they were driving at night in rural areas. Ilopango and Comalapa International Airports were closed as a result of the beginning of the offensive. Throughout the night of 11 January, the 1st Infantry Brigade continued efforts to expel the FMLN from northern and eastern San Salvador, while the Engineer Instruction Center defended the department of La Paz from a nighttime attack.

Several installations of the National Guard in San Francisco Gotera, Chalatenango, Cinquera, Zacatecoluca, Santa Rosa de Lima, and Suchitoto came under attack early on the morning of 12 January. The 2nd Infantry Brigade began efforts to reclaim Santa Ana where the FMLN raised their banner, signifying the fall of the city to their forces, and around 85 percent of the city was recaptured by the end of the day. The 2nd Infantry Brigade secured Metapán and prevented it from surrendering to FMLN forces. Soldiers from the Recruit Instruction Center and the Artillery Brigade were dispatched to support the 2nd Infantry Brigade. Meanwhile, the 3rd Infantry Brigade defended San Francisco Gotera, the capital of Morazán, and the Frontier Detachment 1 was stationed in El Paraíso, Chalatenango, which came under nighttime attacks from the FMLN. By the end of the day, the FMLN captured and secured Mendez Island near El Triunfo in Usulután. The Guatemalan Army was mobilized on the Guatemalan–Salvadoran border to prevent any soldiers of the FMLN from entering the country, which itself was in the midst of its own civil war.

On 13 January, the Revolutionary Democratic Front (FDR), a coalition of mass organizations aligned with the FMLN, called for Salvadorans to go on a general strike to support the FMLN's offensive in FMLN General Order Number 2. The FMLN stated that it would assassinate Duarte. Duarte called on Salvadorans to ignore the FMLN and continue to work, promising that the Army would protect them. Around 20,000 Salvadorans from twenty-six factories went on strike, leading to several business closures. FMLN soldiers were optimistic and believed the offensive would succeed as their numbers were similar to those fielded by the Sandinista National Liberation Front (FSLN) in Nicaragua when Anastasio Somoza Debayle was overthrown in 1979. Reinforcements arrived to support the 3rd Infantry Brigade's defense of San Francisco Gotera, and the Air Force airlifted reinforcements and supplies to several isolated pockets in northern El Salvador and retrieved wounded from them. The FMLN attempted to capture the Cerrón Grande Hydroelectric Dam in Chalatenango and Cabañas which generated power for the nation by forming the Cerrón Grande Reservoir from the Lempa River. Mena Sandoval ended his mutiny and returned to the 2nd Infantry Brigade, revealing that the FMLN was expecting the arrival of 800 soldiers from Nicaragua. The Honduran Navy assisted the Salvadoran Navy by sending reports about rebel and Nicaraguan activities in the Gulf of Fonseca.

On 14 January, the United States resumed sending military aid to the JRG, which had been previously ended as a result of the rape and murder of four American missionaries by members of the National Guard in December 1980. U.S. President Jimmy Carter authorized the sending of $5 million in funding, six Bell UH-1H helicopters, M16 assault rifles, M79 grenade launchers, hand grenades, and helmets, which were delivered on 16 January. The FMLN launched a major attack on San Francisco Gotera, weakening government positions in the process. Other assaults occurred on Cinquera and Tecoluca. On the same day, the FDR and FMLN declared the establishment of the Political Diplomatic Commission (CDP) as the FMLN's government-in-exile. It was headed by Guillermo Ungo, a democratic socialist politician and a former member of the First Junta. The CDP sought international support and recognition from various political parties and it wanted to pursue dialogue directly with the United States, rather than the JRG.

At noon on 15 January, military intelligence warned that the FMLN would attack San Salvador's power grid later that night, but no such attack occurred. On 16 January, the Cavalry Regiment stated that La Libertad had been cleared of guerrillas. On 17 January, the FMLN attacked the Treasury Police at the Golden Bridge (Puente de Oro) 55 miles east of the capital. The government feared that other attacks would occur at the Cuscatlán Bridge and a railroad bridge, since they were the only other bridges that crossed the Lempa River, but those attacks did not manifest. The 2nd Infantry Division came under a FMLN attack in Santa Ana, but the attack, which numbered 100 men, was repelled. By the end of the first phase of the offensive, the FMLN had captured 82 cities and villages, mostly in northern El Salvador.

=== Second phase ===
On 18 January, the 1st Infantry Brigade attacked FMLN positions in Aguilares. Following the attack, Schafik Hándal, the leader of the Communist Party of El Salvador, declared a "temporary tactical retreat" and renamed the "final offensive" as the "general offensive," stating that the "first phase" had been completed. Despite the retreat, FMLN propaganda and radio broadcasts continued to state that the offensive was succeeding.

The FMLN captured both Chalatenango and San Francisco Gotera by 20 January, the capitals of the departments of Chalatenango and Morazán, respectively. Over two-thirds of El Salvador was engulfed in the fighting. Throughout the offensive, the FMLN used hit-and-run tactics, including burning buses in cities and stopping buses in the countryside to force passengers to join their ranks.

In the second week of the offensive, Robert E. White, the U.S. ambassador to El Salvador, presented evidence that one hundred FMLN fighters had arrived at La Unión on boats from Nicaragua, of which fifty-three had been killed in battle. He stated that the wood the boats were made of was only available in Nicaragua and not El Salvador, but local reporters stated that the boats had been spotted on the shores of La Unión days before the landing and Nicaragua denied any involvement.

On 25 January, an unauthorized Piper PA-23 light aircraft was spotted in Hacienda La Sabana, San Vicente, and the Army and Air Force sent infantry troops by a helicopter to capture the aircraft, supported by a Magister aircraft. The engagement resulted in the deaths of three soldiers: the Army learned that the pilots had been sent to recover the crew of a Cessna 310 which had crashed while being used to smuggle soldiers and weapons to the FMLN from Nicaragua. The Army discovered that the pilot of the Piper PA-23 was working for LANICA, the then national airline of Nicaragua.

== Aftermath ==
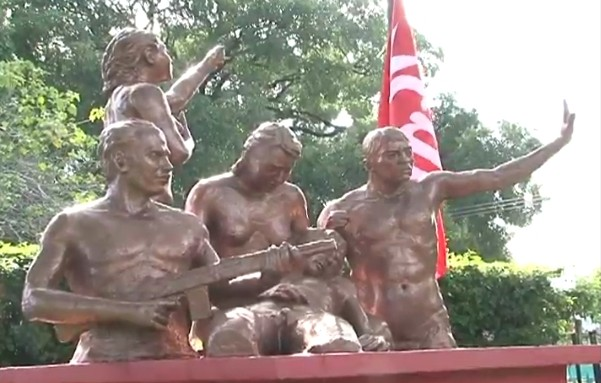
A monument to the guerrillas killed during the offensive

On 26 January, the leaders of the FMLN conceded that the offensive had not sparked the national uprising that they had hoped for. They had believed that their actions against the government would spark a "full-scale popular revolution" and that several garrisons would mutiny as had happened in Nicaragua two years earlier. Other than the general strike that occurred early in the offensive and the mutiny in Santa Ana, the FMLN did not receive significant support from the citizenry or military. The FMLN theorized that the thousands of killings committed by the Armed Forces and various death squads over the previous year had deprived the FMLN of allies that would have helped launch a popular revolution. The threat to assassinate Duarte was a factor in failing to gain popular support, as despite the FMLN's claims that he was an oligarch supporter, the Salvadoran oligarchy despised Duarte and he was popular among the people. Government programs, such as a land redistribution program that had benefitted around 200,000 peasants, were another reason for the uprising's failure.

Despite the failure of the offensive, the FMLN proved itself as an effective fighting force. The military did not fracture and morale remained high. As a result of the offensive, and specifically because of the attack on Ilopango International Airport, Reagan signed an executive order on 1 February 1981 authorizing $55 million in emergency aid and funding for the Salvadoran government. The government arrested several politicians that were suspected of being involved in the offensive throughout 1981.

The leaders of the JRG were "extremely proud" of how the military reacted to the guerrilla offensive. The JRG held a press conference on 5 November regarding the events of the offensive in which García stated that the Army had "neutralized" the offensive of the FMLN, which he referred to as "terrorists". He applauded the Salvadoran people for not overwhelmingly supporting the FMLN's calls for a general strike, stating that they were "steadfastly opposed" to the FMLN.

In the months following the offensive, the FMLN began a series of attacks on the urban areas in San Salvador. In those months, the United States' embassy in San Salvador was struck by rocket-propelled grenades twice. The FMLN subsequently declared the result of the offensive as a military defeat but a political victory, and later changed its tactics and approaches in combating the government. Government casualties totaled 122 deaths and 195 wounded during the offensive, while the FMLN suffered from approximately 500 to over 1,000 deaths, ranging from 10 to 40 percent of its total fighting force. By 1982, the FMLN controlled around one fourth of the country (territories called "Liberated Zones"), and for the remainder of the civil war, the FMLN continued carrying out raids and attacks against government targets.

On 12 January 1981, the Boricua Popular Army (EPB) carried out a terrorist bombing at the Muñiz Air National Guard Base in San Juan, Puerto Rico in "revolutionary solidarity with the brotherly people of El Salvador and their revolutionary organizations (the FMLN)". The EPB's attack coincided with the early days of the final offensive of 1981.

== See also ==
- Final offensive of 1989
