= TACA Flight 390 =

2008 aviation accident in Honduras

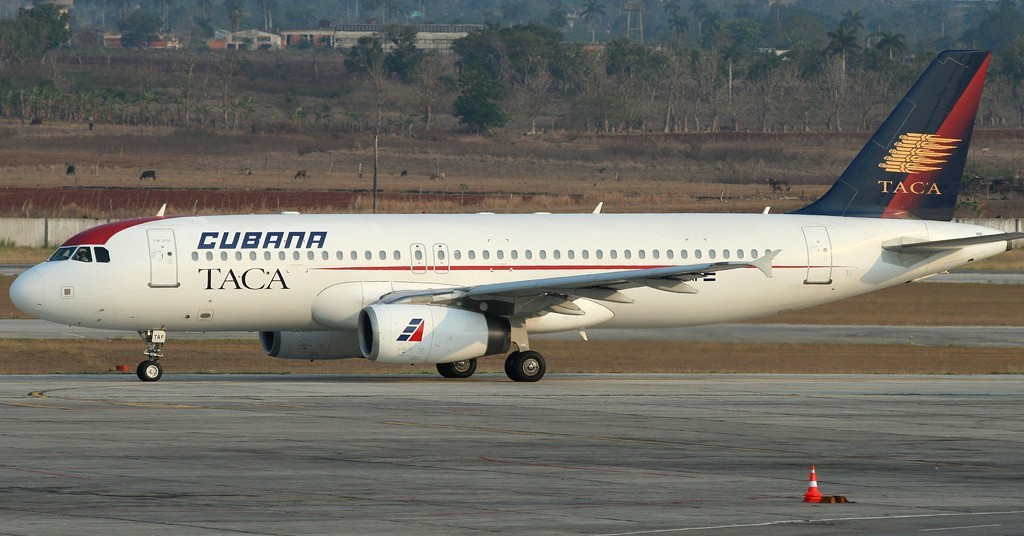
- EI-TAF, the aircraft involved in the accident, while leased to Cubana de Aviación in 2006

Accident
- Date: May 30, 2008
- Summary: Runway overrun, pilot error
- Site: Toncontín International Airport, Tegucigalpa, Honduras; 14.0702°N 87.2141°W
- Total fatalities: 5

Aircraft
- Aircraft type: Airbus A320-233
- Operator: TACA
- IATA flight No.: AV390
- ICAO flight No.: TAI390
- Call sign: TACA 390
- Registration: EI-TAF
- Flight origin: El Salvador International Airport, San Salvador, El Salvador
- 1st stopover: Toncontín International Airport, Tegucigalpa, Honduras
- 2nd stopover: Ramón Villeda Morales International Airport, San Pedro Sula, Honduras
- Destination: Miami International Airport, Miami, Florida
- Passengers: 124
- Crew: 11
- Fatalities: 3
- Injuries: 65
- Survivors: 132

Ground casualties
- Ground fatalities: 2

TACA Flight 390 was a scheduled flight on May 30, 2008, by TACA International from San Salvador, El Salvador, to Miami, Florida, United States, with intermediate stops at Tegucigalpa and San Pedro Sula in Honduras. The aircraft, an Airbus A320, overran the runway after landing at Tegucigalpa's Toncontín International Airport and rolled out into a street, crashing into an embankment and smashing several cars in the process.

El Salvador's Civil Aviation Authority spearheaded the investigation, which attributed the accident to pilot error. The crew opted to go around after failing to stabilise their first approach. The pilots, who became increasingly frustrated due to the deteriorating weather condition and their difficult approach, misjudged the distance that they required for landing. The aircraft touched down well beyond its recommended zone. The preceding tailwind, heavy weight of the aircraft, and wet runway hindered the aircraft's deceleration during the roll, causing the aircraft to not lose speed quickly enough and eventually to run off the runway.

== Background ==
=== Aircraft ===
The aircraft was an Airbus A320-233 with c/n 1374. It was built in 2000 and was registered as EI-TAF in 2006.

=== Passengers and crew ===
| Nationality | Total |
|---|---|
| Honduras | 60 |
| Costa Rica | 17 |
| Argentina | 9 |
| Guatemala | 8 |
| United States | 7 |
| Nicaragua | 5 |
| Mexico | 3 |
| El Salvador | 3 |
| Brazil | 2 |
| Canada | 2 |
| Colombia | 2 |
| Spain | 2 |
| Germany | 1 |
| Georgia | 1 |
| Italy | 1 |
| Uruguay | 1 |
| Total | 135 |

The aircraft was carrying 124 passengers and 11 crew members from 16 different nationalities. Majority of those on board were Hondurans, including all crew members but the pilots, who were Salvadoran. Costa Rican officials stated that there were 23 Costa Rican passengers aboard; however, the manifest released from TACA only showed 17 Costa Rican nationals. Spanish embassy stated that two Spanish residents of Honduras were on board. The Argentinian embassy stated that a group of 9 ballet dancers were aboard the flight and were heading to a dance festival in Honduras.

Among the passengers were the Brazilian ambassador to Honduras, Brian Michael Fraser Neele; his wife, Jeanne Chantal; former Chairman of the Joint Chiefs of Staff Daniel López Carballo; president of the Central American Bank for Economic Integration Harry Brautigam; former Honduran Minister of Industry and Commerce, Norman Garcia; Marta Castillo, Vice-president of the Chamber of Commerce, and former Minister of Housing and Planning of Costa Rica, Helio Fallas.

The flight crew included:

- Pilot in command was 40-year-old Captain Cesare Edoardo D'Antonio Mena. He had 11,899 flight hours, including 8,514 hours on the Airbus A320.
- The pilot-not-flying was 26-year-old First Officer Juan Rodolfo Artero Arevalo. He had 1,607 hours with 250 of them on the Airbus A320.

=== Airport ===
Tocontin International Airport is considered to be one of the most dangerous airports in the world due to the location of the airport, which is located within a valley surrounded by mountainous terrain. It is also located within Tegucigalpa, and the adjacent areas are filled with residential homes. As a result of its location, the airport needs a specifically made, complicated approach plan in order for aircraft to land safely. Approaching the airport is mentally demanding, particularly during inclement weather condition. Pilots are required to make a steep descent before making a tight turn and eventually landing. The runway is also significantly shorter than standard, at only 2 km long, and there are public roads on both ends of the runway.

Both pilots had previous experience in landing at Toncontín International Airport; Captain D'Antonio had landed at the airport 52 times, and First Officer Artero had landed there five times.

== Accident ==
Flight 390 was a short-haul flight from San Salvador to the Honduran capital of Tegucicalpa that would later continue to Miami, Florida. On 30 May 2008, the aircraft operating the flight was carrying 124 passengers and 11 crew members. The flight was scheduled to take off at 08:45 local time, with an expected time of arrival at 09:45 a.m. It took off from Comalapa Airport at 09:05 a.m.

=== First approach ===
At 15:17 local time, flying at 15,000ft from the west, Flight 390 contacted the Tegucigalpa approach controller and was instructed to descend to 10,000ft before making a VOR approach to Runway 02, with a visual circling above the runway before landing on Runway 20 (the other side of Runway 02). The controller also gave the crew the weather conditions at the airport. Visibility was limited to 2 km and low cloud ceilings were prevailing to the south of the airport, while conditions for the other areas were good enough. It was also raining and winds of 5 knots were present.

Tegucigalpa ATC later gave more instructions to the crew, including the fix point to the southwest of the airport for a VOR approach to Runway 02. The controller then instructed the crew to descend to 9,000ft and requested them to notify the ATC when they had reached said point. After reaching the fix, they would be instructed to turn left towards the runway, coming in to the airport from the southwest. While flying at 5,600ft, the controller cleared Flight 390 to continue their approach. The aircraft continued to descend and the crew began looking for the runway.

Bad weather conditions hindered the crew from being able to see the runway. Captain D'Antonio stated that he would do a go-around if the runway could not be seen. First Officer Artero confirmed that he could see the city of Tegucigalpa. Due to the limited visibility, Captain D'Antonio asked First Officer Artero to contact to ask for a go-around and to climb to 8,000ft.

| 09:26:35 | Captain | Look if you see something, If not, we are going to go around |
| 09:26:39 | First Officer | [Unintelligible], ...not now. No. |
| 09:26:46 | First Officer | Here is the city, Capi! |
| 09:26:48 | Captain | Yes, but like this I cannot circle |
| 09:26:49 | First Officer | Yes. |
| 09:26:57 | Captain | Ask him if he clear us to climb to eight thousand and... in the zero zero eight. |

The ATC approved their request and cleared them to climb to 8,000 ft. Afterwards, they were asked to turn left towards the VOR. During the go-around, Captain D'Antonio said to First Officer Artero that he would not set the thrust to full go-around power to avoid causing discomfort to the passengers.

=== Second approach ===
While climbing to 8,000 ft, Captain D'Antonio stated that he would not use Runway 20 since by doing so he would go through clouds due to the low ceiling, which would worsen the crew's ability to see the runway. He told First Officer Artero that they would circle the runway again and would later land with a tailwind on runway 02. Afterwards, he contacted ATC stating his intention to do an approach to Runway 02. The controller authorized his request and ordered the crew to do the approach to Runway 02.

Captain D'Antonio radioed TACA operation control if they needed to divert to San Pedro Sula Airport in case they failed their second attempt. The TACA officer who handled Flight 390 instead suggested them to land using Runway 20, which earlier had been decided by Captain D'Antonio to not be used due to the prevailing weather. However, prior to the flight, San Pedro Sula had been considered as the alternate airport and fuel had been added in case the crew failed to land at Toncontín and needed to divert.

First Officer Artero asked for information regarding the prevailing weather conditions and the ATC stated that the wind was blowing at 7 knots. Flight 390 then descended through 6,000ft and began approaching the runway. The crew then saw the runway and decided to do a circle to land on Runway 02. As First Officer Artero announced their intention to the ATC, the controller gave the recent update regarding the wind speed.

| 09:40:20 | First Officer | Approach TACA 390 with runway in sight, we are going to continue visual circling to the [Runway] 02 |
| 09:40:41 | ATC | TACA 390 confirm... requesting runway 02 with the wind from 200° [at] 10 knots, over? |
| 09:40:48 | First Officer | 200 [degree] 10 [knots] he says... |
| 09:40:49 | Captain | ...yes because the circle-to-land to the [Runway] 20 is very difficult he says |
| 09:40:52 | First Officer | Copied, afirm, requesting circle-to-land to the [Runway] 02 because...circling to land for [Runway] 20 is not possible now |

During the circling, the autopilot and the flight directors were turned off and the landing gear was extended. After extending the flaps to the full position, the crew read through the landing checklist and continued the descent. The ATC eventually cleared them for landing, reminding them that the wind was blowing at 10 knots, as well as cautioning them that the runway was damp. At around 09:45 a.m, Flight 390 touched down at Toncontín's Runway 02, approximately 400 meters from the displaced threshold with a tailwind of 10 knots.

=== Crash ===
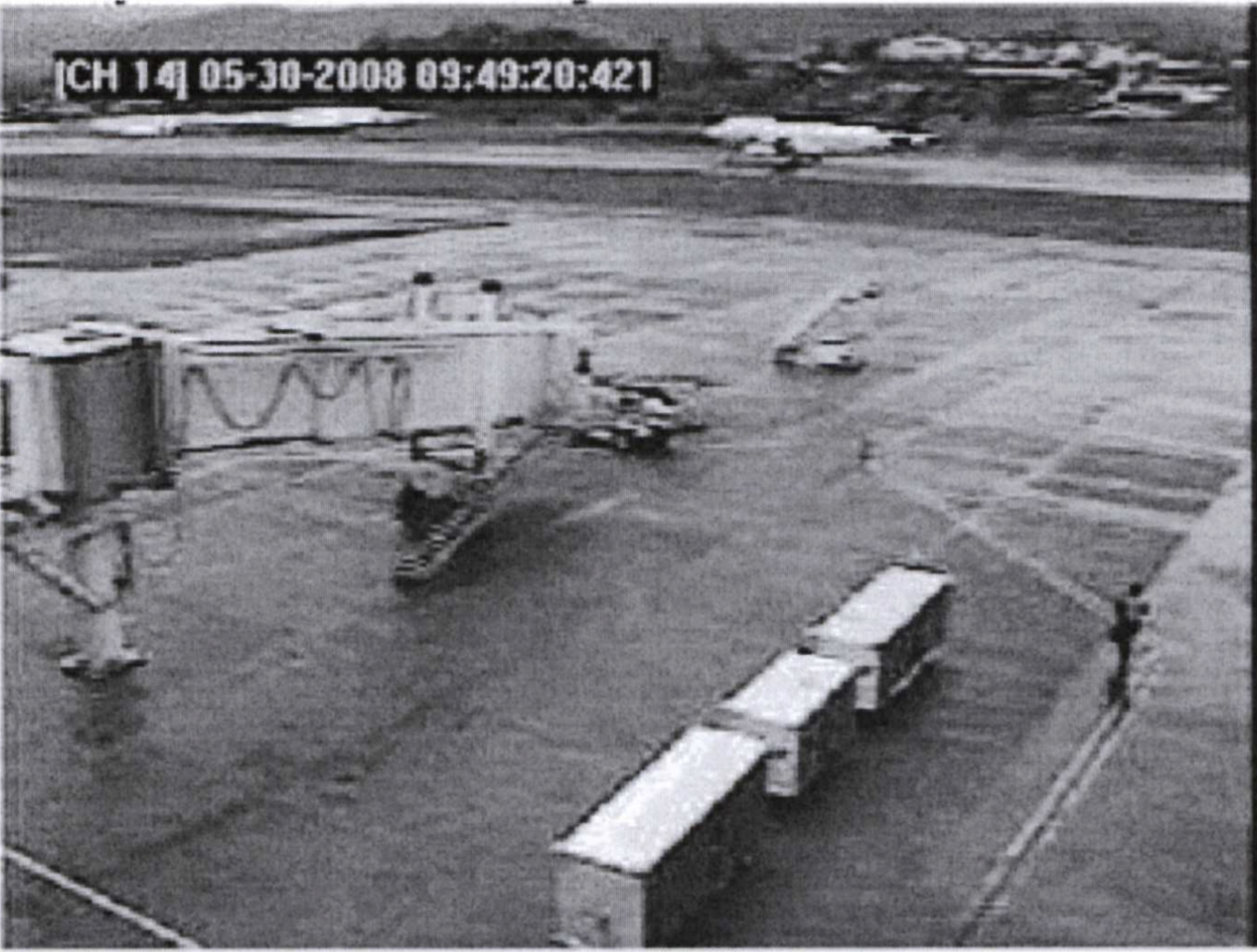
The aircraft on the runway

Shortly after touching down, the crew pulled the thrust lever and armed the aircraft's ground spoilers. The aircraft was rolling at a speed of 160 knots, and gradually decreasing. After momentarily activating the autobrake, the crew began applying manual braking, before releasing them for a few seconds and then pressing them again. The crew stepped progressively deeper on the pedals until it reached its maximum braking. The Airbus A320 was still travelling at a ground speed of 90 knots.

The pilots put the thrust into the forward idle position and all except the right and left hand spoilers were retracted. The aircraft was still not decelerating at an acceptable rate. As the end of the runway became closer, the antiskid was turned off and the spoilers were fully extended. Feeling desperate, both pilots applied parking brake. By then, the aircraft was already a few hundred feet from the cliff.

Failing to stop, the aircraft ran off at a speed of 54 knots (62 mph; 100 km/h) and flew a little before it came crashing down onto a public road and smashed through passing vehicles. A total of 2 cars, including a taxi, and one motorcycle were hit by the Airbus A320. The aircraft broke into three main sections, with the front part of the aircraft and the avionics bay pushing through the business class, causing numerous injuries to the occupants.

Seconds after coming into a stop, hysteria quickly set in inside the cabin. Fire began to erupt on the right wing after a pole tore through it. Coincidentally, a fire truck was travelling on the road and immediately extinguished the flames. Meanwhile, airport personnel at Toncontín deployed rescue services to the crash site. Survivors began pouring out from the opened doors and also breaks within the airframe. Rescuers attempted to rescue the occupants who were trapped inside the business class, who were trapped by the avionics and parts of the aircraft that had pushed through the floor and walls.

== Response ==
Emergency services arrived within minutes at the crash site. Firefighters reported that fuel could be seen leaking from the broken wing and attempts were made to douse the aircraft. After the forward door was successfully opened, rescuers managed to rescue the remaining occupants who were trapped by the mangled cabin. They also stated that at least two people were trapped inside the cars that had been crushed by the aircraft. Authorities later cordoned the area and tried to move hundreds of onlookers who had gathered at the site.

TACA opened phone lines to provide more information for the relatives on the crash. A list of passengers was provided in the fifth press release on the crash from TACA international. Officials from the airline stated that emergency procedure were being implemented immediately after the crash.

Five people died as a result of the accident, including Captain D'Antonio. The deceased passengers were later confirmed as Jeanne Chantal Neele, the wife of Brian Michael Fraser Neele (Brazil's ambassador to Honduras, who was also on board), and Nicaraguan businessman Harry Brautigam, president of the Central American Bank for Economic Integration; Brautigam died from a heart attack. La Nación initially stated that there were two fatalities on the ground, both of whom were university students. Honduran newspaper La Prensa stated that the deceased were a taxi driver and a motorcyclist, whose vehicles were crushed directly beneath the aircraft. The occupants from the other cars that had been hit by the aircraft managed to survive unscathed.

A total of 65 people were injured in the crash, many of whom suffered smoke inhalation and cuts. At least 39 people were seriously injured with one person had to be airlifted due to major burns. One of the survivors said that the business class passengers sustained the most serious injuries. Among those injured were Ambassador Fraser Neele, the former head of the Honduran armed forces; Daniel López Carballo, Marta Castillo, Norman Garcia and Helio Fallas. The injured were transported to various hospitals across Tegucigalpa, including the nation's biggest hospital Honduras General Hospital and Tegucigalpa Military Hospital. Helio Fallas reportedly was in serious condition and was transported to Honduras Medical Center. TACA executive director, Roberto Kriete, stated that at least 4 people, including First Officer Artero, were in critical condition.

After hearing the news of the crash, incumbent Honduran President Manuel Zelaya announced the closure of Toncontin International Airport for large aircraft and ordered airlines to use Palmerola Air Base for landing, while permitting small aircraft to land in Toncontin. Incoming flights would be diverted to San Pedro Sula. Zelaya stated that U.S President Bush had raised the issue regarding the airport during Zelaya's recent visit. Zelaya also added that a new airport would be built near Toncontin in response to criticisms regarding the airport's notorious reputation of being one of the world's most dangerous airports.

== Investigation ==
Honduran authorities delegated the investigation of the accident to the Civil Aviation Authority of El Salvador as per the Convention on International Civil Aviation. The Civil Aviation Authority of Honduras would still be involved in the investigation as it happened within Honduran airspace. Officials stated that investigators from the United States National Transportation Safety Board and representatives from Federal Aviation Administration (FAA) would be involved as well. France's BEA stated that they would send their representatives to assist the probe.

=== Landing analysis ===
The aircraft touched down at Toncontín after the crew's second attempt at approaching Runway 02. Prior to landing, the crew had acknowledged the dangerous weather condition around the airport, including the presence of tailwind and headwind. The aircraft touched down approximately 400 meters past the displaced threshold and rolled with a ground speed of 160 knots. The nose was still up and remained in the air for 7 seconds. Its nose wheel finally came down when the aircraft had travelled for approximately 950 meters from the displaced threshold.

Maximum reverse thrust was immediately applied after the wheels touched down on the runway, and the ground spoilers were extended. Shortly after, manual braking was applied, causing the autobrake to turn off. Pressure analysis from the FDR indicated that the pedals were progressively pressed during the landing. The brakes were working properly and had worked as they had been intended. The brake pressure had fluctuations due to the activated anti-skid system, which provided the aircraft with protection from aquaplaning.

The spoilers and reversers were then put off early by the crew. By the time the nose had touched the ground, the spoilers were retracted and the reversers were decreased as they thought that their actions were enough to cause the aircraft to decelerate. As it was the first trip of a long transcontinental flight, the aircraft would be weighing near its maximum landing weight due to unloaded cargo. This in turn worsened the aircraft's ability to stop due to the heavy weight. By the time the aircraft had reached 1,550 meters from the displaced threshold (approximately just 300 meters from the runway end), the crew realized that the aircraft was not decelerating enough. The aircraft deceleration had actually been reduced from 0.35G to 0.15G. The crew then quickly turned off the anti-skid system.

After turning off the anti-skid system, the protection for aquaplaning was disabled as well. Examinations made by the wheel manufacturer showed that a total of three wheels showed flat spots due to blocked wheels on a damp runway surface, while one of the wheels didn't show any flat spots. This indicated that the aircraft had suffered aquaplaning. Losing much of the runway, the crew eventually opted to use the ground braking, but by then the aircraft had already left the runway and flew onto the road.

Simulations conducted by investigators concluded that had the crew immediately applied full braking and maximum thrust immediately after touching down, the aircraft wouldn't have overrun the runway.

=== Weather condition ===
Tropical Storm Alma on 29 May, a day before the accident

During the approach and landing, radar data showed that Tegucigalpa was covered with rainy clouds, some of those having low ceilings, causing the approach to the airport's runway to be rendered difficult due to low visibility. This was caused by the passage of Tropical Storm Alma, which, at the time of the accident, was moving through the country and producing torrential rains across the region. The storm caused floods, worsening visibility and fluctuating winds.

The storm complicated Flight 390's approach to Toncontín. Following the flight crew’s failed landing attempt at Runway 20, they intended to land on its opposite end, Runway 02. At the time, however, the cloud ceiling was at 2,500ft, lower than the minimum decision altitude of 2,703ft for runway 20. The CVR recorded Captain D'Antonio saying that the aircraft would hit a mountain if the pilots decided to use Runway 20 and hence decided to use Runway 02 instead.

Weather data revealed that strong headwind and tailwind were present at the airport on that day. The presence of tailwind, which was blowing in the same direction as the aircraft's landing trajectory, would have caused difficulty for the pilots to stop the aircraft. At the time of the accident, the tailwind was blowing at a speed of 10 knots, which was faster than the permitted 5 knots for a landing operation. The Airbus A320 guideline stated that if the aircraft was landing with a tailwind, the pilots should have landed before the first perpendicular taxiway. If they landed past it, then they would be obliged to go around. On that day, Flight 390 landed approximately 150 meters from the taxiway.

Aggravating the condition was the lack of grooving. There was not enough grooving on the runway, which would have drained the rainwater that had pooled on the runway. Combined with the continuous rain, the lack of grooving on the pavement caused rainwater to pool on the runway and eventually diminished the deceleration of the aircraft. This, in turn, also propagated the aquaplaning effect due to excess of water.

As a result of the 10-knot tailwind, the aircraft's deceleration worsened. Braking efficiency was further diminished due to the pooling of water on the runway.

=== Runway Conditions ===
In addition to being a notoriously dangerous airport, the runway at Toncontin Airport was found to be substandard in the years leading up to the TACA Flight 390 crash. According to the official accident report, the airport operator failed to repave the runway in 2003, despite contractual obligations with the Honduran government and a stipulated deadline. By 2007, the runway had deteriorated significantly, with structural deficiencies affecting approximately 24,000 square meters (about 260,000 square feet), representing nearly 30% of the total runway surface.

An inspection conducted by the General Directorate of Civil Aeronautics (DGAC) identified “grave technical discrepancies” in the reconstruction efforts, warning that these posed a threat to air navigation. Despite repeated requests from DGAC and TACA International Airlines dating back to 2003, the runway’s coefficient of friction had not been tested as of one month prior to the crash. Pilots had consistently reported poor braking action, and TACA officials expressed concern that the onset of the rainy season would further compromise runway safety.

The accident report also noted that the engineering and construction of the runway failed to meet International Civil Aviation Organization (ICAO) standards.

=== Decision to land ===
The approach to Toncontín Airport was stressful as the approach procedure that the flight crew had to take was complicated. The bad weather condition caused further difficulty for the pilots. Following their failed first attempt to land at Toncontin, it was likely that they had faced increased workload pressure and become more stressed due to a possible flight diversion to San Pedro Sula, which was located up north of the country. This high workload eventually led to poor decision-making.

After contacting the ATC on their intention to try to land again on Runway 02, the controller told the crew about the tailwind on Runway 02. Even though both crew members knew about the presence of such fast-moving wind, Captain D'Antonio, as the commander of the flight, insisted on landing on Runway 02. The pilots already had San Pedro Sula planned as the alternate airport if the weather condition in Tegucigalpa did not permit them to land, and the company operation manual stated that the pilots should have diverted due to the inclement condition, but they still decided to land in Tegucigalpa.

Shortly after touching down, the crew pressed the brake pedals and thought that the aircraft would eventually stop. However, due to the presence of a tailwind, landing weight near its maximum permissible state, and a wet and short runway, the aircraft failed to stop. Taking the tailwind and wet runway condition into account, the Actual Landing Distance (ALD) for Flight 390 would have been 1,572 meters. The available landing distance in Toncontín was 1,649 meters. As the aircraft had landed past the recommended zone for touch-down, the aircraft went way past the available landing distance.

=== Conclusion ===
The accident report stated that the airplane had landed with a 10-knot (19 km/h; 12 mph) tailwind, 400 metres (1,300 ft) from the displaced approach end of the runway. Since this was the first intermediate stop on a long transcontinental flight, the aircraft was near its maximum landing-weight limit (63.5 t vs. 64.5 t maximum allowable). In addition, the runway was wet, due to the passage of Tropical Storm Alma.

The Civil Aviation Authority concluded the cause of the accident was the flight crew's inappropriate decision to continue the landing despite not assessing the conditions of the runway, which did not follow standard operating procedures. The lack of grooving in the runway and the aircraft landing at a high speed of 160 knots (180 mph; 300 km/h) were also contributing factors.

== Aftermath ==
In May 2009, in the aftermath of the crash, the runway was renovated. An additional 300 meters runway extension was added on the south of the runway, increasing the length from 1,863 meters to 2,163 meters. Operations in Toncontín Airport were eventually moved following the inauguration of the new Comayagua International Airport, previously known as Palmerola Air Base, in 2021.

== See also ==
- List of accidents and incidents involving the Airbus A320 family
- TAM Airlines Flight 3054
- Jeju Air Flight 2216
