= National Resistance Armed Forces =

- Fuerzas Armadas de la Resistencia Nacional
- Founding leader: Ernesto Jovel
- Dates active: 1975–1992
- Country: El Salvador
- Allegiance: Farabundo Martí National Liberation Front
- Ideology: Revolutionary socialism Anti-imperialism
- Part of: National Resistance
- Wars: Salvadoran Civil War

The National Resistance Armed Forces (Spanish: Fuerzas Armadas de la Resistencia Nacional) was the military arm of National Resistance, a Salvadoran socialist organization that was founded on May 10, 1975, when ideological differences within the People's Revolutionary Army (ERP) and the assassinations of Roque Dalton and Armando Arteaga made some members break away from the ERP. Ernesto Jovel was its first general secretary. Other founding members of the RN included Eduardo Sancho (a.k.a. Fermán Cienfuegos), Lil Milagro Ramírez, Julia Rodríguez and Arsenio.

== See also ==
- History of El Salvador
- Salvadoran Civil War
