= National Resistance (El Salvador) =

Left-wing political party in El Salvador from 1975 to 1992

- Resistencia Nacional
- Flag of Resistencia Nacional
- Dates active: 1975–1992
- Split from: People's Revolutionary Army
- Country: El Salvador
- Ideology: Revolutionary socialism Anti-imperialism
- Political position: Left-wing
- Part of: FMLN
- Wars: Salvadoran Civil War

National Resistance (Spanish: Resistencia Nacional) was a Salvadoran political party. It began as a revolutionary organization founded on March 10, 1975, which became part of the FMLN coalition in 1980, against the military junta in the Salvadoran Civil War.

== Origin ==
The RN was formed by people who left the ERP and who advocated for more of a mass orientation, as opposed to the militarist orientation the ERP had at the time. During the separation, the ERP ordered the executions of Roque Dalton and Armando Arteaga, claiming political betrayal. This made some members break away from the PRS-ERP, hence creating la Resistencia Nacional.

Ernesto Jovel was its first general secretary. Other founding members of the RN included Eduardo Sancho (a.k.a. Fermán Cienfuegos), Lil Milagro Ramírez, Julia Rodríguez and Arsenio.

== During the civil war ==
In 1975, the National Resistance put into practice the line that Dalton and his co-thinkers in the ERP had advocated, putting more emphasis on sectoral organizing amongst the masses of people (in unions, student organizations, etc.). The RN was primarily based in Morazán Department as guerrilla commandos as well as in the city of San Salvador as clandestine urban forces mainly composed of university students. The armed wing of the Resistencia Nacional was FARN (Fuerzas Armadas de la Resistencia Nacional) known as RN-FARN.

The National Resistance conducted fewer attacks against the dictatorship in El Salvador compared to the FPL or ERP, but the RN operatives were well more effective in destabilizing the national tyranny with a lot fewer deaths on both sides. After peace accords were signed in 1992, all armed FMLN units were demobilized and their organization became a legal political party. The FMLN is now one of the two major political parties in El Salvador.
