= Francisco Adolfo Castillo =

Salvadoran military officer

Colonel Francisco Adolfo Castillo
- Born: c. 1927; El Salvador
- Died: 17 June 1982 (aged 55); Perquín, El Salvador
- Military career
- Allegiance: El Salvador
- Branch: Salvadoran Army
- Service years: ? – 1982
- Rank: Colonel
- Conflicts: Salvadoran Civil War: Final offensive of 1981

Francisco Adolfo Castillo (c. 1927 – 17 June 1982) was a Salvadoran military officer who served as the deputy minister of defense during the Salvadoran Civil War. He was a member High Command General Staff during the final offensive of 1981. He was killed in June 1982 when the military helicopter he was onboard was shot down in Perquín, Morazán, by the Farabundo Martí National Liberation Front (FMLN).
