= Honduran presidential aircraft =

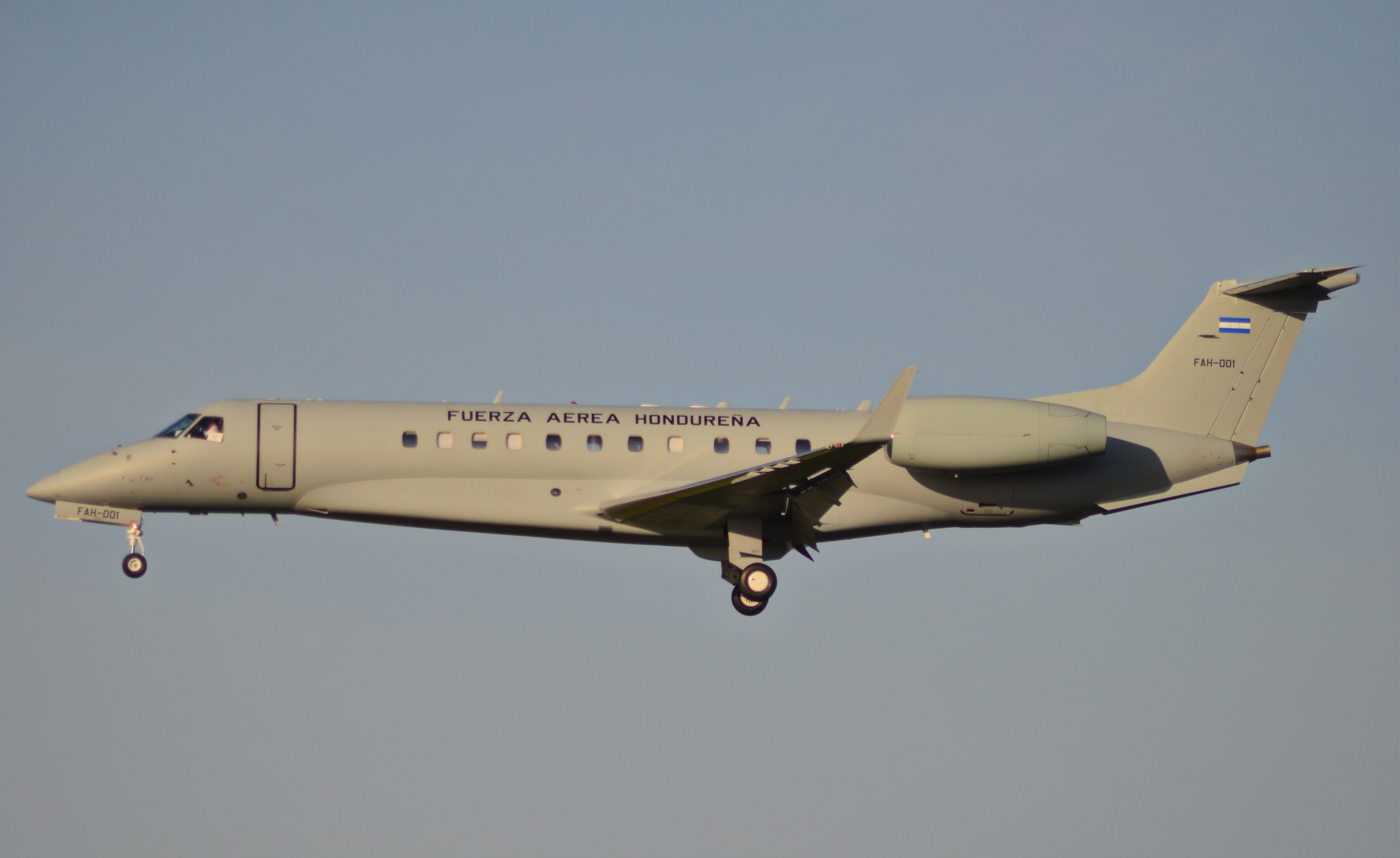
Embraer Legacy 600 (FAH-001) the last Honduran presidential fixed-wing aircraft

The latest Honduran presidential aircraft were an Embraer Legacy 600 jet, donated by the Taiwanese Government; and a Bell 412 helicopter.

== History ==
Since its first purchase of an IAI 1123 Westwind in 1976, the HAF Westwinds have transported the most senior government officials, both civilian and military, to many countries. The airplanes have had 3 color schemes in its history (all white in the 70s, White and Blue in the 80s, and Silver and Blue Metallic currently). The first Westwind was a 1123 model, which was later replaced by an IAI 1124 Westwind. In the mid-70's, the Honduras government bought a package of aircraft from Israel, the first lot of 12 Dassault Super Mystères, and 2 IAI Aravas plus an IAI 1123, which had operating limitations flying out of Toncontin International Airport (TGU), on the nation's capital, Tegucigalpa, to foreign destinations such as Washington, DC, due to lack of fuel capacity. The later IAI 1124 model, acquired in the 1980s, had enhanced performance due to more powerful and fuel efficient engines.

== Presidential aircraft in Honduras ==
Honduras was the first Central American country to have a presidential aircraft; the first of these was a Beechcraft 17 single-engine aircraft supplemented with a Curtiss Condor twin-engine transport, which was followed in the late 1940s by a Douglas C-47A converted to a VIP passenger transport in the 1960s until it was replaced by the IAI 1123 Westwind in 1975 followed by the IAI 1124 Westwind in 1980. In addition to the Westwind, the Honduran president had a Sikorsky S-76 in the late 1970s, followed by an Agusta A109E Power in the late 90s and more recently a Bell 412SP. In 2015 the government of Honduras bought a helicopter Bell 412EP and acquired for presidential use an Embraer legacy 600, donated by the government of Taiwan. In 2022, newly elected president Xiomara Castro promised during her presidential campaign to sell the aircraft and fly commercial and use the money for social projects for the poor.

== Controversy ==
The IAI 1124 Westwind HR-PHO was involved in several controversies. Recent incidents include:

- The government of Honduras was severely criticized as the "West Wind" was used solely to transport the President to Miami to catch a civilian flight to Africa in 2008, costing nearly $25,000.
- In May 2009 the government was also criticized for making a further expenditure of $315,000 in repairs to the airplane.
- The Honduran government has also been criticized for making unnecessary use of the airplane in alleged family trips for the president's family and his foreign ministers. This includes a long trip by Patricia Rodas after being named Chancellor (Minister of Foreign Affairs) of Honduras. Also Zelaya's daughter allegedly used the plane to travel with friends to Colombia to attend a Shakira concert
- During the 2009 Honduran coup d'état, President Manuel Zelaya was transported to Costa Rica in the Westwind.
- For being considered as "outdated documents", the authorities of Honduras Air Force burned a document that records the identity of people using the West Wind in 2006, generating a big controversy in Honduran society.

== See also ==
- Honduras
- Manuel Zelaya Rosales
- Toncontín International Airport
- Military of Honduras
- List of civil aircraft
- Air transports of heads of state and government
- Russian presidential aircraft – Official aircraft of the President of Russia
