= Harry Brautigam =

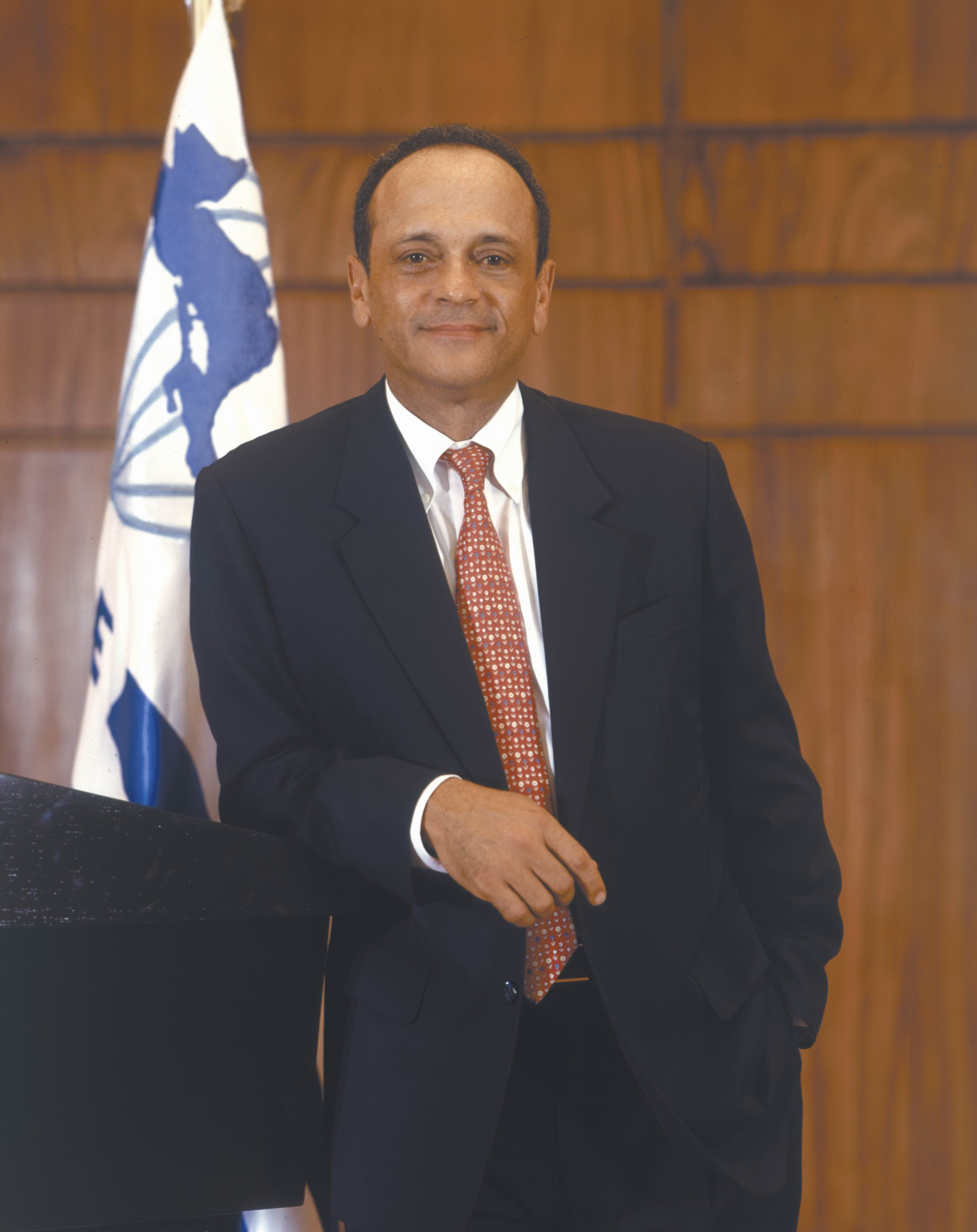
- Born: October 29, 1948; Bluefields, Nicaragua
- Died: May 30, 2008 (aged 59); Toncontín International Airport, Tegucigalpa, Honduras
- Occupation(s): Economist, banker, academic
- Spouse: Marilyn Gerald (married 1976–2008)
- Children: 3

Harry Emil Brautigam (October 29, 1948 – May 30, 2008) was a Nicaraguan economist, banker and academic.

== Biography ==
Brautigam, son of Harry and Lucille Brautigam, was born and raised in Bluefields, Nicaragua. He received a bachelor's degree in Business Administration in Guadalajara, Mexico. Brautigam was awarded a British Council Scholarship and went on to receive a postgraduate diploma in Manchester, England. He finalized his master's degree in economics at the University of Leeds and later received a Ph.D. in agriculture economics from the University of Illinois in the United States.

While in England, he met Marilyn Gerald, whom he later married in Nicaragua in 1976.

They had their first child, Harry Emil Brautigam, in Managua, Nicaragua, in 1978. Soon after, they returned to the United States, where Brautigam accepted a position as a professor of economics at the University of Delaware. In 1981, their second child, Claire, was born. They moved to Boston, Massachusetts, where Brautigam commenced his banking career at the Bank of Boston and welcomed their last child, Anna, in 1984.

A year later, the family moved to Miami, where Brautigam accepted a position at Bank of America. They were relocated to San Francisco for four years, later returning to Miami. Brautigam made another professional move to Barclays Bank in 1988.

On September 1, 2003, Brautigam was elected president of the Banco Centroamericano de Integración Económica (BCIE) in Tegucigalpa, Honduras, where he and his wife resided for five years. He was the first elected president of the BCIE (the result of an international search of qualified candidates). Through his leadership, BCIE was able to reach important achievements that helped to position the institution as the main provider of resources for the region. It was a fulfillment of a life goal to be able to use his knowledge and experience to help improve his home country, Nicaragua, as well as the rest of Central America. He was decorated by the Colombian government and awarded the Order of Ruben Dario by the Nicaraguan government.

Brautigam died of a heart attack in the TACA Flight 390 airliner crash at Toncontín International Airport in Tegucigalpa, Honduras on May 30, 2008.
