= Tropical storms Alma and Arthur =

East Pacific and Atlantic tropical storms in 2008

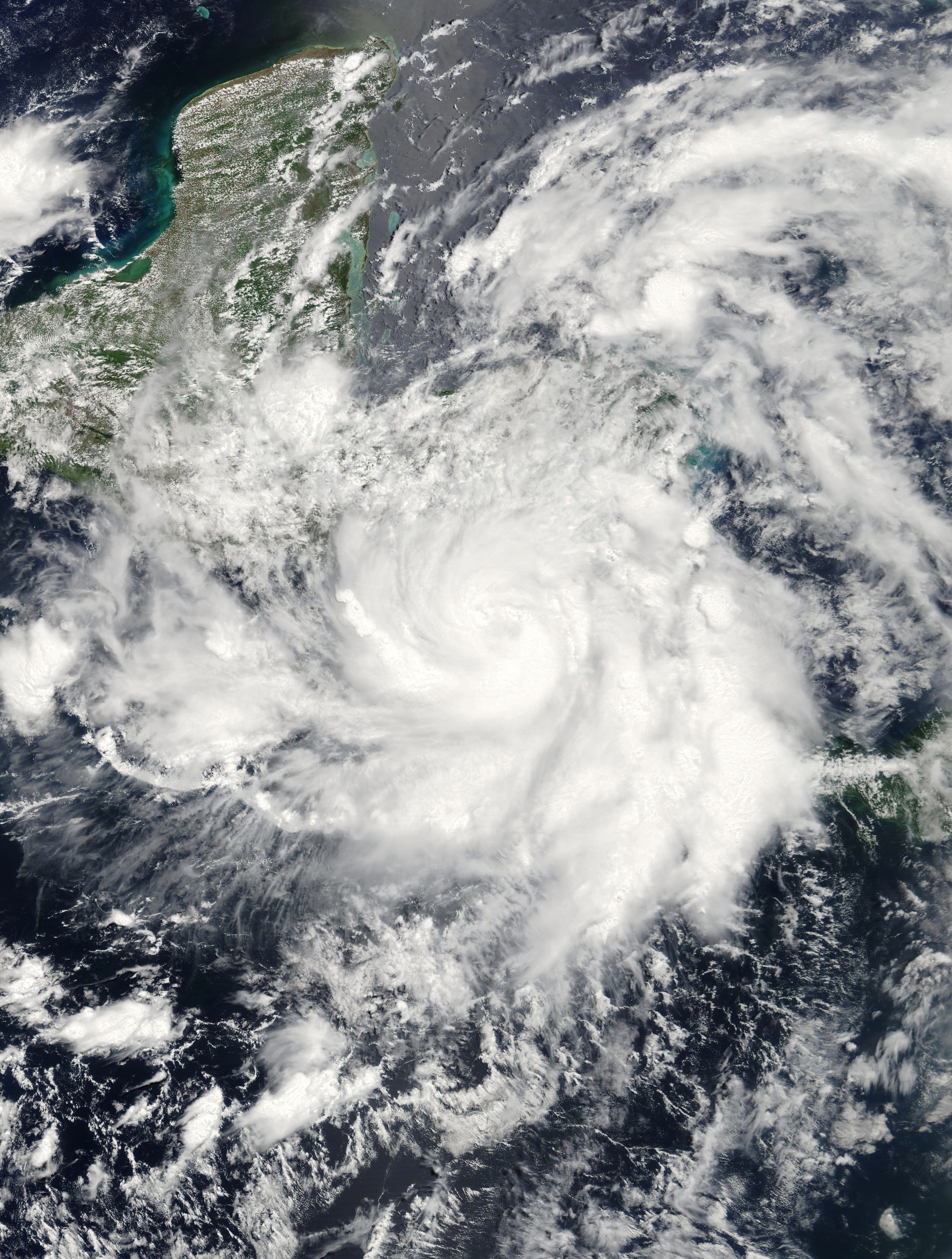
- Tropical Storms Alma (left) and Arthur (right) on May 29 and 31 respectively

Meteorological history
- as Tropical Storm Alma
- Formed: May 29, 2008
- Dissipated: May 30, 2008

Tropical storm
- 1-minute sustained (SSHWS/NWS)
- Highest winds: 65 mph (100 km/h)
- Lowest pressure: 994 mbar (hPa); 29.35 inHg

Meteorological history
- as Tropical Storm Arthur
- Formed: May 31, 2008
- Remnant low: June 1, 2008
- Dissipated: June 6, 2008

Tropical storm
- 1-minute sustained (SSHWS/NWS)
- Highest winds: 45 mph (75 km/h)
- Lowest pressure: 1004 mbar (hPa); 29.65 inHg

Overall effects
- Fatalities: 20 total
- Damage: $113 million (2008 USD)
- Areas affected: Central America, Mexico
- IBTrACS: Alma, Arthur
- Part of the 2008 Atlantic and Pacific hurricane seasons

Tropical Storm Alma and Tropical Storm Arthur were two related, consecutive tropical cyclones that affected Central America and southern Mexico in May and June 2008. Alma became the easternmost forming Pacific tropical cyclone on record when it formed on May 29, just off the coast of Costa Rica. It originated within within the monsoon trough, and was initially forecast to remain a weak tropical storm. Alma rapidly strengthened and developed an eye, before making landfall on May 29 in Nicaragua, near León, with peak winds of 65 mph (105 km/h). It was the first tropical storm on record to strike the Pacific coast of Nicaragua. In Costa Rica, heavy rainfall caused flooding and landslides, killing two and causing $35 million (USD) in damage. Three people were killed in Nicaragua, one from drowning and two others from electrocution. Five others died in Honduras from an aviation accident likely related to the storm and one other was swept away in floodwaters.

Alma degenerated into a remnant low on May 30, before merging with another approaching tropical wave in the Gulf of Honduras shortly afterward. On the next day, the resulting system developed into Tropical Storm Arthur just off the east coast of Belize. It was the first Atlantic tropical storm that formed during the month of May since 1981. It dissipated two days later over the Yucatán Peninsula in Mexico. Arthur and its remnants triggered severe flooding which killed a reported nine people and affected 100,000 more in Belize. Damage was light to moderate, estimated at $78 million (2008 USD).

== Meteorological history ==
=== Alma ===
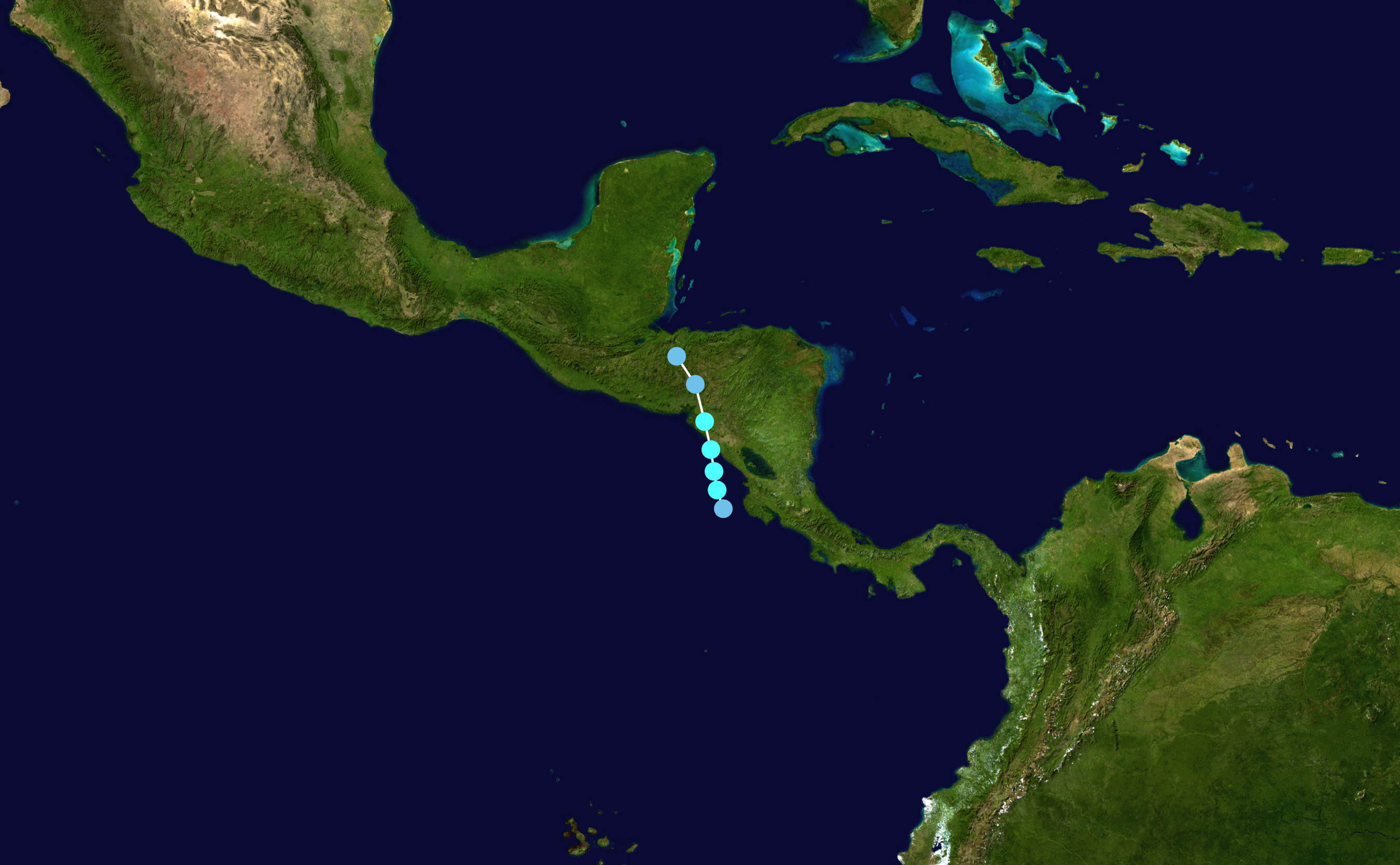
Map plotting the storm's track and intensity, according to the Saffir–Simpson scale Map key Saffir–Simpson scale Tropical depression (≤38 mph, ≤62 km/h) Tropical storm (39–73 mph, 63–118 km/h) Category 1 (74–95 mph, 119–153 km/h) Category 2 (96–110 mph, 154–177 km/h) Category 3 (111–129 mph, 178–208 km/h) Category 4 (130–156 mph, 209–251 km/h) Category 5 (≥157 mph, ≥252 km/h) Unknown Storm type Tropical cyclone Subtropical cyclone Extratropical cyclone, remnant low, tropical disturbance, or monsoon depression

Towards the end of May 2008, computer hurricane models forecast the development of a broad low-pressure area to the southwest of Central America. On May 26, a large trough extended from the southwestern Caribbean Sea across Costa Rica into the eastern Pacific Ocean, forming a broad low-pressure area across the region. A scattered area of strong convection developed, partially in association with the Intertropical Convergence Zone. Located within an area of weak steering currents, the disturbance remained nearly stationary, and on May 27 its shower activity increased in organization. Initially the system consisted of several cyclonic swirls, of which the most pronounced one was located about 340 miles (550 km) west-southwest of San José, Costa Rica. The system gradually became better organized, and with a sufficiently well-developed circulation and convective structure, the National Hurricane Center (NHC) classified the system as Tropical Depression One-E at 0300 UTC on May 29, about 105 miles (169 km) west-northwest of Cabo Blanco, Costa Rica. Forming at 86.5ºW, Alma developed farther east than any other Pacific tropical cyclone on record. Alma made landfall farther east than any other Pacific tropical cyclone, and it was the only to do so on the Pacific coast of Nicaragua and Honduras.

With a mid-level ridge located in the Gulf of Mexico, the depression drifted generally northward through an area of warm water temperatures and low wind shear. Initially its convection was weak and confined to a few rainbands far from the center. As such, intensification was not expected beyond minimal tropical storm status. However, the system quickly developed intense thunderstorms near the center with increased banding in its southern semicircle, and at 1500 UTC on May 29, the NHC upgraded the depression to Tropical Storm Alma, about 55 miles (89 km) southwest of Managua, Nicaragua. This marked one of the rare cases in the Eastern Pacific in which a tropical cyclone formed without the involvement of a tropical wave. The system's intensity was set at 45 mph (72 km/h), and the storm was forecast to intensity only slightly more before moving ashore. However, one hour after it was upgraded to tropical storm status, the NHC re-assessed the intensity as 65 mph (105 km/h), citing updated observations from satellite imagery and QuikSCAT. An eye feature formed, surrounded by a very tight ring of convection, and at around 1900 UTC on May 29, Alma made landfall near León, Nicaragua as a strong tropical storm. The storm quickly weakened after moving ashore, though a small area of thunderstorms persisted as it crossed into the mountainous region of southern Honduras. After passing near Tegucigalpa Alma weakened to tropical depression status, and at 1500 UTC on May 30, the cyclone's low-level circulation center dissipated, while the system was situated near the border of Honduras and Guatemala.

=== Arthur ===
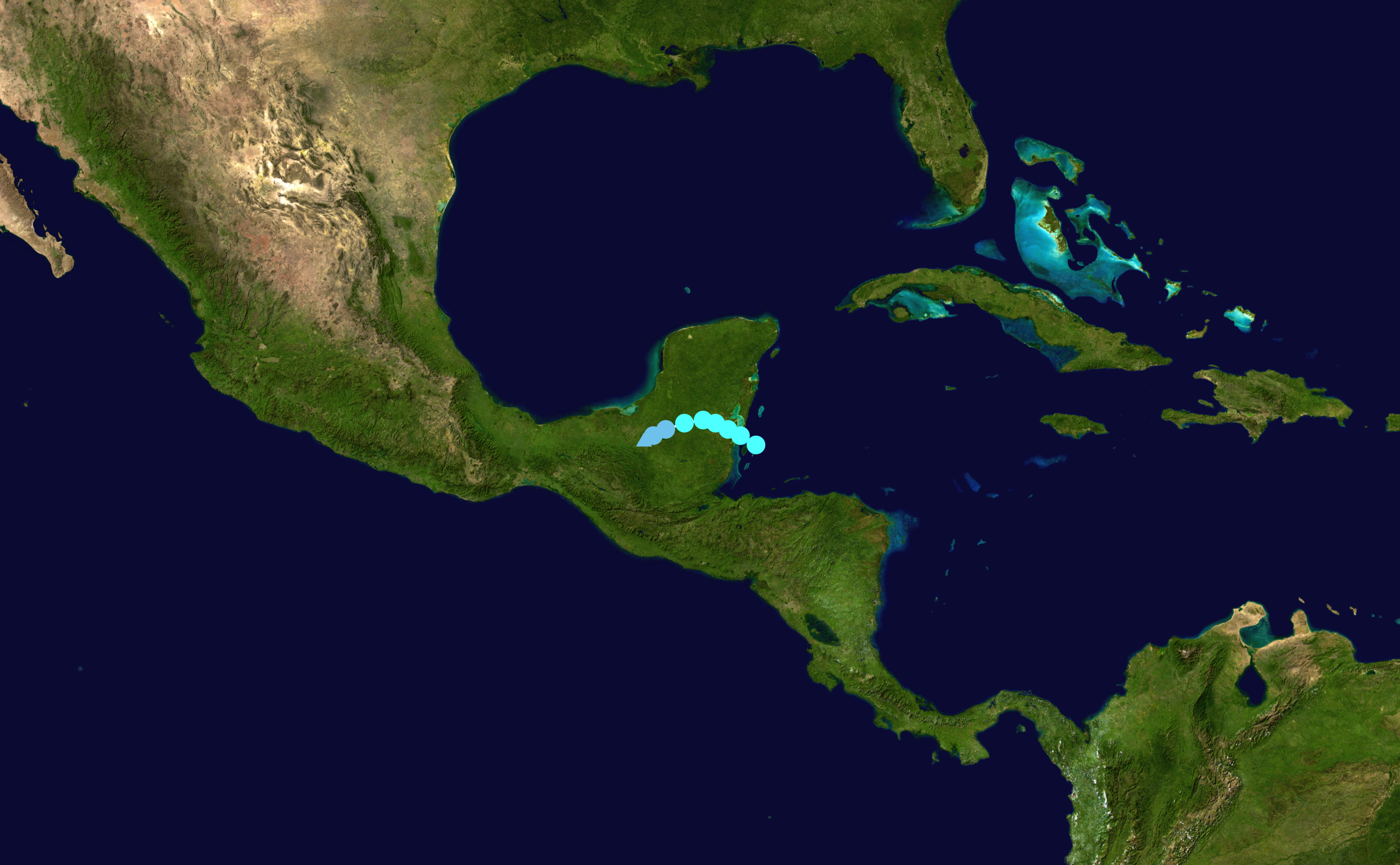
Map plotting the storm's track and intensity, according to the Saffir–Simpson scale Map key Saffir–Simpson scale Tropical depression (≤38 mph, ≤62 km/h) Tropical storm (39–73 mph, 63–118 km/h) Category 1 (74–95 mph, 119–153 km/h) Category 2 (96–110 mph, 154–177 km/h) Category 3 (111–129 mph, 178–208 km/h) Category 4 (130–156 mph, 209–251 km/h) Category 5 (≥157 mph, ≥252 km/h) Unknown Storm type Tropical cyclone Subtropical cyclone Extratropical cyclone, remnant low, tropical disturbance, or monsoon depression

By May 29, 2008, the western Caribbean Sea became tropically active, due to the presence of two tropical waves and Tropical Storm Alma in the east Pacific Ocean, with the formation of a broad surface low pressure system, as well as clusters of atmospheric convection. The next day deep tropical moisture was pulled into the region as Alma made landfall on Nicaragua. Upper level outflow was spreading outwards from the tropical storm with a high pressure system over the Caribbean. A surface trough developed and extended from inland Honduras to just south of the Cayman Islands, which sparked further development of strong convection. Later that day, the remnants of Alma merged with another tropical wave in the western Caribbean, which sparked the development of a new surface low.

On May 31, the merged system was situated along the coast of Belize as a 1004 mbar low-pressure system. A broad upper-level ridge was anchored over the Gulf of Honduras, which covered the entire region and maintained deep tropical moisture. Satellite imagery and a NOAA buoy reported sustained tropical storm-force winds. Despite moving ashore, the system was named Tropical Storm Arthur about 45 mi (72 km) north-northwest of Belize City. In post-analysis, it was determined that Arthur had developed more than 12 hours earlier, late on May 30, and made landfall early on May 31 with 45 mph (75 km/h) winds in northeastern Belize. While over land, Arthur maintained minimal tropical storm force winds, concentrated primarily over open waters to the east and northeast. Despite being over land for several hours, the storm maintained a fairly organized structure. The storm contained a large low-level center, accompanied by convective banding, and was developing new convective cells. Initially, it was thought Arthur would continue generally westward due to a ridge to its north, and later re-intensify in the Bay of Campeche.

The associated thunderstorm activity became separated from the center of circulation, and early on June 1, the center became difficult to locate due to becoming disorganized. It remained a tropical storm over land for nearly 24 hours before weakening to a tropical depression later that day. While drifting southwestward over land, Arthur weakened further, and the National Hurricane Center issued its last advisory on the system late on June 1. By June 4, the remnants of Arthur were diminishing over southeastern Mexico without any redevelopment. Thunderstorms briefly redeveloped two days later, as its associated circulation crossed over the Bay of Campeche into Veracruz, although it dissipated soon after.

== Preparations ==
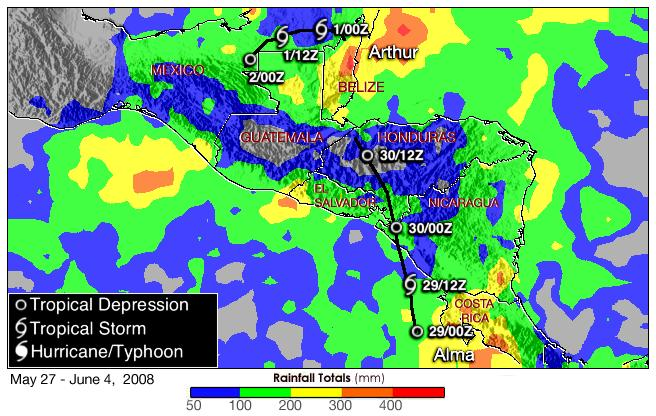
Rainfall from Alma and Arthur

Coinciding with the first advisory on the depression, the government of Costa Rica issued a tropical storm warning for the entire Pacific coast of the country. About four hours prior to landfall, when Alma was named, a tropical storm warning was in effect for the entire coastlines of Costa Rica, Nicaragua, Honduras, and El Salvador. When it was realized the storm was much stronger than previously thought, a hurricane warning was issued for the coasts of Nicaragua and Honduras, and Alma was forecast to attain hurricane status. Prior to moving ashore, the NHC warned that the storm could produce up to 20 inches (510 mm) of rainfall, resulting in mudslides and flash flooding. The National Emergency Commission of Costa Rica activated emergency shelters prior to the arrival of the storm; 250 people in Parrita evacuated from their homes. In Nicaragua, officials evacuated about 5,000 people, while 3,000 troops were mobilized to assist in the aftermath of the storm.

In preparation for the storm, ports were closed in the Mexican state of Quintana Roo, while residents and tourists were encouraged to take precautions in coastal areas. Also, ports were closed on the islands of Cozumel, Isla Mujeres and in Chetumal. Small boats were restricted from leaving some ports. Tropical storm warnings were issued as soon as the storm was first classified for the coast of Belize and the coast of Mexico south of Cabo Catoche, and remained in effect until Arthur weakened to a tropical depression.

== Impact ==
Striking Central America, Alma produced heavy rainfall across its track. The city of David, Chiriquí in western Panama reported 5.75 inches (146 mm) of precipitation in 48 hours. Additionally, the capital city of San José, Costa Rica reported 3.07 inches (78 mm) of rainfall in a 48‑hour period. In Costa Rica, the precipitation caused river flooding, threatening 17 communities. It also caused widespread mudslides, which closed at least eight roads. The storm downed trees and power lines, leaving about 42,000 people without electricity in the country. Two deaths were reported in the country, and damage in Costa Rica was estimated at ₡20 billion colónes ($35 million 2008 USD). In León near where it moved ashore in Nicaragua, the passage of Alma left the city without power. Several buildings were destroyed in the city, and some roads were damaged. Much of the departments of León and Chinandega experienced power outages, due to the strong winds. One person died from electrocution, due to a downed high-tension cable, and another person died in a similar manner. Offshore, one person drowned when he rode out the storm in his boat. In Tegucigalpa, TACA Flight 390 skidded off a runway sodden by torrential rain, killing three passengers (plus two more on the ground) and injuring over eighty. One other fatality was reported in Honduras when a young girl was swept away in a raging stream.

While crossing Belize, Arthur dropped heavy rainfall, estimated as high as 15 in (380 mm). The storm produced rainfall as far south as Belize City and kicked up strong surf on the island of Ambergris Caye. The storm's remnants, combined with recent heavy rains from Tropical Storm Alma, triggered flash flooding and caused rivers in southern and northern Belize to overflow. The flooding damaged one bridge and one highway, and several other bridges were under water. One village was evacuated, and shelters in Corozal and Orange Walk were opened. In rural areas the electricity was cut off due to safety issues. Dozens were stranded on their roof due to high water, and work to repair an important highway was halted when flood waters washed away the repaired section. Papaya plantations, shrimp farms and rice crops were also affected by the unsettled weather. In all, about 100,000 people were affected by the flooding, and nine fatalities were reported; five of which were directly attributed to Arthur. A total of 714 houses were damaged, and damage in Belize was estimated at $78 million (2008 USD). British helicopters helped rescue stranded people following the storm, and Mexico provided a helicopter to help carry supplies to areas affected by the flooding. Prime Minister Dean Barrow declared a disaster area in southern Belize's Stann Creek Valley. Additionally, the government rushed food, water and clothing to about 13,000 people. When Arthur later moved over Mexico, it dropped heavy rainfall, with a maximum 24-hour total of 8.34 in (212 mm) in Pijijiapan, Chiapas. Winds from Arthur forced the closure of two of Mexico's three main oil exporting ports in the Gulf of Mexico due to rough seas.

== Aftermath ==
In April 2009, the World Meteorological Organization retired the name Alma from its rotating name lists on account of the heavy rain and strong winds that impacted Central America. It was replaced with Amanda for the 2014 season.

== See also ==
- Tropical Storm Allison - The first tropical storm to have its name retired in the Atlantic
- List of off-season Atlantic hurricanes
- Tropical storms Amanda and Cristobal
