= Joaquín Villalobos =

Salvadorian politician

- Nickname: Atilio
- Born: 1951 (age 74–75); San Salvador, El Salvador
- Allegiance: People's Revolutionary Army (1973-1992); Farabundo Martí National Liberation Front (1992-1995)
- Rank: Commander in Chief (leader)
- Conflicts: Salvadoran Civil War

Joaquín Villalobos (born 1951 in San Salvador) is a former Salvadoran guerrilla leader and politician. He is alleged to have been involved in the murder of the Salvadoran poet Roque Dalton.

Villalobos was one of the main leaders of the People's Revolutionary Army, or Ejército Revolucionario del Pueblo, a group that emerged in El Salvador in the early 1970s as a loose federation of cells with roots in various Marxist and left-wing Catholic groups. The ERP was one of the five organizations that joined together in 1980 to form the Farabundo Martí National Liberation Front during the Salvadoran Civil War, in which left-wing guerrillas fought El Salvador’s military-dominated and US-backed right-wing government. An economics student and left-wing activist, Villalobos joined the ERP in 1971, at the age of 19.

== People's Revolutionary Army ==
In 1975, Alejandro Rivas Mira and other members supported the political trial that culminated in the assassination of the poet Roque Dalton. At the time, Alejandro Rivas Mira was the top leader of the People’s Revolutionary Army (ERP). He had a rivalry with Roque Dalton, who advocated for the creation of a political party that would control the ERP’s armed organization. This proposal was displeasing to Rivas Mira, who had a more militaristic mindset and favored waging a war. The death sentence was approved by two members of the war tribunal: Vladimir Rogel and Joaquín Villalobos. However, it is still unknown who actually shot Dalton. Nearly 18 years after the assassination of the revolutionary poet, journalist Juan José Dalton — Roque’s son — interviewed Villalobos, who described the killing as “unjust, a youthful mistake, the most serious one I made.” Juan José Dalton rejected this explanation, arguing that “accepting it would mean admitting that that stage of life — youth — is potentially criminal, which is not acceptable.”

The ERP under his leadership has been described as “the most efficient military organisation on the Salvadoran left” during the civil war, with Villalobos developing a “reputation for brash strategic brilliance”. The Financial Times described Villalobos as "The true master of 20th-century Latin American guerrilla warfare", above Che Guevara.

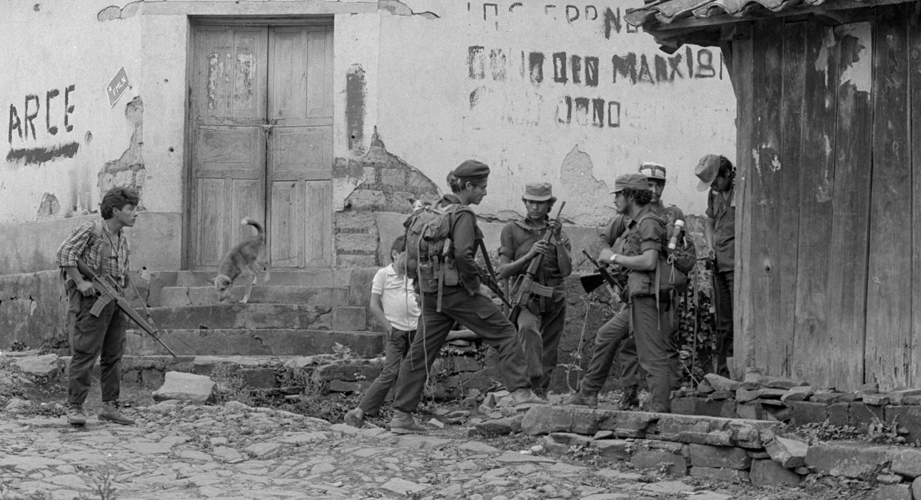
ERP combatants Perquín 1990.

He subsequently played a major role in the negotiations that ended the civil war, presenting himself as the conciliatory face of the ERP. In 1992, the year in which the peace agreement was signed, The New York Times described him as a “feared military commander with a reputation for ruthlessness”, but also noted his admission of errors in the rebels’ tactics and his stated regret for many of the killings they had been involved in.

As a result of the 1992 peace accords, the FMLN was legalized as a political party. Villalobos remained a member until 1995, when he and other former leaders of the ERP split from the FMLN to form a new centrist political party, the Democratic Party, which signed a deal with the then government accepting a series of neoliberal reforms.

In the 1990s, Villalobos went to England to study at St Antony's College, Oxford on a scholarship funded by the British Foreign Office. He obtained a Master's Degree from St Antony's College and is now a visiting scholar there. Villalobos became an outspoken critic of the left in Latin American countries.

Villalobos has advised various governments and politicians on security and conflict resolution. He has served as a consultant on peacemaking efforts in countries including Colombia, Mexico, Sri Lanka, Philippines, Afghanistan, Bosnia, and Northern Ireland. He has also advised the UN, served as an advisor to the Center of Cooperation Initiatives for Development at the University of Alcalá de Henares and as a member of the Inter-American Dialogue in Washington DC, USA. Villalobos has also been asked for his advice with respect to Islamic State.

In 2015, Villalobos was named one of the fifty most influential Ibero-American intellectuals. In December 2016, Villalobos, along with Jonathan Powell, Bill Ury and Shlomo Ben-Ami, was awarded a medal by President Juan Manuel Santos of Colombia, in recognition of his contribution to the successful Colombian peace process.
