= Guazapa (volcano) =

Volcano in El Salvador

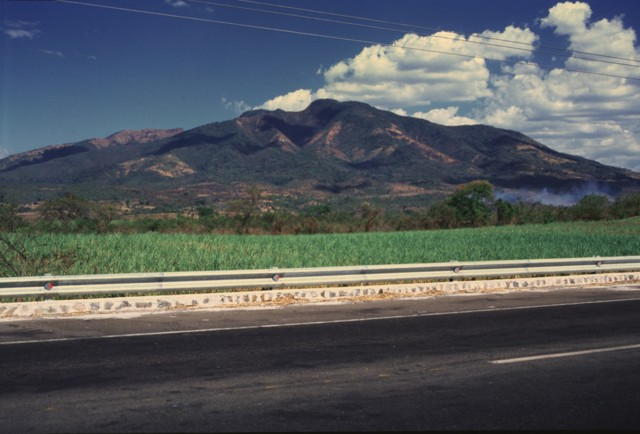
- Guazapa volcano in 1999

Highest point
- Elevation: 1,438 m (4,718 ft)
- Coordinates: 13°54′N 89°07′W

Geography
- Location within El Salvador
- Location: El Salvador

Geology
- Mountain type: Stratovolcano
- Volcanic arc: Central America Volcanic Arc
- Last eruption: Unknown

Guazapa is a stratovolcano in central El Salvador. Guazapa volcano an eroded basaltic stratovolcano 23 km NE of San Salvador city. It is not known whether the Pleistocene volcano is still active. It shows signs of intense erosion that have cut deep valleys into its flanks, suggesting a very long dormancy period, and there is no crater morphology left.

During the civil war of the 1980s, Guazapa was one of the main strongholds of the FMLN guerillas. The Guazapa mountains have clandestine cemeteries, bomb shelters, guerilla camps, and makeshift hospitals.

== See also ==
- List of volcanoes in El Salvador
- List of stratovolcanoes
