= Fermán Cienfuegos =

Salvadoran former guerrilla leader

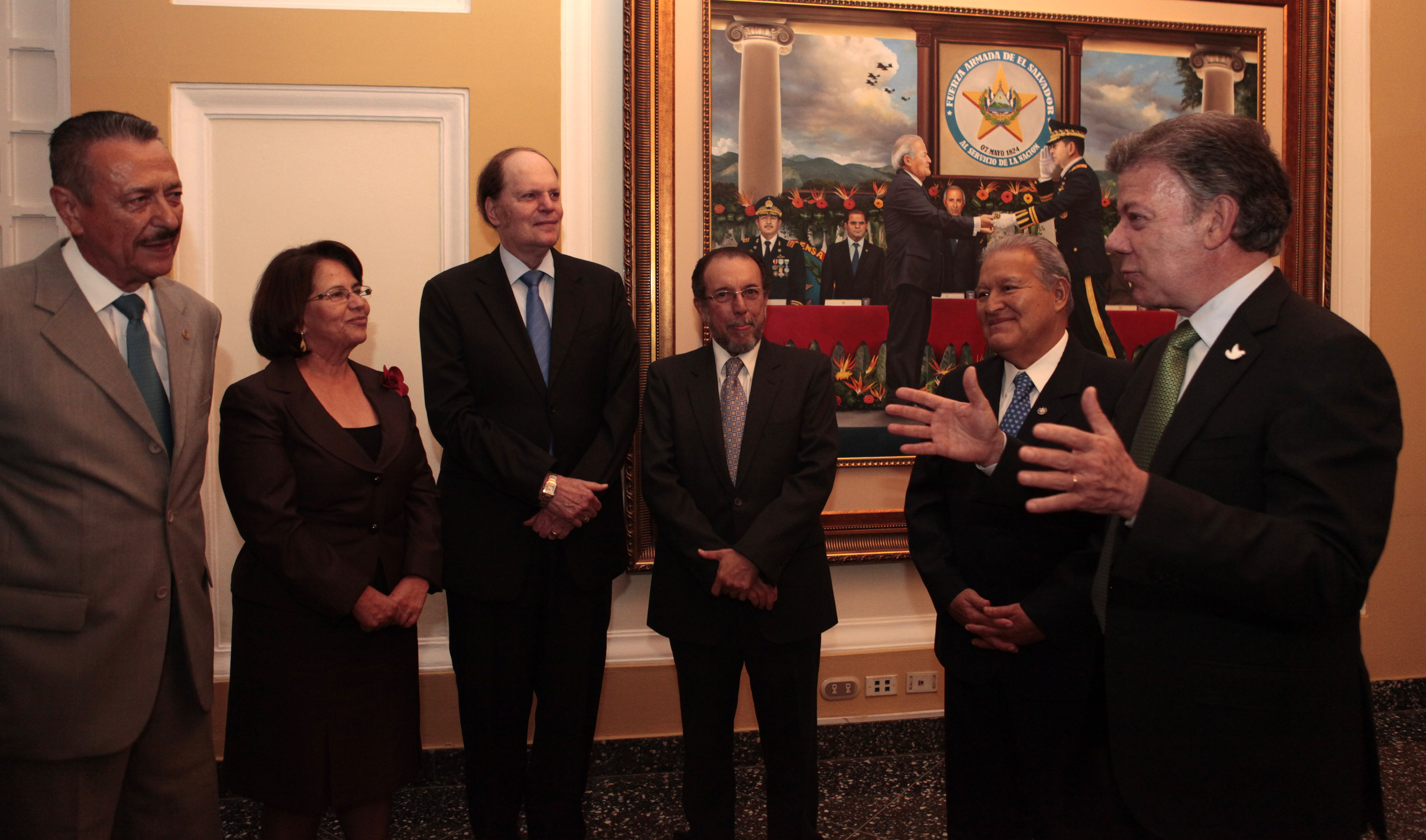
- Eduardo Sancho on the left
- Born: José Eduardo Sancho Castañeda; 6 March 1947 (age 79); San José, Costa Rica
- Military career
- Allegiance: Farabundo Martí National Liberation Front
- Branch: National Resistance
- Commands: National Resistance Armed Forces
- Conflicts: Salvadoran Civil War: Final offensive of 1981

José Eduardo Sancho Castañeda (born 6 March 1947), better known by his nom de guerre Fermán Cienfuegos, was the leader of the Salvadoran organization National Resistance Armed Forces (FARN), which was a part of National Resistance (RN).

== Biography ==
José Eduardo Sancho Castañeda was born on 6 March 1947 in San José, Costa Rica. His parents were Guillermo Sancho Colombari and Liliam Castañeda Saldívar. His parents met in El Salvador in 1942 when Sancho Colombari went to the country to study medicine. Sancho Castañeda attended the Central American University.

Sancho Castañeda was influenced by leftists in Costa Rica, including Manuel Mora Valverde, the leader of the People's Vanguard Party whom he considered to be a close friend. There, he also began to read texts written by Karl Marx. He opposed the Football War fought between the governments of El Salvador and Honduras in 1969.

The RN was founded in 1975 as a split from the People's Revolutionary Army (ERP) after an internal struggle within the ERP resulted in the assassination of a group of ERP leaders including famed Salvadoran poet Roque Dalton who advocated that the ERP should not have such a largely militarist focus and should do more organizing among the masses.

In 1980, the RN was one of the five revolutionary Marxist organizations that formed the Farabundo Martí National Liberation Front (FMLN) that fought an armed struggle against the Salvadoran government. As the leader of the RN, Cienfuegos was one of the leaders of the final offensive of 1981 and was one of the signatories of the 1992 Salvadoran peace accords.
