= Chairman of the Joint Chiefs of Staff (Honduras) =

Highest ranking position in the Armed Forces of Honduras

- Jefe del Estado Mayor Conjunto
- Incumbent; Roosevelt Leonel Hernández Aguilar since 11 December 2023
- Joint Chiefs of Staff
- Member of: Board of commanders
- Reports to: Minister of Defence
- Appointer: National Congress

The Chairman of the Joint Chiefs of Staff (Spanish: Jefe del Estado Mayor Conjunto de las Fuerzas Armadas de Honduras) is the professional head of the Honduran Armed Forces. They are responsible for the administration and operational control of the military. Until 1999, the position was known as Commander-in-chief of the Armed Forces.

== List of officeholders ==
=== Commander-in-chief of the Armed Forces (–1999) ===
| No. | Portrait | Name (born–died) | Term of office | | | Defence branch | Ref. |
| No. | Portrait | Name (born–died) | Took office | Left office | Time in office | Defence branch | Ref. |
|---|---|---|---|---|---|---|---|
| | | Brigadier general Oswaldo López Arellano (1921–2010) | 1963 | 1970 | 6–7 years | Army | |
| | | Brigadier general Oswaldo López Arellano (1921–2010) | 1972 | 1975 | 2–3 years | Army | |
| | | Brigadier general Juan Alberto Melgar Castro (1930–1987) | 1975 | 1978 | 2–3 years | Army | |
| | | Divisional general Policarpo Paz García (1932–2000) | 7 August 1978 | 27 January 1980 | 1 year, 173 days | Army | |
| | | Brigadier general Gustavo Álvarez Martínez (1937–1989) | 1981 | March 1984 | 2–3 years | Army | |
| | | Brigadier general Walter López Reyes (1940–2022) | 31 March 1984 | 1 February 1986 | 1 year, 307 days | Air Force | |
| | | Brigadier general Humberto Regalado Hernández (1936–2016) | 14 February 1986 | January 1990 | 3 years, 10 months | Navy | |
| | | Brigadier general Arnulfo Cantarero López (–2020) | January 1990 | December 1990 | 11 months | Army | |
| | | Brigadier general Luis Alonso Discua Elvir | December 1990 | 1995 | 4–5 years | Army | |
| | | Brigadier general Mario Raúl Hung Pacheco | 1996 | 29 January 1999 | 2–3 years | Army | |

=== Chairman of the Joint Chiefs of Staff (1999–present) ===
| No. | Portrait | Name (born–died) | Term of office | | | Defence branch | Ref. |
| No. | Portrait | Name (born–died) | Took office | Left office | Time in office | Defence branch | Ref. |
|---|---|---|---|---|---|---|---|
| 1 | | Brigadier general Eugenio Romero Euceda | 29 January 1999 | 2000 | 0–1 years | Army | |
| 2 | | Brigadier general Daniel López Carballo | 2000 | 2002 | 1–2 years | Army | |
| 3 | | Brigadier general José Isaías Barahona Herrera (born 1954) | 2002 | 11 January 2005 | 2–3 years | Army | |
| 4 | | Brigadier general Romeo Vásquez Velásquez (born 1957) | 11 January 2005 | 10 January 2010 (Note: Fired on 24 June 2009, during the 2009 Honduran constitutional crisis. Reinstated after one day by the Supreme Court.) | 4 years, 165 days | Army | |
| 5 | | Divisional general Carlos Antonio Cuellar | 10 January 2010 | 28 January 2011 | 1 year, 18 days | Army | |
| 6 | | Brigadier general René Arnoldo Osorio Canales | 28 January 2011 | 22 December 2013 | 2 years, 328 days | Army | |
| 7 | | Brigadier general Fredy Santiago Díaz Zelaya | 22 December 2013 | 21 December 2015 | 1 year, 364 days | Army | |
| 8 | | Brigadier general Francisco Isaías Álvarez Urbina | 21 December 2015 | 21 December 2017 | 2 years, 0 days | Army | |
| 9 | | Divisional general René Orlando Ponce Fonseca | 21 December 2017 | 20 December 2019 | 1 year, 364 days | Army | |
| 10 | | Divisional general Tito Livio Moreno Coello | 20 December 2019 | 21 December 2021 | 2 years, 1 day | Army | |
| 11 | | Vice admiral José Jorge Fortín Aguilar | 21 December 2021 | 27 December 2023 | 2 years, 6 days | Navy | |
| 12 | | Divisional general Roosevelt Hernández | 27 December 2023 | Incumbent | 2 years, 254 days | Army | |
