= Salvadoran Green Cross =

Humanitarian aid organization in El Salvador

- Cruz Verde Salvadoreña
- Abbreviation: CVS
- Established: 1970; 56 years ago
- Founders: José Luis Salazar; Godofredo González; Alexander Funes; Douglas Martínez
- Type: Nonprofit, NGO
- Headquarters: El Salvador
- Region served: El Salvador
- Website: cruzverdesv.org

The Salvadoran Green Cross (Spanish: Cruz Verde Salvadoreña) is a humanitarian aid organization located in El Salvador.

== History ==
The Salvadoran Green Cross was established in 1970 by José Luis Salazar, Godofredo González, Alexander Funes, and Douglas Martínez.

During the Salvadoran Civil War, the Salvadoran Green Cross established refugee camps for people fleeing the violence of the civil war. Beginning in 1984, the Salvadoran Green Cross began cooperation with the government-operated National Commission for Assistance to Displaced Persons (CONADES) in assisting people who were displaced by the civil war.
