= People's Revolutionary Army (El Salvador) =

Left-wing militant and political organization in El Salvador from 1970 to 1992

- Ejército Revolucionario del Pueblo
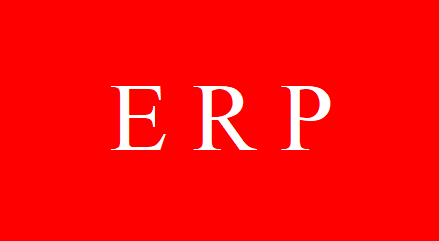
- Leaders: Alejandro Rivas Mira (1970-1976); Joaquín Villalobos (1976-1992)
- Dates active: 1970–1992
- Country: El Salvador
- Allegiance: FMLN
- Active regions: 10 departments of El Salvador, especially in northern Morazán
- Ideology: Marxism–Leninism; Socialism; Liberation theology
- Political position: Far-left
- Wars: Salvadoran Civil War

The People's Revolutionary Army (ERP) was a political-military organization in El Salvador. It was one of the five revolutionary left-wing armed groups that formed, in 1980, the Farabundo Martí National Liberation Front (FMLN). The ERP is considered the most violent, best organized, and most prepared guerrilla group that has existed on the American continent to date, even surpassing the Cuban, Nicaraguan, and Colombian guerrillas due to its tactics, execution of complex operations during the Salvadoran Civil War, various victories in battle, pragmatic leadership, and experience in fighting the Armed Forces of El Salvador, who were trained in combat by the United States.

The origin of the ERP lies in "El Grupo", an armed organization formed by university students such as Rafael Arce Zablah, Alejandro Rivas Mira, Joaquín Villalobos, Ana Guadalupe Martínez, Lil Milagro Ramírez, Eduardo Sancho Castañeda, and Mercedes Letona. In 1971, they kidnapped and killed businessman Ernesto Regalado Dueñas in one of the first armed actions by the left in the country. "El Grupo" was composed of former members of the University Youth and the Youth of the Christian Democratic Party of El Salvador, who had decided that armed struggle was the only alternative to confront the military-oligarchic regime of El Salvador.

== History ==
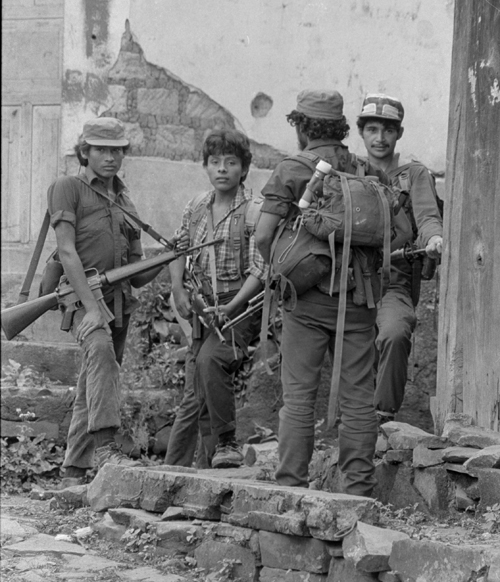
ERP combatants 1990

Foundation and Internal Division

The ERP made its public debut on March 2, 1972, with the annihilation operation against two agents of the now-defunct National Guard in San Salvador. In 1973, the poet Roque Dalton joined the organization. The ERP was born from the union of collectives of Christian left-wing militants: young social democrats, Christian democrats and socially Christian university students. Over the following years, the ERP began to strengthen and build its guerrilla command structure by carrying out recruitment work in the rural areas of eastern El Salvador.

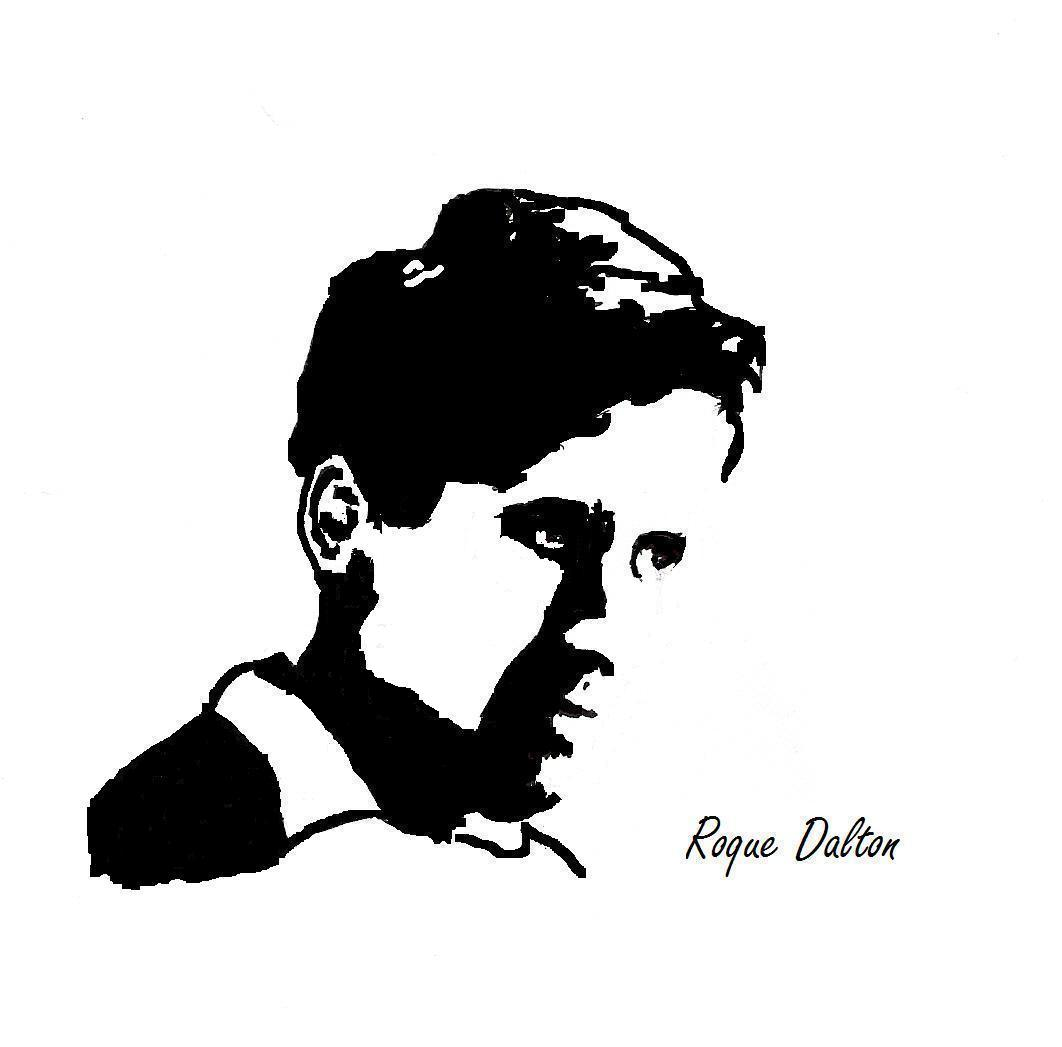
Illustration of Roque Dalton.

Between 1974 and 1975, the ERP underwent a deep internal debate about methods of struggle and internal leadership, mainly between Alejandro Rivas Mira (whose pseudonym was Sebastián Urquilla) and Roque Dalton, which culminated in the treacherous execution of the poet under a political trial on May 10, 1975. This act consolidated Rivas Mira as the top leader of the ERP. On September 26, 1975, Rafael Arce Zablah, the organization’s ideologue, died in combat. His death occurred after he was wounded during the retreat from the occupation of El Carmen, in La Unión Department.

In 1976, the ERP announced the defection of Alejandro Rivas Mira, and Joaquín Villalobos (Commander Atilio) assumed the position of General Secretary of the organization. The ERP’s political wing was the Salvadoran Revolutionary Party, which evolved in response to the needs of Salvadoran society.

=== Growth and the Beginning of the Civil War ===
On January 20, 1979, ERP members carried out “Operation Long Live the Martyrs of January 20,” in which they planted explosives at the Departmental Government Office of San Miguel, the Ministry of Labor offices, a taxi, and the headquarters of Orden and OMCOM, causing only material damage.

In 1979, the first contacts began between leftist political-military organizations to form a unified front. On October 10, 1980, the FMLN (Farabundo Martí National Liberation Front) was founded. In January 1981, the FMLN launched its first military offensive. After the offensive failed, guerrilla groups retreated to rural areas amid widespread repression in several Salvadoran cities. During the war, the ERP established its main bases in the departments of Usulután, Morazán, and San Miguel. One of its most successful military strategies was the operation of the Rafael Arce Zablah Brigade (BRAZ), which became the Special Forces of the ERP/FMLN. This unit achieved major milestones, such as the capture of Cacahuatique Volcano, where the army's strategic communication systems were located—designed by U.S. advisors and previously declared "impenetrable."

The ERP also maintained guerrilla forces in the paracentral region of El Salvador, on the San Salvador volcano, with urban command units in the metropolitan area of the capital and Guazapa volcano.

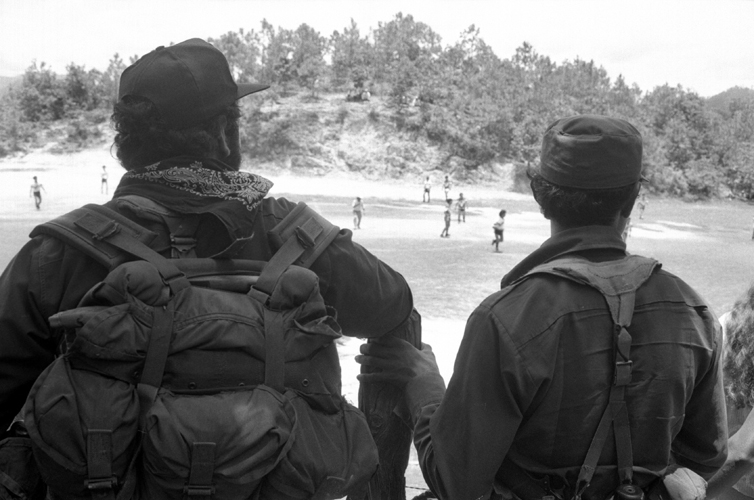
Leaders in Perquín, El Salvador 1990.

=== Intensification of the Conflict ===
It is important to highlight that the ERP was one of the best-organized guerrilla groups within the FMLN, and it was even recognized by the CIA for the effective guerrilla tactics it employed—tactics that led to various combat victories against the army and the execution of complex special operations on the battlefield. Furthermore, the ERP was one of the organizations that used cultural tools as a method to spread its political ideas. Among these efforts was the founding of Radio Venceremos, a fully guerrilla-operated radio station owned by the ERP that broadcast on shortwave three times a day, with its main program airing daily at 6:00 PM. The station also became the official voice of the FMLN, which coordinated five guerrilla groups into a single combat front. During this period, the ERP also published its propaganda organ titled "El Combatiente".

One of the most significant attacks carried out by ERP members took place at the Ilopango Air Force Base on January 27, 1982, where approximately ten soldiers were killed, and guerrilla fighters destroyed 70% of the Salvadoran army’s vehicles through gunfire or explosions. Although the operation was led in the field by guerrilla fighter Doré Castro, alias "Samuel", it was entirely planned by Alejandro Montenegro. Doré Castro died in combat nearly a year later at Cerro Guazapa. After his death, the younger members of the special forces began calling themselves "Samuelitos" in his honor. In late 1982, Alejandro Arquímedes Montenegro was captured in Tegucigalpa, Honduras, while en route to Nicaragua. In April 1984, Bruno Caballero, alias "Commander Quincho", died in combat. On December 17, 1985, Jorge Meléndez, known as "Commander Jonás", delivered his speech titled "Building a Sea of Guerrilla Warfare," which was broadcast on Radio Venceremos.

=== Child Soldiers ===
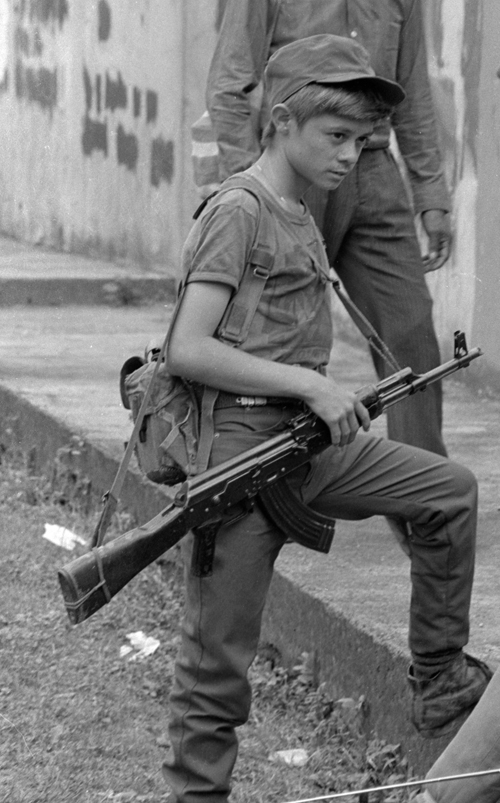
ERP combatants in Perquín, El Salvador, July 1990

The ERP recruited and used children during the Salvadoran Civil War. A 1989 U.S. Department of State report stated that captured FMLN documents showed that the ERP, along with the FPL, organized children aged 9–15 into "pioneer squads"; the report also documented the use of children as couriers and spotters and reports of children being kidnapped for recruitment. Photographs taken by Linda Hess Miller in Perquín in July 1990 document ERP combatants, including children carrying weapons.

=== Signing of the Peace Accords and Subsequent Events ===
In 1992, following the signing of the Chapultepec Peace Accords, the ERP demobilized its guerrilla forces and participated in the 1994 presidential and legislative elections as part of the FMLN, which, in accordance with the peace agreement, had been transformed into a legal political party. After the elections, the ERP and the RN adopted a social democratic ideology and separated from the FMLN to jointly form a new political party called the Democratic Party (PD).

In May 1993, Joaquín Villalobos was interviewed alongside Juan José Dalton, son of Roque Dalton, in the Mexican newspaper Excélsior. In the interview, they discussed the origins of the ERP and the guerrilla movement in El Salvador, and how Villalobos rose through the ranks of the armed struggle. He also reflected on the need for self-criticism, but denied having been one of the direct perpetrators of Roque Dalton’s death.

In June 1993, during the first congress of the Revolutionary Party of El Salvador, and after the Chapultepec Accords had been signed, the People’s Revolutionary Army (ERP) changed its name to People’s Renewed Expression, redirecting its efforts toward peaceful political participation.

== Ideology ==
The ERP adhered to the Cuban strategy of focoism, which believed that a socialist revolution could be inspired by small insurgent groups, thanks to the social, cultural and political significance that the presence and activities of communist guerilla entailed. The party's ideology was described as a synthesis of communism and liberation theology. The organization attracted mostly middle-class youth and women. Many of the organization's members and recruits were formed supporters of the Christian Democratic Party, radicalized through liberation theology. The ERP relied on Catholic student organizations and recruited through "Catholic networks organized by Father Miguel Ventura and organized support in parishes through church networks".

== Leaders ==
Joaquin Villalobos. ERP's main leader and founder was Joaquin Villalobos who came originally from the ACUS. Villalobos's role in the ERP mainly being a military strategists and by playing a crucial role in negotiations during the end the civil war.

Rafael Arce Zablah (Alvarez). Zablah. Zablah was another leader and key activist of ERP that gathered support from local Catholic priests . These communities became an important part of the war by serving as a base for the ERP.

Sebastian Urquilla. Urquilla was founder and leader of the ERP who founded the group named "El Grupo". This is significant because as El grupo was disbanded in 1970, members helped form.

Edgar Alejandro Rivas Mira. Mira was involved in the murder of Roque Dalton and Roberto Poma.

== Claimed Attacks ==
According to the Global Terrorism Database, there have been 65 claimed attacks by the ERP. One of these attacks was a kidnapping in 1977 that included ERP member "Edgar Alejandro Rivas Mira," who kidnapped Roberto Poma and killed his body guards. Poma was a wealthy businessman and President of the Salvadoran Institute of Tourism. The ERP kidnapped him for political and economic reasons as well as to trade him for captured members of the ERP, including commander Ana Guadalupe Martinez. Poma later died from wounds inflicted by the ERP after his release. (IACHR). Another attack by the ERP was the killing of Herbert Ernesto Anaya Sanabria, a leader of the Salvadoran Human Rights Commission. An ERP member, "Jorge Alberto Miranda Arevalo," denied the killing during his trial in 1988 at the First Criminal court of San Salvador. He was later found guilty of murder and acts of terrorism in October 1991 by a jury of five people. (UN Security...)
