= Armed Forces of Honduras =

Combined military forces of Honduras

- Fuerzas Armadas de Honduras (Spanish)
- Coat of arms of the Honduran Armed Forces
- Founded: 1825; 201 years ago
- Service branches: Honduran Army; Honduran Air Force; Honduran Navy; Military Police
- Headquarters: Tegucigalpa
- Website: Official website

Leadership
- Commander-in-Chief: Nasry Asfura
- Minister of Defence: Roosevelt Hernández Aguilar
- Chairman of the Joint Chiefs of Staff: General Roosevelt Hernández Aguilar

Personnel
- Military age: 18 for voluntary 2–3-year service
- Active personnel: 52,225

Expenditure
- Budget: $405,000,000
- Percent of GDP: 1.1% as of 2012

Industry
- Foreign suppliers: Brazil; Colombia; Canada; Czech Republic; European Union; France; India; Israel; Indonesia; Italy; Japan; South Korea; Mexico; Taiwan (formerly); United Kingdom; United States

Related articles
- Ranks: Military ranks of Honduras

The Armed Forces of Honduras (Spanish: Fuerzas Armadas de Honduras) consists of the Honduran Army, Honduran Navy, Honduran Air Force, and Military Police of Public Order.

== History ==
=== Early republican era ===
The Armed Forces of Honduras were created through article 44, subsection 4 of the First Constitution of the Legislative Chamber in 1825, with the First Supreme Head of State being the Attorney Dionisio de Herrera, for which, they ordered the effective birth of the Honduran army in dated December 11, 1825. It was divided into battalions with the name of each of the seven departments Comayagua the capital, Tegucigalpa, Choluteca, Olancho, Yoro, Gracias and Santa Bárbara that were in charge of strategically and tactically covering order and defense of the state, under French military doctrine. In 1831 the Military School was created with a seat at the San Francisco Barracks, and Colonel Narciso Benítez of Colombian origin was appointed director; From this school graduated: Francisco Morazán, José Antonio Márquez, Diego Vigil, Liberato Moncada, Joaquín Rivera and José Santos Guardiola who were presidents of Honduras, among others.

The first weaponry used was flintlocks and gunpowder, The Remington single-load rifle was one of the first bullet rifles that were introduced into the country during the government of General José María Medina.

=== Mid 19th century ===
The second stage of the Armed Forces is between the years 1842 and 1876 when the collective uniform emerged in the mid-1840s when the troops of General José Santos Guardiola faced those of General Nicolás Ángulo, in 1845 in the "Combate del Obrajuelo", in San Miguel, El Salvador.

In 1865 the first attempt was made to organize a Naval Force with its respective regulations; however, the cost of this service made it unsustainable; However, there were several attempts to reactivate the idea. one of them was carried out by Doctor Policarpo Bonilla, who ordered the construction of the Tatumbla steamship in the Kiel shipyard, Germany on November 22, 1895, and then in 1896 respectively, General Manuel Bonilla had the 'Hornet built. While he administered Honduras, the Doctor and General Don Tiburcio Carias Andino also ordered the construction of the steamers Búfalo and El Tigre. On January 1, 1881, the first Military Code of the Honduran army was issued, a legal instrument to govern its own organization.

=== 20th century ===
During the twentieth century, Honduran military leaders frequently became presidents, either through elections or by coups d'état. General Tiburcio Carías Andino was elected in 1932, he later on called a constituent assembly that allowed him to be reelected, and his rule became more authoritarian until an election in 1948.

During the following decades, the military of Honduras carried out several coups d'état, starting in October 1955. General Oswaldo López Arellano carried out the next coup in October 1963 and a second in December 1972, followed by coups in 1975 by Juan Alberto Melgar Castro and in 1978 by Policarpo Paz García.

=== 1980s ===
Events during the 1980s in El Salvador and Nicaragua led Honduras – with US assistance – to expand its armed forces considerably, laying particular emphasis on its air force, which came to include a squadron of US-provided F-5s.

The military unit Battalion 316 carried out political assassinations and the torture of suspected political opponents of the government during this same period. Battalion members received training and support from the United States Central Intelligence Agency, in Honduras, at U.S. military bases and in Chile during the presidency of the dictator Augusto Pinochet. Amnesty International estimated that at least 184 people "disappeared" from 1980 to 1992 in Honduras, most likely due to actions of the Honduran military.

=== 1990s ===
The resolution of the civil wars in El Salvador and Nicaragua, and across-the-board budget cuts made in all ministries, has brought reduced funding for the Honduran Armed Forces. The abolition of the draft has created staffing gaps in the now all-volunteer armed forces. The military is now far below its authorized strength, and further reductions are expected. In January 1999, the Constitution was amended to abolish the position of military Commander-in-Chief of the Armed Forces, thus codifying civilian authority over the Military.

=== 2000s ===
Since 2002, soldiers have been involved in crime prevention and law enforcement, patrolling the streets of the major cities alongside the national police.

==== 2009 ====
On 28 June 2009, in the context of a constitutional crisis, the Military, acting on orders of the Supreme Court of Justice, arrested the President Manuel Zelaya, after which they forcibly removed elected President Zelaya from Honduras. See the article 2009 Honduran constitutional crisis regarding claims regarding legitimacy and illegitimacy of the event, and events preceding and following the removal of Zelaya from Honduras.

The military's chief lawyer, Colonel Herberth Bayardo Inestroza Membreño, made public statements regarding the removal of Zelaya. On June 30, he showed a detention order, apparently signed June 26 by a Supreme Court judge, which ordered the armed forces to detain the president. Colonel Inestroza later stated that deporting Zelaya did not comply with the court order: "In the moment that we took him out of the country, in the way that he was taken out, there is a crime. Because of the circumstances of the moment this crime occurred, there is going to be a justification and cause for acquittal that will protect us." He said the decision was taken by the military leadership "in order to avoid bloodshed".

Following the 2009 ouster of the president, the Honduran military together with other government security forces were allegedly responsible for thousands of allegedly arbitrary detentions and for several forced disappearances and extrajudicial executions of opponents to the de facto government, including members of the Democratic Unification Party. However, evidence about these actions has yet to be provided and there has been some questioning in local media about the actual perpetrators, suggesting that they could actually be related to disputes within the leftists organizations themselves.

== Army ==
The Honduran Army (Spanish: Ejército de Honduras, lit. 'Army of Honduras') is the land service branch of the Armed Forces of Honduras.

- 101st Brigade in Choluteca
- 105th Brigade in San Pedro Sula
- 110th Brigade in Danli
- 115th Brigade in Juticalpa
- 120th Brigade in Santa Rosa de Copan

== Air Force ==
The FAH operates from four air bases located at:

- Hernan Acosta Mejia Air Base at Tegucigalpa
- Soto Cano Air Base at Comayagua,
- Armando Escalon Espinal Air Base at La Lima, Cortés
- Hector Caraccioli Moncada at La Ceiba.

With the exception of Soto Cano Air Base, all other air bases operate as dual civil and military aviation facilities.

Additionally, three air stations are located at:

- Catacamas
- Alto Aguán (bomb range)
- Puerto Lempira airstrips serve as forward operations locations-FOL.

Also a radar station operates at:

- La Mole peak.

== Navy ==
The Navy is a small force dealing with coastal and riverine security.

The Navy has 71 patrol boats, interceptors and landing craft units.

Class	Origin	Type	Versions	In service	Fleet
ISRAEL SHIPYARDS Sa'ar 62-class offshore patrol vessel 62.0 meters / 204 feet	Israel	Ocean patrol vessel	OPV-62M	1	FNH-2021 General Trinidad Cabañas; Delivered by Israel Shipyard and arrived in country December 2019
Damen Stan Patrol Boat; 42.8 meters / 140 feet	Netherlands	Coastal patrol vessel	4207	2	FNH-1401 Lempira; FNH-1402 General Francisco Morazán
LANTANA BOATYARD Guardian Patrol Boats; 32.3 meters / 107 feet	United States	Coastal patrol craft		3	FNH-1071 Tegucigalpa; FNH-1072 Copán; FNH-1073 unknown name
SWIFTSHIPS Patrol Boats; 32.0 meters / 105 feet	United States	Coastal patrol craft		3	FNH-1051 Guaymuras; FNH-1052 Honduras; FNH-1053 Hibueras
IAI Dabur Type Patrol Boat; 26.0 meters / 85 feet	Israel; United States	Coastal patrol craft		1	FNH-8501 Chamelecón
SWIFTSHIPS Patrol Boats; 20.0 meters / 65 feet	United States	Coastal patrol craft		5	FNH 6501 Nacaome; FNH 6502 Goascorán; FNH 6503 Patuca; FNH 6504 Ulúa; FNH 6505 Choluteca
BOSTON WHALER Interceptors BW370; 11.4 meters / 38 feet	United States	Interceptor boat	Guardian class	10	N/A
DAMEN Interceptors 1102 UHS; 11.0 meters / 36 feet	Netherlands	Interceptor boat	1102 UHS	6	FNH-3601 to FNH-3606
SAFE BOATS 35MMI Multi Misión Interceptor; 10.7 meters / 35 feet	Colombia; United States	Interceptor boat	35 MMI	2	FNH-3501; FNH-3502
EDUARDOÑO Patrullero 320; 10.0 meters / 32 feet	Colombia	Interceptor boat		25	FNH-3201 to FNH-3225
NAPCO Piraña Patrol Boats; 4.0 meters / 13 feet	United States	Riverine ops boat	Piraña class	8	
LANTANA BOATYARD Landing Craft Unit; 45.5 meters / 149 feet	United States	Coastal transport		1	FNH-1491 Punta Caxinas
COTECMAR BAL-C Short Range Logistic Support Ship; 49.0 meters / 161 feet	Colombia	Short Range Logistic Support Ship	BAL-C	1	FNH-1611 Gracias a Dios
SWIFTSHIPS LCM-8 Landing Craft Unit; 22.9 meters / 75 feet	United States	Landing craft		3	FNH-7301 Warunta; FNH-7302 Rio Coco; FNH-7303 unknown name

The Honduran navy has 4 naval bases:

- Base Naval Puerto Cortés – main repair and logistics base on the Caribbean Sea
- Base Naval Puerto Castilla – main operating base of patrol boats on the Caribbean Sea
- Base Naval Amapala – main operating base of coastal patrol craft on the north end of the island and only base on the Pacific Ocean side of Honduras
- Base Naval Caratasca – new base to deal with drug trafficking

Additionally, the Honduran navy has the following unit and schools:

- 1st. Marine Infantry Battalion – only marine unit located at La Ceiba
- Honduras Naval Academy – Trains officers for the Honduras Navy at La Ceiba
- Naval Training Center – NCO and Sailor training facility

== Military-civilian relations and leadership ==
According to a statement in July 2009 by a legal counsel of the Honduras military, Colonel Herberth Bayardo Inestroza, part of the elite Honduran Military generals were opposed to President Manuel Zelaya, whom the Military had removed from Honduras via a military Coup d'état, because of his left-wing politics. Inestroza stated, "It would be difficult for us [the military], with our training, to have a relationship with a leftist government. That's impossible."

The current Head of the Armed Forces is Carlos Antonio Cuéllar, graduate of the General Francisco Morazan Military Academy and the School of the Americas. In January 2011, the General Rene Arnoldo Osorio Canales, former Head of the Presidential Honor Guard, was appointed Commander.

In 2012, the Honduran Military has the highest military expenditures of all Central America. They had 52,225 troops in their Army, 16,500 troops in their Air Force, and 5,300 troops in their Navy.

As of 2026, the Honduran Military has 14,950 active troops with another 60,000 troops in reserve.

== Equipment ==
=== Small arms ===
Name	Image	Caliber	Type	Origin	Notes
Pistols
Browning Hi-Power		9×19mm	Semi-automatic pistol	Belgium	
Beretta 93R		9×19mm	Machine pistol	Italy	
Submachine guns
Uzi		9×19mm	Submachine gun	Israel	Uzi and Mini-Uzi
MAC-10		9×19mm	Submachine gun	United States	
Heckler & Koch MP5		9×19mm	Submachine gun	Germany	
Rifles
IWI Galil ACE		5.56×45mm	Assault rifle	Israel	
IWI Tavor X95		5.56×45mm	Bullpup; Assault rifle	Israel	
M16A1		5.56×45mm	Assault rifle	United States	
FN FAL		7.62×51mm	Battle rifle	Belgium	
M14		7.62×51mm	Semi-automatic rifle	United States	
Ruger Mini-14		.223 Remington	Battle rifle	United States	
Machine guns
Browning M2		.50 BMG	Heavy machine gun	United States	
M60		7.62×51mm	General-purpose machine gun	United States	
FN MAG		7.62×51mm	General-purpose machine gun	Belgium	
Rocket propelled grenade launchers
RPG-7		40mm	Rocket-propelled grenade	Soviet Union	
Grenade launchers
M203		40×46mm SR	Grenade launcher	United States	
M79		40×46mm	Grenade launcher	United States	

=== Anti-tank weapons ===
Name	Image	Type	Origin	Caliber	Notes
M18		Recoilless rifle	United States	57mm	
M40A1		Recoilless rifle	United States	105mm	50 in service
Carl Gustav		Recoilless rifle	Sweden	84mm	120 in service

=== Tanks ===
Name	Image	Type	Origin	Quantity	Notes
FV101 Scorpion		Light tank	United Kingdom	8	
FV107 Scimitar		Light tank	United Kingdom	1	

=== Reconnaissance ===
Name	Image	Type	Origin	Quantity	Notes
RBY Mk 1		Reconnaissance vehicle	Israel	6	
Alvis Saladin		Armored car	United Kingdom	22	Purchased from Germany in 1984

=== Armored personnel carriers ===
Name	Image	Type	Origin	Quantity	Notes
FV105 Sultan		Armored personnel carrier	United Kingdom	1	Purchased from United Kingdom in 1981

=== Utility vehicles ===
Name	Image	Type	Origin	Quantity	Notes
Humvee		LUV	United States	25	
M151		Utility vehicle	United States	Unknown	
Jeep J8		Utility vehicle	United States	10	
Nissan Frontier		Utility vehicle	Japan	1,200	
Toyota Hilux		Utility vehicle	Japan	47	
Trucks
M715		Utility truck	United States	Unknown	
M35		Utility truck	United States	Unknown	
M54		Utility truck	United States	Unknown	
Ford F-150		Utility truck	United States	44	
Ford F-350		Utility truck	United States	44	
Ashok Leyland Stallion		Utility truck	India	110	
Ashok Leyland Topchi		Utility truck	India	28	
Isuzi Q-Series		Utility truck	Japan	18	

=== Artillery ===
Name	Image	Type	Origin	Quantity	Notes
Mortars
M1		Mortar	United States	217	
M29		Mortar	United States	203	
Soltam M-65		Mortar	Israel	30	
Soltam M-66		Mortar	Israel	30	
Field artillery
M198		Howitzer	United States	4	
M102		Howitzer	United States	24	
M101		Howitzer	United States	20	

=== Air defence systems ===
Name	Image	Type	Origin	Quantity	Notes
Zastava M55 A2		Anti-aircraft gun	Yugoslavia	24	
M167 VADS		Rotary cannon	United States	30	

=== Historical equipment ===
==== Rifles ====
- Mosin-Nagant
- Mauser Model 1871
- Mauser Model 1895
- Mauser Standardmodell
- Remington Model 34
- M1885 Remington–Lee 500 units
- M1903 Springfield 2,083 units
- M1 Carbine 5,581 units
- M1 Garand

==== Submachine gun ====
- M1A1 Thompson

==== Machine guns ====
- M1895 Colt-Browning
- M1918 BAR
- M1937/39 Madsen

==== Anti tank weapons ====
- M67 recoilless rifle

==== Field artillery ====
- M116

==== Anti-aircraft artillery ====
- QF 1-pounder pom-pom

== See also ==
- Honduran presidential plane
