= 1982 Salvadoran presidential election =

- 29 April 1982
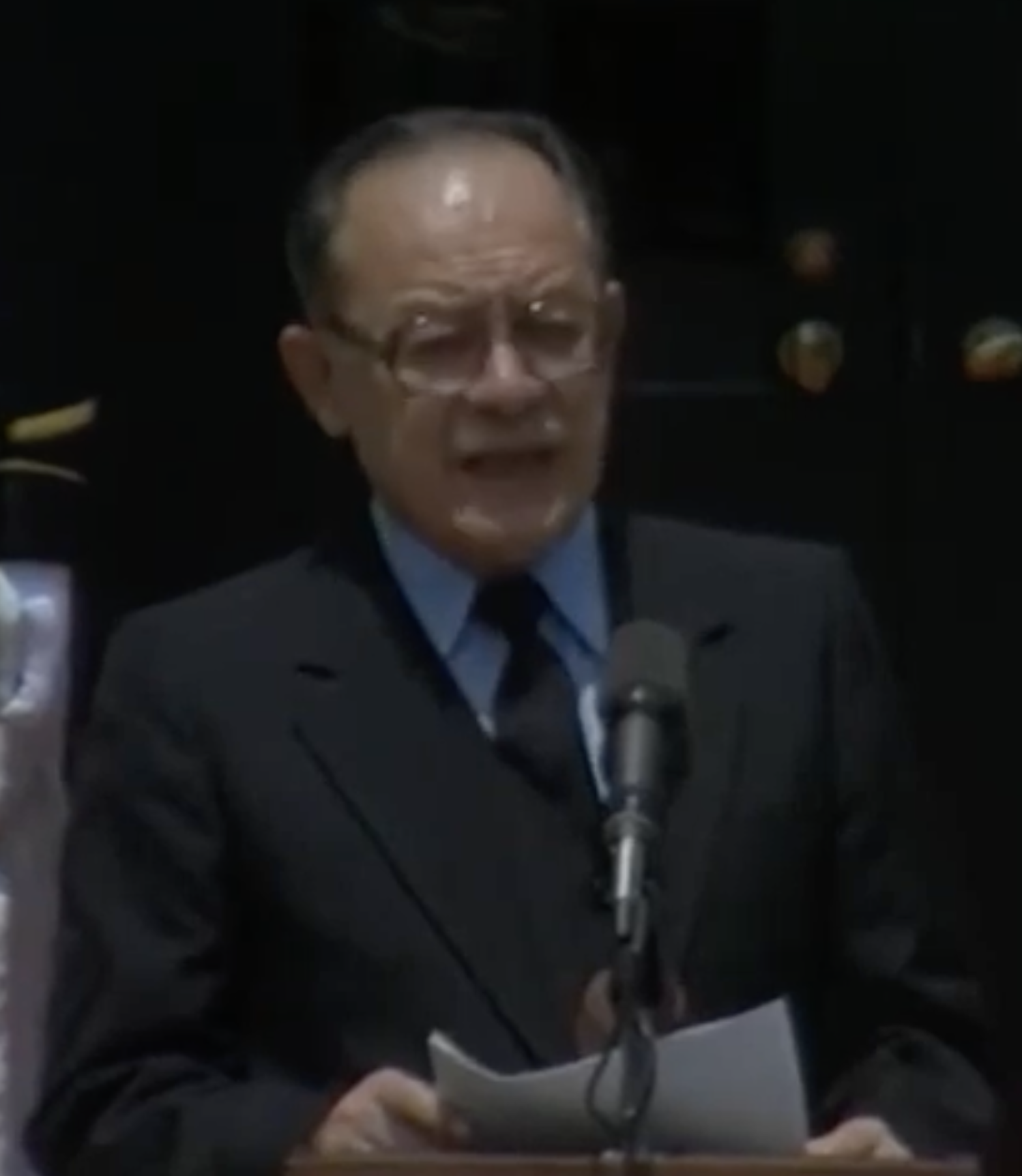
		ARENA
Candidate	Álvaro Magaña	Hugo César Barrera
Party	Democratic Action	ARENA
Legislative vote	36	17
Percentage	67.92%	32.08%
President before election
José Napoleón Duarte (Note: Before the 1982 election, José Napoleón Duarte was President of the Revolutionary Government Junta and was stylized as "President of the Republic".)
PDC
Elected President
Álvaro Magaña
Democratic Action

Presidential elections were held in El Salvador on 29 April 1982. The election was indirect rather than being a popular vote; the Constitutional Assembly voted on three candidates nominated by the Armed Forces of El Salvador (FAES). Álvaro Magaña, a moderate and the leader of the Democratic Action Party (AD), won the election with 36 votes.

In September 1981, the ruling Revolutionary Government Junta (JRG) scheduled a Constitutional Assembly election for March 1982. In April 1982, the new members of the Constitutional Assembly held a public session to elect the country's provisional president from three candidates approved by the armed forces. Magaña won 36 votes, defeating Hugo César Barrera of the Nationalist Republican Alliance (ARENA) who won 17 votes. Magaña became President on 2 May 1982 and served until 1 June 1984. His role was mostly symbolic and held little power; most power was vested with the military and Roberto D'Aubuisson, the president of the Constitutional Assembly.

D'Aubuisson, the leader of ARENA, was initially expected to win the election. The United States pressured the military and the Constitutional Assembly not to select D'Aubuisson as a presidential candidate due to his connections to death squads in the country's civil war. After the election, D'Aubuisson accused General Jaime Abdul Gutiérrez, a member of the JRG, of rigging the election in Magaña's favor.

== Political background ==
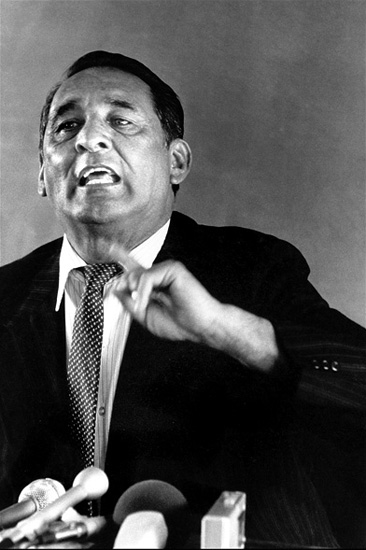
José Napoleón Duarte, president of the Revolutionary Government Junta at the time of the 1982 presidential election

Salvadoran president General Carlos Humberto Romero of the National Conciliation Party (PCN) was overthrown in a coup d'état by junior military officers on 15 October 1979 beginning the Salvadoran Civil War. The coup's leaders, Colonels Adolfo Arnoldo Majano and Jaime Abdul Gutiérrez, declared the establishment of the Revolutionary Government Junta (JRG) consisting of two military officers (themselves) and three civilians (Mario Antonio Andino, Román Mayorga Quirós, and Guillermo Ungo). Majano served as the JRG's chairman until 14 May 1980 when the armed forces replaced him with Gutiérrez.

On 13 December 1980, the JRG was restructured and consisted of four members with José Napoleón Duarte as its President; the other three members were José Ramón Ávalos Navarrete, Gutiérrez, and José Antonio Morales Ehrlich. Ávalos, Duarte, and Morales were members of the Christian Democratic Party (PDC). On 15 September 1981, under Duarte's lead, the JRG scheduled an election for the Constitutional Assembly to occur in March 1982. The Constitutional Assembly was responsible for drafting a new constitution and establish the process to hold a presidential election.

The composition of the Constitutional Assembly at the time of the 1982 presidential election

The election was scheduled to be held on 28 March 1982, but on the day the election was held, the rebel Farabundo Martí National Liberation Front (FMLN) launched a military offensive against the JRG and the armed forces to prevent the election from occurring. The offensive failed and Salvadorans cast their votes to elect all 60 seats on the Constitutional Assembly. The election was free and fair. The election resulted in the PDC winning 24 seats, the Nationalist Republican Alliance (ARENA) winning 19 seats, the PCN winning 14 seats, the Democratic Action Party (AD) winning 2 seats, and the Salvadoran Popular Party (PPS) winning 1 seat. The centrist PDC, which had been El Salvador's ruling party up to the election, lost its governing majority to the conservative PCN and ARENA.

== Prelude ==
After the March 1982 election, the Constitutional Assembly was scheduled to elect a provisional president to govern El Salvador until the new constitution was formally adopted. The presidential candidates would be selected by the armed forces. Roberto D'Aubuisson, the leader of ARENA, was a favorite to become President as he was elected as the president of the Constitutional Assembly on 22 April and many election observers believed he would win. D'Aubuisson was a former military officer with connections to far-right death squads and was implicated in the assassination of Archbishop Óscar Romero in March 1980.

The United States pressured Minister of National Defense General José Guillermo García, the armed forces, and the Constitutional Assembly to not elect D'Aubuisson as President as it could have potentially damaged El Salvador's international image and potentially prevent the United States from sending the Salvadoran government further military aid in the civil war. Ultimately, D'Aubuisson was not selected as ARENA's presidential candidate by the armed forces who instead chose Hugo César Barrera, a D'Aubuisson loyalist. The other candidates were Álvaro Magaña (a moderate, friend of the military, and the leader of AD) and a politician of the PCN.

== Results ==
The presidential election was held on 29 April 1982 and occurred in a public session of the Constitutional Assembly. The Constitutional Assembly elected Magaña as the provisional president with 36 votes. Barrera came in second with 17 votes. There were 7 abstentions. Pablo Mauricio Alvergue of the PDC, Mauricio Gutiérrez Castro of ARENA, and Raúl Molina Martínez of the PCN were elected as Magaña's co-vice presidents. The results were published by Diario Oficial, the official government newspaper, later that day in Decrees No. 4 and 6.

1982 Salvadoran presidential election
Candidate	Party	Votes	%
Álvaro Magaña	Democratic Action Party	36	67.92
Hugo César Barrera	Nationalist Republican Alliance	17	32.08
Unknown candidate	National Conciliation Party	0	0.00
Total		53	100.00
Blank votes		7	11.67
Registered voters/turnout		60	100.00
Source: Schooley 1987, p. 63 & Decamilli Achinelli 1983, p. 184

== Aftermath ==
D'Aubuisson criticized the result of the election, accusing Gutiérrez of imposing "his personal decision to put Álvaro Magaña in the presidency" upon the Constitutional Assembly despite a "categorical no" from ARENA. ARENA had previously accused Magaña of being a "Communist" and a "little Jew". Magaña became President of El Salvador on 2 May 1982. Magaña was El Salvador's first civilian president in over fifty years. Magaña appointed a cabinet that consisted of ARENA, PCN, and PDC members. During Magaña's presidency, he rejected negotiating with the FMLN to share power in El Salvador. Although Magaña was the country's president, the office was largely symbolic and most power was vested in D'Aubuisson as President of the Constitutional Assembly and in the military. The Constitutional Assembly adopted a new constitution on 20 December 1983. Duarte won the 1984 presidential election after defeating D'Aubuisson in the second round. Duarte was inaugurated on 1 June 1984.

== See also ==
- Elections in El Salvador
