= Jaime Abdul Gutiérrez =

Chairman of the Revolutionary Government Junta of El Salvador (1980)

General Jaime Abdul Gutiérrez
- Gutiérrez in 1979 as a colonel

Chairman of the Revolutionary Government Junta of El Salvador
- In office 12 May 1980 – 13 December 1980
- Preceded by: Adolfo Arnoldo Majano
- Succeeded by: José Napoleón Duarte as president of the Revolutionary Government Junta

Vice President of the Revolutionary Government Junta of El Salvador
- In office 13 December 1980 – 2 May 1982
- President: José Napoleón Duarte
- Preceded by: Julio Ernesto Astacio as vice president of El Salvador
- Succeeded by: Raúl Molina Martínez; Mauricio Gutiérrez Castro; Pablo Mauricio Alvergue as co-vice presidents of El Salvador

Member of the Revolutionary Government Junta of El Salvador
- In office 15 October 1979 – 2 May 1982

Commander-in-Chief of the Armed Forces of El Salvador
- In office 12 May 1980 – 18 May 1982
- Preceded by: Adolfo Arnoldo Majano
- Succeeded by: Álvaro Magaña

Personal details
- Born: Jaime Abdul Gutiérrez Avendaño; 5 April 1936 Sonsonate, El Salvador
- Died: 9 August 2012 (aged 76) La Libertad, El Salvador
- Resting place: Antiguo Cuscatlán, El Salvador; 13°40′03″N 89°15′56″W
- Education: Captain General Gerardo Barrios Military School
- Occupation: Military officer, engineer

Military service
- Allegiance: El Salvador
- Branch/service: Salvadoran Army
- Years of service: 1954–1982
- Rank: General
- Commands: Armed Forces of El Salvador
- Battles/wars: Football War; Salvadoran Civil War; 1979 coup d'état; Final offensive of 1981

Jaime Abdul Gutiérrez Avendaño (5 April 1936 – 9 August 2012) was a Salvadoran military officer, statesman, and engineer. He served as the chairman of the Revolutionary Government Junta (JRG) in 1980 and as the vice president of the JRG from 1980 to 1982. He also served as the commander-in-chief of the Armed Forces of El Salvador (FAES) from 1980 to 1982.

Gutiérrez enrolled in the Captain General Gerardo Barrios Military School in 1954 and became an officer in the Salvadoran Army three years later. He took part in the Football War against Honduras in July 1969. Gutiérrez was one of the leaders of the 1979 Salvadoran coup d'état which overthrew President General Carlos Humberto Romero and ended 48 years of military dictatorship in El Salvador.

Gutiérrez became a member of the JRG which was established in the aftermath of the coup. He struggled for power and influence within the JRG with Colonel Adolfo Arnoldo Majano—the JRG's chairman and commander-in-chief of the armed forces—throughout 1979 and 1980. This power struggle ended with Gutiérrez succeeding Majano as chairman and commander-in-chief in May 1980 and Majano's ultimate removal from the JRG in December 1980. Gutiérrez was the only member of the JRG to serve throughout its entire existence from 1979 to 1982. His membership of the JRG spanned the early years of the Salvadoran Civil War.

== Early life ==
Jaime Abdul Gutiérrez Avendaño was born in Sonsonate, El Salvador on 5 April 1936. His father worked for the Public Property Registry while his mother was a professor. Gutiérrez was orphaned at the age of 4, after which, he was raised by his grandparents.

== Military career ==
Gutiérrez enrolled at the Captain General Gerardo Barrios Military School in 1954; he graduated in 1957. After graduating, he entered the Salvadoran Army and was given the command of a section of the Fifth Infantry Regiment which was stationed in Santa Ana. In 1962, Gutiérrez enrolled at the Military School of Engineers of Mexico where he graduated in 1968 with a degree in industrial engineering. In July 1969, Gutiérrez returned to El Salvador and took part in Football War with neighboring Honduras. After the war, Gutiérrez continued his engineering studies in South Korea. He began working for the National Communications Administration (ANTEL) as its planning director in 1973.

In 1974, Gutiérrez served as the director of the national telephone company. In 1978, Gutiérrez was appointed as an executive of the army's maintenance department and logistics center; six months later in 1979, he was appointed as its the commander of the maintenance department.

== Revolutionary Government of the Junta ==
=== 1979 coup d'état ===
Following the overthrow of Nicaraguan President Anastasio Somoza Debayle by the Sandinista National Liberation Front (FSLN) in July 1979, some Salvadoran military officers feared that left-wing groups in El Salvador would seek to emulate the FSLN's success. Gutiérrez joined a junior officers' military clique known as the Military Youth ("Juventud Militar") and plotted to overthrow Romero in order to prevent a leftist revolution. On 15 October 1979, the Military Youth staged a coup d'état against Romero's government, during which, Gutiérrez organized the capture of the San Carlos barracks in San Salvador, the country's capital city. The coup succeeded and Romero was forced to flee the country. The coup ended 48 years of military dictatorship in El Salvador.

The military officers who organized the coup promised to prevent "another Nicaragua" and sought to fix the country's economic problems. They established the Revolutionary Government Junta (JRG) as a joint civilian-military government to rule El Salvador. The JRG consisted of three civilians—Mario Antonio Andino, the vice president of the Chamber of Commerce and Industry of El Salvador, Román Mayorga Quirós, a member of the Central American University, and Guillermo Ungo, a democratic socialist politician—and two military officers—Gutiérrez and Colonel Adolfo Arnoldo Majano, the latter of whom served as the JRG's chairman.

=== Power struggle within the JRG ===
Although both Gutiérrez and Majano both represented the military, they represented and were supported by different sectors within the military; Gutiérrez was supported by conservatives and the oligarchy while Majano was supported by moderates and reformists. Both men supported implementing social, economic, and land reforms in order to rally support from the country's peasants away from left-wing groups promising the same reforms. Despite this, Gutiérrez and defense minister José Guillermo García sought to undermine Majano's influence in the JRG by denying his supporters important government positions and rank promotions; Gutiérrez and García believed that Majano was giving too many concessions to leftists.

On 2 May 1980, Majano unilaterally ordered the arrest of Major Roberto D'Aubuisson for attempting to stage a coup d'état against the JRG. Majano's arrest order caused controversy within the military. Many officers believed that Majano was causing internal division within the officer ranks for not consulting with other high ranking officers, especially Gutiérrez, prior to issuing the order. Majano's supporters argued that he outranked Gutiérrez, as Majano was a Las Armas ("the arms") officer while Gutiérrez was a Los Servicios ("the services") officer. (Note: In the Salvadoran Army, officers were categorized as either being a Las Armas ("the arms") officer or a Los Servicios ("the services") officer. A Las Armas officer was anyone who served in the infantry, cavalry, or other combat position. A Los Servicios officer was anyone who was an engineer, doctor, lawyer, or any other similar occupation. Under this system, a Las Armas officer outranked a Los Servicios officer of the same rank regardless of how long the latter had held their position.) As such, Majano's supported argued that he did not have to consult Gutiérrez before issuing the arrest order as Majano outranked Gutiérrez. D'Aubuisson was eventually released without charge.

On 12 May 1980, the country's military officers met in San Salvador in order to "put an end to the duality in the leadership of the military institute command" ("poner fin a la dualidad en la conducción del mando del instituto castrense") between Gutiérrez and Majano. The final vote tallied 310 votes for Gutiérrez to 201 votes for Majano; Gutiérrez subsequently succeeded Majano as both chairman of the JRG and commander-in-chief of the armed forces and Majano's influence within the JRG was curbed. Majano was ultimately removed from the JRG on 13 December amidst allegations that he had joined the leftist rebels.

After Majano was removed from the JRG, the junta reorganized itself. José Napoleón Duarte, a member of the Christian Democratic Party (PDC), was appointed as the JRG's president while Gutiérrez was appointed as its vice president; Gutiérrez retained his position as commander-in-chief of the armed forces. Gutiérrez was the only member of the JRG who would interact with the armed forces, however, he was not granted executive authority over the armed forces. Gutiérrez was unable to assign military officers to positions, instead, he had to cooperate with the ministry of defense.

When Gutiérrez assumed the role of commander-in-chief of the armed forces, he held the rank of colonel but he was ineligible to be promoted to the rank of general due to him not meeting the service time requirement at the time. In November 1981, Duarte passed a law which changed the requirements for rank promotion within the armed forces. Gutiérrez was subsequently promoted to the rank of general on 31 December 1981 as a result of the law change.

=== Civil war ===
Although the 1979 coup was organized in order to prevent a left-wing revolution in El Salvador, it led to the outbreak of the Salvadoran Civil War between the Salvadoran government and left-wing rebel groups. On 10 October 1980, five left-wing rebel groups formed the Farabundo Martí National Liberation Front (FMLN), a guerrilla coalition unifying the country's left-wing groups against the JRG. In January 1981, the FMLN launched the final offensive of 1981, a military offensive against the JRG. Prior to the final offensive, several High Command General Staff members, including Gutiérrez, placed the military in a "state of alert" in anticipation of such a military offensive; a national curfew was implemented the day the offensive began. Although the final offensive ultimately ended in an FMLN failure, but it did establish the group as a competent guerrilla opposition to the JRG.

On 15 October 1981, the second anniversary of the 1979 coup, the FMLN attacked and bombed the Bridge of Gold, one of only two bridges crossing the Lempa River. The Salvadoran government considered the Bridge of Gold to be the most important bridge in the country due to the amount of commercial traffic crossing over it every day. At a rally celebrating the coup's anniversary, Gutiérrez denounced the bombing as a "criminal act [...] directed at the Salvadoran people" and claimed that it was conducted by "foreign saboteurs". Despite his denouncement, Gutiérrez announced the end of the curfew implemented in January 1981 in order to influence the political climate prior to legislative elections scheduled to be held in March 1982.

=== Transfer of power ===
In the 1982 legislative election, the PDC won a plurality of seats in the Legislative Assembly, but did not reach a majority. Instead, a right-wing coalition consisting of the National Conciliation Part (PCN), the party of the former military dictatorship since 1961, and Nationalist Republican Alliance (ARENA), the party founded by D'Aubuisson in 1981, won a majority. ARENA and the PCN elected D'Aubuisson as the president of the Legislative Assembly. D'Aubuisson was also likely to be elected as president of El Salvador, but after lobbying from the United States due to D'Aubuisson's affiliation with far-right death squads, the Legislative Assembly elected independent candidate Álvaro Magaña as the country's president.

Magaña assumed office as president of El Salvador on 2 May 1982 and the JRG was dissolved in a peaceful transfer of power when all its members, including Gutiérrez, resigned. Gutiérrez was the only person to serve as a member of the JRG throughout its entire existence.

== Retirement ==
Gutiérrez resigned as commander-in-chief of the army on 18 May 1982. He relinquished the position to Magaña as El Salvador's constitution mandated that the country's president would also be the commander-in-chief of the armed forces. Colonel Rafael Flores Lima, who announced Gutiérrez's resignation at a press conference, elaborated that it was "not possible" for both Magaña and Gutiérrez to be commander-in-chief. Gutiérrez briefly remained on active duty after his resignation before withdrawing from active service entirely sometime before April 1984.

He became the president of ANTEL and the chairman of the Executive Commission of the Hydroelectric Complex on the Lempa River (CEL) sometime before 1984. After the FMLN briefly captured and damaged the Cerrón Grande Dam in June 1984, Gutiérrez estimated that repairs would take around one month and that the government would have to spend up to US$80,000 per day to make up for lost energy production. In November 1984, Gutiérrez told The New York Times that he believed that both the far-right and far-left in El Salvador both sought to overthrow the JRG to prevent reforms but for different reasons: the right wanted to stop the reforms all together while the left wanted to overthrow the reforms to implement socialism.

== Death ==
Gutiérrez died on 9 August 2012 at the age of 76 at his home in La Libertad. He died following a prolonged illness. He was buried the following day at the Montelena Funerary Complex in Antiguo Cuscatlán.

== Legacy ==
Gutiérrez is a controversial figure in El Salvador. Some consider him to have been a dictator and conductor of state terror, while others consider him an honest military man who "did not sit down at the negotiating table with criminals" and provided stability to the country. His participation in the 1979 coup is also debated: one view is he helped end the bloody dictatorship of Romero, another accuses him of removing a regime that had ensured stability since 1962. In 1982, a senior United States diplomat described Gutiérrez as a "true patriot".

While giving testimony in 2021 regarding the events of the 1981 El Mozote massacre, General Juan Rafael Bustillo—the commander of the Salvadoran Air Force for most of the civil war—stated that he did not believe that Gutiérrez had any role in the massacre's occurrence. Bustillo added that while Gutiérrez and the military's high command may have known about potential "consequences" ("consecuencias") following military operations, they would have found out about atrocities through media coverage.

The General and Engineer Jaime Abdul Gutiérrez National Institution located in Sonsonate is named after Gutiérrez.

== Published works ==
Gutiérrez authored one book, Witness and Actor, which was posthumously published in 2013. The book, which was presented by members of Gutiérrez's family in August 2013, recounts his testimony about his tenure as a member of the JRG.

- Witness and Actor: A Review of the Background that has Led Us to the Current Situation of El Salvador (2013, Technological University of El Salvador; ISBN 9789996148040 OCLC 879869504)

== Notes ==
Political offices
Preceded by Adolfo Arnoldo Majano	Chairman of the Revolutionary Government Junta; 1980	Succeeded by José Napoleón Duarte
Preceded by Julio Ernesto Astacio	Vice President of the Revolutionary Government Junta; 1980–1982	Succeeded by Raúl Molina Martínez; Mauricio Gutiérrez Castro; Pablo Mauricio Alvergue
Military offices
Preceded by Adolfo Arnoldo Majano	Commander-in-Chief of the Armed Forces of El Salvador; 1980–1982	Succeeded by José Napoleón Duarte
