= 1979 Salvadoran coup d'état =

Overthrow of President Carlos Humberto Romero

- Part of the Salvadoran Civil War and the Cold War
Date	15 October 1979
Location	El Salvador
Result	Coup successful: Carlos Humberto Romero overthrown; Revolutionary Government Junta established by coup leaders; Beginning of the Salvadoran Civil War

Belligerents
Military dictatorship	Armed Forces; Military Youth Movement

Commanders and leaders
Carlos Romero (surrendered)	Adolfo Arnoldo Majano; Jaime Abdul Gutiérrez; Carlos Vides Casanova

Casualties and losses
- None

The 1979 Salvadoran coup d'état occurred on 15 October when junior officers of the Armed Forces of El Salvador's Military Youth Movement (MJM) bloodlessly overthrew General Carlos Humberto Romero, the president of El Salvador. The coup leaders established the Revolutionary Government Junta (JRG) that ruled El Salvador until 1982.

Since 1931, a military dictatorship had ruled El Salvador; from 1961, it was led by the National Conciliation Party (PCN). During the 1970s, leftist militant groups committed terrorist actions such as kidnappings and hit-and-run attacks, and mass organizations held peaceful demonstrations to oppose the military dictatorship. The dictatorship and death squads targeted and repressed members of these groups. The PCN remained in power after claiming to have won fraudulent presidential elections during the 1970s.

Political violence increased during Romero's presidency from 1977 to 1979, and some junior military officers believed that Romero had to be overthrown to prevent the country from falling to a leftist revolution. On 15 October 1979, the Military Youth Movement took control of El Salvador's military garrisons, and Romero surrendered when the coup leaders agreed to let him and loyalist government officials leave the country. The JRG appointed new government and military officials and promised to implement reforms, but the coup started the Salvadoran Civil War (Note: Some sources state the 1979 coup d'état started the Salvadoran Civil War; others place the start date sometime in 1980 or at the start of the final offensive of 1981.) that lasted until 1992. The 1979 coup d'état is the most recent to occur in El Salvador.

== Background ==
Following a military coup in 1931, the Armed Forces of El Salvador (FAES) ruled El Salvador through a military dictatorship. From 1931 to 1948, the dictatorship was led by Brigadier General Maximiliano Hernández Martínez and, after his resignation and exile, by a succession of three military officers who had served in Martínez's semi-fascist government. After a coup by junior officers in 1948, El Salvador was ruled by the military-backed and reformist Revolutionary Party of Democratic Unification (PRUD) until a 1960 coup overthrew the president, Lieutenant Colonel José María Lemus. The social democratic Junta of Government was overthrown the following year by the conservative Civic-Military Directory.

The Civic-Military Directory, led by Colonel Julio Adalberto Rivera, established the military-backed National Conciliation Party (PCN). Rivera was elected president of El Salvador unopposed in the 1962 presidential election. The PCN claimed to have won the next three presidential elections in 1967, 1972, and 1977, the latter two of which were described by political scientist Michael Krennerich as having been subject to "massive electoral fraud". Opposition groups such as the Christian Democratic Party (PDC) and the National Opposition Union (UNO) participated in the elections, but the government prevented them from winning. A faction of reformist junior officers attempted to overthrow the PCN government after the 1972 presidential election and install opposition leader José Napoleón Duarte as president, but the coup attempt failed and Duarte was exiled.

== Prelude ==
=== Militant and death squad activities ===
Throughout the 1970s, several leftist militant groups operated in El Salvador. Groups such as the Farabundo Martí Popular Liberation Forces (FPL) and the People's Revolutionary Army (ERP) engaged in hit-and-run attacks against government buildings, committed kidnappings for ransom, and other instances of terrorism. There were also mass organizations supported by peasants, workers, and some members of the Catholic Church that organized public demonstrations, strikes, and civil disobedience to create conditions that would start a revolution. The mass organizations had tens of thousands of members.

As well as leftist militant groups and mass organizations, far-right, government-aligned death squads operated in El Salvador that targeted members of these groups. Death squads such as the Wars of Elimination Anti-Communist Liberation Armed Forces (FALANGE) and the White Warrior's Union (UGB) assassinated and disappeared leftist leaders and members of the clergy. Many death squads had direct connections to FAES officers. The government itself also repressed mass organizations, and in July 1975, government forces killed at least 37 University of El Salvador students in a massacre.

=== Presidency of Carlos Humberto Romero ===
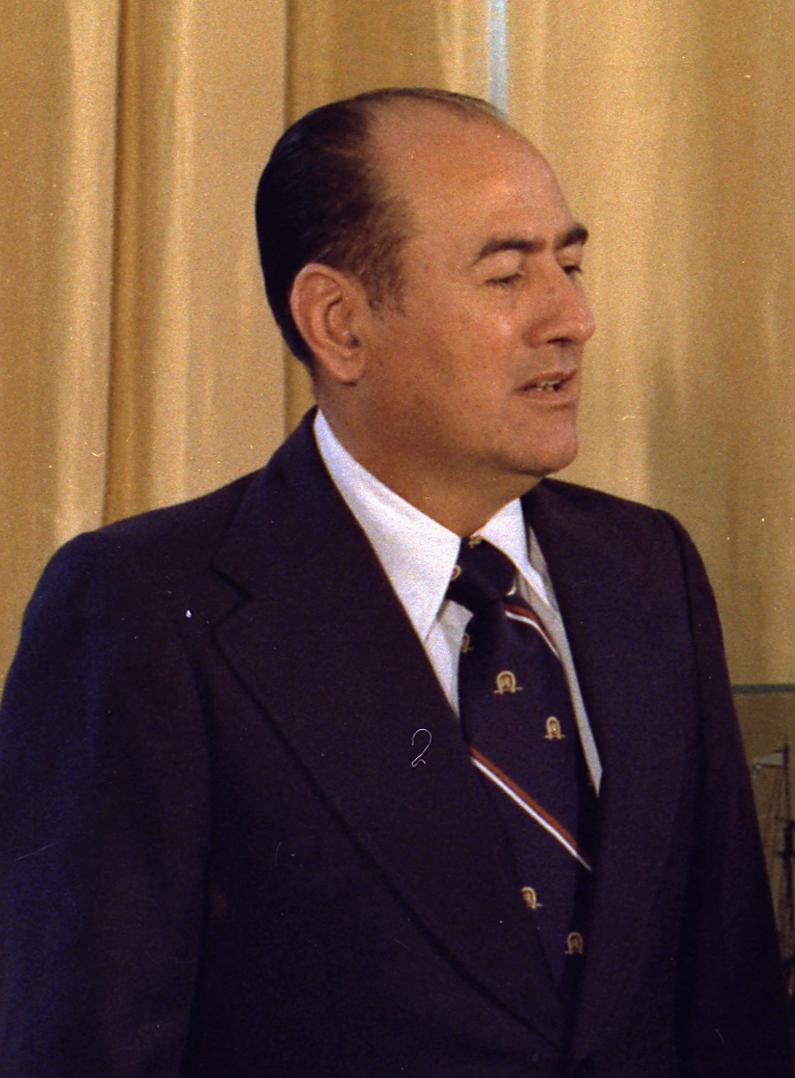
General Carlos Humberto Romero, President of El Salvador at the time of the 1979 coup

General Carlos Humberto Romero, the Minister of Defense and Public Security from 1972 to 1977, claimed to have won the fraudulent 1977 presidential election with 67.3 percent of the vote against UNO's Colonel Ernesto Claramount. Claramount led a protest against the result at the Liberty Plaza in San Salvador, but government forces attacked the protest and killed between 50 and 200 people. Romero became president on 1 July 1977 and was scheduled to serve until 1 July 1982.

Political violence increased during Romero's presidency. Militant groups carried out more assassinations, kidnappings, and bombings against the government in an attempt to spark a revolution, and mass organizations organized more strikes and protests. The FPL assassinated former president Colonel Osmín Aguirre y Salinas 12 days into Romero's presidency. Membership in militant groups and mass organizations increased, and new groups such as the 28 February Popular Leagues (LP-28) were established.

Death squads persecuted members of the clergy as many supported social reform, helped peasants establish associations that evolved into mass organizations, and some espoused liberation theology. In June 1977, the UGB declared that all Jesuits had to leave El Salvador within 30 days or face "immediate and systematic execution". In November, Romero legalized the repression of opposition groups, which Amnesty International described as being "specifically designed to restrict the actions of trade unions, the political opposition, and human rights monitors, including members of the clergy". In March 1979, government helicopters killed seven striking brewery workers, and in May, the National Police killed 23 protesters in front of the Metropolitan Cathedral of San Salvador.

== Coup ==
=== Planning ===
Plots to overthrow Romero began to form around March 1979 as violence continued to increase. The July 1979 overthrow of Nicaraguan president Anastasio Somoza Debayle in the Nicaraguan Revolution further led many military officers to believe they needed to preemptively overthrow Romero. They were surprised at how quickly Somoza's government fell and wanted to prevent a leftist revolution from taking power in El Salvador as had happened in Nicaragua.

According to Michael McClintock, a staff member of the Amnesty International Research Division, "most of El Salvador knew a coup was brewing" by late September 1979. There were three factions forming plots to overthrow Romero. A faction of conservative junior officers—led by colonels Nicolás Carranza, José Guillermo García, Jaime Abdul Gutiérrez, and Carlos Eugenio Vides—supported implementing moderate reforms and favored strong relations with the United States. Colonels Adolfo Arnoldo Majano and René Guerra y Guerra led another faction of junior officers who supported implementing farther-reaching reforms. A third group of reactionaries were aligned with the country's oligarchy and wanted to prevent any reforms from occurring.

On 6 October 1979, members of the conservative and reform factions met and discussed the formation of a "Revolutionary Junta". The two factions, together known as the Military Youth Movement (MJM), voted to have Majano and Guerra y Guerra lead the junta, but the following day, Gutiérrez warned the MJM that Guerra y Guerra had leftist tendencies. The MJM held another vote, and it was split between Guerra y Guerra and García. They eventually selected Gutiérrez as a compromise.

=== Romero's overthrow ===
"In the view of the anarchic situation of the country, as a consequence of activities directed by extremist elements, which the present government has proved incapable to resolve [...] Permitting a recurrence to violence as a means to resolve the political problems of the country, precipitating a possible confrontation of the armed forces with their people"; [...] the Armed Forces of El Salvador, reacting to the general clamor and in an eminently institutional function, depose the present government of the Republic in order to restore constitutional order."

— Proclamation issued by the Revolutionary Government Junta, 15 October 1979

On 11 October, Romero visited the United States for "health reasons" and returned the following day. On 14 October, Romero evacuated his family from El Salvador to the U.S., and that night, the international press reported a coup was in progress. On 15 October, the MJM seized control of all the country's military garrisons. Throughout the day, Romero was at the Presidential Palace communicating with the leaders of the military garrisons. Neither the National Guard, National Police, nor Treasury Police organized a resistance to the coup, as had occurred in previous coup attempts, since their leaders also believed Romero had to be removed from power. The coup leaders—Gutiérrez and Majano—charged Romero with corruption, election fraud, and human rights violations.

Romero surrendered after Gutiérrez captured the El Zapote Barracks in San Salvador. He agreed to surrender as long as he and loyalist government officials were allowed safe passage out of El Salvador. Romero left El Salvador to Guatemala via helicopter at 4:30 p.m. Other government officials who left the country included General Federico Castillo Yanes, the Minister of National Defense and Public Security; Colonel Antonio Corleto, the Director of the National Guard; Colonel Antonio López, the Director of the National Police; and Colonel Óscar René Serrano, the Director of the Treasury Police; among others. The coup's leaders subsequently declared the establishment of the Revolutionary Government Junta (JRG). The coup was bloodless.

The JRG consisted of two military officers—Gutiérrez and Majano—and three civilians—Mario Antonio Andino (a businessman), Román Mayorga Quirós (rector of the Central American University), and Guillermo Ungo (a politician of the leftist Revolutionary National Movement). The civilians joined the junta hoping that they could help implement reforms. Vides became Minister of Defense and Public Security. The JRG removed several generals from their positions and replaced them with junior officers. It also implemented a curfew and a state of siege.

== United States interest in regime change ==
During the 1950s, the United States created a mutual defense agreement with El Salvador as part of a wider effort to curb communist influence in Latin America during the Cold War. The U.S. trained the FAES in counterinsurgency during the 1960s to counter communist groups, and sold firearms, ammunition, vehicles, and other military equipment to El Salvador's security services. Around May 1979, the U.S. government began to consider that Romero's removal from power was necessary to prevent the entire government from collapsing and falling to a communist revolution. Somoza's overthrow in Nicaragua strengthened this position, and the U.S. adopted a foreign policy of containment in Central America. The United States did not want a similar revolution to occur in El Salvador, as it would weaken American influence in the region. Frank J. Devine, the U.S. ambassador to El Salvador, viewed the left's militancy and the Salvadoran military's weakness as factors which would allow such a revolution in El Salvador.

To the United States, Romero was a liability due to his poor human rights record, and it wanted to influence whom the Salvadoran military would choose as Romero's replacement. In the months before the coup, Viron P. Vaky and William G. Bowdler, two officials of the United States Department of State, visited El Salvador on two occasions and urged Romero to resign. (Note: In a 2 November 1979 edition of Latin American Weekly, Australian journalist Frank Devine insisted that Vaky and Bowdler did not ask Romero to resign and that the rumors were incorrect.) On 11 September 1979, Vaky gave a speech to the United States House of Representatives calling for change in Central America and warned that El Salvador was the country in the region most likely to collapse. Before the coup, its leaders informed the U.S. embassy in San Salvador that they were ready to overthrow Romero. After the coup, the U.S. supported the JRG's more conservative members and appointments, including Gutiérrez and Vides. The Salvadoran left accused the Central Intelligence Agency (CIA) of having orchestrated the coup.

== Aftermath ==
Colonels Jaime Abdul Gutiérrez (front left) and Adolfo Arnoldo Majano (front right) issuing the "Proclamation of the Armed Forces" on the day of the coup.

On the day of the coup, the JRG called for human rights to be respected, the release of political prisoners, agrarian reform, and economic and social change. It also promised to "establish the bases and environments appropriate for the establishment of a real and dynamic democracy" that would allow for "free elections in which the will of all Salvadorans will be reflected". It warned left- and right-wing extremists to "cease their violent attitude" because they would be able to "participate peacefully in the democratic process of the country". That same day, members of the ERP and LP-28 called for disorder in the streets and occupied the cities of Ciudad Delgado, Cuscatancingo, and Mejicanos. LP-28 described the coup as a "fascist self-coup". Óscar Romero, the archbishop of San Salvador, called on the country to maintain cohesion. TASS, the official news agency of the Soviet Union, welcomed the coup and criticized Carlos Humberto Romero for imposing "a bloody terror" ("un sangriento terror") in El Salvador.

In a document titled "Proclamation of the Armed Forces" ("Spanish: Proclama de la Fuerza Armada"), Majano and Gutiérrez justified the coup on the basis that the armed forces had a "right to insurrection". They asserted the coup was necessary as Romero's government violated the human rights of "the conglomerate" (the people), allowed and tolerated corruption, created a "true social and economic disaster", and brought El Salvador and the armed forces into "profound disrepute". The JRG appointed a cabinet consisting of military officers, Christian democrats, social democrats, and even some members from the Nationalist Democratic Union (UDN), a front of the Communist Party of El Salvador (PCES).

Although the JRG promised to implement reforms, Gutiérrez and Vides wanted to establish stability before doing so, and Majano wanted to start implementing reforms as soon as possible. On 3 January 1980, almost all cabinet members and the junta's three civilians resigned due to disagreements on how to implement the reforms. A second junta and later a third junta were established in 1980. Throughout its existence, the JRG failed to implement many promised reforms. No arrests were made regarding human rights abuses committed during Romero's government, although it did abolish the paramilitary Nationalist Democratic Organization (ORDEN). The JRG attempted to implement agrarian reforms in 1980, but by 1983, the reforms were abandoned due to opposition from military officers affiliated with the far-right Nationalist Republican Alliance (ARENA). The JRG did hold a promised presidential election in 1982, although it was indirect. Álvaro Magaña of the Democratic Action Party (AD) won, and he became the country's provisional president on 2 May 1982. Magaña was El Salvador's first civilian president in over fifty years, with the sole exception of Rodolfo Cordón who was provisional president for a few months in 1962 during the transition to PCN rule.

== Legacy ==
The 1979 coup ended the military dictatorship that had ruled El Salvador since 1931. It also marked the beginning of the Salvadoran Civil War. Some leftist groups called for an insurrection against the JRG, as they believed the armed forces would not or could not break with the past legacy of military dictatorship. Leftist militants who were dissatisfied with the JRG's governance continued their anti-government attacks. In 1980, several leftist militias joined forces and established the Farabundo Martí National Liberation Front (FMLN) that was militarily backed by the Soviet Union, Cuba, and Nicaragua. The Salvadoran Civil War ended on 16 January 1992 with the signing of the Chapultepec Peace Accords. Between 58,328 and 92,823 people were killed during the civil war, most of whom were civilians.

According to political scientist Michael Krennerich, El Salvador has held free and fair elections since 1982. After the civil war, the FMLN was legalized as a political party. It and the right-wing Nationalist Republican Alliance (ARENA) dominated El Salvador as a two-party system for three decades. The PCN continued to exist after the coup and moderated its political positions to support social democracy during the civil war. It was renamed to the National Coalition Party in 2012 and remains active in Salvadoran politics as a minor party. Romero, El Salvador's last military president, eventually returned to El Salvador at some point after his overthrow. He settled in Colonia Escalón, a neighborhood in San Salvador, where he died in 2017, aged 92. The 1979 coup is the most recent coup d'état to occur in El Salvador.

== See also ==
- List of Salvadoran coup d'états
