= National Security Agency of El Salvador =

Salvadoran intelligence agency

- Agencia Nacional de Seguridad Salvadoreña

Agency overview
- Formed: 1962 or 1965
- Dissolved: 1979
- Jurisdiction: El Salvador
- Headquarters: San Salvador, El Salvador
- Director responsible: José Alberto Medrano (1965–1977); Roberto Eulaio Santivanez (1977–1979)
- Deputy Director responsible: Roberto D'Aubuisson (1977–1979)
- Child agency: National Democratic Organization

The National Security Agency of El Salvador (Agencia Nacional de Seguridad Salvadoreña, abbreviated as ANSESAL) was the national intelligence agency of El Salvador during the military regime and the civil war. The organization was known for using paramilitaries and death squads to carry out its activities.

== History ==
The National Security Agency of El Salvador was established by President Julio Adalberto Rivera in 1962 or 1965 and was originally named the National Intelligence Service (SNI). Its original purpose was to oversee the operations of the National Democratic Organization, a group of paramilitaries and death squads used to combat political and militant opposition to the government. The organization maintained detailed files of information of thousands of Salvadorans, with some of the files being created by the United States' CIA The organization was headed by General José Alberto Medrano and later Colonel Roberto Eulaio Santivanez. It was dissolved in 1979, after the Salvadoran coup d'état that same year, and succeeded by the National Intelligence Agency (ANI).

== See also ==
- ORDEN (National Democratic Organization)
