= Christian Federation of Salvadoran Peasants =

Salvadoran peasant union

The Christian Federation of Salvadoran Peasants (Federación Cristiana de Campesinos Salvadoreños, abbreviated as FECCAS) was a Salvadoran peasant union which had connections to the Christian Democratic Party.

== History ==
The Christian Federation of Salvadoran Peasants was created by the National Union of Christian Workers (UNOC) in 1964. The federation became an independent entity in 1969 which allowed it to become a militant organization. FECCAS had most of its support from the poor agrarian population of El Salvador who suffered under the policies being made by the National Conciliation Party (PCN). Many FECCAS organizers were Roman Catholic priests who were Jesuits. In 1974, FECCAS, along with the Union of Rural Workers (UTC), formed the Unified Popular Action Front (FAPU).

While FECCAS was an independent organization, a part of the National Union of Christian Workers, and a part of the Unified Popular Action Front, members constantly were targeted by the Nationalist Democratic Organization (ORDEN), a collection of death squads and paramilitaries created and operated by the military government. When FECCAS demanded higher rural waged in October 1977, ORDEN cracked down on the organization by occupying large areas in Chalatenango, the department with its heaviest support, and committed seven murders and three rapes.

The organization ceased to exist in 1980 with increased repression and attacks from the Revolutionary Government Junta of El Salvador with many former members joining one of the five guerrilla groups which would form the Farabundo Martí National Liberation Front and fight against the government during the Salvadoran Civil War.

== See also ==
- Christian Democratic Party
- National Opposition Union
- Unified Popular Action Front
- United Front for Revolutionary Action
