= Carlos Mauricio =

Salvadoran academic

- Occupation: professor of Agricultural Sciences
- Years active: ?–1983

Carlos Mauricio is a Salvadoran academic, human rights activist, and former refugee. He was a professor of Agricultural Sciences at the University of El Salvador until his extrajudicial kidnapping by Salvadoran death squads in June 1983, and was tortured during the Salvadoran Civil War by the military under the command of Carlos Eugenio Vides Casanova, the country's Minister of Defense. He later became a refugee in the United States, and was a plaintiff in Arce v. García.

== Biography ==
On his release, he fled to the U.S., where his first job was as a dishwasher. He learned English and earned a graduate Certificate in Molecular Genetics, a teaching credential and an M.A. in Adult Education. In 2002, supported by the Center for Justice and Accountability, he won a lawsuit against General Vides Casanova for Casanova's command responsibility in Mauricio's kidnapping and torture. Mauricio was awarded significant punitive and compensatory damages against Vides Casanova.

Vides Casanova is one of many Salvadoran human rights abusers with links to the notorious School of the Americas at Fort Benning, Georgia, and in 1985 was a guest speaker at the school. Ramagoza v. José Guillermo Garcia, a lawsuit by survivors of torture during the Salvadoran Civil War, including Carlos Mauricio and Neris González. Garcia and Vides lost, and a judgment of over $54 million (U.S.) was entered against them, and upheld on appeal. Ironically, the Department of Homeland Security later charged García in 2009 with participating or assisting in torture and extrajudicial killings during his tenure as Minister of Defense. In 2014 he was ordered to be deported from the United States. On 8 January 2016, American immigration officials deported General García back to El Salvador.

After the trial, Prof. Mauricio devoted his time to human rights advocacy. In March 2006, he was part of a School of the Americas Watch delegation to Bolivia, Uruguay and Argentina. The delegation, headed by Father Roy Bourgeois, successfully persuaded the Ministers of Defense of all three countries to commit to stop sending troops to the School of the Americas (a.k.a. Western Hemisphere Institute for Security Cooperation). Also in 2006, he visited Peru, Chile and Ecuador and met with Ministers of Defense and presidential candidates in an attempt to persuade them to stop sending troops to the School of the Americas and successfully persuaded the Chilean government to do so. In 2007, he visited Nicaragua, El Salvador and Guatemala on a similar mission, but these governments have yet to agree to stop sending troops.

For several consecutive years, Professor Mauricio drove across country with a group of torture survivors and anti-torture activists to the annual vigil at the School of the Americas speaking to peace and anti-torture organizations along the way. He ran annual course in Salvadoran Human Rights and History at the University of San Salvador and worked without success to overthrow the post-Peace Accords amnesty and to establish a Museum of Historical Memory in the former headquarters of the National Police, where he was tortured.

== Recognition ==
In 2018, a feature film was produced in El Salvador about Carlos Mauricio's story "The Path of the Shadows".

In 2024, Prof. Mauricio published a memoir, or testimonio, in Spanish detailing his kidnapping and torture and the subsequent trial. “En vías de investigación: Testigo clave: una condena a la impunidad”. The book is currently available in El Salvador and on Amazon in the United States.

An English version of the book will be published in 2027 by Lived Places Publishing.
