= Raúl Molina =

Raúl Molina may refer to:

- Raúl Molina Martínez (born 1938), Salvadoran politician
- Raúl De Molina (born 1959), Cuban TV-show host
- Raúl Molina Alcocer (born 1976), Spanish footballer
- Raul Molina (musician), musician in the group C-Note
