= Carlos Eugenio Vides Casanova =

Salvadoran military officer (1937–2023)

Brigadier General Carlos Eugenio Vides Casanova
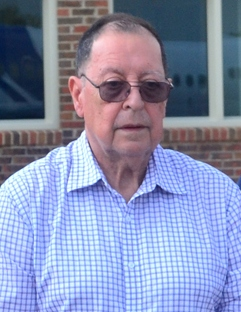
- Vides in 2015

Minister of National Defense of El Salvador
- In office April 1983 – May 1989
- President: Álvaro Magaña (until 1984); José Napoleón Duarte (from 1984)
- Preceded by: José Guillermo García
- Succeeded by: Rafael Humberto Larios López

Personal details
- Born: 29 November 1937 Santa Ana, El Salvador
- Died: 21 December 2023 (aged 86) San Salvador, El Salvador
- Spouse: Lourdes Llach
- Children: María Gema Vides Meléndez, Marta Del Carmen Vides Demmer, Geraldo Vides Meléndez
- Occupation: Military officer
- Known for: Human rights violations (torture)

Military service
- Allegiance: El Salvador
- Branch/service: Salvadoran Army
- Rank: Brigadier general
- Battles/wars: 1979 Salvadoran coup d'état Salvadoran Civil War

Carlos Eugenio Vides Casanova (29 November 1937 – 21 December 2023) was the head of the Salvadoran national guard between the years 1979 and 1983 and later served as the nation's Minister of Defense between 1983 and 1989.

In 1984, four national guardsmen who had once served under Vides Casanova's command – Daniel Canales Ramírez, Carlos Joaquín Contreras Palacios, Francisco Orlando Contreras Recinos and José Roberto Moreno Canjura – were convicted of murdering four American nuns and were sentenced to 30 years in prison. Their superior, sub-sergeant Luis Antonio Colindres Alemán, was also convicted of the murders.

In 1998, the four murderers confessed to abducting, raping and murdering the four nuns and claimed that they did so because Alemán had informed them that they had to act on orders from high-level military officers. Some were then released from prison after detailing how Vides and his cousin Col. Óscar Edgardo Casanova Vejar, the local military commander in Zacatecoluca, had planned and orchestrated the executions of the nuns. A 16-year legal battle to deport General Vides Casanova soon commenced.

== Emigration to the United States ==
Following his retirement, General Vides left El Salvador and moved to Florida in 1989 as a legal permanent resident and lived in Palm Coast.

After his first wife died, Vides married Lourdes Llach, daughter of coffee baron, amateur astronomer, and former Salvadoran ambassador to the Holy See (1977–1991) Prudencio Llach Schonenberg.

=== Lawsuit cases ===
Vides Casanova was sued in the federal civil court of Miami, Florida in the United States in two precedent-setting cases. The cases are referred to by the surname of his co-defendant, José Guillermo García:

- Ford v. Garcia, a lawsuit by the families of four Catholic nuns who were abducted, raped and murdered by a Salvadoran military death squad on 2 December 1980. The defense won the case, and the families appealed. Their appeal was denied, and in 2003, the United States Supreme Court refused to hear further proceedings.
- Ramagoza v. Garcia, a lawsuit by survivors of torture during the Salvadoran Civil War, including Carlos Mauricio and Neris González. Garcia and Vides lost, and a judgment of over $54 million (U.S.) was entered against them, and upheld on appeal. Ironically On 8 January 2016, American immigration officials deported General García back to El Salvador

=== Deportation to El Salvador ===
On 6 October 2009 the United States Department of Homeland Security announced that it had initiated deportation proceedings against General Vides Casanova for assisting in the torture of Salvadoran civilians. On 24 February 2012, a Federal immigration judge cleared the way for his deportation.

On 11 March 2015, the Board of Immigration Appeals dismissed General Vides Casanova's appeal. On 8 April 2015, U.S. immigration officials deported General Vides Casanova to El Salvador. The lawsuit filed against Vides Casanova and General García was featured in the 2018 film "The Path of the Shadows".

== Death ==
Vides Casanova died in San Salvador on 21 December 2023, at the age of 86.

== See also ==
- Juan Romagoza Arce
- José Guillermo García
- Western Hemisphere Institute for Security Cooperation
- Salvadoran Civil War
