= Black Shadow =

Black Shadow may refer to:

- Sombra Negra, (Spanish for "Black Shadow") a vigilante group in El Salvador
- Vincent Black Shadow, a British motorcycle produced from 1948 to 1955
- Black Shadow (wrestler), the ring name of Mexican professional wrestler Alejandro Cruz
- Black Shadow (Transformers), a Decepticon mercenary
