= María Julia Castillo Rodas =

Salvadoran surgeon and politician (1935–2016)

165th President of the Legislative Assembly of El Salvador
- In office 20 December 1983 – 1 May 1985
- Preceded by: Roberto D'Aubuisson
- Succeeded by: Guillermo Antonio Guevara

Personal details
- Born: 4 July 1935
- Died: 14 August 2016 (aged 81) San Salvador, El Salvador
- Party: National Conciliation Party
- Education: University of El Salvador
- Occupation: Politician

María Julia Castillo Rodas (4 July 1935 – 14 August 2016) was a Salvadoran surgeon and politician, who served as the first female president of the Legislative Assembly of El Salvador between 1983 and 1985. She also served as vice president of the Constitutional Assembly of 1982 and vice minister of health.

== Early life ==
Castillo was born on 4 July 1935. She graduated in Medicine from the University of El Salvador and specialised in Neurosurgery, completing her residency in the Departments of Internal Medicine and Surgery at Rosales Hospital.

She was a resident in neurosurgery at the Salvadoran Social Security Institute.

== Career ==
She was a member of the Higher Council of Public Health, becoming its Director, and vice minister of health in the government of President Carlos Humberto Romero.

Castillo got elected member of the 1982 Constitutional Assembly in the 1982 election for the National Conciliation Party, and became its vice president, and after it was concluded in 1983, Castillo became the first woman to serve as president of the Legislative Assembly of El Salvador. She co-signed the new Constitution and left the office in 1985.

On 24 March 2010, the Legislative Assembly declared her an Honourable Daughter of El Salvador for "her distinguished and outstanding professional and political career, which undoubtedly brings honour to Salvadoran women".

Although she had retired from public life, she remained an adviser to the National Conciliation Party's legislative group until her death. She was nicknamed the "Salvadorans' Iron Lady".

== Death ==
Castillo died on 14 August 2016 at the age of 81 after a long illness in a private hospital in San Salvador.
