= February 2007 Salvadoran congressmen killings =

2007 Salvadoran congressmen killings
- February 2007 Salvadoran congressmen killings (Guatemala)
- Location: 14°29′0″N 90°32′0″W; El Jocotillo, Guatemala
- Date: 17 February 2007
- Target: Salvadoran congressmen
- Attack type: Murder, torture, arson
- Deaths: 4
- Victims: Eduardo D'Aubuisson; William Pichinte; José Ramón González; Gerardo Ramírez
- Perpetrator: Unknown

On 19 February 2007, three members of the ARENA party of El Salvador — Eduardo D'Aubuisson, William Pichinte and José Ramón González, as well as their driver, Gerardo Ramírez — were found murdered near Guatemala City, Guatemala. Four police detectives were arrested and charged with the murder; within three days of their arrest, the four were murdered in a maximum-security prison cell. Several prosecutors investigating the deaths have also been murdered.

== Background ==
The three men were members of the Nationalist Republican Alliance (ARENA), the right-wing then-ruling party of El Salvador. Eduardo D'Aubuisson was a son of Roberto D'Aubuisson, the founder of ARENA and the leader of numerous Salvadoran death squads during that country's 1979–1992 civil war.

Guatemala has had one of the highest murder rates in Latin America and has been frequented by drug traffickers traveling from Colombia, through Mexico and to the United States.

== The murders ==
The three men were on their way to Guatemala City to attend the Central American Parliament on 19 February 2007. Their Toyota Land Cruiser, part of a four-car motorcade heading to the capital, pulled out of the convoy and onto a remote road at El Jocotillo, about 20 miles southeast of Guatemala City.

The next day, the bodies of the three congressmen and their driver were found in their charred and burnt vehicle. There were indications they had been tortured before death.

== Subsequent events ==
Soon after the murders, four Guatemalan policemen were arrested. They had been tracked by a GPS system embedded in a police vehicle that was at the scene of the killings. They were formally charged in connection with the case on 22 February; all four suspects were then secretly moved to the maximum-security prison El Boqueron, 40 miles east of Guatemala City.

On 25 February, the four men were murdered inside their prison cell. The killings were followed by a prison riot; the warden and some guards were taken hostage. Initial reports suggested that the gunmen entered the prison disguised as visitors. The national police, however, stated that it was more likely that the gunmen came from inside the prison, since it would have been almost impossible for them to have gotten past the three security perimeters thrown around the building: the prison guards, the national police, and the army. Twenty men at the prison were arrested, including the warden and many guards.

The dramatic killings immediately spawned a number of conspiracy theories, which were dismissed by Erwin Sperisen, the chief of the Guatemalan National Police: "People don't want to believe that the reality is simpler, more ironic and more stupid. It wasn't a great conspiracy. It was a series of coincidental events. But the people don't want to believe. They want a soap opera, a spy drama, a James Bond movie." Among the plausible theories put forward by Sperisen were that the officers might have been tricked into thinking they were assassinating Colombian drug dealers masquerading as Salvadoran deputies; political enemies in El Salvador may have arranged for the deputies' murder; and the Salvadoran deputies may in fact have been linked to the drug trade.

Early in March 2007, a top police official, Javier Figueroa, abruptly resigned his position and fled Guatemala with his family, seeking asylum first in Costa Rica and then Venezuela. Figueroa, a former gynecologist, was involved in arresting the four officers and claimed to be in fear for his life. But the press openly speculated that he in fact was involved in ordering the killings. Figueroa and his family fled to Austria later in 2007 and were granted asylum. In May 2011, Austrian authorities arrested Figueroa and subsequently announced that he would be tried for murder in Austria. However, they rejected Guatemala's extradition request due to the assumption that Figueroa could not expect a fair trial in his home country.

On 26 March 2007, Erwin Sperisen, the chief of the National Police, and Carlos Vielmann, the Interior Minister, resigned as a consequence of the two sets of killings.

On 8 April 2008, Victor Rivera, a Venezuelan national, was shot and killed while driving in Guatemala City. Two days earlier he had been fired from his advisory position to the Ministry of the Interior, where he was investigating the deaths of the Salvadoran deputies. The murder of Rivera, in turn, was investigated by former Attorney General Álvaro Matus, who was himself accused of conducting a cover-up by prosecutors from the Comisión Internacional Contra la Impunidad en Guatemala. Matus surrendered to authorities on February 3, 2009, but the charges against him were immediately dropped by the Public Ministry and he was released.

In July 2008, 13 suspects accused in the killings of the four suspects were acquitted by a judge. On 14 July 2008, the state prosecutor who had accused the 13 men, Juan Carlos Martínez, was shot dead in Guatemala City.

== Motives ==
Suspects range from drug cartels who were linked to the three dead men to Guatemalan or Salvadoran security officials.

== See also ==
- List of unsolved murders (2000–present)
