= United Front for Revolutionary Action =

Salvadoran paramilitary

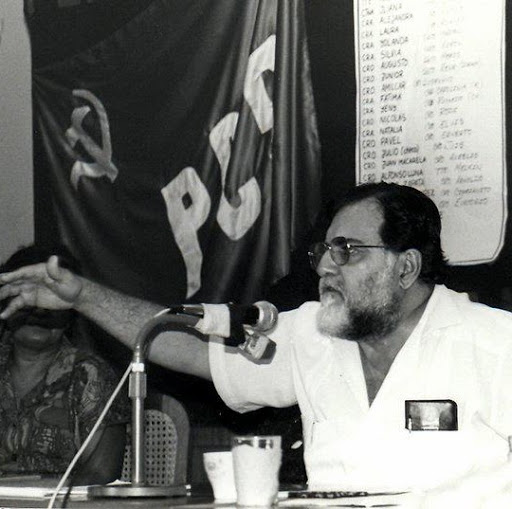
Schafik Hándal, leader of FUAR

The United Front for Revolutionary Action (Frente Unido de Acción Revolucionaria, abbreviated as FUAR) was a short-lived militant organization which was the paramilitary wing of the Communist Party of El Salvador from 1962 to 1964. The organization, which was led by Schafik Hándal, did not carry out any militant activities. A combination of targeting by the Nationalist Democratic Organization (ORDEN) on orders of President Julio Adalberto Rivera Carballo and Communist Party General-Secretary Cayetano Carpio's decision to abolish the group led to the group's disestablishment in 1964.

== See also ==
- Communist Party of El Salvador
- Unified Popular Action Front
- Christian Federation of Salvadoran Peasants
