= Rodolfo Antonio Castillo Claramount =

Salvadorian politician

Vice President of El Salvador
- In office 1 June 1984 – 1 June 1989
- President: José Napoleón Duarte
- Preceded by: Raúl Molina Martínez and Mauricio Gutiérrez Castro and Pablo Mauricio Alvergue
- Succeeded by: José Francisco Merino López

Personal details
- Born: 17 April 1936 (age 90) Sonsonate, El Salvador
- Party: Christian Democratic Party

Rodolfo Antonio Castillo Claramount (born 17 April 1936 in Sonsonate) is a former Vice President of El Salvador under José Napoleón Duarte from 1984 to 1989.

During Napoleón Duarte he also held the post of Minister of Foreign Affairs and Minister of Interior. He was elected as the secretary-general of the Christian Democratic Party. Castillo Claramount was interim president at the time of the health problems of Napoleón Duarte.
