= Héctor Dada Hirezi =

Salvadoran politician

Minister of the Economy of El Salvador
- In office 1 June 2009 – 27 April 2012
- President: Mauricio Funes
- Preceded by: Ricardo Esmahan
- Succeeded by: José Armando Flores Alemán

Member of the Revolutionary Government Junta
- In office 9 January 1980 – 3 March 1980

Personal details
- Born: Héctor Miguel Antonio Dada Hirezi; 12 April 1938 (age 88) San Salvador, El Salvador
- Party: Christian Democratic Party
- Occupation: Politician

Héctor Miguel Antonio Dada Hirezi (born 12 April 1938) is a Salvadoran former politician from the Christian Democratic Party who was a member of the Revolutionary Government Junta of El Salvador in 1980. He resigned from his position on 3 March 1980 after the assassination of Mario Zamora, another PDC politician.

Dada Hirezi was Minister of the Economy of El Salvador under President Mauricio Funes from 2009 to 2012.
