= Sombra Negra =

Death squad in El Salvador

Black Shadow
- Sombra Negra
- Dates active: 1989–1995, 2014–present
- Country: El Salvador
- Size: Unknown

The Sombra Negra (Spanish for "Black Shadow"), also known as El Clan de Planta ("The Plant Clan"), are (as of 2014) death squad groups based in El Salvador, allegedly composed mostly of police and military personnel, that target criminals and gang members for vigilante justice. The name first appeared around December 1989 in the Department of San Miguel. By April 1995, the group had stated that it had killed seventeen people, claiming that those killed were criminals or members of gangs. These vigilante groups are based in El Salvador. The government of El Salvador insists the groups are not under its control.

Sombra Negra members typically blindfolded and tied the hands and/or thumbs of their victims behind their backs. Several hours of torture would follow, often including the removal of the genitalia, hands, tongue, rectum and teeth. Finally, the victims were given tiros de gracia, or shots of grace, meaning they were shot in the base of their skulls with assault rifles and machine guns at close range. Messages were written on the victim's body such as "el idiota sufrió una muerte lenta" ("the idiot suffered a slow death") and other insults or gang-related slang. The Sombra Negra operatives would conceal their face and body with bandanas, anthropomorphic costumes, and use unlicensed vehicles with darkened windows when they carried out their missions in order to avoid full detection. Sombra Negra stated that it killed people because the group believed that the police could not enforce laws of El Salvador and that it is waging a campaign of “social cleansing” against gangs.

== Targeting MS-13 and 18th Street Gang ==
Sombra Negra is well known murdering people it claims are part of organizations referred to as Maras or "gangs"—even if they move and do their business in the United States, particularly Los Angeles. Similarly, Fernando Ramirez, a convicted felon serving 60 years in prison followed by five years of supervised release, asked in an interview for his tattoos to be removed before serving his sentence in San Salvador. Sombra Negra targets both MS-13 and its rival 18th Street Gang.

As of 2014, an increase in gang violence following the collapse of a gang truce has sparked a revival of activity for these death squads. The Salvadoran attorney general for human rights, David Morales, says this activity may be related to police activity. In an interview with Morales, the attorney general explained that the sombra negra has caused a rash of sexual assaults among gang members: "Gang members believe they [Sombra Negra] are infiltrating their ranks. Leadership and members [have] responded by raping suspected infiltrators."

Only 19 days into January 2019, El Salvador had already seen 200 murders across the country. Sombra Negra claimed that all the murders were caused by gang activity. They claim that the common people are tired of the constant murders and mourning and label the gangs as terrorists.

The death squad has expanded its area of operation to El Salvador’s neighboring countries of Honduras and Guatemala to rid the three countries of the Northern Triangle.

=== Notable killings ===
In 2014, the year Sombra Negra reemerged, members of the death squad dressed in all black clothing armed with M16 assault rifles raided a house of seven people, four of whom being members of MS-13. The four members were captured and tortured by Sombra Negra. All four were then killed with a single bullet to the back of the head. A few days following the attack, leaflets were posted in El Salvador demanding members of MS-13 to “leave within five days or face certain death.”

In March 2016, Sombra Negra members rounded up four MS-13 gang members and put them in the back of a pickup truck in the town of San Antonio Silva. They were taken to a soccer field, where they were shot in the back of the head and their bodies were left on the field.

On 25 January 2019, Sombra Negra murdered two members of MS-13. The first was in Paraíso de Osorio, La Paz, where police found the gang member's corpse in a creek with his hands tied behind his back, legs tied together, gagged, and a bullet in his head. Next to the body was a sign which read "La Sombra Negra ha llegado a Paraíso de Osorio. Ratas de la MS llegó su fin." (The Sombra Negra has arrived to Paraíso de Osorio. MS rats your time has come). The second was in San Jorge, San Miguel, with the body found in similar conditions.

== In popular culture ==
In the 2015 AMC American post-apocalyptic horror drama television series Fear the Walking Dead, the character of Daniel Salazar played by Panamanian actor & salsa musician Rubén Blades, is a former member of Sombra Negra who had been coerced into joining one of the Salvadoran Junta death squads and was personally responsible for killing nearly 100 Salvadorans.

== See also ==
- Death squads in El Salvador
- Los Pepes
- National Civil Police of El Salvador
- White arrow ().
