= Adolfo Arnoldo Majano =

Salvadoran military and political figure

Colonel Adolfo Arnoldo Majano

Chairman of the Revolutionary Government Junta
- In office 15 October 1979 – 12 May 1980
- Preceded by: Carlos Humberto Romero as president of El Salvador
- Succeeded by: Jaime Abdul Gutiérrez

Commander-in-Chief of the Armed Forces of El Salvador
- In office 15 October 1979 – 12 May 1980
- Preceded by: Carlos Humberto Romero
- Succeeded by: Jaime Abdul Gutiérrez

Personal details
- Born: 21 April 1938 (age 88) Intipucá, El Salvador
- Occupation: Military officer

Military service
- Allegiance: El Salvador
- Branch/service: Salvadoran Army
- Years of service: 1955–1980
- Rank: Colonel
- Commands: Salvadoran Army
- Battles/wars: Football War; 1979 Salvadoran coup d'état; Salvadoran Civil War

Adolfo Arnoldo Majano Ramos (born 21 April 1938) is a former Salvadoran military and political figure. He was one of the leaders of the military coup on October 15, 1979, and the chairman of the Revolutionary Government Junta of El Salvador from 1979 to 1980.

== Biography ==
Adolfo Arnoldo Majano Ramos was born on 21 April 1938 in the Intipucá, El Salvador. He entered the Salvadoran Escuela Militar Capitán General Gerardo Barrios in 1955 and graduated in 1958 with the rank of junior lieutenant of the infantry. In 1974, he graduated from the General Staff of the Higher Military School in Mexico City. He also studied at the School of the Americas in the Panama Canal Zone, then served in the Salvadoran Army. After serving in the 1st Infantry Brigade, he was promoted to the rank of colonel.

=== 1979 coup and Revolutionary Government Junta ===
In 1979, Colonel Majano was involved in a military conspiracy to overthrow the regime of Carlos Humberto Romero. After the coup on 15 October 1979, Majano became one of two army representatives in the Revolutionary Government Junta of El Salvador. Majano was considered the most important person in the junta.

On 13 December 1980 at a meeting of the command of the Salvadoran Army, Christian Democrat José Napoleón Duarte became President of the junta with Colonel Jaime Abdul Gutiérrez as vice president. Majano appointed to be the military attaché to Spain, however, he refused this appointment and accused the junta of supporting right-wing extremists. Majano resigned as Commander-in-Chief and Chairman of the Revolutionary Government Junta in May 1980 and was replaced with Jaime Abdul Gutiérrez. He resigned from the junta on 13 December 1980.

=== Arrest, release and exile ===
On the evening of 15 December, he convened a press conference at which he accused the junta of terrorism and the Christian Democratic Party of conciliation. The junta issued an order for the arrest of Majano, which immediately provoked a protest from the leaders of the Military Youth. The press often reported Majano's intention to join the Farabundo Martí National Liberation Front following his arrest warrant being issued. On 20 February 1981, Majano was arrested. He was arrested and imprisoned along with Roberto D'Aubuisson. He was released on 20 March 1981 and went into exile in Panama. When Panamanian President Omar Torrijos died in 1981, he moved to Mexico, and later to Canada in 1983. He returned to El Salvador in 1988 and survived an assassination attempt.

== Personal life ==
Majano currently lives in Canada, is married, and has four children.
