= LatinNews =

British newspaper

- Company type: limited company
- Industry: News media
- Founded: 1967
- Headquarters: London, UK
- Area served: Worldwide
- Products: Wire service

LatinNews (Latin American Newsletters) provides news services relating to Latin America. Its major publications include the Latin American Weekly Report (weekly), Latin American Economy and Business (monthly) and Latinnews Daily (daily).
