= José Guillermo García =

El Salvador general (born 1933)

General José Guillermo García

Minister of National Defense of El Salvador
- In office 15 October 1979 – April 1983
- President: Revolutionary Government Junta (until 1982); Álvaro Magaña (from 1982)
- Preceded by: Federico Castillo Yanes
- Succeeded by: Carlos Eugenio Vides Casanova

Personal details
- Born: José Guillermo García Merino; 25 June 1933 (age 93) San Vicente, El Salvador
- Occupation: Military officer

Military service
- Allegiance: El Salvador
- Branch/service: Salvadoran Army
- Rank: General
- Battles/wars: 1979 Salvadoran coup d'état Salvadoran Civil War

José Guillermo García Merino (born 25 June 1933) is a former general of the military of El Salvador and was minister of defense of the Revolutionary Government Junta of El Salvador between the years 1979 and 1983.

== Emigration to United States ==
He emigrated to the United States in 1989, where he lived until January 2016 until he was deported to El Salvador.

=== Lawsuit cases ===
He was sued, along with Carlos Eugenio Vides Casanova, in the United States district court in West Palm Beach in two precedent-setting legal actions:

- Ford v. Garcia, a lawsuit by the families of four Catholic churchwomen, including two Maryknoll Sisters of St. Dominic, who were murdered by a Salvadoran military death squad on 2 December 1980. García's defense won the case, and the families appealed. Their appeal was denied, and in 2003, the United States Supreme Court refused to hear further proceedings.
- Ramagoza v. Garcia, a lawsuit filed by the Center for Justice and Accountability on behalf of survivors of torture during the Salvadoran Civil War. García lost, and a judgment of over $54 million (U.S.) was entered against him and his co-defendant, and upheld on appeal.

=== Deportation to El Salvador ===
Guillermo García and General Vides Casanova had been undergoing a deportation process since 1999. The Department of Homeland Security later charged García in 2009 with participating or assisting in torture and extrajudicial killings during his tenure as Minister of Defense. His attorney Alina Cruz argued that he could not be deported on those grounds because he was already exonerated of those charges in the landmark case Ford vs. Garcia when a jury found that he was not in control of his troops. It was determined in 1998 that García's co-defendant General Vides Casanova and Casanova's cousin Col. Oscar Edgardo Casanova Vejar, the local military commander in Zacatecoluca, had planned and orchestrated the executions of the four North American churchwomen.

On 12 April 2014, an immigration court judge ruled against García and called for his deportation. On 16 December 2015, it was announced that an immigration appeals court upheld the decision to deport Garcia. Garcia's attorney afterwards said they both plan to appeal the decision to the Eleventh Circuit Court of Appeals in Atlanta, Georgia.

On 8 January 2016, American immigration officials deported General García back to El Salvador.

On 3 June 2025, Garcia was convicted by a jury in Chalatenango for the Santa Rita massacre in 1982 and sentenced to 15 years' imprisonment.

== See also ==
- Juan Romagoza Arce
- Carlos Eugenio Vides Casanova
- Western Hemisphere Institute for Security Cooperation
- Maura Clarke
- Jean Donovan
- Ita Ford
- Dorothy Kazel
- Salvadoran Civil War
