= José Antonio Morales Ehrlich =

Salvadoran politician (1935–2021)

Doctor José Antonio Morales Ehrlich
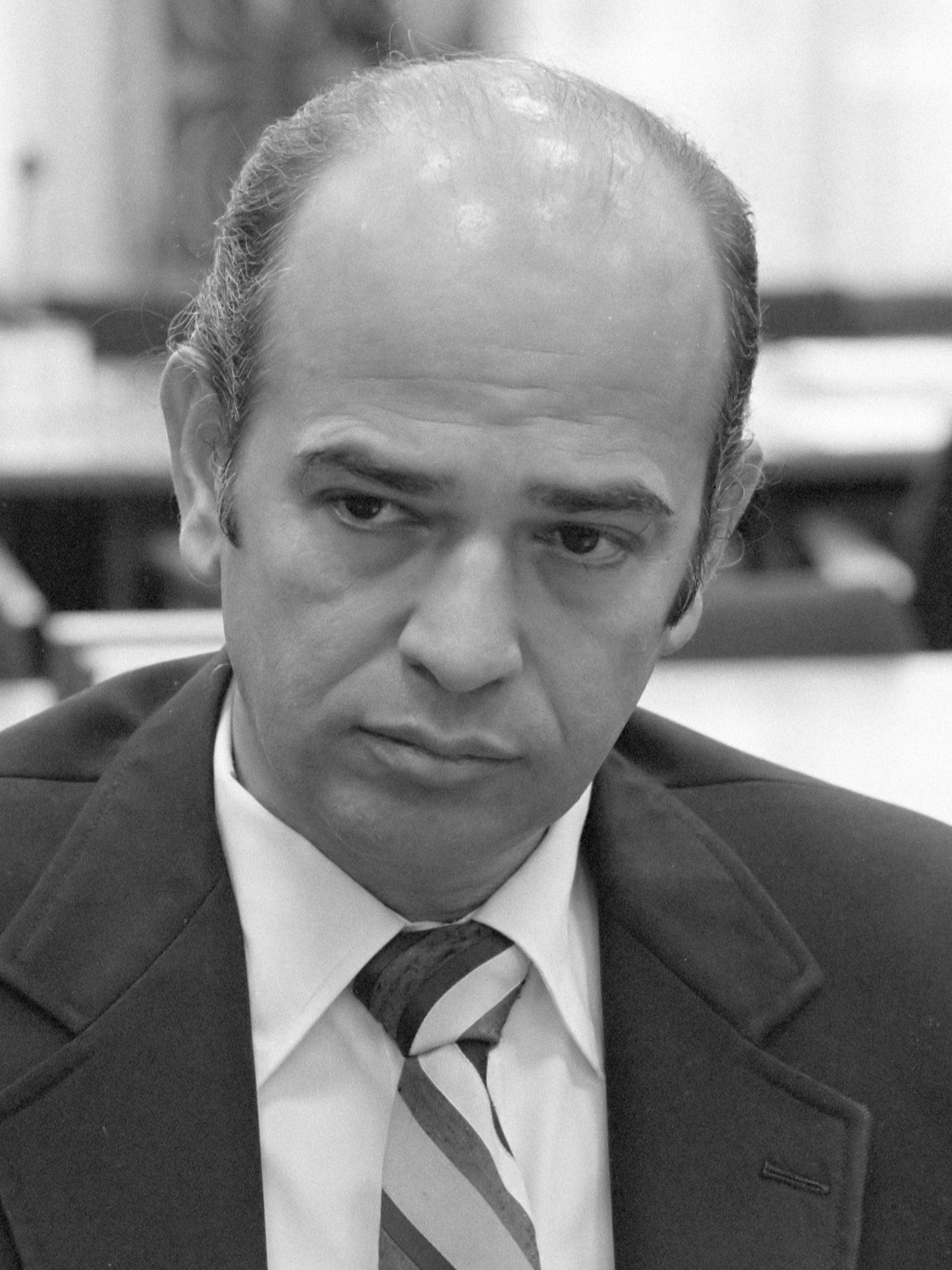
- Morales Ehrlich in 1981.

Member of the Revolutionary Government Junta
- In office 9 January 1980 – 2 May 1982

112th & 118th Mayor of San Salvador
- In office 1 May 1985 – 1 May 1988
- Preceded by: José Alejandro Duarte Durán
- Succeeded by: Armando Calderón Sol
- In office 1 May 1974 – 1 May 1976
- Preceded by: Carlos Herrera Rebollo
- Succeeded by: José Napoleón Gómez

Deputy of the Central American Parliament
- In office 28 October 1996 – 28 October 2001

Secretary General of the Christian Democratic Party
- In office 1990–2001

Personal details
- Born: 3 July 1935 Santa Ana, El Salvador
- Died: 26 June 2021 (aged 85) San Salvador, El Salvador
- Party: Christian Democratic Party
- Spouse: Marina Carbonell
- Children: 3 (at least)
- Occupation: Politician

José Antonio Morales Ehrlich, also spelt Erlich (3 July 1935 – 26 June 2021), was a Salvadoran politician from the Christian Democratic Party who was a member of the Revolutionary Government Junta of El Salvador from 1980 to 1982.

Morales Ehrlich died of natural causes at the age of 85 on 26 June 2021.
