= José Ramón Ávalos Navarrete =

Salvadoran politician

José Ramón Ávalos Navarrete (2 January 1935 – 5 July 2021 ) was a Salvadoran politician who was a member of the Revolutionary Government Junta from 1980 to 1982.

He was born in the municipality of Quezaltepeque to Carmen Navarrete and José Lorenzo Avalos. His mother died after the birth of his younger brother when Jose Ramon was two years old, and he and his brother were adopted by a family friend. In his youth, he attended a local Jesuit school, and later went onto medical school. While training for his degree, he married his first wife and had a son. They divorced within the year. After graduating, he met and married Anna Miriam Sanchez, and had their oldest daughter a year after. Soon after that, Jose Ramon moved to the United States to finish his residency and training. While there he and his wife had two more girls. They then returned to El Salvador where their fourth daughter was born in 1977. At the time, political unrest in El Salvador was growing, and after the Salvadoran Civil War broke out, Avalos was appointed as a civilian member of the Second Revolutionary Government Junta formed on 9 January 1980. He later went back to work as a cardiac surgeon until the age of 62.
