= Revolutionary Government Junta of El Salvador =

Three military dictatorships in El Salvador

Revolutionary Government Junta Junta Revolucionaria de Gobierno
- 1979–1982
- Flag Coat of arms
- Motto: "Dios, Unión, Libertad" (Spanish); English: "God, Unity, Freedom"
- Anthem: Himno Nacional de El Salvador; English: "National Anthem of El Salvador"
- Capital: San Salvador
- Common languages: Spanish
- Demonym: Salvadoran
- Government: Military dictatorship
- Historical era: Cold War – Salvadoran Civil War
  - Coup d'état: 15 October 1979
  - First Junta: 18 October 1979
  - Second Junta: 9 January 1980
  - Third Junta: 13 December 1980
  - Transition to democracy: 2 May 1982
- Currency: Salvadoran colón
- ISO 3166 code: SV
Preceded by	Succeeded by
Military dictatorship	Republic of El Salvador
- Today part of: El Salvador

The Revolutionary Government Junta (Spanish: Junta Revolucionaria de Gobierno, JRG) was the name of three consecutive joint civilian-military dictatorships that ruled El Salvador between 15 October 1979 and 2 May 1982.

The first junta, from 1979 to 1980, consisted of two colonels, Adolfo Arnoldo Majano and Jaime Abdul Gutiérrez, and three civilians, Guillermo Ungo, Mario Antonio Andino and Román Mayorga Quirós. The second junta, from January through December 1980, consisted of Majano and Gutiérrez, and José Antonio Morales Ehrlich, Héctor Dada Hirezi, and José Ramón Ávalos Navarrete. The final junta, from 1980 to 1982, consisted of Gutiérrez, Morales Ehrlich, Ávalos Navarrete, with José Napoleón Duarte as the junta's president.

The Revolutionary Government Junta was the source of many human rights violations that were committed across the country during its rule.

== Background and coup ==
The National Conciliation Party (PCN) ruled El Salvador from 1962 to 1979 as an effective one-party system. The PCN had diplomatic support from the United States and the CIA trained and funded the Salvadoran Armed Forces. The party maintained control of the country through fraudulent elections, political intimidation, and state-sponsored terrorism against civilians and leftist groups.

In March 1979, President Carlos Humberto Romero had soldiers crush protests and strikes against his government to prevent a revolution in El Salvador from starting, similar to the revolution in Nicaragua which had begun the previous year. The eventual overthrow of Nicaraguan President Anastasio Somoza Debayle in September 1979 prompted many military officers to remove Romero and replace him with a stronger government which was able to prevent such a revolution. The military gained the support of the US government and organized itself under Colonels Adolfo Arnoldo Majano and Jaime Abdul Gutiérrez.

The military launched a coup d'état on 15 October 1979 and forced Romero to resign and go into exile. Many high-ranking military officials who were loyal to Romero, such as the Minister of National Defense and the Director of the National Guard, also resigned and went into exile. The coup is often cited as the beginning of the Salvadoran Civil War.

== First Junta ==
The first junta. Left to right: Jaime Abdul Gutiérrez, Mario Antonio Andino, Román Mayorga Quirós, Guillermo Manuel Ungo, Adolfo Arnoldo Majano.

Three days after the coup on 18 October 1979, Majano and Gutiérrez established the First Revolutionary Government Junta. It consisted of two military officers (Majano and Gutiérrez) and three civilians; Guillermo Manuel Ungo Revelo, a democratic socialist politician from the National Revolutionary Movement (MNR), Mario Antonio Andino, the ex-vice president of the Chamber of Commerce and Industry of El Salvador (CCIES), and Román Mayorga Quirós, a rector of the Central American University.

The junta styled itself as a "reformist junta" which rose to power via a "reformist coup" led by "reformist officers" in the military. The junta promised to redistribute wealth and implement several nation-wide reforms, including economic, political, and agrarian reforms. Promises to end human rights violations and political oppression were also made. The first reform put into place was the abolition of the National Democratic Organization (ORDEN), an organization composed of several right-wing paramilitaries that tortured political opponents, intimidated voters, rigged elections, and killed peasants. During the abolition of ORDEN, the paramilitaries themselves were not dissolved, however, and they operated independently and committed various atrocities during the civil war. The "reformist junta," meanwhile, utilized its own death squads to commit human rights violations during the civil war. Archbishop Óscar Arnulfo Romero y Galdámez cautiously endorsed the coup and the junta stating that the goals and reforms were good-willed.

The junta immediately faced problems from both the political right and left. In the weeks following the coup, thousands of civilians and members of the Unified Popular Action Front (FAPU), Popular Leagues "February 28" (LP-28), and People's Revolutionary Bloc (BRP), marched in the streets of San Salvador demanding the release of all the information on the victims of the military regime. They also demanded that the junta follow through with their promises of reform and also include wage increases, lower consumer prices, and public trials of military officers who had previously committed human rights abuses against the people. Meanwhile, wealthy landowners and businessmen, most of whom had affiliations with the National Association of Private Enterprise (ANEP), opposed the reforms the junta promised to implement.

The leaders of the junta attempted to cater to the left to prevent an uprising by raising wages 30% and attempting to implement agrarian reforms by bringing members of the agriculture and reform bodies together to plan and then execute the reform. Despite ambitious beginnings the reform as laid out failed however some successes did result and Phase I, dealing with land over 500 hectares, mostly succeeded: "By the end of 1986, ISTA had expropriated 469 estates throughout the country." Montero says that co-operative members report: "On March 5th, we went to sleep as poor colonos [sharecroppers]. On March 6th, we woke up rich, as landholders." Velis Polío wrote that: "The reform was an economic, political and social earthquake in the countryside...Landholders saw before their eyes something that they never imagined could possibly happen on the lands that they had always governed absolutely." Overall "Approximately 20% of all of El Salvador’s farm land was expropriated during Phase I of the agrarian reform. This expropriated land made up 14 percent of total coffee land, 31 percent of cotton land, and 24 percent of all sugarcane land in El Salvador. Roughly 31,000 working families, or one-fifth of agricultural laborers, in El Salvador, benefited from the land reform." Phase II, dealing with land over 100 hectares, was delayed until 1982 and scrapped after opposition by hacienda owners. Unlike Phase I, which gave the land to co-operatives, Phase III, dealing with providing up to 7 hectare lots to individual families, was also a failure although land was transferred, "However, between January 1981 and August 1982 37,880 petitions were made and FINATA granted 32,748 provisional titles, 251 definitive titles, paid ₵1.4 million ($560,000) in compensation and received ₵842,000 ($337,000) in voluntary payments from smallholders towards amortisation of their debts." Martin Diskin indicates that by 1984 "only 63,611 have thus far applied" and despite the fact "the present administration of FINATA has carried out its responsibilities with considerable energy, intelligence, and honesty", only 47,001 households (16.8% less than the expected figure.) received land. Regions under military control experienced smoother transfers but widespread evictions by landlords of potential claimants occurred including intimidation by paramilitaries although the military did provide protection and restorations occurred to varying degrees of success. Diskin in 1984 indicates that "the typical beneficiary of Phase III...quite closely fits the description of the "rural poor" done by the AID in 1977." On the other hand Mitchell A. Seligson writes in 1995 that "The land-poor population in El Salvador is defined here as those farming less than 1 manzana (0.7 hectare) of land..." because "...analysis of the EHPM income data revealed that farmers who own 1 manzana or more of land earn incomes that match or exceed those who have steady jobs in the industrial sector." Thus Phase III although not living up to its objectives did ameliorate the land crisis in El Salvador by improving campesino income.

Samuel Anthony McReynolds wrote:

While there is no question that influential political forces in El Salvador have tried to reduce the extent of the reform, this also is not unusual. If it were not the case, and the ruling elite had willingly supported reform, then there is little likelihood that reform would have been needed in the first place. Despite these limiting factors, nearly 20% of the land and rural households were affected by the reform. While this is dismissed as insufficient, it should be noted that, with the exception of Nicaragua, this is a higher percentage than in any other land reform in Latin America. It is even higher than the vaunted reform in Taiwan.

Meanwhile, the Army and National Guard continued to kill anyone suspected of being a leftist militant. By the end of October 1979, over 100 civilians had been killed by the Army and the National Guard, but the junta claimed that the acts were committed by forces not under its control.

From 2–5 January 1980, the three civilian members of the junta resigned. The entire cabinet, except the Minister of National Defense, Brigadier General José Guillermo García, also resigned. Majano and Gutiérrez remained in place and organized the creation of a second junta.

== Second Junta ==
The second junta. Left to right: Jaime Abdul Gutiérrez, José Ramón Ávalos Navarrete, Adolfo Arnoldo Majano, Héctor Dada Hirezi, José Antonio Morales Ehrlich.

The Second Revolutionary Government Junta was formed on 9 January 1980. The second junta consisted, again, of two military officers (Majano and Gutiérrez) and three civilians; José Ramón Ávalos Navarrete, an independent politician and a doctor, José Antonio Morales Ehrlich, a conservative member of the Christian Democratic Party (PDC), and Héctor Dada Hirezi, a progressive member of the PDC. Dada Hirezi resigned on 3 March 1980 after Mario Zamora, another progressive PDC politician, was assassinated by a far-right death squad. He was replaced by José Napoleón Duarte, another member of the PDC and former presidential candidate of the National Opposition Union (UNO) during the 1972 presidential election.

On the same day that the second junta formed, leftist groups created the Political Military Coordinating Committee (CPM) to combat the junta and the army. It was a coalition of the Popular Liberation Forces (FPL), Armed Forces of National Resistance (FARN), and the Communist Party of El Salvador (PCES). Two days later, the Revolutionary Coordinating Committee of the Masses (CRM) was created between the Unified Popular Action Front (FAPU), Popular Leagues "February 28" (LP-28), People's Revolutionary Bloc (BRP), and the Nationalist Democratic Union (UDN). The CRM had four goals: 1.) Overthrow the junta and end American imperialism, 2.) end the dominance of the oligarchy and nationalize land and industry, 3.) Assure democratic rights for the people, and 4.) Raise cultural standards, stimulate popular organizations, and create a new revolutionary armed forces.

On 22 January 1980, the 48th anniversary of La Matanza, the massacre of 10,000–40,000 indigenous and communist rebels by the government of President Maximiliano Hernández Martínez, around 80,000 to 200,000 people marched in the streets of San Salvador. According to the Salvadoran Human Rights Commission, the National Guard killed 67 people and injured 250. On 8 March 1980, the junta approved the new agrarian reforms and nationalized the national bank.

A death squad, acting under the orders of Major Roberto D'Aubuisson, assassinated Archbishop Romero while giving mass on 24 March. Around 250,000 people attended his funeral on 30 March and around 40 were killed by gunfire which is believed to have come from the National Guard. Majano, gave press statements stating that Interpol had the list of suspects in Romero's murder and that he would give that report to the judge assigned to the case, the Fourth Judge of Criminal Atilio Ramírez Amaya. The judge was nearly assassinated when armed men arrived to kill him at his residence. On 8 May, the army arrested D'Aubuisson during a meeting in which information allegedly related to the assassination of Romero was seized. An agenda of Captain Álvaro Saravia was seized under the name "Operation Pineapple." D'Aubuisson was not tried for the murder, nor for treason, despite him attempting to overthrow the junta on 30 April, and he was released from prison in May 1980. He later founded the Nationalist Republican Alliance (ARENA) in September 1981.

The Mass Revolutionary Coordinator joined the Salvadoran Democratic Front (FDS) to form the Revolutionary Democratic Front (FDR) at the University of El Salvador on 17 April. The Unified Revolutionary Directorate (DRU) was then formed on 22 May. The junta was concerned of the popularity and influence of the FDR and sent the army to university to disperse the group. Around 20 people were killed in the event.

On 10 October, the Farabundo Martí People's Forces of Liberation (FPL), Communist Party of El Salvador (PCES), National Resistance (RN), People's Revolutionary Army (ERP), and the Revolutionary Party of the Central American Workers – El Salvador (PRTC), joined forces to form the Farabundo Martí National Liberation Front (FMLN). The group was named after Augustín Farabundo Martí Rodríguez, the communist leader of the 1932 uprising.

Majano resigned as Chairman of the Junta and Commander-in-Chief of the Armed Forces on 14 May and gave the positions to Gutiérrez, but he remained as a member of the junta. However, due to pressure from Gutiérrez and the United States to step down, Majano resigned from the junta entirely on 13 December 1980, effectively ending the second junta. The junta then filed a warrant for Majano's arrest. He was arrested by army on 20 February 1981 on charges of military disobedience, released on 20 March, and left for exile in Panama.

== Third Junta ==
The third junta. Left to right: José Ramón Ávalos Navarrete, Jaime Abdul Gutiérrez, José Napoleón Duarte, José Antonio Morales Ehrlich.

After the resignation of Majano on 13 December 1980, the Third Revolutionary Government Junta was formed. It consisted of the members of the previous junta: Gutiérrez, Duarte, Morales Ehrlich, and Ávalos Navarrete. Duarte served as the President of the junta while Gutiérrez served as vice president. The third junta continued the implementation of the agrarian reforms and promised democratization. The United States, under President Ronald Reagan, continued economic aid and diplomatic support to the junta.

The FMLN launched the "Final Offensive" to overthrow the government and take control of the country on 10 January 1981. The junta contained the offensive, and by the end of January, the offensive ended in a strategic failure for the FMLN, but they did prove that they were a capable fighting force. The junta responded to the offensive by launching their own scorched-earth offensive in March 1981 in northern El Salvador.

On 17 March 1982, 4 Dutch journalists and 5 FMLN guerrillas were ambushed by the army near the town of Santa Rita, Chalatenango, with 8 being killed in the attack. The attack outraged many, especially in the Netherlands, where people demanded the removal of the junta from power. Duarte stated that it was not an attack but instead simply an accident and that the journalists were caught in the crossfire between army soldiers and FMLN guerrillas.

=== Democratization ===
In order to democratize the country, the junta scheduled a legislative election for 28 March 1982 and a presidential election for 29 April 1982. The legislative election resulted in the Christian Democratic Party (PDC) gaining the most seats at 24. The Nationalist Republican Alliance (ARENA) gained 19, the National Conciliation Party (PCN) gained 14, and other minor parties gained the final 3 seats. During the presidential election, only members of the Constitutional Assembly were allowed to vote. The PDC, PCN, and minor Democratic Action (AD) joined in a coalition and elected Álvaro Magaña as president, defeating ARENA candidate, Hugo César Barrera, by a margin of 36 to 17 with 7 abstentions. D'Aubuisson accused Gutiérrez of fixing the election in Magaña's favor. Magaña was inaugurated as president of El Salvador on 2 May 1982, the first civilian president since Arturo Araujo in 1931.

The assumption of Magaña ended the rule of the Revolutionary Government Junta of El Salvador. Duarte continued to serve in politics and became president in 1984 while Gutiérrez retired from military life.

== Human rights violations ==
From 1979 to 1982, the junta committed various human rights violations and war crimes. Several death squads and paramilitary groups were formed by junta soldiers and officers with backing from the United States against leftist militants and civilians.

The most notorious U.S.-trained army battalion was the Atlácatl Battalion. The battalion committed two of the deadliest massacres during the civil war: El Calabozo and El Mozote. Meanwhile, the National Guard, the No. 1 Military Detachment, and paramilitaries that were formerly a part of ORDEN committed the Sumpul River massacre on the Honduran border.

== See also ==
- 1979 Salvadoran coup d'état
- Right-wing paramilitarism in El Salvador
- Salvadoran Civil War
- Junta of National Reconstruction

Political offices
Preceded by Carlos Humberto Romero Mena	Revolutionary Government Junta; 1979–1982	Succeeded by Álvaro Alfredo Magaña Borja
