= José Alberto Medrano =

Salvadoran general (1917–1985)

- Born: 2 November 1917; El Salvador
- Died: 23 March 1985 (aged 67); El Salvador
- Allegiance: El Salvador
- Branch: Salvadoran Army
- Rank: General
- Commands: National Guard; ANSESAL; ORDEN
- Battles / wars: Football War; Salvadoran Civil War

José Alberto Medrano (2 November 1917 – 23 March 1985) was a Salvadoran general who, starting in the 1960s, headed the National Security Agency of El Salvador (ANSESAL) and the Nationalist Democratic Organization (ORDEN), a paramilitary group supported by the Green Berets. ORDEN was later accused by Amnesty International of using "clandestine terror against government opponents."

== Early life ==
Medrano was born on November 2, 1917 in San Salvador, El Salvador. On April 10, 1946, he married a woman named Marta Ruth Nuila.

== Career ==
Medrano became Chief of the National Guard of El Salvador sometime prior to 1962, when he created the ORDEN death squad, in addition to the Salvadoran National Security Agency. In El Salvador, he is sometimes considered the father of the country’s death squads. In 1969, he participated in the Football War with Honduras, crossing the border on a donkey disguised as a monk. He retired sometime prior to 1985.

== Death ==
Medrano was killed in San Salvador on March 23, 1985. He was shot as he arrived at a theater by suspected leftist guerillas.
