= Juan Romagoza Arce =

Salvadoran surgeon and director

Juan Romagoza Arze
- Born: Usulután, El Salvador
- Citizenship: El Salvador; United States
- Education: University of El Salvador
- Occupation: Surgeon
- Years active: 1980–present

Juan Romagoza Arce is a Salvadoran surgeon, political activist, and former refugee with dual Salvadoran-American citizenship. As a physician, he treated rural Salvadorans during the Salvadoran Civil War, and was tortured by the National Guard. After escaping, he became a refugee in Mexico and later the United States, where he became director of La Clínica del Pueblo in Washington, D.C. Arce was one of the plaintiffs in the landmark Arce v. García (2006) case.

== Early life and education ==
Romagoza was born in Usulután, El Salvador. At the age of 19 in 1970, he enrolled in medical school at the University of El Salvador with the intention of becoming a heart surgeon. During his surgeon rotation practice, Romagoza worked in poor and rural areas and witnessed violence and repression by government forces during the Salvadoran Civil War against the poor, church workers, and the medical personal that aid them.

== Kidnapping, torture, and escape ==
In December 1980, while Romagoza was providing medical care at a church clinic in Santa Anita, Chalatenango, two army vehicles arrived to the clinic and opened fire on the people. Romagoza was shot in the foot, kidnapped, and jailed at National Guard headquarters in San Salvador for 22 days. While jailed, Romagoza was interrogated and tortured three or four times per day. Torture methods included electric shocks, cigarette burns, sexual assault, and water torture, and being hung by his fingers.

In one torture session, he was shot in his left hand in presence of Carlos Eugenio Vides Casanova, the future Minister of National Defense. Romagoza escaped with the help of his uncles in January 1981. Due to his detention, he lost 80 pounds and lost his ability to perform surgery due to the injuries inflicted. He had to be physically carried out by his uncle.

After escaping, Romagoza left El Salvador and fled to Guatemala. He later fled to Mexico City, where he lived in a boarding house with other refugees from El Salvador. While in Mexico, he imitated a Chiapas accent to evade detention, and found work in a restaurant.

== Life in the United States ==
Romagoza found refuge in the United States in April 1983. He became an American citizen in 1986 and was granted political asylum in 1987.

=== Central American Refugee Center ===
Ramagoza became active in assisting the refugee communities and co-founded the Central American Refugee Center (CRECE).

=== La Clínica del Pueblo ===
Romagoza worked at La Clínica del Pueblo, where he became executive director in 1987 and this was a second opportunity for Romagoza to serve free medical care to poor or low income people. Regarding his work, he stated "I work for the poor because I am poor... My family is poor."

=== Ramagoza v. García ===
Ramagoza v. Garcia was a lawsuit filed by the Center for Justice and Accountability on behalf of survivors of torture during the Salvadoran Civil War. General José Guillermo García lost, and a judgment of over US$54 million was entered against him and his co-defendant, and upheld on appeal.

== Return to El Salvador ==
=== Clinic El Espino ===
In 2008, Ramagoza returned to El Salvador and founded the Clinic El Espino in Usulután, El Salvador, where he provides free medical treatment to the communities where he began his career.

== Recognition ==
Romagoza's life and work were central to the narrative of Everyone Who Is Gone Is Here (2024), a nonfiction book by Jonathan Blitzer that covers U.S.-Central American immigration policy.
