= Mauricio Gutiérrez Castro =

Salvadoran politician

Vice President of El Salvador
- In office 2 May 1982 – 1 June 1984 Serving with Raúl Molina Martínez and Pablo Mauricio Alvergue
- President: Álvaro Magaña
- Preceded by: Julio Ernesto Astacio
- Succeeded by: Rodolfo Antonio Castillo Claramount

President of the Supreme Court of Justice
- In office 1989–1994 Serving with Ricardo Armando Novoa Arciniegas
- President: Alfredo Cristiani
- Preceded by: Francisco José Guerrero
- Succeeded by: José Domingo Méndez

Personal details
- Born: 18 March 1942 (age 84) Santa Ana, El Salvador
- Party: Nationalist Republican Alliance

Gabriel Mauricio Gutiérrez Castro (born 18 March 1942) is a Salvadoran former politician who served as one of three Vice President of El Salvador from 2 May 1982 to 1 June 1984 during the presidency of Álvaro Magaña. He was designed as the second vice president. Gutiérrez is a member of Nationalist Republican Alliance.

Gutiérrez was born on 18 March 1942 in Santa Ana. He has a law degree, and was a professor of public law in University of El Salvador.

Gutiérrez was the president of national commission of tourism. In 1973 he was appointed as the governor of Santa Ana department. From 1974 to 1977, he was a member of Legislative Assembly of El Salvador.

Gutiérrez Castro was also the President of the Supreme Court of Justice, appointed during the Alfredo Cristiani administration.
