= Pablo Mauricio Alvergue =

El Salvadorian politician

Vice President of El Salvador
- In office 2 May 1982 – 1 June 1984 Serving with Raúl Molina Martínez and Mauricio Gutiérrez Castro
- President: Álvaro Magaña
- Preceded by: Julio Ernesto Astacio
- Succeeded by: Rodolfo Antonio Castillo Claramount

Personal details
- Born: 25 January 1930
- Died: 6 February 2024 (aged 94)
- Party: Christian Democratic Party

Pablo Mauricio Alvergue Rovira (25 January 1930 – 6 February 2024) was a vice president of El Salvador in the cabinet of Álvaro Magaña from 1982 to 1984.

He was a member of Christian Democratic Party.

Alvergue was minister of the interior in 1980. Legislative Assembly of El Salvador elected him as third vice president of Álvaro Magaña in May 1982. Rodolfo Antonio Castillo Claramount succeeded him as vice president in June 1984. Later in the 1980s, Alvergue served as Salvadoran ambassador to Washington D.C. In 1989 he was attorney of former president José Napoleón Duarte. He was also the president of the Christian Democratic Party.

Later, Alvergue was a deputy of El Salvador in Central American Parliament.

Alvergue owned a large farm south of San Salvador.
