= Death squads in El Salvador =

1960s–1990s paramilitary groups in El Salvador

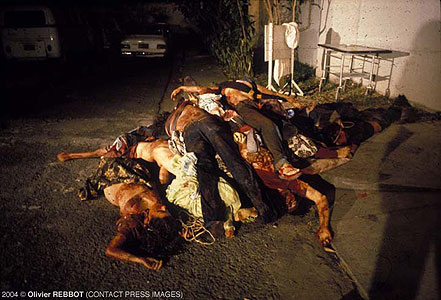
Death squad victims in San Salvador, c. 1981

Death squads in El Salvador (Spanish: escuadrones de la muerte) were far-right paramilitary groups acting in opposition to Marxist–Leninist guerrilla forces, most notably of the Farabundo Martí National Liberation Front (FMLN), and their allies among the civilian population before, during, and after the Salvadoran Civil War. The death squads committed the vast majority of the murders and massacres during the civil war from 1979 to 1992 and were heavily aligned with the United States-backed government.

According to the Attorney for the Defense of Human Rights (PDDH), death squads remain active in El Salvador. The PDDH registered 25 extrajudicial executions of gang members between May 2022 and May 2023 which it attributed to death squad activity during the country's gang crackdown.

== History ==
=== Pre-civil war ===
Throughout the 1960s and 1970s, many political groups arose in opposition to the military government of the National Conciliation Party (PCN). The Christian Democratic Party (PDC) was the chief opponent of the PCN, gaining significant influence in the Legislative Assembly. In the 1972 presidential election, PDC candidate José Napoleón Duarte, under the banner of the National Opposition Union (UNO), was declared to have won the election by 6,000 votes by the Central Election Board, but the result was canceled and the Legislative Assembly voted PCN candidate Arturo Armando Molina as president.

Other, less political groups which appeared included the United Front for Revolutionary Action (FUAR), Party of Renovation (PAR), Unitary Syndical Federation of El Salvador (FUSS), and the Christian Federation of Salvadoran Peasants (FECCAS). In order to combat the political and militant opposition to the government, President Julio Adalberto Rivera Carballo established the Nationalist Democratic Organization (ORDEN). The organization was headed by General José Alberto Medrano and placed under the administration of the National Security Agency of El Salvador (ANSESAL). ORDEN was a group of several government controlled death squads which were used to arrest and torture political opponents, intimidate voters, rig elections, and kill peasants. ORDEN claimed to have somewhere from 50,000 to 100,000 members at its peak in the late 1960s.

=== During the civil war ===
During the Salvadoran Civil War, the Revolutionary Government Junta of El Salvador officially dissolved the Nationalist Democratic Organization, leaving its paramilitaries to break free and operate independently. The paramilitaries openly targeted members of the FMLN and civilians, notably workers of human rights organizations.

Despite officially having no connection to the government, the death squads and paramilitaries were almost always soldiers from the Armed Forces of El Salvador, meaning the death squads were indirectly funded and armed by the United States. Further funding also came from right-wing politicians and businessmen. Several death squads held fascist ideologies.

=== Post-civil war ===
During negotiations to end the civil war in what are now the Chapultepec Peace Accords, part of the agreements were that the government of El Salvador would crack down on and suppress the paramilitaries that fought alongside them during the civil war. The accords stated that the government would "[s]uppress paramilitary entities (Civil Defense Patrols)."

Most of the paramilitaries that existed in the country before and during the civil war have since ceased to exist but one notable exception, Sombra Negra, continues to operate in the country, targeting gang members of MS-13 and 18th Street Gang as a form of vigilante justice.

== Human rights violations ==
During the civil war, the paramilitaries, often labeled as death squads, came to public attention when on March 24, 1980, Archbishop of San Salvador Óscar Romero was assassinated while giving Mass. The Salvadoran government investigated but was unable to identify who assassinated Romero. The investigation did identify Major Roberto D'Aubuisson, a neo-fascist who commanded several death squads during the civil war, as having ordered the assassination.

The US-trained Atlácatl Battalion of the Salvadoran Army was responsible for committing two of the largest massacres during the civil war: the El Mozote massacre and the El Calabozo massacre.

Sombra Negra tortured victims, mostly gang members, and killed them with a point-blank shot to the head.

== List of paramilitaries ==
- Atlácatl Battalion (Batallón Atlácatl; BA)
- Anti-Communist Brigade of the East (Brigada Anticomunista de Oriente; BACO)
- Anti-Communist Front for the Liberation of Central America (Frente Anticomunista para la Liberación de Centroamérica; FALCA)
- Anti-Communist Political Front (Frente Político Anticomunista; FPAC)
- Armed Forces of Anti-Communist Liberation – War of Elimination (Fuerzas Armadas de Liberación Anticomunista – Guerra de Eliminación; FALANGE)
- Black Shadow (Sombra Negra; SN)
- General Eusebio Bracamonte Battalion (Batallón General Eusebio Bracamonte; BGEB)
- General Manuel José Arce Battalion (Batallón General Manuel José Arce; BGMJA)
- Group of Social Extermination (Grupo de Exterminio Social; GES)
- Legion of the Caribe (Legión del Caribe; LC)
- Maximiliano Hernández Martínez Anti-Communist Brigade (Brigada Anticomunista Maximiliano Hernández Martínez; MHM)
- National Security Agency of El Salvador (Agencia Nacional de Seguridad Salvadoreña; ANSESAL)
- Nationalist Democratic Organization (Organización Democrática Nacionalista; ORDEN)
- Organization for the Liberation from Communism (Organización para la Liberación del Comunismo; OLC)
- Patriotic Association of Liberty or Slavery (Asociación Patriótica de Libertad o Esclavitud; APLE)
- Salvadoran Anti-Communist Brigade (Brigada Anticomunista Salvadoreña; BACSA)
- Salvadoran Anti-Communist Command (Comando Anticomunista Salvadoreño; CAS)
- Salvadoran Proletariat Brigade (Brigadas Proletarias Salvadoreñas; BPS)
- Secret Anti-Communist Army (Ejército Secreto Anticomunista; ESA)
- Squadron of Death (Escuadrón de la Muerte; EM)
- White Warrior's Union (Unión Guerrera Blanca; UGB, also called Mano Blanca)

== See also ==
- Human rights in El Salvador
