= Guillermo Ungo =

Salvadoran politician

Guillermo Manuel Ungo Revelo (September 3, 1931 – February 28, 1991) was a Salvadoran social democratic politician. He was a member of the ruling government junta from 1979 to 1980. Ungo was for a time the unofficial leader of the opposition in his capacity as president of the Revolutionary Democratic Front alliance. He ran in the Salvadoran presidential election of 1972 as the vice presidential running mate of Christian democrat José Napoleón Duarte. Official results showed a victory for the military-backed candidate, Arturo Armando Molina, though the fairness of the election was widely disputed.

He returned from a long exile in November 1987 with the other leading opposition politician, Rubén Zamora, a political ally. Their respective organizations merged in December 1987 into the Democratic Convergence, but this new group did not contribute candidates in the parliamentary elections of 1988.
