= Mario Antonio Andino =

Salvadoran politician

Mario Antonio Andino Gómez was a Salvadoran politician who was the vice president of the Chamber of Commerce and Industry of El Salvador (CCIES) and a member of the Revolutionary Government Junta of El Salvador from 1979 to 1980.
