= Raúl Molina Martínez =

Salvadoran politician

Vice President of El Salvador
- In office 2 May 1982 – 1 June 1984 Serving with Mauricio Gutiérrez Castro and Pablo Mauricio Alvergue
- President: Álvaro Magaña
- Preceded by: Julio Ernesto Astacio
- Succeeded by: Rodolfo Antonio Castillo Claramount

Personal details
- Born: 1938 (age 87–88)
- Party: National Conciliation Party

Raúl Molina Martínez (born 1938) is a Salvadoran former politician who was one of three Vice President of El Salvador from 2 May 1982 to 1 June 1984, during the presidency of Álvaro Magaña. He was designed as the first vice president.

He is a member of National Conciliation Party.
