= Román Mayorga Quirós =

Salvadoran politician

Román Mayorga Quirós was a Salvadoran politician who was a member of the Central American University and a member of the Revolutionary Government Junta of El Salvador from 1979 to 1980.
