= Roberto D'Aubuisson =

Salvadoran politician

Major Roberto D'Aubuisson

90th President of the Legislative Assembly of El Salvador
- In office 26 April 1982 – 20 December 1983
- Preceded by: José Leandro Echeverría
- Succeeded by: María Julia Castillo Rodas

Deputy of the Legislative Assembly of El Salvador from La Libertad
- In office 1 May 1988 – 20 February 1992

Deputy of the Legislative Assembly of El Salvador from San Salvador
- In office 26 April 1982 – 1 May 1988

Personal details
- Born: Roberto D'Aubuisson Arrieta; 23 August 1943 Santa Tecla, El Salvador
- Died: 20 February 1992 (aged 48) San Salvador, El Salvador
- Party: Nationalist Republican Alliance
- Spouse(s): Yolanda Munguía (divorced); Luz María Angulo (his death)
- Children: 4
- Relatives: Maribel Arrieta (cousin)
- Education: Captain General Gerardo Barrios Military School; School of the Americas
- Occupation: Military officer, politician
- Known for: Ordering the assassination of Óscar Romero
- Nickname(s): Chele, Blowtorch Bob, The Major

Military service
- Allegiance: El Salvador
- Branch/service: Salvadoran Army
- Years of service: 1963–1980
- Rank: Major
- Unit: National Guard
- Commands: Death squads
- Battles/wars: Salvadoran Civil War

Roberto D'Aubuisson Arrieta (dohb-wee-SOHN; 23 August 1943 – 20 February 1992) was a Salvadoran military officer, neo-fascist politician, and death squad leader. In 1981, he co-founded and became the first leader of the far-right Nationalist Republican Alliance (ARENA) and served as president of the Legislative Assembly from 1982 to 1983. He was a presidential candidate for 1984 presidential election, losing in the second round to José Napoleón Duarte, the former president of the Revolutionary Government Junta.

After ARENA's loss in the 1985 legislative elections, D'Aubuisson stepped down in favor of Alfredo Cristiani and was designated as the party's honorary president for life. D'Aubuisson was named by the United Nations' Truth Commission for El Salvador as having ordered the assassination of Óscar Romero, the archbishop of San Salvador in 1980.

== Early life ==
Roberto D'Aubuisson Arrieta was born on 23 August 1943 in Santa Tecla, El Salvador. His father was Roberto d'Aubuisson Andrade, and his mother was Joaquina Arrieta Alvarado, a career civil servant. He is the descendant of Jacques Marie Germain Gustave d'Aubuisson, who was born in Toulouse, France in 1822 and arrived in El Salvador at the age of 20, where he established himself as an ironmonger and salesman. His father, Pierre d'Aubuisson, was Marquis and Lord of Nailloux and Ramonville-Saint-Agne.

D'Aubuisson enrolled in the Captain General Gerardo Barrios Military School in 1958 at the age of 15 and graduated in 1963, becoming a member of the National Guard. He was part of La Tandona, the class of 1966 at the Captain General Gerardo Barrios Military School. In 1972, he was trained in communications at the School of the Americas, a United States Department of Defense Institute that provides military training to government personnel in US-allied Latin American nations. After completing his studies at the institute, he became a member of the Salvadoran military intelligence. D'Aubuisson was also educated at the Taiwanese Fu Hsing Kang College.

== Death squads ==
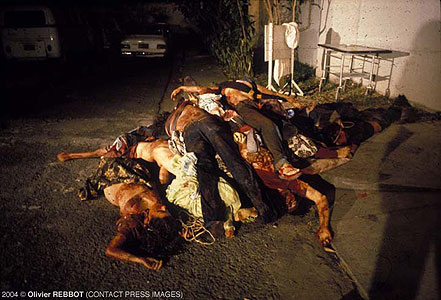
Death squad victims in San Salvador, 1981

D'Aubuisson involved himself in death squad activity while in the military, and he became associated with the second death squad to emerge in El Salvador in the mid-1970s, called the White Warriors Union. In October 1979, after a group of progressive officers deposed the government of Carlos Humberto Romero in a bloodless coup d'état and established the Revolutionary Government Junta (JRG, 1979–1982), D'Aubuisson was forced out of military service for his death squad connections, although he continued working for senior military commanders secretly. D'Aubuisson was regularly featured on Salvadoran television denouncing alleged traitors and communists, who were then murdered shortly afterwards by death squads.

On 7 May 1980, six weeks after the assassination of Óscar Romero, D'Aubuisson and a group of civilians and soldiers were arrested on a farm. The raiders found weapons and documents identifying D'Aubuisson and the civilians as death squad organizers and financiers, and of planning a coup d'état to depose the JRG. D'Aubuisson was soon released from prison, after 8 of the 14 military garrison commanders voted for his release, overruling the JRG.

His opposition to the JRG gave him international infamy. In August 1981, The Washington Post reported that D'Aubuisson "openly talked of the need to kill 200,000 to 300,000 people to restore peace to El Salvador". Shortly afterwards, on September 30, he founded ARENA (Nationalist Republican Alliance), a far-right political party. D'Aubuisson accumulated much political capital among Salvadorans for his anti-leftist stridency and for his reputation as an effective counter-insurgency strategist. He often accused the JRG of being a Marxist threat to El Salvador.

D'Aubuisson was widely perceived as a neo-fascist by both contemporaries and historians. He praised Hitler to West German journalists, out of belief in the Jewish Bolshevism conspiracy: "You Germans were very intelligent. You realized that the Jews were responsible for the spread of Communism and you began to kill them." He also asked every Jesuit be murdered as instruments of Communism and threatened to kill James Richard Cheek, a State Department official under Carter.

== Political career ==
=== President of the Legislative Assembly ===
In the 1982 legislative election, the PDC won 40 percent of the vote but not a controlling majority in the legislature. Meanwhile, ARENA won 29 percent of the vote, the PCN won 19 percent, Democratic Action (AD) won 8 percent, and other parties won the remaining 4 percent. D'Aubuisson was among one of ARENA's 19 deputies in the Legislative Assembly. Representing the San Salvador Department, he assumed office on 26 April 1982.

Although ARENA and the PCN were held a majority and sought to elect D'Aubuisson as the country's president, pressure from the United States dissuaded the PCN which voted with the PDC to elect AD candidate Álvaro Magaña as the country's president. Rather than being elected as president of El Salvador, D'Aubuisson was instead elected as the president of the Legislative Assembly, serving from 26 April 1982 to 20 December 1983. The JRG's government ended on 2 May 1982

On 31 March 1983, D'Aubuisson was allowed entry to the United States by the State Department after deeming him not barred from entry any longer. When asked about D'Aubuisson's association with the assassination of Archbishop Romero, the State Department responded that "the allegations have not been substantiated." In November 1993, documents by the State Department, Defense Department, and the Central Intelligence Agency were released after pressure by Congress increased. The 12,000 documents revealed that the administrations of Ronald Reagan and George H. W. Bush knew of the assassinations conducted by D'Aubuisson, including that of Oscar Romero, and still worked with him despite this.

=== 1984 presidential campaign ===
On 25 March 1984, D'Aubuisson began his campaign for the Salvadoran presidency. On 2 May he lost the presidential election to former President of the Junta José Napoleón Duarte of the Christian Democratic Party, receiving 46.4 percent of the vote to Duarte's 53.6 percent. D'Aubuisson claimed fraud and U.S. interference on behalf of Duarte, who was later confirmed to have been a CIA asset. In Washington D.C., a supporter of D'Aubuisson was Senator Jesse Helms, who had close ties with D'Aubuisson's ARENA party.

Helms opposed the appointment of Thomas R. Pickering as Ambassador to El Salvador, and alleged that the CIA had interfered in the 1984 Salvadoran election in favor of Duarte, claiming that Pickering had "used the cloak of diplomacy to strangle freedom in the night". A CIA operative testifying to the Senate Intelligence Committee was alleged by Helms to have admitted rigging the election, but senators who attended stated that, whilst the CIA operative admitted involvement, the person did not admit to rigging the election. Helms disclosed details of CIA financial support for Duarte, earning a rebuke from fellow senator Barry Goldwater, but Helms replied that his information came from sources in El Salvador, not the Senate committee.

In December 1984, D'Aubuisson travelled to Washington and was presented with a plaque by groups such as the American Foreign Policy Council, the Moral Majority and the Young Americans for Freedom for “continuing efforts for freedom in the face of communist aggression which is an inspiration to freedom-loving people everywhere”.

=== Deputy of the Legislative Assembly ===
In 1985, D'Aubuisson was re-elected as a deputy of the Legislative Assembly from San Salvador. In 1988, he was re-elected as a deputy of the Legislative Assembly, but instead from La Libertad. In 1991, he was re-elected as a deputy of the Legislative Assembly, again from La Libertad.

== Death ==
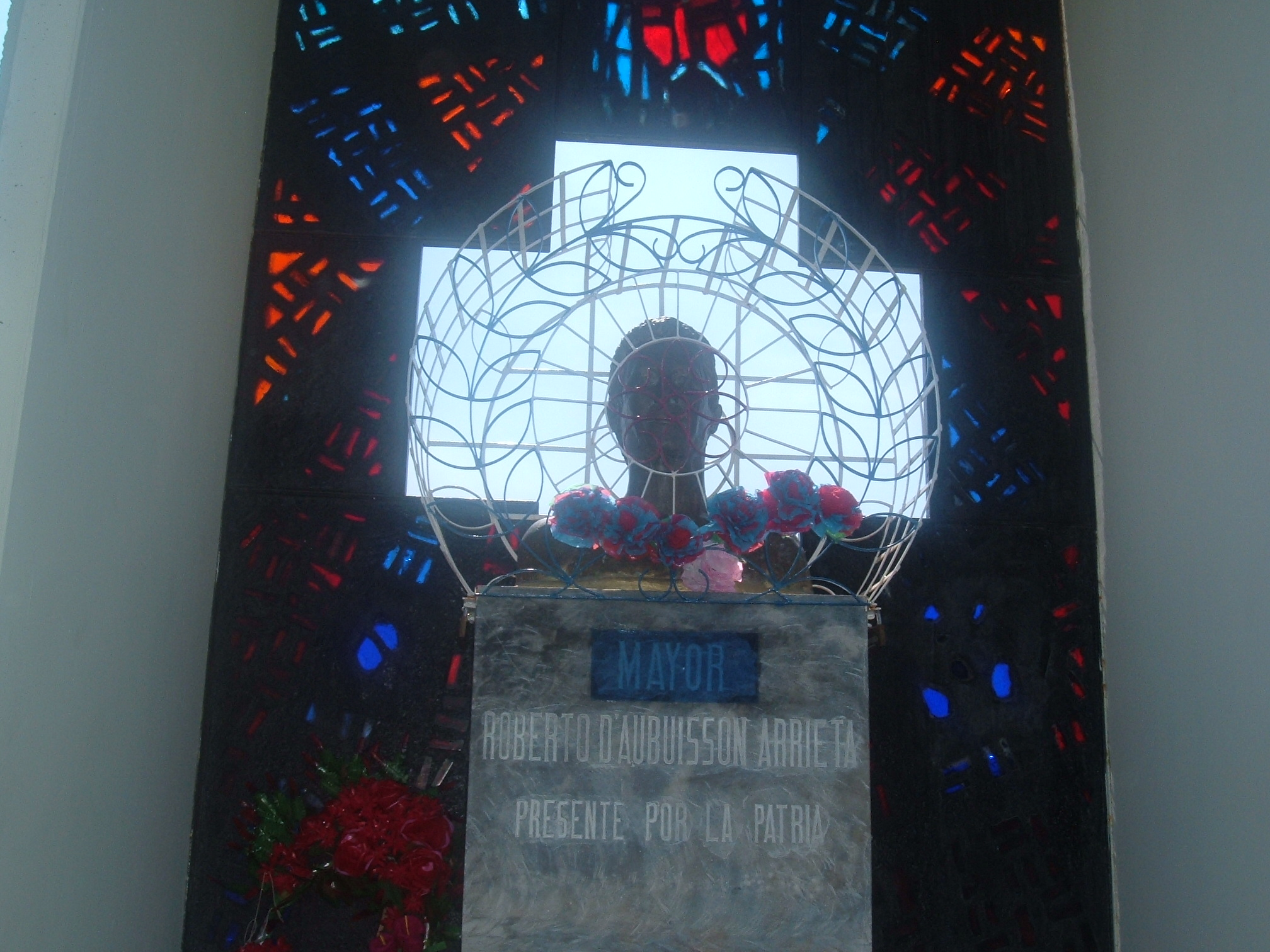
D'Aubuisson's grave

D'Aubuisson died at 48 after a prolonged battle against esophageal cancer and bleeding ulcers on 20 February 1992.

== Commission reports ==
After the Salvadoran Civil War, the United Nations Commission on the Truth for El Salvador and the Inter-American Commission on Human Rights stated that D'Aubuisson "gave the order to assassinate the Archbishop" to military officers who also tried to kill judge Atilio Ramírez Amaya "to deter investigation of the case". Views of him among contemporary Salvadorans are mixed and often drawn across party lines. ARENA supporters revere him for his right-wing beliefs and steadfast opposition to communism. FMLN supporters vilify him for his alleged human rights atrocities and involvement in Archbishop Romero's assassination.

On January 20, 2007, President Antonio Saca of the ARENA party paid homage to D'Aubuisson upon the anniversary of his death, promising "to continue the ARENA party, based upon his ideologic legacy." Amid opposition debate, ARENA tried to name D'Aubuisson a "meritorious son of El Salvador", a national honor, but failed due to the efforts of protesting Church leaders and human rights workers.

He was known as "Chele" (light-skinned face) and was alleged to have been a leader of anti-communist death squads that were alleged to have tortured and killed thousands of civilians before and during the Salvadoran Civil War. To political prisoners he was known as "Blowtorch Bob", due to his frequent use of a blowtorch in interrogation sessions.

In 1986, ex-U.S. ambassador Robert White reported to the United States Congress that "there was sufficient evidence" to convict D'Aubuisson of planning and ordering Archbishop Romero's assassination, describing D'Aubuisson as a pathological killer, as early as his 1984 Salvadoran presidential run. In April 2010, Alvaro Saravia, a former army captain who had admitted taking part in Romero's murder, testified in an interview with the Salvadoran newspaper El Faro that D'Aubuisson had given the order to proceed with the killing of the archbishop. The report of the U.N. truth commission in El Salvador following the Salvadoran Civil War found that D'Aubuisson was arrested on a farm following the assassination of the archbishop, along with weapons and documents tied to the assassination.

== Sons ==
In February 2007, D'Aubuisson's son Eduardo, along with two ARENA politicians and their driver, were killed in Guatemala. Investigators suggested that the murders may have been connected to drug-trafficking groups. In March 2015, D'Aubuisson's surviving son, Roberto José d'Aubuisson Munguía, was elected mayor of Santa Tecla, a neighboring municipality of the capital San Salvador.

== In popular culture ==
Tony Plana was cast as Maj. Maximiliano "Max" Casanova in the movie Salvador by Oliver Stone, a thinly disguised depiction of D'Aubuisson. In the 1989 film Romero, D'Aubuisson was depicted as Lt. Columa and played by Eddie Velez.

Political offices
Preceded by José Leandro Echeverría	President of the Legislative Assembly; 1982–1983	Succeeded by María Julia Castillo Rodas
