= Nationalist Democratic Organization =

1965–1979 Salvadoran paramilitary organization

- Organización Democrática Nacionalista

Agency overview
- Formed: 1965
- Dissolved: 1979
- Jurisdiction: El Salvador
- Headquarters: San Salvador, El Salvador
- Director responsible: José Alberto Medrano (1965-1977); Roberto Eulaio Santivanez (1977-1979)
- Parent agency: National Security Agency of El Salvador

The Nationalist Democratic Organization (Spanish: Organización Democrática Nacionalista, abbreviated ORDEN) was a Salvadoran paramilitary organization founded under the military rule of Julio Adalberto Rivera, headed by José Alberto Medrano. ORDEN helped control the 1972 elections, in which reform-minded José Napoleón Duarte lost to Arturo Armando Molina (of Rivera's party, the National Conciliation Party (PCN)) due to fraud.

== History ==
ORDEN was originally established in 1961 as a civil defense apparatus, composed of army reserve units and commandeered peasants. According to the Human Rights Institute of the Central American University, one of ORDEN's principal functions initially was to identify and eliminate purported communists among the rural population. Under Colonel Jose Alberto Medrano's command, ORDEN was transformed into a highly organized militia force, with military officers in command at the department level, non-commissioned officers coordinating actions from municipal centers, and many members drawn from army reservists and retired National Guard and Treasury Police officers. ORDEN functioned as the intelligence-gathering instrument of the Salvadoran armed forces (FAES) while also acting in anti-insurgent operations and helping in military recruitment. Its structure was composed of senior military officers directly responsible to the president, and it functioned as the brain of a security network that spanned the entire country, providing information and coordinating the activities of death squads.

In 1965, all of El Salvador's military, paramilitary, and other forces were synchronized under one system: ANSESAL, or Agencia Nacional de Seguridad Salvadoreña (National Security Agency of El Salvador). A 1983 report said that one in five people in El Salvador were informers for ANSESAL.

After 1967, its existence and function was made public and it served to strengthen the base of support for the PCN, which won all the elections between 1962 and 1969. The importance of ORDEN lay in its being an organization composed of peasants and farmers responsible for repressing their own class. In 1967, the paramilitary organization mobilized over 100,000 people. After the election of Fidel Sánchez Hernández, also in 1967, the president took control of ORDEN.

ORDEN penetrated every hamlet in the country and, according to Americas Watch, "is widely recognized as one of the precursors of the 'death squads' of the late 1970s and 1980s." During the 1970s ORDEN units frequently participated with the military and security forces in the torture and killing of unarmed government opponents, and was accused of engaging in widespread repression by both the U.S. State Department and the Organization of American States (OAS). The October 1978 Amnesty International report on El Salvador indicated that ORDEN functioned as a government goon squad to frighten local people, break up community meetings, intimidate voters and torture and murder peasants.

During the regime of Gen. Carlos Humberto Romero the government relied heavily on ORDEN to repress opposition in rural areas. The Inter-American Commission on Human Rights of the OAS issued a report which indicated that ORDEN was terrorizing peasants throughout the country as part of the military's overall policy of repression, and that ORDEN was involved in a number of extrajudicial killings and acts of torture. Moreover, a March 1980 report by Amnesty International to the Inter-American Commission contained seven pages of incidents in which the military, security forces or ORDEN were responsible for killing unarmed civilians. There were reports in the late 1970s of ORDEN and National Guard forces killing civilian opponents of the government with machetes, sometimes brutally hacking them to death and leaving them out in the open as a warning to other activists.

ORDEN was also implicated in voter intimidation during the 1972 and 1977 elections, playing a central role in reinforcing electoral fraud. Voting in El Salvador was obligatory for every citizen, and those who did not comply were subject to intimidation by security forces and armed political factions. ORDEN was heavily involved in coercing the civilian population into voting for General Romero in the February 1977 elections, reportedly using machetes to terrorize the general's opponents into submission and force citizens to vote for Romero. ORDEN also coordinated and directed repressive actions against the clergy. In just four months between February and May 1977, 17 priests were expelled or forced to flee the country, four imprisoned and tortured, and six killed. These actions were both coordinated and carried out by ORDEN.

In November 1979, ORDEN was officially decommissioned by the Revolutionary Government Junta of El Salvador as part of a program of human rights reform. However, with the escalation of civil tensions and the resignation of the last civilian members of the junta, the military unofficially reactivated ORDEN. ORDEN subsequently resumed its normal functions, as an intelligence gathering agency and a repressive apparatus, and continued to be a principal auxiliary to conventional forces in El Salvador.

On May 14, 1980, ORDEN participated with the National Guard and units of Military Detachment No. 1 in a large massacre at the Rio Sumpul, in which an estimated 600 civilians were killed, mostly women and children. When the villagers were attempting to escape violence by crossing the river they were prevented from reaching the other side by the Honduran armed forces "and then killed by Salvadorian troops who fired on them in cold blood." Peasants who survived the massacre later described to visiting foreign delegations of inquiry how Salvadoran soldiers and ORDEN members gathered children and babies together, threw them into the air and slashed them to death with machetes.

== See also ==
- Patrullas de Autodefensa Civil (PACs, or Civilian Self Defense Patrols): Guatemala
- Autodefensas Unidas de Colombia (AUC, or United Self-Defense Forces of Colombia): Colombia
- Grupos de Acción Anticomunista (GAA, or Anti-Communist Action Groups): Paraguay
