= 1982 Salvadoran Constitutional Assembly election =

- 28 March 1982
- All 60 seats in the Constitutional Assembly; 31 seats needed for a majority
Party	Leader	Vote %	Seats
PDC	José Napoleón Duarte	40.20	24
ARENA	Roberto D'Aubuisson	29.28	19
PCN		18.61	14
AD		7.68	2
PPS		3.06	1
This lists parties that won seats. See the complete results below.
Results by constituency

Constitutional Assembly elections were held in El Salvador on 28 March 1982. The Christian Democratic Party won a plurality, with 24 of the 60 seats. Voter turnout was 68.0%. A coalition government, representing the three largest parties equally, was subsequently formed under the presidency of Álvaro Magaña.

== Results ==
Party	Votes	%	Seats
Christian Democratic Party	590,644	40.20	24
Nationalist Republican Alliance	430,205	29.28	19
National Conciliation Party	273,383	18.61	14
Democratic Action	112,787	7.68	2
Salvadoran Popular Party	44,900	3.06	1
Popular Orientation Party	17,378	1.18	0
Total	1,469,297	100.00	60
Valid votes	1,469,297	88.49	
Invalid/blank votes	191,096	11.51	
Total votes	1,660,393	100.00	
Registered voters/turnout	2,440,000	68.05	
Source: Nohlen
