= Álvaro Magaña =

President of El Salvador from 1982 to 1984

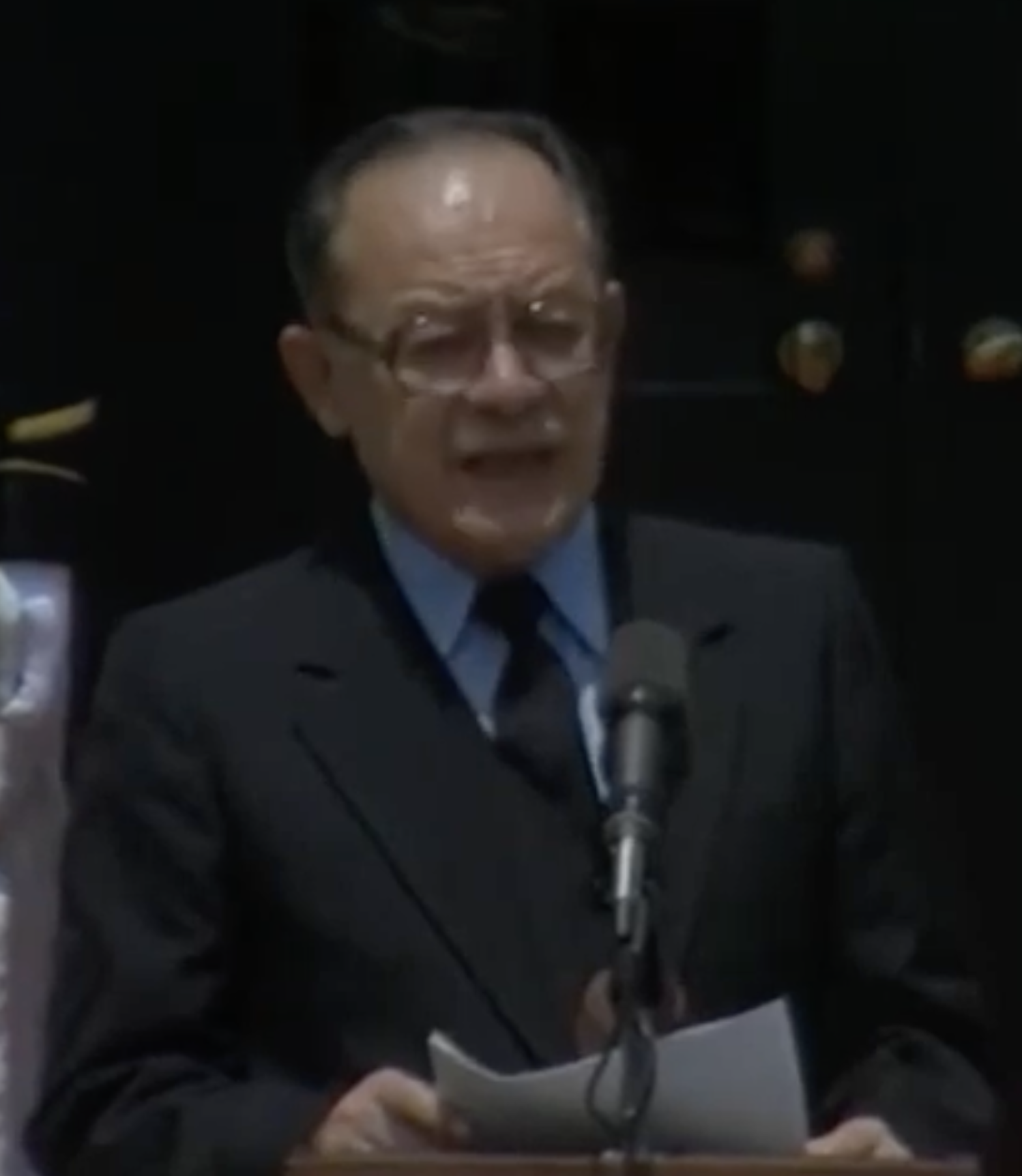
- Magaña in 1983

35th President of El Salvador
- In office 2 May 1982 – 1 June 1984; Provisional President
- Vice President: Raúl Molina Martínez; Mauricio Gutiérrez Castro; Pablo Mauricio Alvergue
- Preceded by: José Napoleón Duarte as president of the Revolutionary Government Junta
- Succeeded by: José Napoleón Duarte

Personal details
- Born: Álvaro Alfredo Magaña Borja; 8 October 1925 Ahuachapán, El Salvador
- Died: 10 July 2001 (aged 75) San Salvador, El Salvador
- Party: Democratic Action Party
- Spouse: Concha Marina de Magaña
- Occupation: Politician, lawyer, economist

Álvaro Alfredo Magaña Borja (8 October 1925 – 10 July 2001) was a Salvadoran politician, lawyer, and economist who was the 35th president of El Salvador from 1982 to 1984.

== Biography ==
He was born to a wealthy family in Ahuachapán, El Salvador, before his family moved to San Salvador when he was 10. He studied law at the University of El Salvador before going on to receive his master's degree in economics from the University of Chicago. He ran for president a first time in the 1967 election. He was president of the largest mortgage bank of El Salvador (Banco Hipotecario) before the 1982 election. He was sworn in by the President of the Constituent Assembly Roberto D'Aubuisson.

His inauguration as president on May 2, 1982, marked the beginning of elected government in El Salvador after the junta of 1979–1982.

In 1982, the Salvadoran political parties decided that it was time to move on from the rule of the Revolutionary Government Junta (JRG) and decided to install Magaña as head of state.

Soon afterward, both political parties met at Magaña's farm in Apaneca and decided that under Magaña's provisional government, both parties would share in the ministerial posts.

José Napoleón Duarte willingly relinquished his power as head of state and head of the Junta to Magaña briefly and instead focused on building up his own Christian Democratic Party with the help of the United States and planned to take back power in the 1984 elections.

He died in San Salvador on 10 July 2001.

Political offices
Preceded by Revolutionary Government Junta	President of El Salvador; 1982–1984	Succeeded by José Napoleón Duarte
