= Rubén Alonso Rosales =

Salvadoran politician (1925–2000)

Major Rubén Alonso Rosales
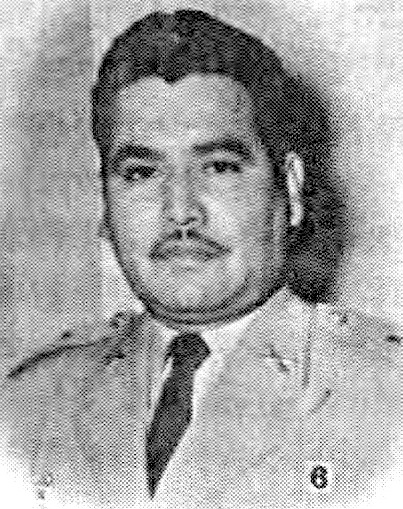
- Born: 11 January 1925; Paraíso de Osorio, El Salvador
- Died: 13 May 2000 (aged 75); Reseda, Los Angeles, California, U.S.
- Spouse: María Garay
- Relatives: Vicente Soriano Rosales (father), María Soriano Rosales (mother)
- Military career
- Allegiance: El Salvador
- Branch: Salvadoran Army
- Service years: 1941–1961
- Rank: Major
- Conflicts: Majors' Coup; 1960 Salvadoran coup d'état 1961 Salvadoran coup d'état

Rubén Alonso Rosales (11 January 1925 – 13 May 2000) was a Salvadoran politician who was a member of the six-man junta government that took control of El Salvador as a result of the peaceful coup in 1960.

== Early life ==
Born in the village of Paraíso de Osorio, La Paz department, El Salvador, to Vicente and María Soriano Rosales as the third child of seven. Despite his father's effort to have his male children help on the farm, his mother, a school teacher, insisted that all their children obtain an education and made all efforts to ensure that they received at least a high school education, having to send all children to a larger town, Cojutepeque, to achieve that. Showing interest in entering the military at the age of fifteen, his parents worked hard to enroll him into the country's military academy.

== Service in the military ==
On 2 February 1941, he joined the academy as one of 124 recruits. However, by July, his parents could no longer afford his tuition, but his stay at the academy was assured when he received one of the two scholarships granted to the recruits. Around Rubén's first year at the academy, he was befriended by Colonel Óscar Osorio, who was the sub-director of the academy and would later be a member of the Revolutionary Council governing the country (1948–1950) and eventually President of the Republic (1950–1956).

On 2 April 1944, while on military leave working the family farm, a rebellion to overthrow President Maximiliano Hernández Martínez broke out, he reported to the Cojutepeque garrison for duty and was one of two cadets from the entire academy who saw military action against the rebellion. Later that year, he was introduced to a cadet recruit's sister, María Garay, daughter of Colonel Eduardo Garay, who would become his wife three years later. They would have four children. In July 1945, he and twelve others from the original 124 graduated as commissioned officers. He was assigned to the artillery regiment known as El Zapote (now a military museum) in the nation's capital, across from the Presidential House.

On 14 December 1948, being the commander on duty at the strategic location across the Presidential house for that day, he was enlisted to participate in a rebellion to overthrow President Salvador Castaneda Castro. The rebellion proved successful and brought an old friend, Colonel Óscar Osorio, into a governing position in the country.

From February 1950 to February 1953, he was one of two Salvadorean officers to receive a scholarship from the Mexican government to attend the Escuela Superior de Guerra in Mexico City. Upon his return to El Salvador, he served in the Military Academy but eventually returned to El Zapote as the third in command. By this time, the artillery regiment had become the most elite of the armed forces in the nation. In 1957–1958, as a delegate of the Armed Forces, he joined the entourage of President José María Lemus in many of his official trips throughout Latin America. In 1958, he was promoted to second in command of El Zapote. Major Arturo Armando Molina, who later became President of the Republic (1972–1977) was his replacement as third in command.

In 1960, in large part due to the strategic position of the elite regiment across the Presidential House, he was enlisted to play a part in the overthrow of President José María Lemus. Coronel Óscar Osorio was instrumental in the planning of the overthrow. Upon the successful overthrow, Major Rosales was named one of the six-man government that took control of the country. The junta ruled from October 26, 1960, to January 25, 1961, when it was subsequently overthrown by another coup and replaced by the Civic-Military Directory.

== Post-Military ==
Sent into exile, Rubén Alonso Rosales ended up in Mexico, where he had befriended many military officers from the Mexican Army a decade earlier, who assisted him for a few months. Returning to El Salvador at the end of 1961, he was allowed to stay in the country, but the government in power, suspecting that he was fomenting a rebellion, strongly recommended that he leave the country for his safety. The Salvadoran government arranged his immigration to the United States in September 1962. Rubén Alonso Rosales settled in the Los Angeles area, he became one of Jehovah's Witnesses in August 1969, and he worked for a furniture moving company until 1985, when he retired.

Rosales died from a heart attack in Reseda, Los Angeles, on 13 May 2000, at the age of 75.

== Sources ==
- Time magazine - November 7, 1960
- Political Leaders of El Salvador
- Good Government—Will It Ever Be Realized?
