= Valiente =

Valiente may refer to:

- Valiente (surname), a surname
- Valiente (wrestler), a Mexican wrestler
- Valiente Peak, a mountain of Antarctica
- Valiente (1992 TV series), a Philippine television series
- Valiente (2012 TV series), a Philippine television series
- Valiente (album), a 2018 album by Thalía
- "Valiente", 1987 song by Pimpinela

== See also ==
- Corazón Valiente, an American telenovela
- Principe Valiente, a Swedish musical group
