= 1961 Salvadoran coup d'état =

Overthrow of the Junta of Government

Date	25 January 1961
Location	El Salvador
Result	Counter-coup successful: Formation of anti-Communist military junta; Outlawing of communist parties

Belligerents
(El Salvador) Junta of Government	(El Salvador) Armed Forces (rebels)

Commanders and leaders
César Yanes Urías	Aníbal Portillo

The 1961 Salvadoran coup d'état was a successful countercoup in El Salvador led by Colonel Aníbal Portillo against the short-lived Junta of Government that had taken power in 1960, replacing the reformist military junta with an ardent anti-communist government named the Civic-Military Directory. By the end of that year, military governance had given way to democratic rule.

Motives behind the military overthrow were reactionary in nature, driven by military fears of a Communist takeover within the country, due to the perceived sympathies of the reformist junta towards Communist and Cuban influence. These concerns were further exacerbated by the visit to Cuba by far-left Salvadoran extremists, spurring the disunited Armed Forces to unify in safeguarding the state from Communism.

On 25 January 1961, the planned military coup, which had the backing of every top army official, was finally executed, ending in the successful deposing of the six-man civilian-military junta. The avowedly anti-communist Civic-Military Directory that succeeded them permitted the continued activity of all non-Communist political parties ahead of planned congressional elections. Meanwhile, Communist parties were outlawed. The new government promised early elections, social and agrarian reforms, along with close cooperation with the United States. The US promptly extended diplomatic recognition to the military junta on February 15.

Fulfilling their promise to return the country to constitutional government, constituent assembly elections were held in December. On 5 January 1962, the newly drafted constitution was approved by the Constituent Assembly. Three days later on 8 January, a provisional president was elected: Eusebio Rodolfo Cordón Cea.
