= List of longest-living state leaders =

This article lists the 100 oldest heads of state or heads of government of sovereign states, often presidents or prime ministers, since the early modern period onwards. This list includes those who were or are leaders over a sovereign and internationally recognized state. States with limited recognition are not included (exceptions being for states considered independent in their own right, including members of the Warsaw Pact (Note: For states since the United Nations was formed, having significant international recognition by the international community or being an Observer state is enough for entering the main list. For states prior to the United Nations Security Council Resolution 109 on 14 December 1955 and during the League of Nations' era, recognition by at least one widely recognised state is enough for entry.)). Leaders who do not have any reliable source about their death currently or have been alive according to a source more than 10 years old are not included in the list. The longest-lived verifiable state leader is Chau Sen Cocsal Chhum of Cambodia at the age of 103 years, 143 days. Muhammad al-Muqri of Morocco is the only state leader who could have lived longer, possibly to the age of 103 years, 219 days, while the status of state leader of César Yanes Urías of El Salvador and Josip Manolić of Croatia, who have lived to the ages of 104 years, 224 days and 104 years, 24 days respectively, is unclear. Leaders who are currently living are in bold and green, with Guillermo Rodríguez of Ecuador being the longest-living of those at the age of 103 years, 18 days.

== Gallery ==
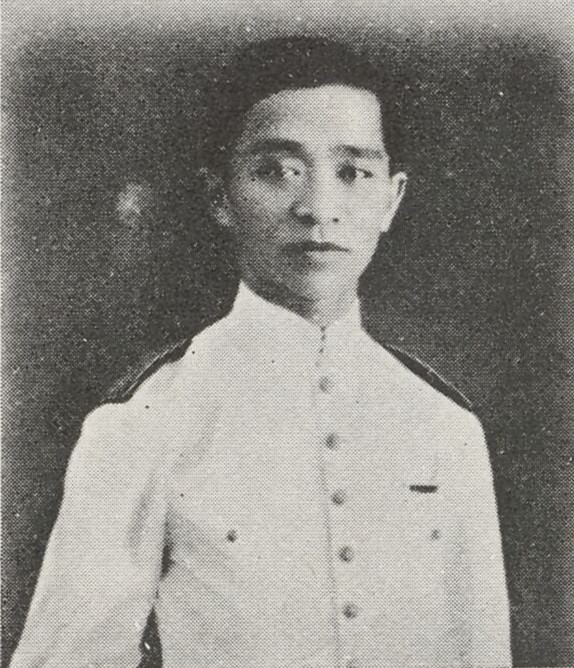
Longest-living:
**Chau Sen Cocsal Chhum**
Cambodia
1962

2nd‑longest living:
**Celâl Bayar**
Turkey
1937–1939 and 1950–1960

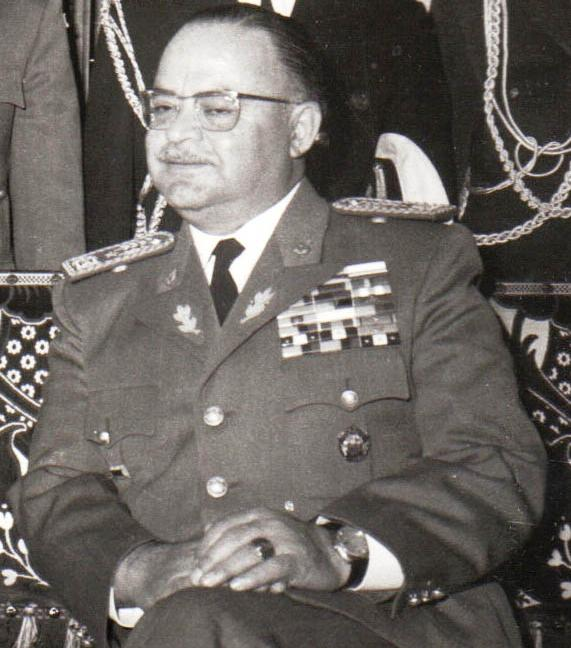
Longest currently living and 3rd‑longest living:
**Guillermo Rodríguez**
Ecuador
1972–1976

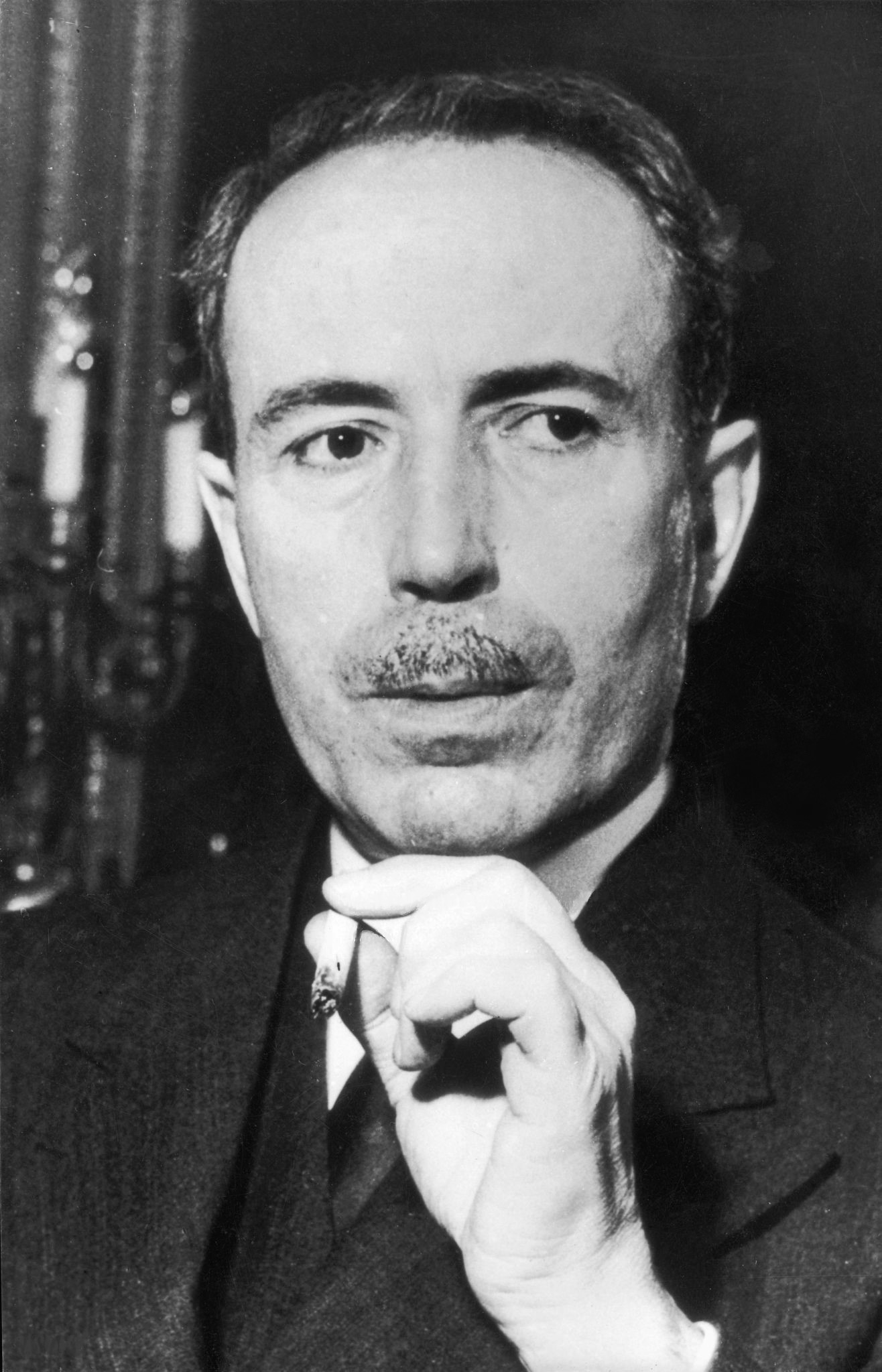
4th‑longest living:
**Antoine Pinay**
France
1952–1953

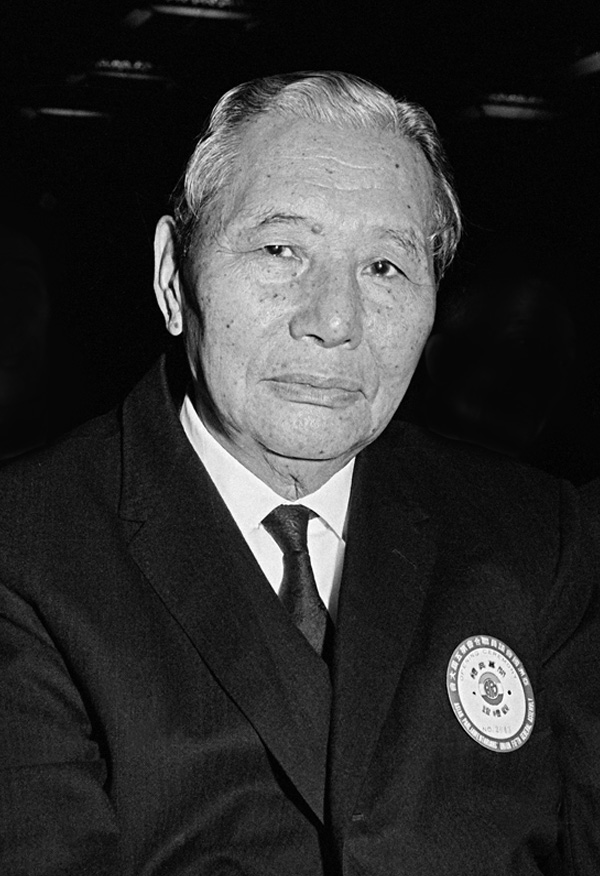
Longest-living of a now-defunct state and 10th‑longest living:
**Zhang Qun**
China
1947–1948

== List ==
Currently living

| No. | Name | State | Position | Birth | Death | Age | Citation |
|---|---|---|---|---|---|---|---|
| 1 | Chau Sen Cocsal Chhum | Cambodia | Acting Prime Minister (1962) | 1 Sep 1905 | 22 Jan 2009 | 103 years, 143 days | |
| 2 | Celâl Bayar | Turkey | Prime Minister (1937–1939); President (1950–1960) | 16 May 1883 | 22 Aug 1986 | 103 years, 98 days | |
| **3** | **Guillermo Rodríguez** | **Ecuador** | Acting President (1972–1976) | **4 Nov 1923** | **Alive** | **103 years, 18 days** | |
| 4 | Antoine Pinay | France | Prime Minister (1952–1953) | 30 Dec 1891 | 13 Dec 1994 | 102 years, 348 days | |
| 5 | Prince Naruhiko Higashikuni | Japan | Prime Minister (1945) | 3 Dec 1887 | 20 Jan 1990 | 102 years, 48 days | |
| 6 | Babiker Awadalla | Sudan | Acting Prime Minister (1969) | 2 Mar 1917 | 17 Jan 2019 | 101 years, 321 days | |
| 7 | Willem Drees | Netherlands | Prime Minister (1948–1958) | 5 Jul 1886 | 14 May 1988 | 101 years, 314 days | |
| 8 | Đỗ Mười | Vietnam | Chairman of the Council of Ministers (1988–1991); General Secretary of the Communist Party (1991–1997) | 2 Feb 1917 | 1 Oct 2018 | 101 years, 241 days | |
| 9 | Tomiichi Murayama | Japan | Prime Minister (1994–1996) | 3 Mar 1924 | 17 Oct 2025 | 101 years, 228 days | |
| 10 | Zhang Qun | China | Premier (1947–1948) | 9 May 1889 | 14 Dec 1990 | 101 years, 219 days | |
| 11 | Yasuhiro Nakasone | Japan | Prime Minister (1982–1987) | 27 May 1918 | 29 Nov 2019 | 101 years, 186 days | |
| **12** | **Mahathir Mohamad** | **Malaysia** | Prime Minister (1981–2003; 2018–2020) | **10 Jul 1925** | **Alive** | **101 years, 135 days** | |
| **13** | **Mohammad Hasan Sharq** | **Afghanistan** | Chairman of the Council of Ministers (1988–1989) | **17 Jul 1925** | **Alive** | **101 years, 128 days** | |
| 14 | Piet de Jong | Netherlands | Prime Minister (1967–1971) | 3 Apr 1915 | 27 Jul 2016 | 101 years, 115 days | |
| 15 | Hyun Soong-jong | South Korea | Prime Minister (1992–1993) | 26 Feb 1919 | 25 May 2020 | 101 years, 89 days | |
| 16 | Bernardino González Ruiz | Panama | Acting President (1963) | 11 Jan 1911 | 15 Mar 2012 | 101 years, 64 days | |
| 17 | Khamtai Siphandone | Laos | Prime Minister (1991–1998); Chairman of the People's Revolutionary Party (1992–2006); President (1998–2006) | 8 Feb 1924 | 2 Apr 2025 | 101 years, 53 days | |
| 18 | Christopher Hornsrud | Norway | Prime Minister (1928) | 15 Nov 1859 | 12 Dec 1960 | 101 years, 27 days | |
| 19 | Vassos Lyssarides | Cyprus | Acting President (1989; 2002) | 13 May 1920 | 26 Apr 2021 | 100 years, 348 days | |
| 20 | Mustafa Ben Halim | Libya | Prime Minister (1954–1957) | 29 Jan 1921 | 7 Dec 2021 | 100 years, 312 days | |
| 21 | Telmo Vargas | Ecuador | Chief of Staff of the Armed Forces (1966) (Note: This position was the de facto Acting Military President of Ecuador.) | 9 Oct 1912 | 9 Aug 2013 | 100 years, 304 days | |
| 22 | Francisco Morales Bermúdez | Peru | Prime Minister (1975); President (1975–1980) | 4 Oct 1921 | 14 Jul 2022 | 100 years, 283 days | |
| **23** | **Abdoulaye Wade** | **Senegal** | President (2000–2012) | **29 May 1926** | **Alive** | **100 years, 177 days** | |
| 24 | Luis Echeverría | Mexico | President (1970–1976) | 17 Jan 1922 | 8 Jul 2022 | 100 years, 172 days | |
| 25 | Jimmy Carter | United States | President (1977–1981) | 1 Oct 1924 | 29 Dec 2024 | 100 years, 89 days | |
| 26 | Xenophon Zolotas | Greece | Interim Prime Minister (1989–1990) | 26 Mar 1904 | 10 Jun 2004 | 100 years, 76 days | |
| 27 | Javier Pérez de Cuéllar | Peru | Prime Minister (2000–2001) | 19 Jan 1920 | 4 Mar 2020 | 100 years, 45 days | |
| 28 | Abdul Salam Sabrah | North Yemen | Acting Prime Minister (1969; 1971; 1971) | 1 Jan 1912 | 2 Feb 2012 | 100 years, 32 days | |
| **29** | **Valdas Adamkus** | **Lithuania** | President (1998–2003; 2004–2009) | **3 Nov 1926** | **Alive** | **100 years, 19 days** | |
| 30 | Raif Dizdarević | Yugoslavia | President of the Presidency (1988–1989) | 9 Dec 1926 | 2 Sep 2026 | 99 years, 267 days | |
| 31 | Johan Ferrier | Suriname | President (1975–1980) | 12 May 1910 | 4 Jan 2010 | 99 years, 237 days | |
| 32 | Tun Tin | Burma | Prime Minister (1988) | 2 Oct 1920 | 1 May 2020 | 99 years, 212 days | |
| 33 | Gulzarilal Nanda | India | Acting Prime Minister (1964; 1966) | 4 Jul 1898 | 15 Jan 1998 | 99 years, 195 days | |
| 34 | Mohammed Karim Lamrani | Morocco | Prime Minister (1971–1972; 1983–1986; 1992–1994) | 1 May 1919 | 20 Sep 2018 | 99 years, 142 days | |
| 35 | Anthony Mamo | Malta | Governor-General (1971–1974); President (1974–1976) | 9 Jan 1909 | 1 May 2008 | 99 years, 113 days | |
| 36 | Michail Stasinopoulos | Greece | President (1974–1975) | 27 Jul 1903 | 31 Oct 2002 | 99 years, 96 days | |
| 37 | Clifford Campbell | Jamaica | Governor-General (1962–1973) | 28 Jun 1892 | 28 Sep 1991 | 99 years, 92 days | |
| 38 | Morarji Desai | India | Prime Minister (1977–1979) | 29 Feb 1896 | 10 Apr 1995 | 99 years, 41 days | |
| 39 | Võ Chí Công | Vietnam | Chairman of the Council of State (1987–1992) | 7 Aug 1912 | 8 Sep 2011 | 99 years, 32 days | |
| 40 | Ċensu Tabone | Malta | President (1989–1994) | 30 Mar 1913 | 14 Mar 2012 | 98 years, 350 days | |
| 41 | Ali Hassan Mwinyi | Tanzania | President (1985–1995); Chairman of the Chama Cha Mapinduzi (1990–1995); (Note: Mwinyi ruled as chairman until 1996, however it ceased to be the ruling party after his presidency ended in 1995.) | 8 May 1925 | 29 Feb 2024 | 98 years, 297 days | |
| 42 | Prem Tinsulanonda | Thailand | Prime Minister (1980–1988); Regent (2016) | 26 Aug 1920 | 26 May 2019 | 98 years, 273 days | |
| 43 | Pierre Harmel | Belgium | Prime Minister (1965–1966) | 16 Mar 1911 | 15 Nov 2009 | 98 years, 244 days | |
| 44 | Howard Cooke | Jamaica | Governor-General (1991–2006) | 13 Nov 1915 | 11 Jul 2014 | 98 years, 240 days | |
| 45 | Joseph Paul-Boncour | France | Prime Minister (1932–1933) | 4 Aug 1873 | 28 Mar 1972 | 98 years, 237 days | |
| 46 | Konstantinos Mitsotakis | Greece | Prime Minister (1990–1993) | 18 Oct 1918 | 29 May 2017 | 98 years, 223 days | |
| 47 | Isidro Ayora | Ecuador | President (1926–1931) (Note: He was interim President until 1929.) | 31 Aug 1879 | 22 Mar 1978 | 98 years, 203 days | |
| 48 | Émile Reuter | Luxembourg | Prime Minister (1918–1925) | 2 Aug 1874 | 14 Feb 1973 | 98 years, 196 days | |
| **49** | **Arthur Foulkes** | **Bahamas** | Governor-General (2010–2014) | **11 May 1928** | **Alive** | **98 years, 195 days** | |
| 50 | Mamadou Dia | Senegal | Prime Minister (1957–1962) | 18 Jul 1910 | 25 Jan 2009 | 98 years, 191 days | |
| 51 | Aden Adde | Somalia | President (1960–1967) | 9 Dec 1908 | 8 Jun 2007 | 98 years, 181 days | |
| 52 | Lê Đức Anh | Vietnam | President (1992–1997) | 1 Dec 1920 | 22 Apr 2019 | 98 years, 142 days | |
| 53 | Émile Derlin Zinsou | Dahomey | President (1968–1969) | 23 Mar 1918 | 28 Jul 2016 | 98 years, 127 days | |
| 54 | Lubomír Štrougal | Czechoslovakia | Prime Minister (1970–1988) | 19 Oct 1924 | 6 Feb 2023 | 98 years, 110 days | |
| 55 | Jean | Luxembourg | Regent (1961–1964); Grand Duke (1964–2000) | 5 Jan 1921 | 23 Apr 2019 | 98 years, 108 days | |
| 56 | Gough Whitlam | Australia | Prime Minister (1972–1975) | 11 Jul 1916 | 21 Oct 2014 | 98 years, 102 days | |
| **57** | **Péter Boross** | **Hungary** | Prime Minister (1993–1994) | **27 Aug 1928** | **Alive** | **98 years, 87 days** | |
| 58 | Giorgio Napolitano | Italy | President (2006–2015) | 29 Jun 1925 | 22 Sep 2023 | 98 years, 85 days | |
| 59 | Venceslau Brás | Brazil | President (1914–1918) | 26 Feb 1868 | 15 May 1966 | 98 years, 78 days | |
| 60 | Ramaswamy Venkataraman | India | President (1987–1992) | 4 Dec 1910 | 27 Jan 2009 | 98 years, 54 days | |
| 61 | Gabriel París Gordillo | Colombia | Chairman of the Military Junta of Government (1957–1958) (Note: This position was the de facto Acting Military President of Colombia.) | 8 Mar 1910 | 21 Mar 2008 | 98 years, 13 days | |
| 62 | Miloš Jakeš | Czechoslovakia | De facto ruler of the ČSSR as First Secretary of the KSČ (1987–1989) | 12 Aug 1922 | 10 Jul 2020 | 97 years, 333 days | |
| 63 | Thanin Kraivichien | Thailand | Prime Minister (1976–1977) | 5 Apr 1927 | 23 Feb 2025 | 97 years, 324 days | |
| 64 | Abdelsalam Majali | Jordan | Prime Minister (1993–1995; 1997–1998) | 18 Feb 1925 | 3 Jan 2023 | 97 years, 319 days | |
| 65 | Kenan Evren | Turkey | President (1982–1989) | 17 Jul 1917 | 9 May 2015 | 97 years, 296 days | |
| 66 | Zhu Rongji | China | Premier of the State Council (1998–2003) | 23 Oct 1928 | 12 Aug 2026 | 97 years, 293 days | |
| 67 | Wellington Koo | China | Acting President (1926–1927); Acting Premier (1924; 1926–1927) | 29 Jan 1888 | 14 Nov 1985 | 97 years, 289 days | |
| 68 | Baron Ignaz von Plener | Austria-Hungary | Minister-President (1870) | 21 May 1810 | 17 Feb 1908 | 97 years, 272 days | |
| 68 | Kim Yong-nam | North Korea | President of the Presidium (1998–2019) | 4 Feb 1928 | 3 Nov 2025 | 97 years, 272 days | |
| 70 | Domhnall Ua Buachalla | Irish Free State | Governor-General (1932–1936) | 3 Feb 1866 | 30 Oct 1963 | 97 years, 269 days | |
| 71 | Abdelmalek Benhabyles | Algeria | Acting President (1992) (Note: Chairman of the Constitutional Council from 1989; Became Acting President on 11 January 1992 after state President Chadli Bendjedid was ousted.) | 27 Apr 1921 | 28 Dec 2018 | 97 years, 245 days | |
| 72 | Arnaldo Forlani | Italy | Prime Minister (1980–1981) | 8 Dec 1925 | 6 Jul 2023 | 97 years, 210 days | |
| 73 | Ramón José Velásquez | Venezuela | President (1993–1994) | 28 Nov 1916 | 24 Jun 2014 | 97 years, 208 days | |
| 74 | He Yingqin | China | Premier (1949) | 2 Apr 1890 | 21 Oct 1987 | 97 years, 202 days | |
| 75 | Liam Cosgrave | Ireland | Taoiseach (1973–1977) | 13 Apr 1920 | 4 Oct 2017 | 97 years, 174 days | |
| 76 | Alfredo Solf y Muro | Peru | Prime Minister (1939–1944) | 15 Mar 1872 | 14 Aug 1969 | 97 years, 152 days | |
| 77 | Patricio Aylwin | Chile | President (1990–1994) | 26 Nov 1918 | 19 Apr 2016 | 97 years, 145 days | |
| 78 | Armando Villanueva | Peru | Prime Minister (1988–1989) | 25 Nov 1915 | 14 Apr 2013 | 97 years, 140 days | |
| 79 | Ion Gheorghe Maurer | Romania | President of the Council of Ministers (1961–1974) | 23 Sep 1902 | 8 Feb 2000 | 97 years, 138 days | |
| **80** | **Orville Turnquest** | **Bahamas** | Governor-General (1995–2001) | **19 Jul 1929** | **Alive** | **97 years, 126 days** | |
| 81 | Martial Célestin | Haiti | Prime Minister (1988) | 4 Oct 1913 | 4 Feb 2011 | 97 years, 123 days | |
| 82 | Édouard Balladur | France | Prime Minister (1993–1995) | 2 May 1929 | 31 Aug 2026 | 97 years, 121 days | |
| 83 | Gheorghe Apostol | Romania | General Secretary of the Romanian Communist Party (1954–1955) | 16 May 1913 | 21 Aug 2010 | 97 years, 97 days | |
| 84 | Pierre-Antoine Lalloy | France | President of the National Convention (1792) | 16 Jan 1749 | 16 Mar 1846 | 97 years, 59 days | |
| 85 | Kenneth Kaunda | Zambia | President (1964–1991) (Note: Kaunda was also the Prime Minister of Northern Rhodesia, a British protectorate, in 1964.) | 28 Apr 1924 | 17 Jun 2021 | 97 years, 50 days | |
| 86 | Giovanni Paolo Lascaris | Knights Hospitaller | Grand Master of the Knights Hospitaller (1636–1657) | 28 Jun 1560 | 14 Aug 1657 | 97 years, 47 days | |
| 86 | Walter Scheel | West Germany | Acting Chancellor (1974); President (1974–1979) | 8 Jul 1919 | 24 Aug 2016 | 97 years, 47 days | |
| **88** | **Michael J. Williams** | **Trinidad and Tobago** | Acting President (1987) | **16 Oct 1929** | **Alive** | **97 years, 37 days** | |
| **89** | **Gombojavyn Ochirbat** | **Mongolia** | De facto leader of the MPR as General Secretary of the MPRP (1990) | **15 Nov 1929** | **Alive** | **97 years, 7 days** | |
| **90** | **Alfred Moisiu** | **Albania** | President (2002–2007) | **1 Dec 1929** | **Alive** | **96 years, 356 days** | |
| **91** | **Lee Hyun-jae** | **South Korea** | Prime Minister (1988) | **20 Dec 1929** | **Alive** | **96 years, 337 days** | |
| **92** | **Ahmed Osman** | **Morocco** | Prime Minister (1972–1979) | **3 Jan 1930** | **Alive** | **96 years, 323 days** | |
| 93 | Helmut Schmidt | West Germany | Chancellor (1974–1982) | 23 Dec 1918 | 10 Nov 2015 | 96 years, 322 days | |
| 94 | Gennaro Granito Pignatelli di Belmonte | Vatican City | Dean of the College of Cardinals during vacancy (1939) | 10 Apr 1851 | 16 Feb 1948 | 96 years, 312 days | |
| 95 | Khertek Anchimaa-Toka | Tuva | Chairwoman of the Presidium (1940–1944) | 1 Jan 1912 | 4 Nov 2008 | 96 years, 308 days | |
| 96 | Nguyễn Văn Xuân | South Vietnam | Chief of Provisional Central Government (1948–1949) | 3 Apr 1892 | 14 Jan 1989 | 96 years, 286 days | |
| 97 | Milan Panić | Yugoslavia | Federal Prime Minister (1992–1993) | 20 Dec 1929 | 24 Sep 2026 | 96 years, 278 days | |
| 98 | Camille Huysmans | Belgium | Prime Minister (1946–1947) | 26 May 1871 | 25 Feb 1968 | 96 years, 275 days | |
| 99 | Yitzhak Shamir | Israel | Prime Minister (1983–1984; 1986–1992) | 22 Oct 1915 | 30 Jun 2012 | 96 years, 252 days | |
| 100 | Habib Bourguiba | Tunisia | Prime Minister (1956–1957); President (1957–1987) | 3 Aug 1903 | 6 Apr 2000 | 96 years, 247 days | |

== Addendum ==
Currently living

=== Uncertain date of birth/death ===
The following individuals might have been older than #1–100 on the main list above, but their exact date of birth/death is uncertain.
| Name | State | Position | Birth | Death | Age | Citation |
|---|---|---|---|---|---|---|
| Muhammad al-Muqri | Morocco | Grand vizier (1911–1913; 1917–1955) | 2 Feb 1854 or 2 Feb 1860 (Note: Muhammad al-Muqri's birthdate is disputed, but he is generally agreed to have been born in either 1854 or 1860.) | 9 Sep 1957 | 103 years, 219 days or; 97 years, 219 days | |
| Ek Yi Oun | Cambodia | Prime Minister (1958) | 1910 | Jan 2013 | 102 years, 1 day to; 103 years, 30 days | |
| Ghalib bin Ali | Imamate of Oman | Imam (1954–1959) | 1908 or 1912 | 29 Nov 2009 | 100 years, 333 days to; 101 years, 332 days or; 96 years, 333 days to; 97 years, 332 days | |
| Hastings Banda | Malawi | Prime Minister (1964–1966); President (1966–1994) | ca. 1896–1898 (Note: Hastings Banda's birthdate is disputed, but he is generally agreed to have been born between 1896 and 1898, though some sources suggest 1906.) | 25 Nov 1997 | 98 years, 329 days to; 101 years, 328 days | |
| Sheikh Mukhtar Mohamed Hussein | Somalia | Acting President (1969) | before Jun 1912 | 12 Jun 2012 | 100 years, 0 days to; 100 years, 163 days; (Note: Sheikh Mukhtar Mohamed Hussein's birthdate is uncertain, but it is known he was 100 when he died and that he was born in 1912.) | |
| Wan Li | China | Acting Premier as Vice Premier (1982–1983; 1985) | Dec 1916 | 15 Jul 2015 | 98 years, 196 days to; 98 years, 226 days | |
| Abdul Momin | Brunei | Sultan (1852–1885) | before May 1788 | 29 May 1885 | 97 years, 0 days to 97 years, 148 days (Note: Abdul Momin's birthdate is uncertain, but it is known he was 97 when he died and that he was born in 1788.) | |
| Federico Páez | Ecuador | President (1935–1937) | 6 Jun 1876 or 4 Jun 1877 | 9 Feb 1974 | 97 years, 248 days or 96 years, 250 days | |
| Jorge Vega Rodríguez | Costa Rica | Acting President (1968) | 8 Jun 1904 | Mar 2001 | 96 years, 266 days to; 96 years, 296 days | |
| Konstantinos Kollias | Greece | Prime Minister (1967) | 1901 | 13 Jul 1998 | 96 years, 194 days to; 97 years, 193 days | |

=== Unclear status as state leaders ===
The following individuals lived longer than #1–75 on the main list above, but their status as a state leader is unclear. (Note: They were either members of collective presidencies without a clear leader, interim leaders, de facto leaders, widely recognised leaders whose true power was limited or leaders of political entities whose status as sovereign states was unclear or disputed.)
| Name | State | Position | Birth | Death | Age | Citation |
|---|---|---|---|---|---|---|
| César Yanes Urías | El Salvador | Member of the Junta of Government (1960–1961) | 24 Apr 1920 | 4 Dec 2024 | 104 years, 224 days | |
| Josip Manolić | Croatia | Prime Minister (1991) | 22 Mar 1920 | 15 Apr 2024 | 104 years, 24 days | |
| Kazi Lhendup Dorjee | Sikkim | Prime Minister (1974–1975) | 11 Oct 1904 | 28 Jul 2007 | 102 years, 290 days | |
| André Prunet-Foch | Andorra (Note: Andorra was not recognised by the UN until 28 July 1993.) | French Viguier (1977–1980) | 3 Jul 1914 | 30 Jan 2017 | 102 years, 211 days | |
| Edward Bernard Raczyński | Poland | Member of the Council of Three (1954–1972); President in-exile (1979–1986) | 19 Dec 1891 | 30 Jul 1993 | 101 years, 223 days | |
| Kim Yong-ju | North Korea | Vice president during vacancy (1994–1998) | 21 Sep 1920 | 13 Dec 2021 | 101 years, 83 days | |
| Hau Pei-tsun | Taiwan | President of the Executive Yuan (1990–1993) | 8 Aug 1919 | 30 Mar 2020 | 100 years, 235 days | |
| Ali Haroun | Algeria | Member of the High Council of State (1992–1994) | 8 Feb 1927 | 24 Oct 2026 | 99 years, 258 days | |
| Abdel Halim Mohamed | Sudan | Member of Sovereignty Council (1964–1965) | 10 Apr 1910 | 16 Apr 2009 | 99 years, 6 days | |
| Ivan Kedryn-Rudnytskyi | Ukraine | Chairman of the Council of People's Ministers in-exile (1976–1978) | 22 Apr 1896 | 4 Mar 1995 | 98 years, 316 days | |
| Matthew Ridgway | Japan | Supreme Commander for the Allied Powers (1951–1952) | 3 Mar 1895 | 26 Jul 1993 | 98 years, 145 days | |
| Borys Martos | Ukraine | Chairman of the Council of People's Ministers (1919) | 20 May 1879 | 19 Sep 1977 | 98 years, 122 days | |
| Artúr Görgei | Hungarian State | Governor-President (1849) | 30 Jan 1818 | 21 May 1916 | 98 years, 112 days | |
| Claude Rostain | Andorra | French Viguier (1972–1977) | 16 Dec 1916 | 10 Feb 2015 | 98 years, 56 days | |
| Dezső Pattantyús-Ábrahám | Hungary | Prime Minister of the Counter-Revolutionary Government (1919) | 10 Jul 1875 | 25 Jul 1973 | 98 years, 15 days | |
| Sawai Tej Singh Naruka | Alwar | Raja during Independence from British Raj (1947–1948) | 17 Mar 1911 | 15 Feb 2009 | 97 years, 335 days | |
| **Laurie Greig** | **Cook Islands** | Acting Queen's Representative (2000–2001) | **24 Feb 1929** | **Alive** | **97 years, 271 days** | |
| Abraham Gijsbertus Verster | Batavian Republic | Chairman of the National Assembly (1797) | 31 Jan 1751 | 7 Oct 1848 | 97 years, 250 days | |
| Janak Singh | Jammu and Kashmir | Prime Minister (1947) | 5 Aug 1872 | 15 Mar 1970 | 97 years, 222 days | |
| Francesc Badia i Batalla | Andorra | Episcopal Viguier (1972–1993) | 10 Jan 1923 | 14 Aug 2020 | 97 years, 217 days | |
| Lee Teng-hui | Taiwan | President (1988–2000) | 15 Jan 1923 | 30 Jul 2020 | 97 years, 197 days | |

=== Unclear status as state leaders with uncertain date of birth/death ===
The following individuals might have been older than #19–82 on the main list above, but their exact date of birth/death is uncertain and their status as a state leader is unclear. (Note: Sreenivasan was ruling Gwalior during its brief independence from the British Raj, meaning his state as a sovereign state leader was disputed and unclear. Hammuda was ruler of Palestine before it became a widely recognised state, meaning his status as a sovereign state leader was disputed and unclear.)
| Name | State | Position | Birth | Death | Age | Citation |
|---|---|---|---|---|---|---|
| M. A. Sreenivasan | Gwalior | Dewan during Independence from British Raj (1947–1948) | 1897 | 15 Jan 1998 | 100 years, 15 days to; 101 years, 14 days | |
| Yahya Hammuda | Palestine | Chairman of the Palestine Liberation Organization (1967–1969) | Mar 1909 | 16 Jun 2006 | 97 years, 77 days to 97 years, 107 days | |

== See also ==
- List of oldest living state leaders
- List of centenarians (politicians and civil servants)
- List of current heads of state and government
- List of current state leaders by date of assumption of office
- List of longest-reigning monarchs
- List of youngest state leaders since 1900
- List of state leaders by age
- Lists of state leaders
- Records of heads of state
- Gerontocracy
