= Records of heads of state =

Heads of state throughout the world and at all periods of history may be ranked according to characteristics such as length of time holding that position; age of accession or death; or physical attributes. World records in these characteristics may be identified, though the historical basis for such claims is frequently uncertain.

== Period of service ==
=== Longest serving ===
==== Monarchical ====
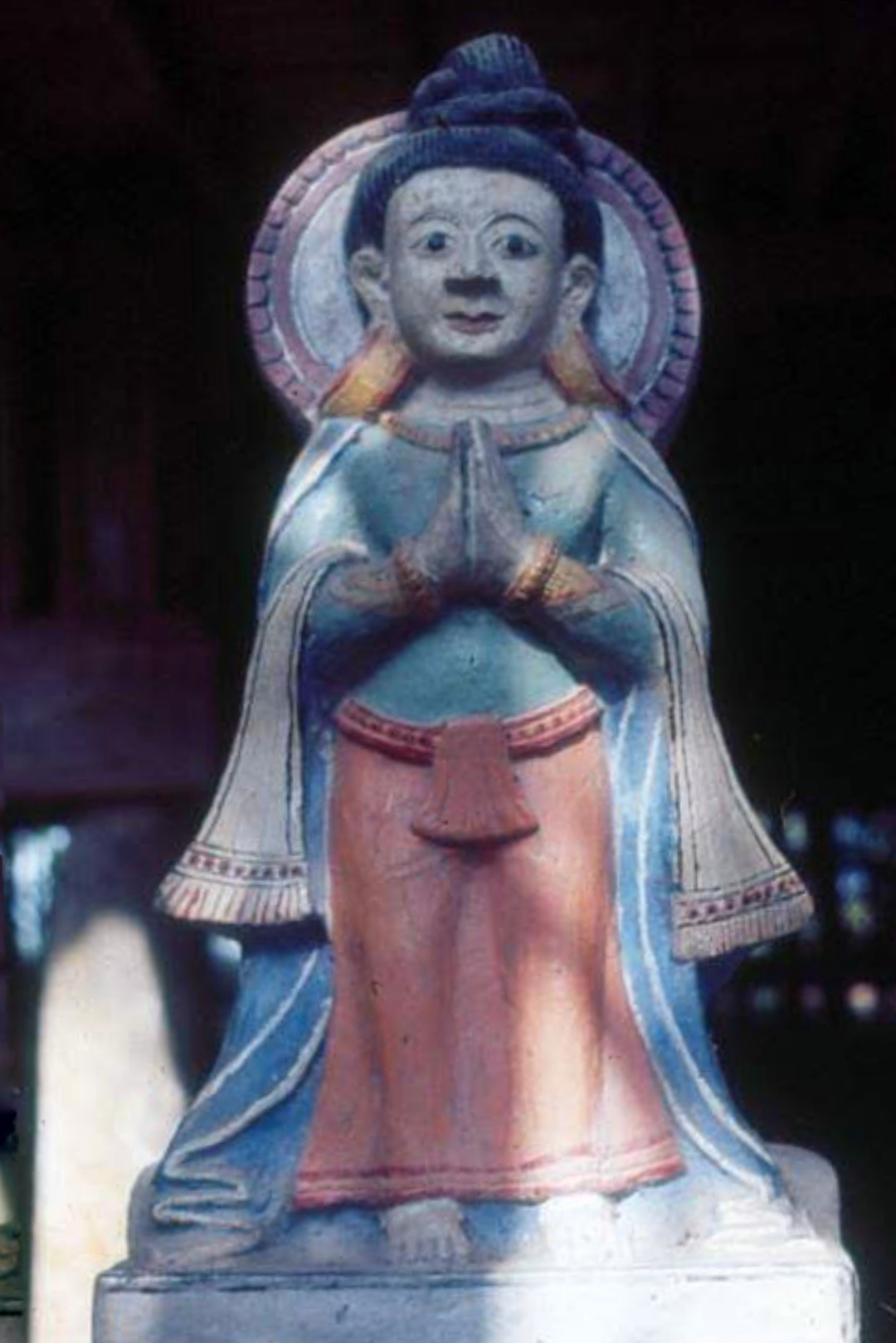
Min Hti, the longest-reigning claimed monarch

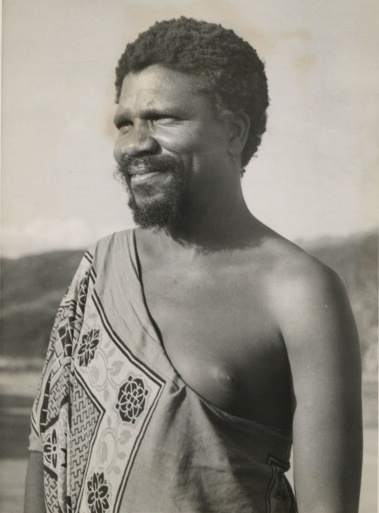
Sobhuza II, the longest-reigning verifiable monarch

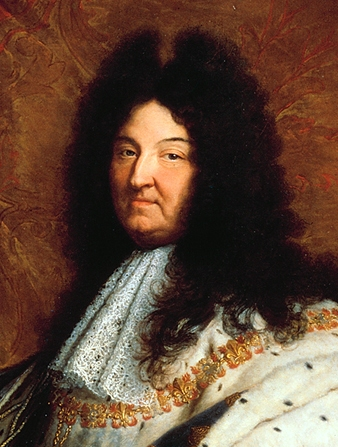
Louis XIV, the longest-reigning verifiable sovereign monarch

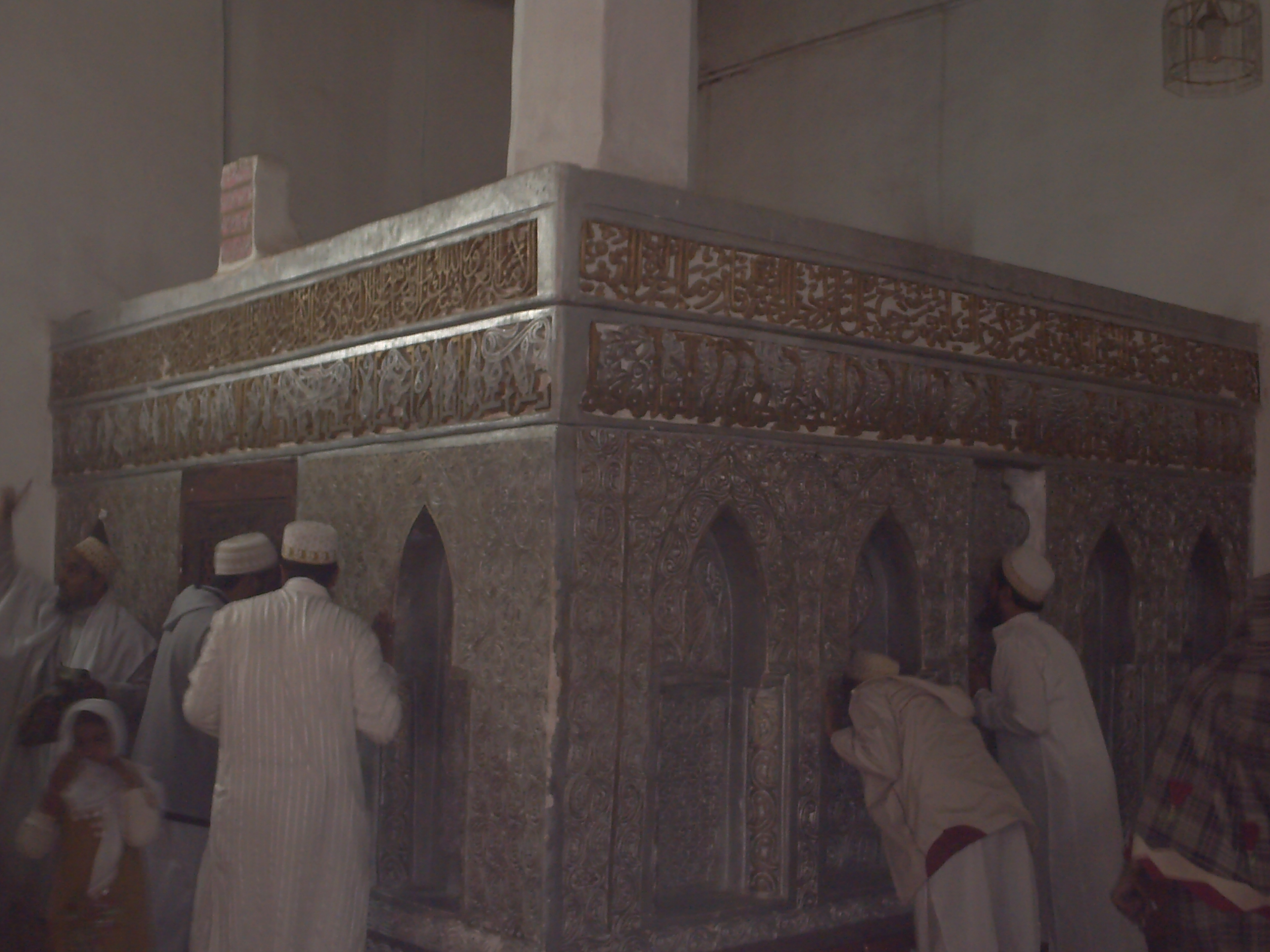
Arwa al-Sulayhi, the longest-reigning claimed female monarch

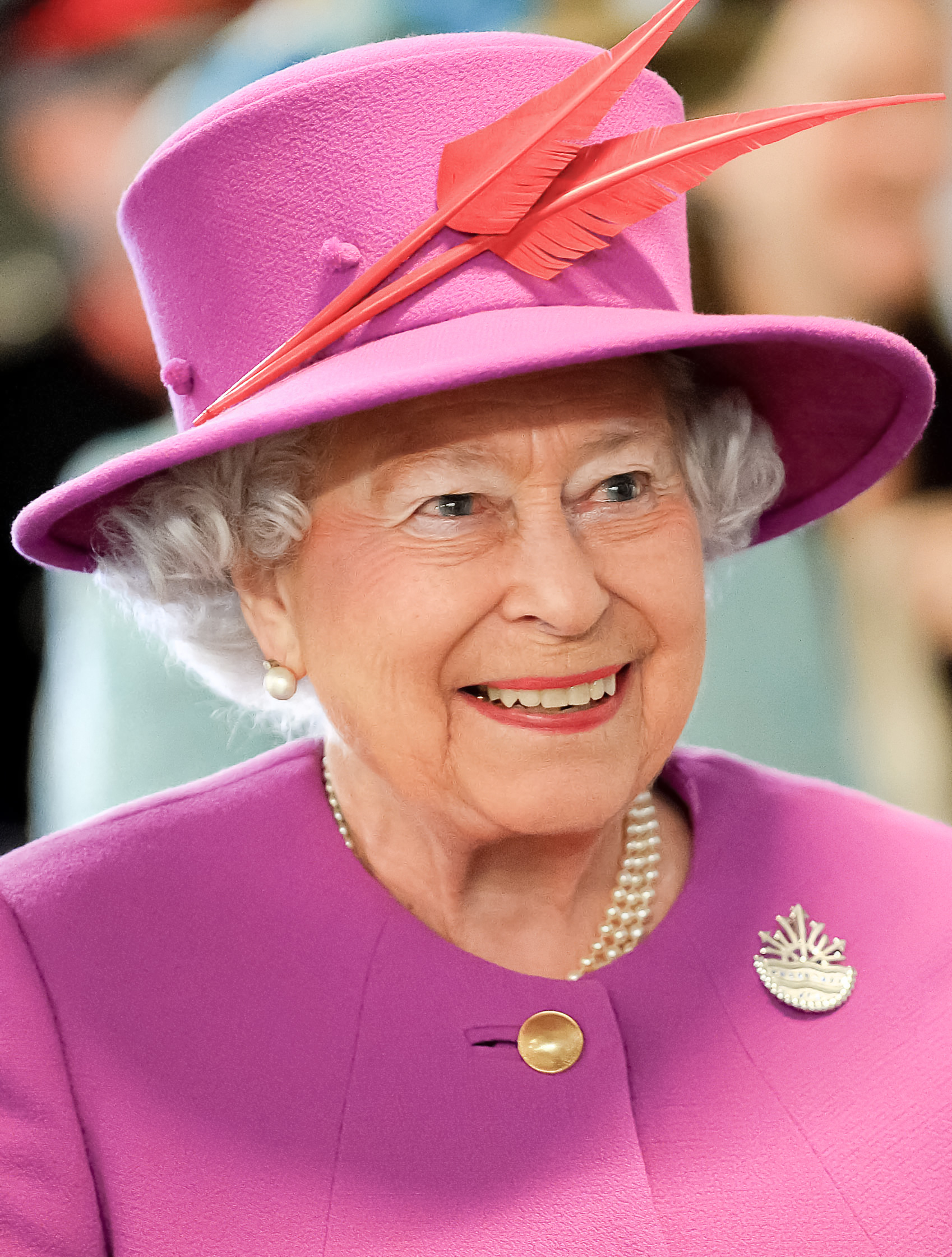
Elizabeth II, the longest-reigning verifiable female monarch

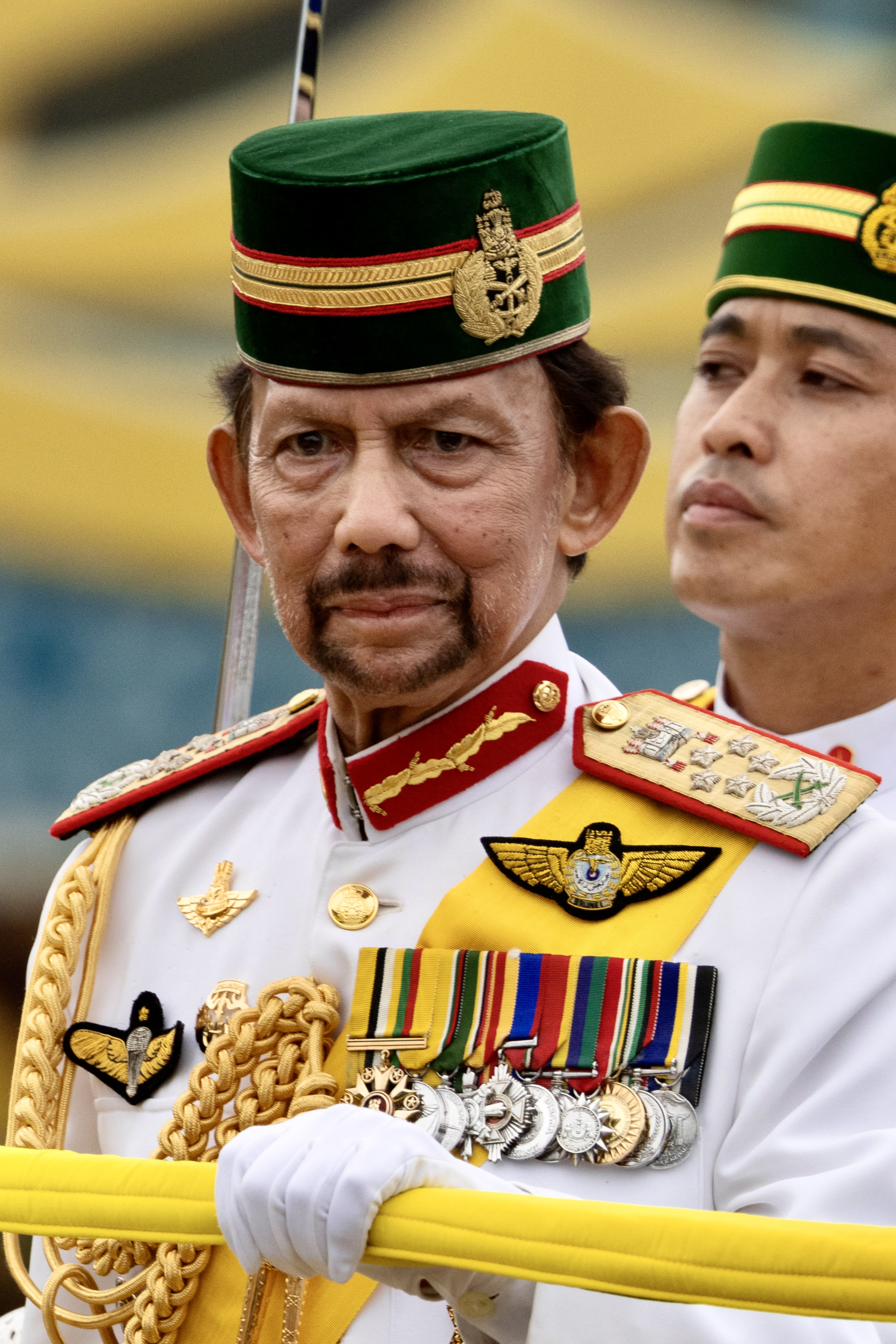
Hassanal Bolkiah, the longest currently reigning monarch

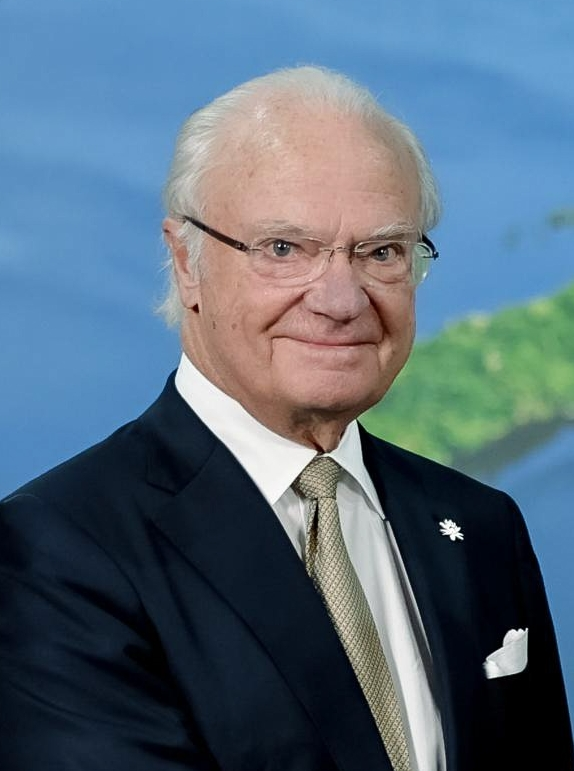
Carl XVI Gustaf, the longest currently reigning sovereign monarch

===== Longest-reigning male monarch =====
The longest undisputed reigning monarch is Sobhuza II, who ruled the Kingdom of Swaziland under the title of Paramount Chief of Swaziland and later king of Swaziland. He ruled for 82 years and 254 days. However, the longest undisputed reigning ruler of a sovereign state is Louis XIV, who ruled the king of France for 72 years and 110 days.

The distinction of longest-ruling monarch whose exact dates of rule are unknown is disputed between the following candidates:

- Min Hti of Arakan, who ruled the Kingdom of Arakan under the title of King of Arakan. He is believed to have ruled for either 95 (1279 – 1374) or 75 (1295 – 1370) years.
- Pepi II Neferkare, who ruled the Kingdom of Egypt under the title of Pharaoh. He is believed to have ruled for either 94 (2278 – 2184 BC) or 64 (2278 – 2214 BC) years.
- Taejodae of Goguryeo, who ruled Goguryeo under the title of Taewang ("the greatest of all kings"). He is believed to have ruled for either 93 (53 – 146 CE) or 68 years (53 – 121 CE).
- Abd al-Muttalib, who was the Lord of Quraysh in present-day Saudi Arabia, reportedly reigned for 81 years.
- Japanese legendary emperors, according to the ancient Japanese calendar, reigned for very long terms of 60–70 years each. The longest of these reigns was that of Emperor Kōan, who was claimed to have reigned for about 101 years.

These figures are not included in the list because they are regarded as inaccurate by modern scholars. For those, see Longevity myths.

===== Longest-reigning female monarch =====
The longest reigning claimed female monarch is Arwa al-Sulayhi, who reportedly ruled over the Sulayhid dynasty in present-day Yemen for about 71 years between 1067 and 5 May 1138. Her state was a confederation of the Fatimid Caliphate.

The longest reigning undisputed female monarch and longest reigning female monarch of a sovereign state is Elizabeth II, who reigned as Queen of the United Kingdom, Canada, Australia and New Zealand (Note: Elizabeth II reigned over 11 other sovereign states at the time of her death, however they were not independent at the time of her accession.) for 70 years and 214 days, from 6 February 1952 to 8 September 2022.

===== Longest-reigning current monarch =====
The longest currently reigning monarch is Hassanal Bolkiah, who is the Sultan and Yang di-Pertuan ("(he) who is Lord") of Brunei. He has ruled for 59 years and 39 days (since 5 October 1967). At the time of his accession, Brunei was a British protectorate; it did not transition to an independent sovereign state until 1 January 1984.

The longest currently reigning monarch of a sovereign state is Carl XVI Gustaf, who has reigned as King of Sweden for 53 years and 59 days (since 15 September 1973).

===== Longest current reigning female monarch =====
The longest currently reigning female monarch is Ntfombi, who has reigned as Queen Mother of Eswatini for 43 years and 95 days (since 10 August 1983). She previously ruled as queen regent until her son Mswati III's coronation in 1986, after which she has reigned alongside him as co-monarch. Ntfombi is also the only currently reigning female monarch, following the abdication of Margrethe II of Denmark since 14 January 2024.

==== Non-monarchical ====
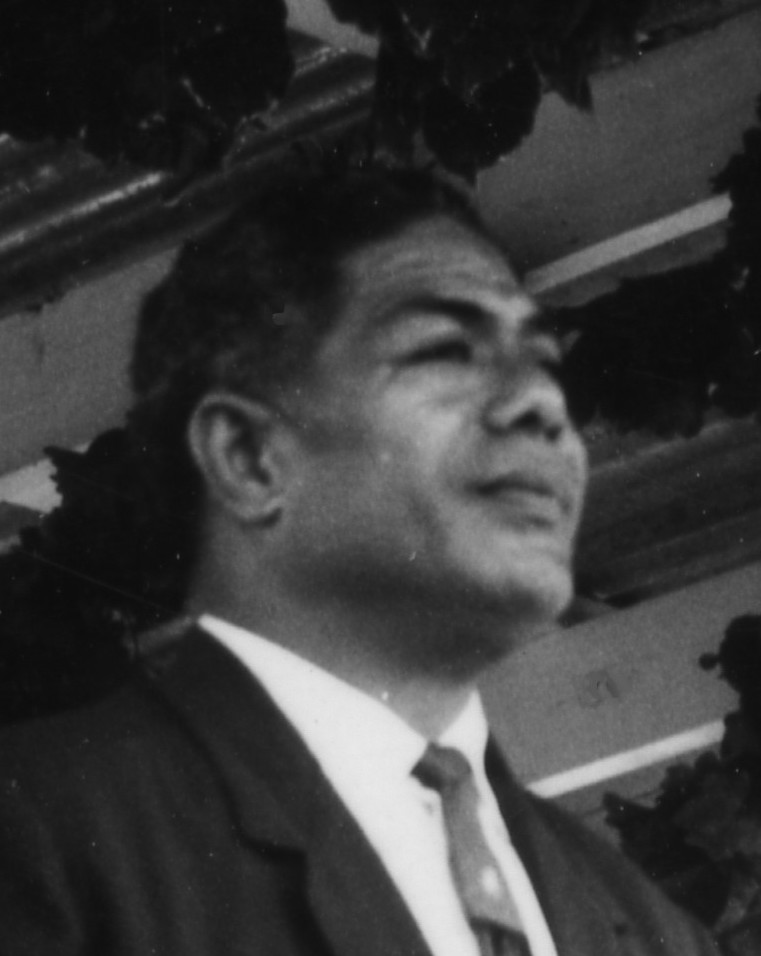
Malietoa Tanumafili II, the longest-serving male president

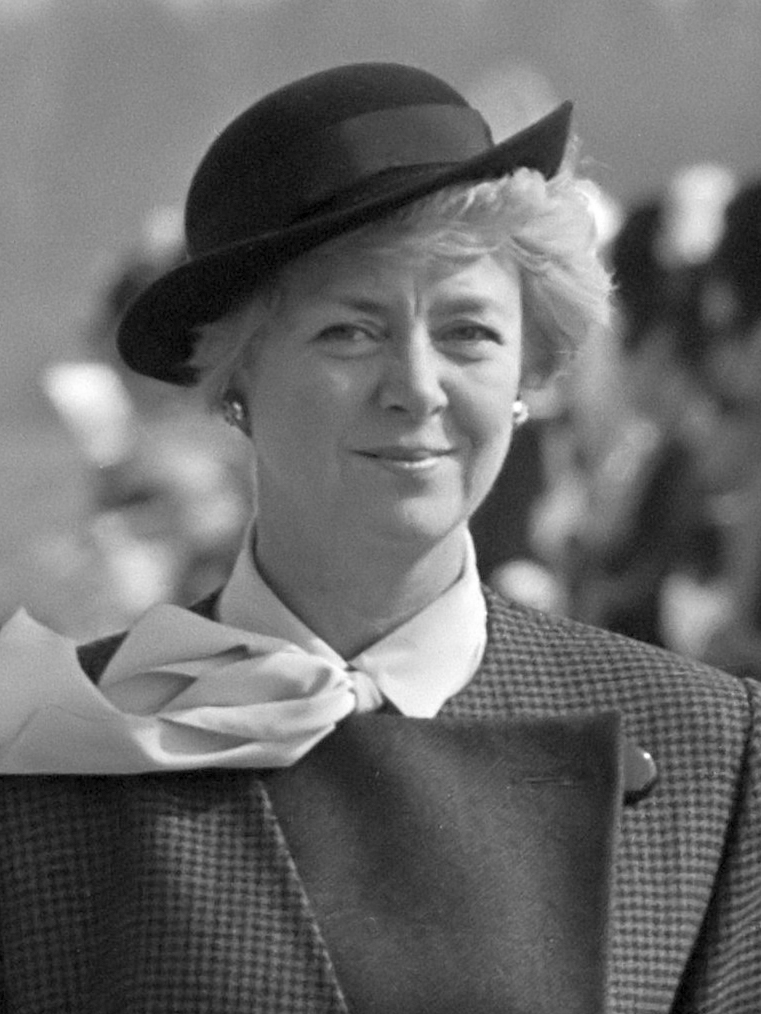
Vigdís Finnbogadóttir, the longest-serving female president

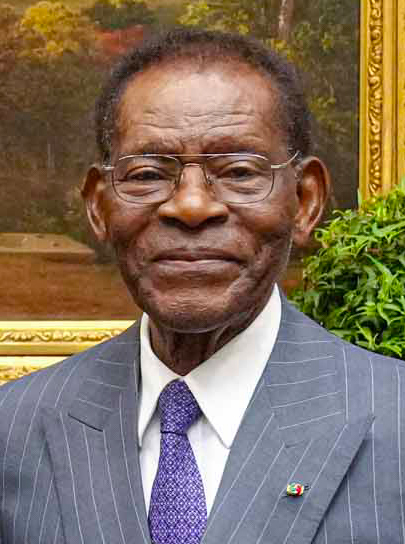
Teodoro Obiang Nguema Mbasogo, the longest-serving incumbent president

===== Longest-serving non-royal leader =====
The longest-serving non-royal leader is Fidel Castro of Cuba, who held the titles of prime minister of Cuba and First Secretary of the Communist Party of Cuba for a cumulative total of 52 years and 62 days. In addition to these titles, he served as head of state in his capacity as president of Cuba for 31 years and 84 days.

===== Longest-serving male president =====
The longest-serving male president is Teodoro Obiang Nguema Mbasogo of Equatorial Guinea, who has been the president of the country for 44 years since 1982.

The longest serving male president on a true democracy (not an authoritarian, one-party or dominant-party regime) was Dawda Jawara of The Gambia, who served for 24 years from 1970 to 1994.

The longest-serving male on a president-like office was Malietoa Tanumafili II of Samoa, who was O le Ao o le Malo for a special lifetime term (in derogation from the normal term length of 5 years) lasting 45 years and 130 days. However, despite the office of O le Ao o le Malo being equivalent to a president of a republic, he was also one of Samoa's four paramount chiefs.

===== Longest-serving female president =====
The longest-serving female president is Vigdís Finnbogadóttir, who was elected president of Iceland for 4 four-year terms, serving a total of 16 years.

===== Longest current serving male president =====
The longest current serving male president is Teodoro Obiang Nguema Mbasogo of Equatorial Guinea, who has served since 1982 for a total of 44 years and 32 days, after previously leading a military junta which seized power in 1979.

===== Longest current serving female president =====
The distinction of longest current serving female president is disputed between the following candidates:

- Salomé Zourabichvili, elected president of Georgia in 2018. Her position as president is disputed with Mikheil Kavelashvili as a result of the Georgian political crisis.
- Maia Sandu, elected president of Moldova in 2020.

=== Shortest serving ===
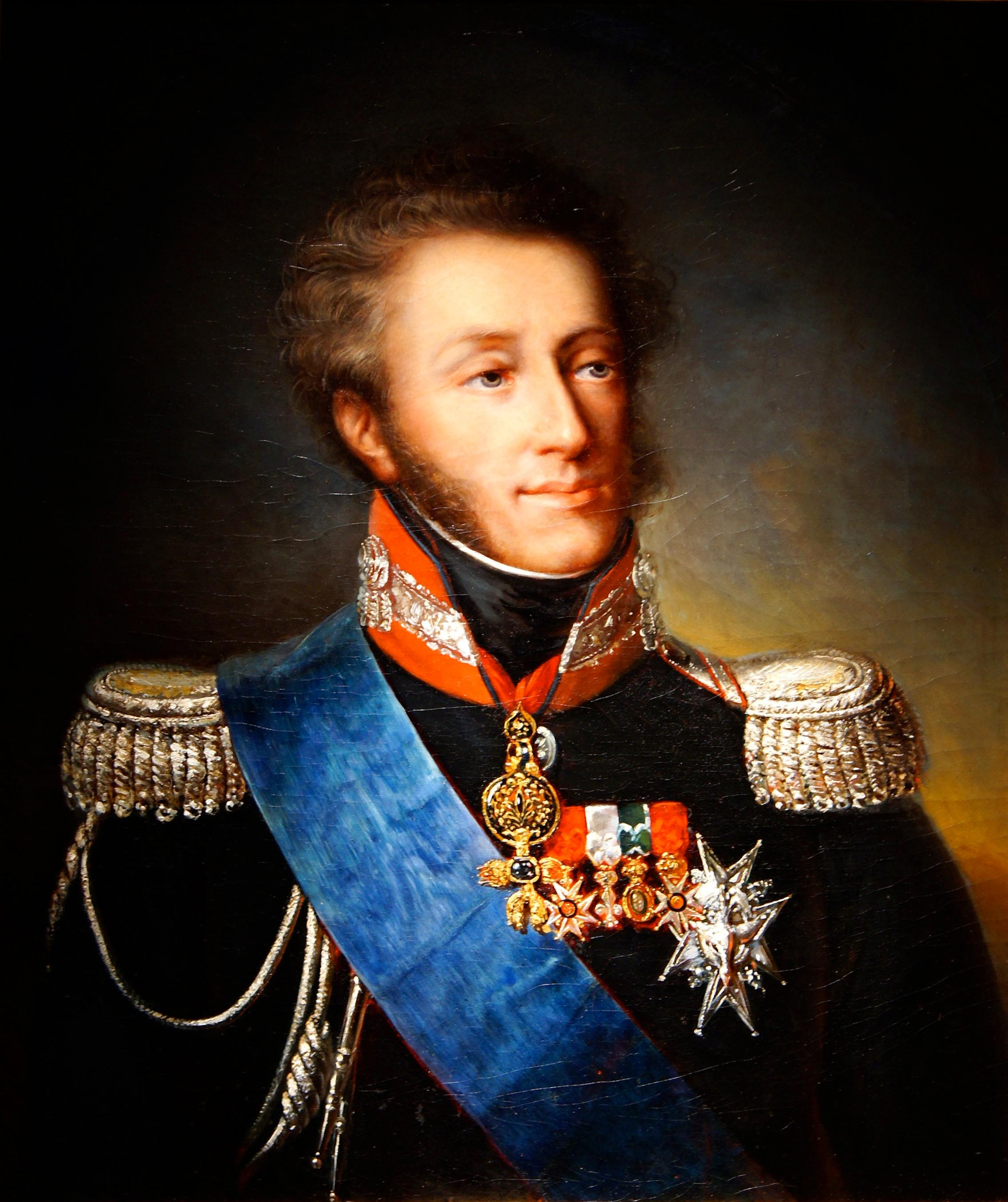
Louis XIX, the shortest serving monarch

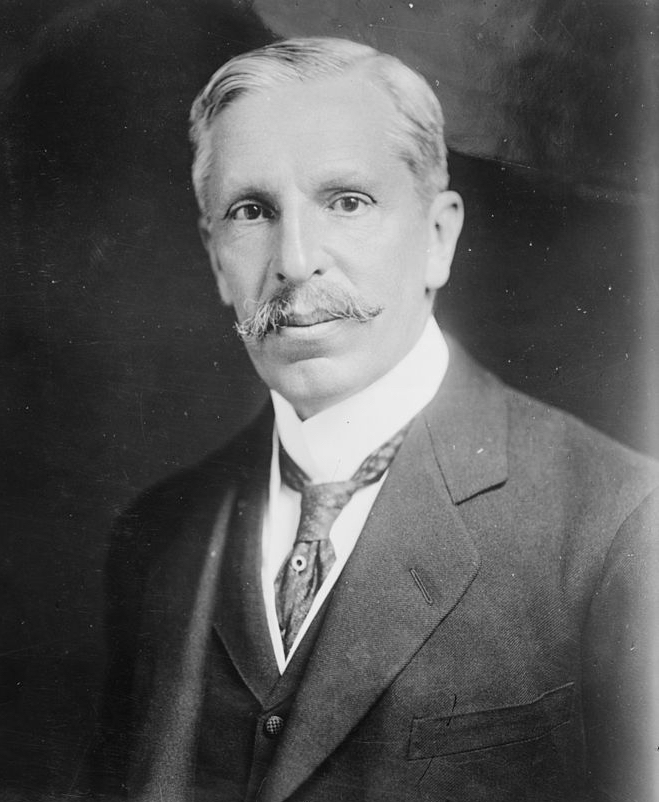
Pedro Lascuráin, the shortest serving non-royal head of state

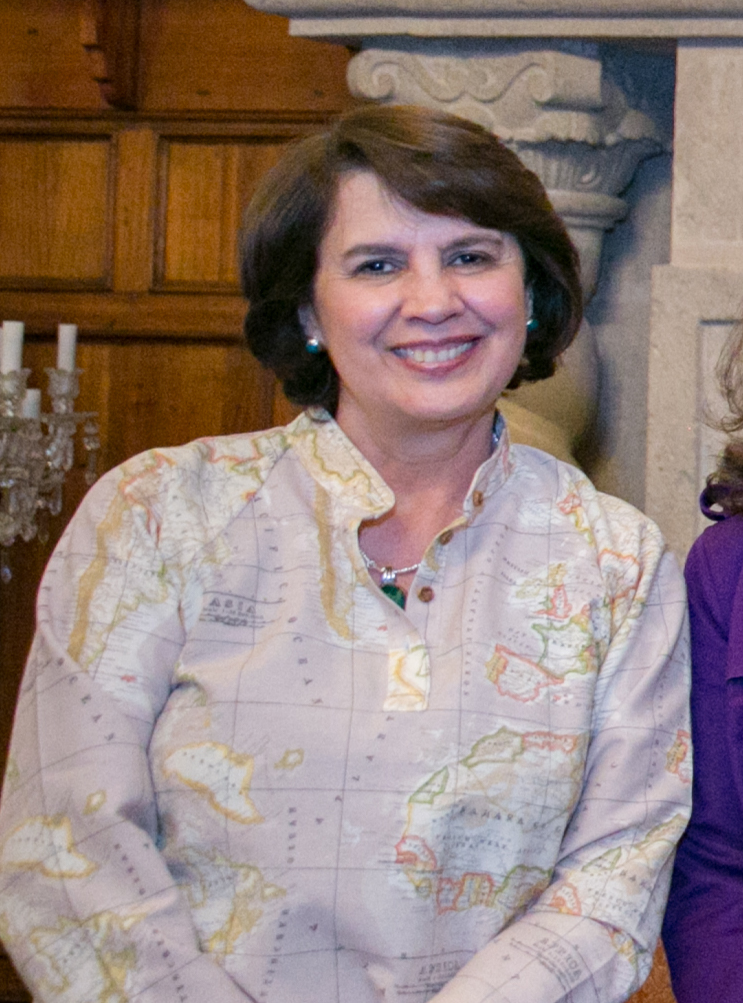
Rosalía Arteaga, the shortest serving female non-royal head of state

The shortest serving male monarch of all time is believed to be Louis XIX of France. After his father's abdication during the July Revolution on 2 August 1830, he ascended to the throne, but abdicated around 20 minutes later. This reign is disputed, as some historians believe this reign is too short to be valid. The next contender is the unnamed daughter of Emperor Xiaoming of Northern Wei who was appointed by her grandmother, Empress Dowager Hu. She reigned for a matter of hours until being replaced by Yuan Zhao.

In more recent history, Dipendra was the undisputed king of Nepal for only around 37 hours in 2001, after perpetrating the massacre of his father the king and his family.

The shortest serving president is Pedro Lascuráin, who was the 38th president of Mexico for less than an hour on 19 February 1913 during a coup d'état. Pedro Carmona was the acting president of Venezuela for 36 hours in 2002 during a coup attempt against Hugo Chávez.

The shortest serving female president is Rosalía Arteaga, who was the 39th president of Ecuador for 2 days in 1997 from 9 to 11 February.

== Age ==
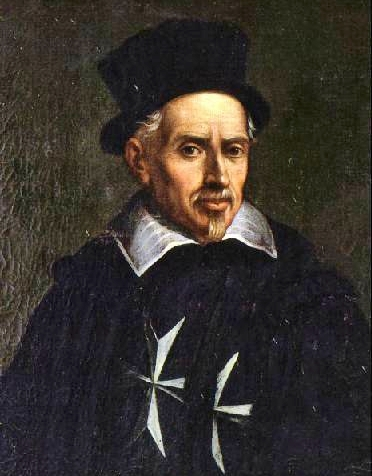
Giovanni Paolo Lascaris, the oldest verifiable head of state at the time of dying in office

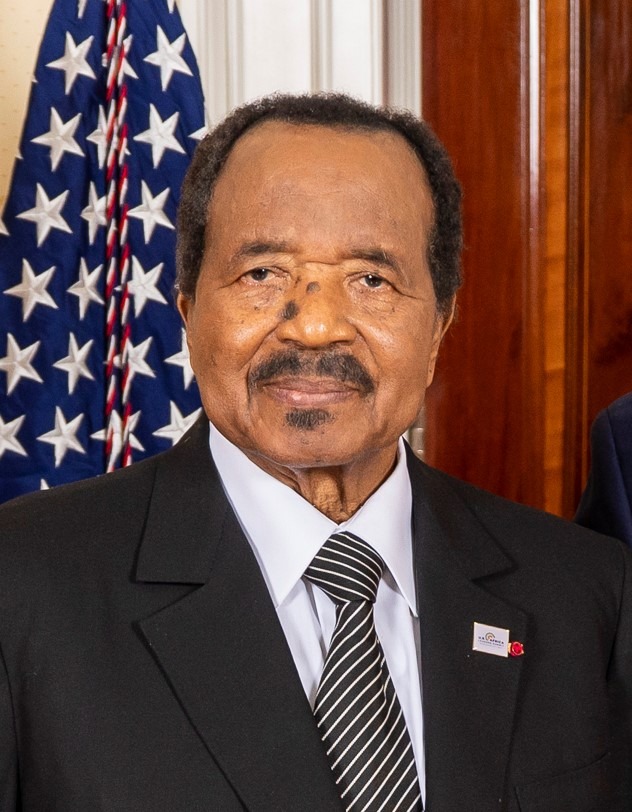
Paul Biya, the current oldest head of state

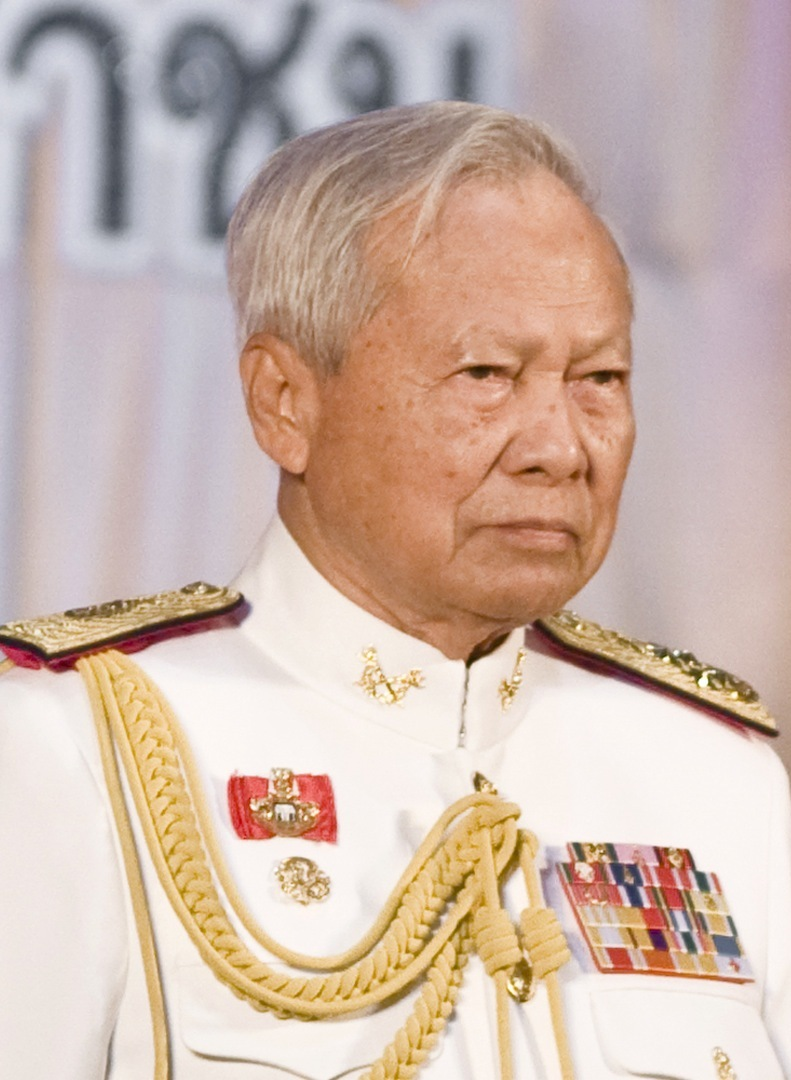
Prem Tinsulanonda, the oldest ruler at the time of assuming office

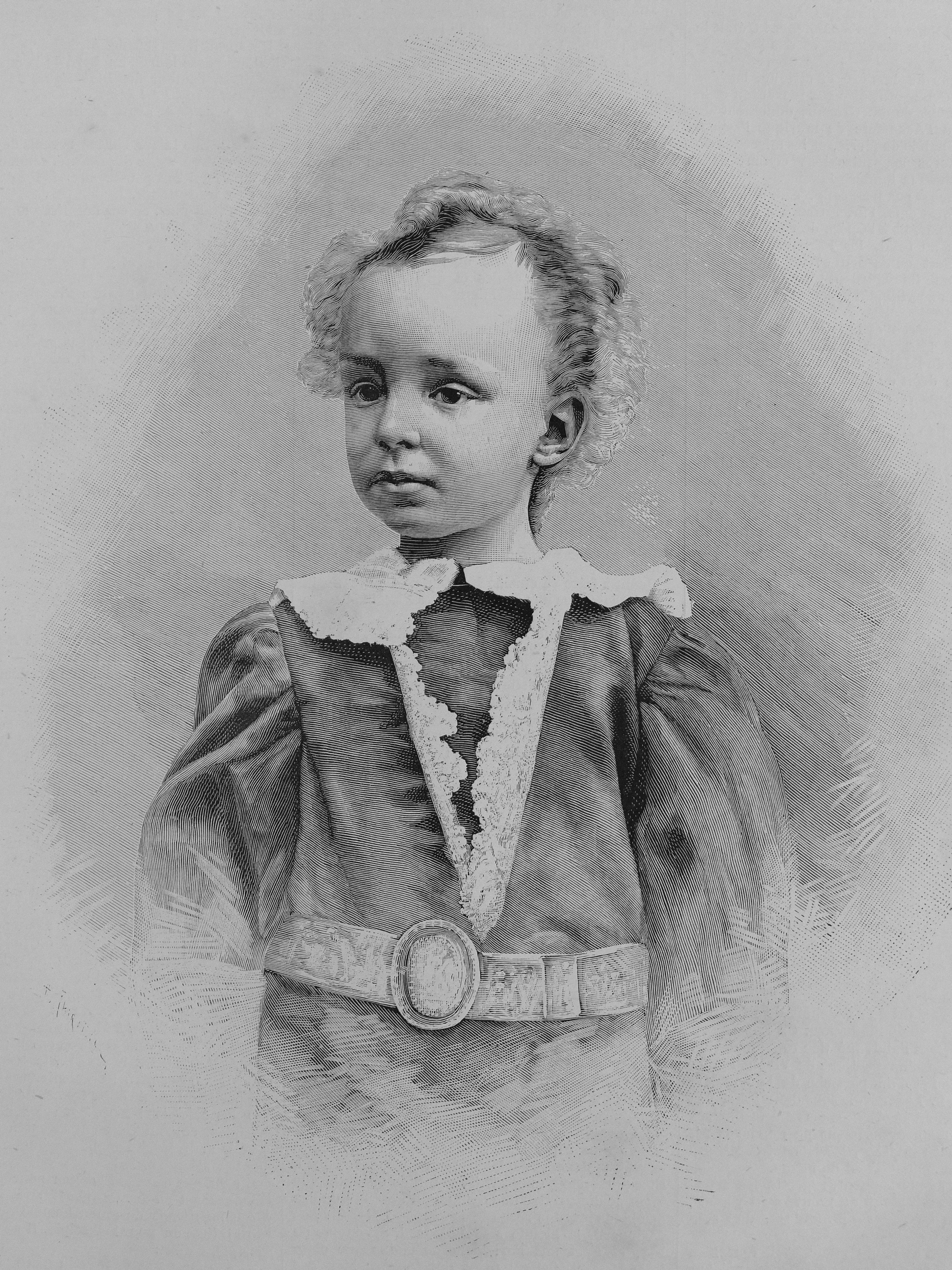
Alfonso XIII, the youngest verifiable head of state at the time of assuming office

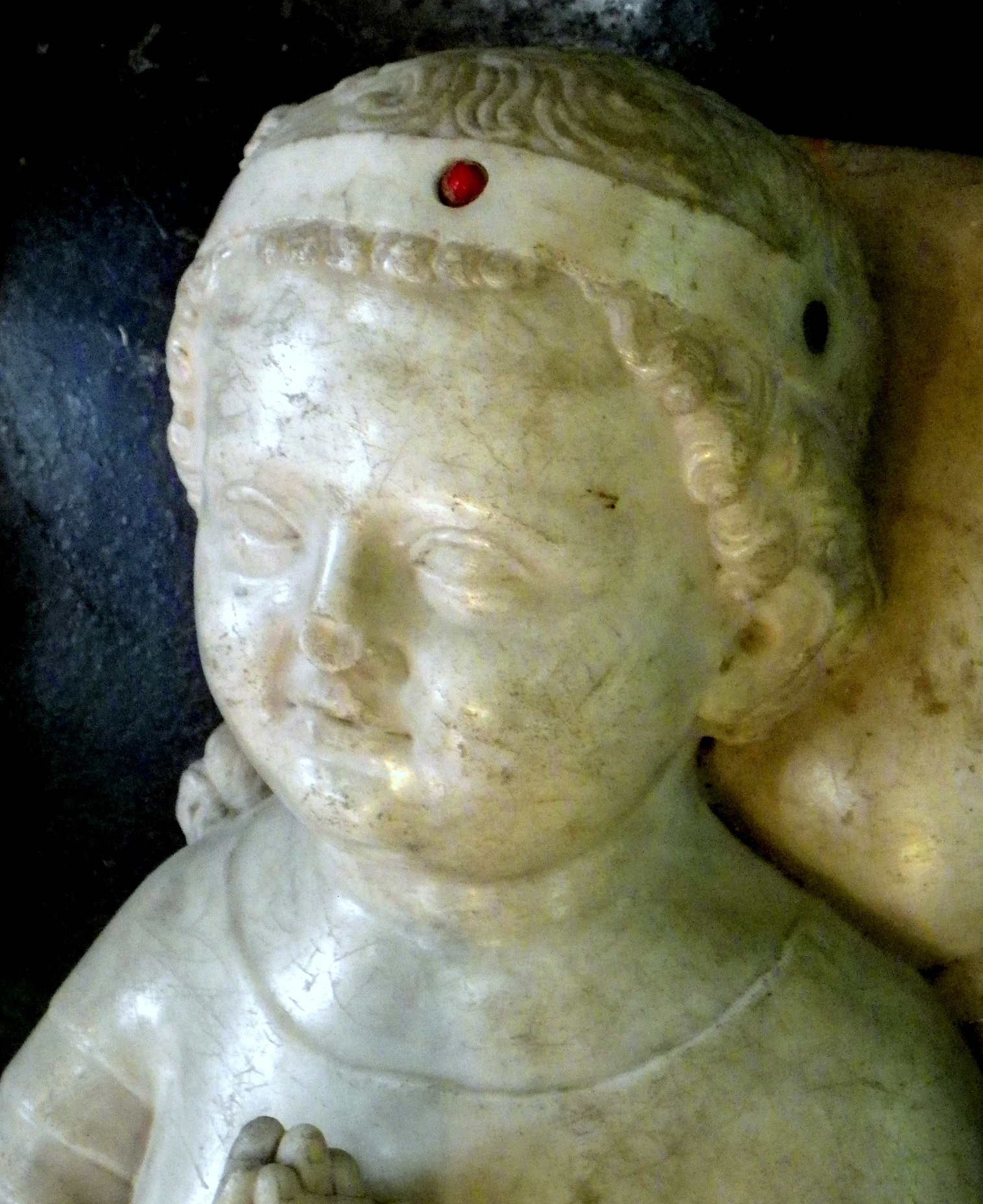
Jean I, the shortest-lived head of state

=== Oldest ===
The oldest ruler whose date of birth is known is Giovanni Paolo Lascaris, who was Grand Master of the Order of Saint John when he died aged 97 years and 47 days. The oldest ruler at the time of taking office is Prem Tinsulanonda, who briefly served as regent of Thailand at the age of 96 years and 48 days.

The oldest incumbent president is Paul Biya of Cameroon, who is 93 years and 273 days old. The oldest president at the time of taking office is Beji Caid Essebsi, who became president of Tunisia at the age of 88 years and 32 days.

The oldest monarch at the time of accession is Nang Keo Phimpha of Lan Xang (present day Laos), who briefly reigned at the age of 95. The oldest male monarch at the time of accession is Nawaf Al-Sabah of Kuwait, who ascended the throne at the age of 83 years and 96 days.

=== Youngest ===
The youngest claimed ruler is Shapur II of the Persian Sasanian Empire, who, according to legend, was crowned in utero when a crown was placed on the belly of Hormizd II's wife, Ifra Hormizd, after his death. This claim was disputed by Alireza Shapour Shahbazi. There have also been numerous other cases of monarchs born posthumously, with the most recent being Bikramaditya Singh of the Rajgarh State within the British Raj on 18 December 1936.

The youngest verifiable monarch of a sovereign state is Alfonso XIII of Spain, who became king at his birth on 17 May 1886. The youngest female monarch is Mary, Queen of Scots, who became queen of Scotland at 6 days old.

The youngest non-royal ruler is Augustus who became consul at age of 19 years and 211 days.

The youngest president is Jean-Claude Duvalier who became president of Haiti at 19 years and 293 days. The youngest incumbent president is Ibrahim Traoré of Burkina Faso, who is 38 years and 244 days old.

=== Longest lived ===
The longest lived undisputed head of state is Celâl Bayar, who was president of Turkey from 1950 to 1960. He lived from 16 May 1883 to 22 August 1986 and died at the age of 103 years and 98 days. The longest lived female head of state is Khertek Anchimaa-Toka, who was the partially recognised chair of the Presidium of Tuva. She lived from early 1912 until her death on 4 November 2008 at the age of 96.

The longest lived undisputed monarch is Jean, who was Grand Duke of Luxembourg from 1964 until his abdication in 2000. He lived from 5 January 1921 until his death on 23 April 2019 aged 98 years and 108 days. The longest lived female monarch is Elizabeth II, who was 96 years and 140 days old at the time of her death.

The oldest living former head of state is Guillermo Rodríguez, who was acting president of Ecuador from 1972 to 1976 and is currently 103 years and 9 days old. The oldest living female former head of state is Vigdís Finnbogadóttir, who served as president of Iceland from 1980 to 1996 and is currently 96 years and 212 days old.

The monarch with the longest-lived period after leaving office is Simeon II (Note: Simeon later served as prime minister of Bulgaria under the name Simeon Sakskoburggotski.) of Bulgaria, who has lived for 80 years and 59 days after reigning as tsar of Bulgaria from 1943 to 1946. The female monarch with the longest-lived period after abdication is Isabella II of Spain who lived 35 years and 190 days after her abdication.

The longest post-presidency is that of Wellington Koo, president of the Republic of China who lived 58 years and 151 days after leaving office. The longest female post-presidency (and of any female head of state), at 50 years and 234 days, is that of Isabel Perón, who served as president of Argentina from 1974 to 1976.

=== Shortest lived ===
The shortest lived undisputed monarch is John I of France and Navarre, who reigned and lived for 4 days in 1316. The shortest lived female monarch is Margaret of Scotland, who died at the age of 7. The shortest lived undisputed president is Michael Collins of the Irish Free State who died at the age of 31 years and 310 days.

== Ruling houses ==
=== Oldest ===
Officially, the current Emperor of Japan, Naruhito is the 126th in line from the first emperor, Jimmu, who is variously believed to have reigned in the 1st or 7th century BC. The earliest documented evidence is only for the 29th emperor, Kinmei (AD 509–571); however, this is sufficient such that even the most conservative of estimates still places the Japanese imperial family as among the oldest lines in the world today.

== Post-nominal numbers ==
The highest post-nominal number representing a member of a royal house is 75, used by Count Heinrich LXXV Reuss zu Schleiz (r. 1800–1801). All male members of the branch were named Heinrich, and were successively numbered from I upwards, from the beginning of each century.

== Physical attributes ==
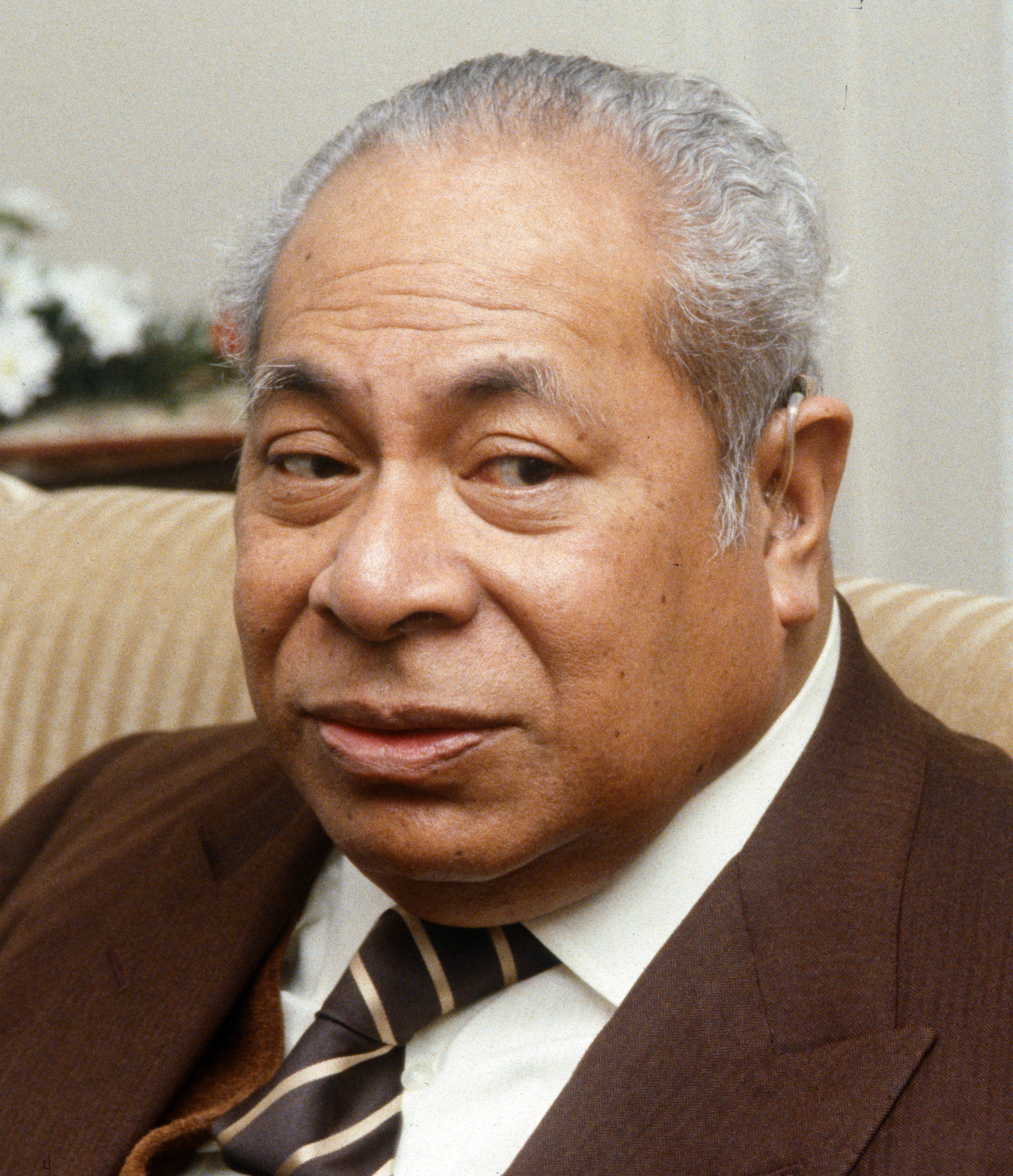
Tāufaʻāhau Tupou IV, the heaviest head of state

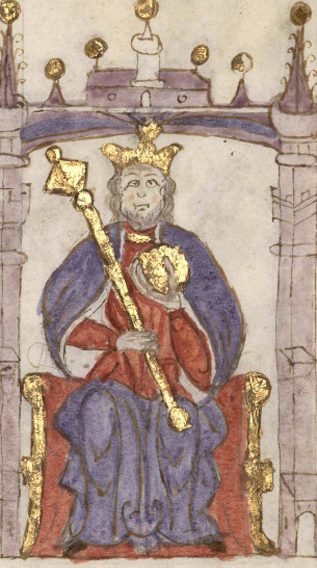
Sancho VII of Navarre, the tallest verifiable ruler

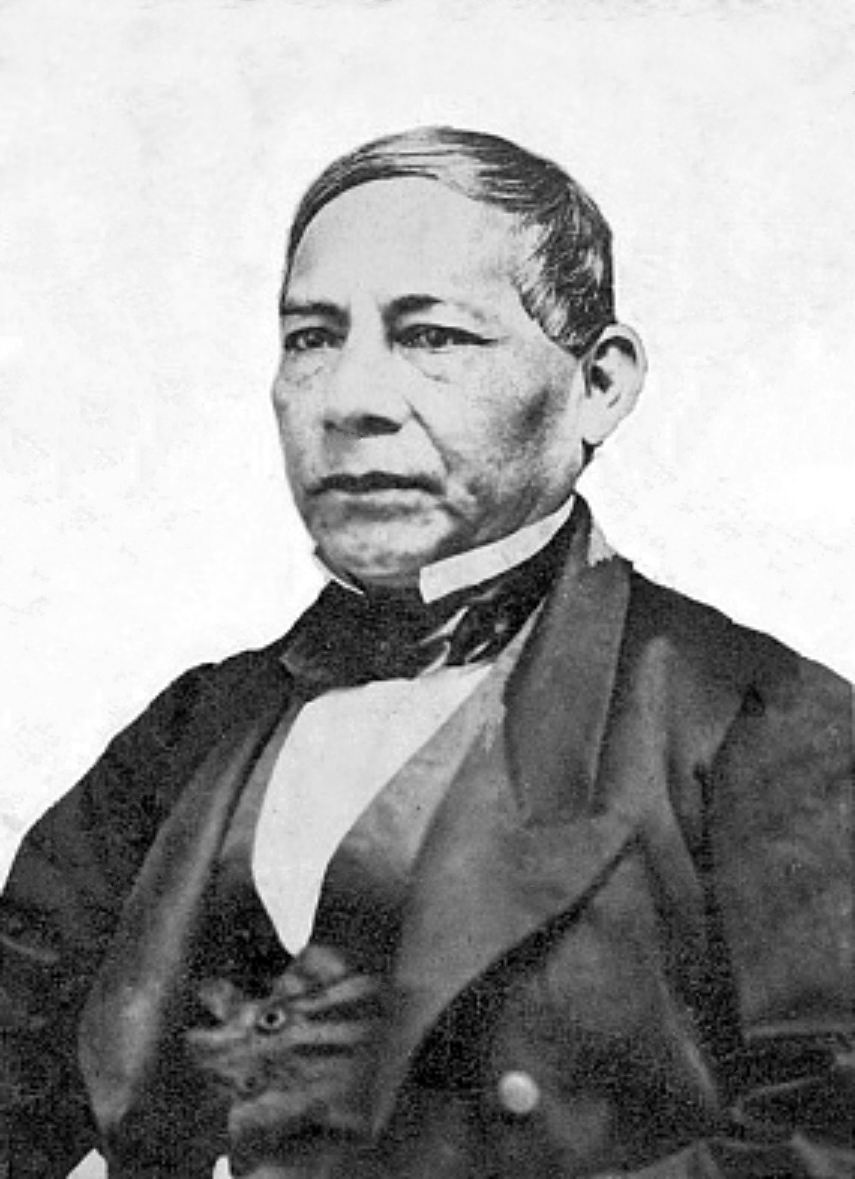
Benito Juárez, the shortest head of state

=== Heaviest ===
The heaviest monarch is believed to have been Tāufaʻāhau Tupou IV, King of Tonga from 1965 to 2006, who at his peak in 1976 was measured as being 208.7 kg (460 lb, or 32 st 12 lb), though he subsequently lost around 40% of his weight.

=== Tallest ===
The tallest height of a president is that of Daniel Chapo of Mozambique standing at 6 ft 8 in (2.03 m) tall.

One of the tallest rulers in history was Dusan the Mighty, who was King of Serbia (1331–1345) and later Tsar of Serbs, Greeks, and Bulgarians (1346–1355). He was 214 centimetres (7 ft 0 in) tall, in that time the average height was 165–170 centimetres (5 ft 5 in – 5 ft 7 in), so he searched all over Europe to find 101 men over 2 metres (6 ft 7 in) tall to be part of his personal guard.

On the other hand, Herodotus wrote in Histories (7:117) that "Xerxes was in stature the tallest of all the Persians, falling short by only four fingers of being five royal cubits in height." A royal cubit is assumed to be a bit more than 20 English inches (52 cm), which makes Xerxes almost 8 feet tall (2.43 m), though this is likely legendary. Sancho VII of Navarre was reported to be 7 ft 4 in (2.24 m).

=== Shortest ===
President Benito Juárez of Mexico was reportedly the shortest world leader, standing at 4 ft 6 in (1.37 m).

The shortest monarch is Queen Victoria of the British Empire, who was believed to be around 4 ft 9 in (1.45 m). Two Egyptian pharaohs were also said to be very short, Cleopatra VII was said to be 5 ft 0 in (1.52 m) and Amenhotep I is claimed to be the shortest male monarch at 5 ft 4 in (1.63 m).

== See also ==
- List of state leaders by age
- List of longest-living state leaders
- List of oldest living state leaders
- Records of prime ministers of Australia
- Records of prime ministers of the United Kingdom
