= 1960 Salvadoran coup d'état =

Overthrow of President José María Lemus

Date	26 October 1960
Location	El Salvador
Result	Coup successful: Formation of military junta

Belligerents
(El Salvador) Military dictatorship	(El Salvador) Armed Forces (rebels)

Commanders and leaders
(El Salvador) José María Lemus	(El Salvador) César Yanes Urías

The 1960 Salvadoran coup d'état also known as El Madrugón de los Compadres, was the successful overthrow in El Salvador of the José Maria Lemus administration by leftist elements of the military and civilians. The coup resulted in establishing a six-person military junta composed of three military officials and three civilians led by Colonel César Yanes Urías. After three months, the military junta was deposed in a countercoup by the military establishment, determined to "rid the country of communism."

The successful coup attempt followed a period of civil unrest against the Lemus government, with student demonstrations being held demanding the resignation of President Lemus and the establishment of a truly democratic system in El Salvador. The demonstrations were inspired by Fidel Castro and the Cuban Revolution. A declining economy caused by lower coffee and cotton export prices and repressive electoral legislation were primary contributors. In response, President Lemus backtracked on his initial reformist policies of general amnesty for political dissidents and abolishment of repressive policies by the previous regimes. He further reversed his policies by reinstating authoritarian laws such as banning of free expression and assembly, and arbitrary detaining of political opponents.

Recognizing the untenable situation and President Lemus' loss of control, the military staged a bloodless coup, deposing him on 26 October 1960. The transitional military junta that took power shortly after, which was named the Junta of Government, proclaimed the continued use of the 1950 Constitution and promised elections. In spite of initial opposition from the United States Department of Defense (DoD) and concern from the US intelligence community, the United States extended recognition to the provisional government.

Three months later on 25 January 1961, a counter-coup led by conservative officers deposed the Junta of Government and established a new military junta named the Civic-Military Directory. Martial law was temporarily imposed from 25 January until 30 January. Elections were eventually held in December of that year and a provisional president was elected on 8 January 1962.
