= Valiente (surname) =

Valiente is a surname. Notable people with the surname include:

- Alonso Valiente, Spanish conquistador
- José María Valiente Soriano (1900–1982), Spanish Carlist politician
- Carlos Enrique Díaz Sáenz Valiente (1917–1956), Argentine sport shooter
- Doreen Valiente (1922–1999), English Wiccan and occult writer
- Juan Valiente (died 1533), Spanish conquistador
- José Francisco Valiente (1911–1988), Salvadoran politician
- Marc Valiente (born 1987), Spanish footballer
- Mariano Vivanco Valiente (1933–2004), Cuban Roman Catholic bishop
- Mauro Valiente (born 2000), Argentine footballer
- Randy Valiente, Filipino comic book artist
