= Junta of Government (El Salvador) =

Military regime in El Salvador

The Junta of Government was a military junta established by Salvadoran military officers on 26 October 1960 after a coup d'état toppled President José María Lemus.

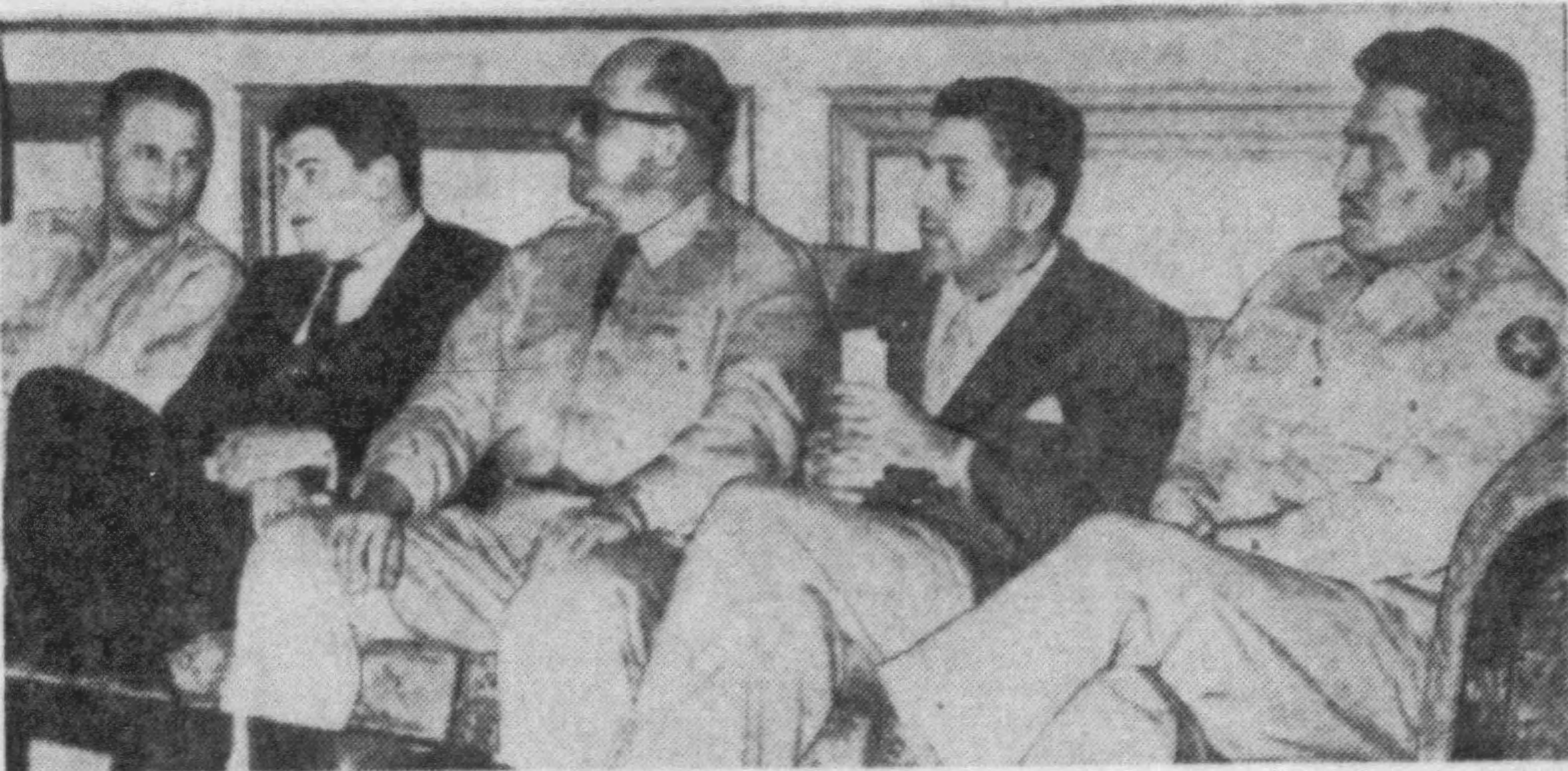
Yanes, Carceres, Miguel Castillo, Fortín, and Rosales

== History ==
On 26 October 1960, the Armed Forces of El Salvador overthrew President José María Lemus and established a military junta.

The junta claimed its purpose was to enforce the 1950 Salvadoran Constitution and to mediate genuine presidential elections.

The junta of 1960 ended after the 1961 coup d'état overthrew the junta and all its members were exiled. The Civic-Military Directory was established in its place by military officers.

== Members ==
The junta was led by three civilians and three military officers:

- Lawyer Ricardo Falla Cáceres (1929–1990)
- Lawyer René Fortín Magaña (1931–2020)
- Doctor Fabio Castillo Figueroa (1921–2012)
- Colonel César Yanes Urías (1920–2024)
- Lieutenant Colonel Miguel Ángel Castillo Maldonado (1915–pre-1980)
- Major Rubén Alonso Rosales (1925–2000)
