= José Francisco Valiente =

Salvadoran politician

- Born: March 23, 1911
- Died: August 1, 1988 (aged 77)
- Occupation: Politician

José Francisco Valiente Salazar (March 23, 1911 – August 1, 1988) was a Salvadoran politician who was, a member of the Civic-Military Directory, which ruled the country from 25 January 1961 until 25 January 1962. Valiente resigned from his position on 6 April 1961. He died in August 1988 at the age of 77.
