= Aníbal Portillo =

Salvadoran politician

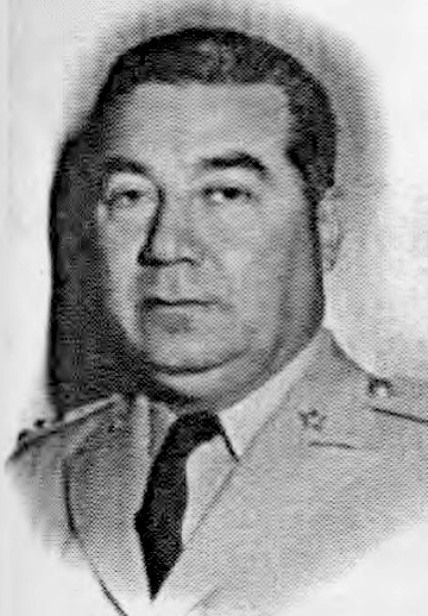
Colonel Aníbal Portillo

Aníbal Portillo (20 December 1914 – 15 February 2010) was a Salvadoran politician who was a member of the Civic-Military Directory, which ruled the country from 25 January 1961 until 25 January 1962.
