= Valiente Peak =

Mountain in Antarctica

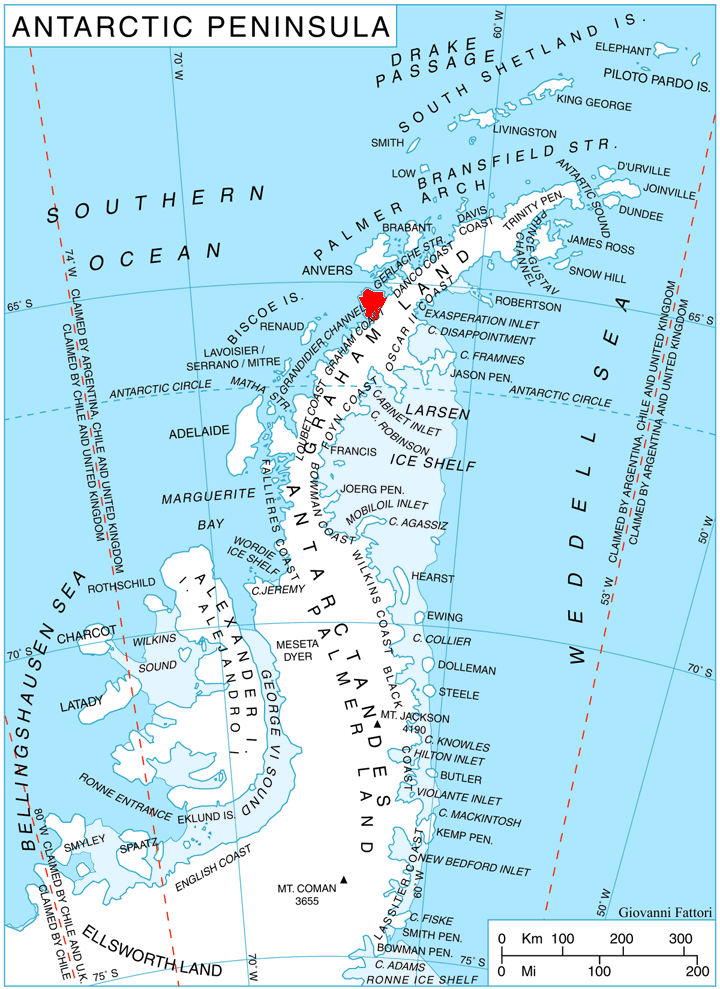
Location of Kyiv Peninsula in Graham Land, Antarctic Peninsula.

Valiente Peak (65°27′S 63°43′W) is a peak (2,165 m) on Kyiv Peninsula on the west coast of Graham Land, standing close north of the mouth of Lever Glacier where the latter enters Beascochea Bay. It was discovered by the French Antarctic Expedition, 1908–10, under Charcot and named by him "Sommet Saens Valiente," probably for Captain J.P. Saenz Valiente of Argentina. It was remapped by the British Graham Land Expedition (BGLE) under Rymill during surveys in Beascochea Bay in August 1935 and a journey to Trooz Glacier in January 1936. The name was shortened by the United Kingdom Antarctic Place-Names Committee (UK-APC) in 1959.
