= César Yanes Urías =

Salvadoran naval officer politician (1920–2024)

Colonel César Yanes Urías
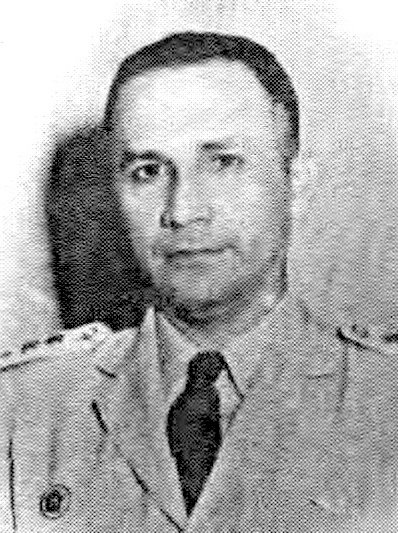
- César in the 1960s

Member of the Junta of Government
- In office 26 October 1960 – 25 January 1961

Personal details
- Born: César Yanes Urías; 24 April 1920 El Salvador
- Died: 4 December 2024 (aged 104) El Salvador
- Occupation: Military officer, politician

Military service
- Allegiance: El Salvador
- Branch: Salvadoran Navy
- Service years: 1954–1965
- Rank: Colonel
- Battles/wars: 1960 Salvadoran coup d'état

César Yanes Urías (24 April 1920 – 4 December 2024) was a Salvadoran naval officer and politician who was a member of the Junta of Government, that ruled the country from 26 October 1960 until 25 January 1961. He was a member of the Salvadoran naval forces. Yanes Urías was born on 24 April 1920. He turned 100 on 24 April 2020 and died on 4 December 2024, at the age of 104.
