= Civic-Military Directory =

Salvadoran military junta

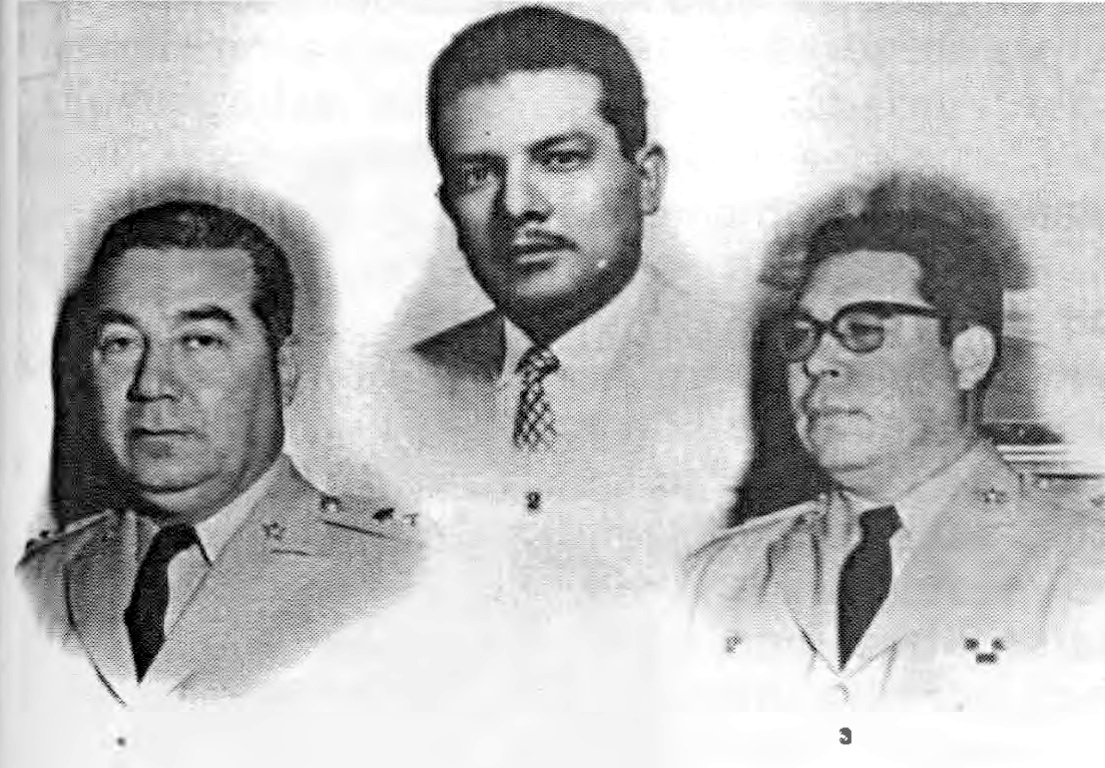
Final members of the Civic-Military Directory, from september 13 of 1961 to january 25 of 1962. From left to right: Cnel. Aníbal Portillo, Dr. Feliciano Avelar y Cnel. Mariano Castro Morán

The Civic-Military Directory was a political body which ruled El Salvador from 25 January 1961 until 25 January 1962.

Its members were:

- Aníbal Portillo (whole time)
- Feliciano Avelar (whole time)
- José Antonio Rodríguez Porth (until 6 April 1961)
- José Francisco Valiente (until 6 April 1961)
- Julio Adalberto Rivera Carballo (until 11 September 1961)
- Mariano Castro Morán (from 11 September 1961)
