= List of conflicts related to the Cold War =

While the Cold War itself never escalated into direct confrontation between the United States and the Soviet Union, there were a number of conflicts and revolutions related to the Cold War around the globe, spanning the entirety of the period usually prescribed to it (March 12, 1947 to December 26, 1991, a total of 44 years, 9 months, and 14 days).

== Since 1944 ==
Conflict	Start date	End date	Western Bloc related	Eastern Bloc related	Region	Result
Dekemvriana	3 December 1944	11 January 1945	Kingdom of Greece: Georgios Papandreou Government (1944); Nikolaos Plastiras Government (1945); 3rd Mountain Brigade; Sacred Band; Hellenic Gendarmerie; Cities Police; National Guard; (Kingdom of Greece) ΡΕΑΝ (Kingdom of Greece) RAN; Organization X Ex-members of the Security Battalions; EDES (in Epirus); United Kingdom: British Army	(Greece) EAM: (Greece) ELAS; (Greece) National Civil Guard; OPLA; (Greece) Students Band "Lord Byron"; other EAM's organizations	Southern Europe	Western Bloc victory
Anti-Communist resistance in Poland	1944	1953 (1963)	Cursed soldiers	Poland; Soviet Union	Central Europe	Eastern Bloc victory
Insurgency in the Baltic States	1944	1953	Lithuanian partisans Latvian partisans Estonian partisans	Soviet Union: Lithuanian SSR; Latvian SSR; Estonian SSR	Northeastern Europe	Eastern Bloc victory
Indonesian National Revolution	August 17, 1945	December 27, 1949	Netherlands (Note: from 1946): Dutch East Indies; KNIL; NICA; Pao An Tui (Note: claimed neutrality); United Kingdom (Note: until 1946): British Raj; Japan	Indonesia: PDRI (Note: 1948-1949, after Operation Kraai); TNI; POLRI; Japanese holdouts; British Indian volunteers (Note: after 1947); DI/TII (from 1949) FDR Small guerrilla groups	Southeast Asia	Indonesia gained independence
End of World War II
Civil conflicts in Vietnam (1945–1949)	August 1945	June 1949	Viet Minh: Indochinese Communist Party; France (1946)	Nationalist Parties Front: Đại Việt QDĐ; Việt Nam QDĐ; Vietnam Revolutionary League; Đại Việt Duy dân Đảng; Hòa Hảo; Cao Đài; Bình Xuyên Trotskyists Autonomous Cochinchina; Provisional Central Government of Vietnam (1948–1949) French Union (1948–1949)	Southeast Asia	Cold War intensified
Iran crisis of 1946	November 15, 1945	December 15, 1946	Iran; Supported by: United Kingdom; United States	Azerbaijan People's Government; Republic of Mahabad; Tudeh Military Network; Supported by: Soviet Union	Southern Asia	Western Bloc victory
Greek Civil War	March 30, 1946	October 16, 1949	Kingdom of Greece: Hellenic Army; Royal Hellenic Air Force (minor participation); Royal Hellenic Navy (limited participation in support); Royal Gendarmerie; MAY (1946–1948); TEA (1948–1949); Supported by: United Kingdom (1944–1947); United States (1946–1949)	Provisional Democratic Government (from 1947): Democratic Army (from December 1946); Communist Party of Greece and allies; Ex-EAM members and other communist guerrillas' local groups (March 1946 – December 1946); People's Civil Guard; Supported by: Yugoslavia (1946–1948); Bulgaria; Albania; Soviet Union (limited)	Southern Europe	Western Bloc victory
Corfu Channel incident	May 15, 1946	November 13, 1946	United Kingdom	Albania	Southern Europe	
Chinese Civil War (post-WWII)	10 August 1945	7 December 1949	1945–1949 (Republic of China (1912–1949)) Republic of China: Kuomintang; Republic of China Armed Forces	1945–1949 Yan'an Soviet People's Republic of China (1949): Chinese Communist Party; People's Liberation Army	Eastern Asia	Eastern Bloc victory
Hukbalahap Rebellion	July 4, 1946	May 17, 1954	Philippines; Supported by: United States	Philippine Communist Party	Southeast Asia	Western Bloc victory
Turkish Straits crisis	20 July 1936	30 May 1953	Turkey; Supported by: United States	Soviet Union	Southern Europe	
First Indochina War	19 December 1946	21 July 1954	French Union: France; French Indochina; State of Vietnam; Kingdom of Cambodia; Kingdom of Laos; United States (1953–54): CIA	Democratic Republic of Vietnam: (North Vietnam) Việt Minh	Southeast Asia	Eastern Bloc victory
Paraguayan Civil War	March 7, 1947	August 20, 1947	Paraguayan Government; Military of Paraguay; Colorado militias Supported by: Argentina; United States	Liberal Party; Febrerista Revolutionary Concentration; Paraguayan Communist Party	South America	Western Bloc victory
Romanian anti-communist resistance movement	1944	1962	Anti-communist groups: Nationalists; Monarchists; National Peasantists; Iron Guards; Supported by: United States; United Kingdom; CNR	Kingdom of Romania (until 1947); Romanian People's Republic (from 1947): PCR; Securitate; Supported by: Soviet Union	Central Europe	Eastern Bloc victory
1948 Czechoslovak coup d'état	February 20, 1948	February 25, 1948	President National Socialist Party (Note: Founded as the Czech National Social Party in 1897, the party's name was changed to the Czechoslovak National Socialist Party in 1926.); People's Party; Democratic Party; Social Democracy (anti-communist factions)	Prime Minister Communist Party; Social Democracy (pro-communist factions) Supported by: Soviet Union	Central Europe	Eastern Bloc victory
Costa Rican Civil War	March 12, 1948	April 24, 1948	National Liberation Army; Ulatista Forces; Caribbean Legion; Supported by: Guatemala; United States	Government of Costa Rica; Calderon forces People's Vanguard Party; Nicaraguan National Guard	Central America	Western Bloc victory
Communist insurgency in Burma	April 2, 1948	April 16, 1989	Union of Burma	Communist Party of Burma (1948–1989); Communist Party (Burma) (1948–1978); Shan State Communist Party (1956–1958)	Southeast Asia	Western Bloc victory
Jeju uprising	April 3, 1948	May, 1949	United States Army Military Government in Korea (until August 1948); South Korea (from August 1948); Northwest Youth League; Korean Youth League	Workers' Party of South Korea: Local supporters	Eastern Asia	Western Bloc victory
First Arab–Israeli War	May 15, 1948	March 10, 1949	Israel Before 26 May 1948: (Israel) Yishuv; Paramilitary groups: Haganah; Palmach; Hish; Him; Irgun; Lehi; Allied Bedouin tribes After 26 May 1948: Israel Defense Forces; Minorities Unit; Foreign volunteers: Mahal	Arab League: Egypt; All-Palestine Protectorate (Note: After 22 September 1948); Holy War Army; Transjordan; Iraq; Syria; Lebanon (Note: Lebanon had decided to not participate in the war and only took part in the battle of al-Malikiya on 5–6 June 1948.); Saudi Arabia; Yemen Irregulars: Arab Liberation Army; Al-Najjada; Holy War Army	Western Asia	Israeli Victory
Malayan Emergency	June 16, 1948	July 12, 1960	British Commonwealth forces: United Kingdom: Federation of Malaya; Singapore; Malacca (until 1957); Penang (until 1957); Kenya; Southern Rhodesia (until 1953); Rhodesia and Nyasaland (from 1953); Fiji; Australia; New Zealand; Supported by: Thailand (Thai–Malaysian border)	Communist forces: Malayan Communist Party; Malayan National Liberation Army	Southeast Asia	Western Bloc victory
Berlin Blockade	June 24, 1948	May 12, 1949	United States; United Kingdom; France; Canada; Australia; New Zealand; South Africa	Soviet Union	Western Europe	Western Bloc victory
Albanian–Yugoslav border conflict	1948	1954	(Socialist Federal Republic of Yugoslavia) FPR Yugoslavia Financial/Military Support: United States	PR Albania	Southeast Europe	Inconclusive

== Since 1950s ==
Conflict	Start date	End date	Western Bloc related	Eastern Bloc related	Region	Result
Cazin Rebellion	May 5, 1950	May 6, 1950	Civilians and rebels	Yugoslavia: Yugoslav People's Army	Southeast Europe	Yugoslav victory
Korean War	June 25, 1950	July 27, 1953	South Korea; United Nations (Note: On 9 July 1951 troop constituents were: US: 70.4%; ROK: 23.3%; other UNC: 6.3%.); United States; ... see other countries	North Korea; China; Soviet Union (air support only)	Eastern Asia	Inconclusive
Egyptian Revolution of 1952	July 22, 1952	July 26, 1952	Kingdom of Egypt; Supported by: United Kingdom	(Egypt) Free Officers Movement; Supported by: United States	North Africa, Western Asia	Free Officers victory
Plzeň uprising of 1953	May 31, 1952	June 2, 1952	Demonstrators	Czechoslovakia	Central Europe	Eastern Bloc victory
Uprising of 1953 in East Germany	June 16, 1953	June 17, 1953	(East Germany) Anti-Stalinist demonstrators	East Germany; Soviet Union	Eastern Europe	Eastern Bloc Victory
Cuban Revolution	July 26, 1953	January 1, 1959	Cuba: Cuban Constitutional Army	26th of July Movement; Revolutionary Directorate of March 13th; Second National Front of Escambray	Caribbean	Revolutionary victory
1953 Iranian coup d'état	August 15, 1953	August 20, 1953	House of Pahlavi supporters; United States (Note: Covertly); United Kingdom	Iranian Government supporters	Southern Asia	Pahlavi victory
Laotian Civil War	November 9, 1953	December 2, 1975	Kingdom of Laos; Neutralists (1962–1966); United States; South Vietnam (until 1975); Thailand; Republic of China (until 1967)	Pathet Lao; North Vietnam; Neutralists (1960–1962); Patriotic Neutralists (1963–1969)	Southeast Asia	Pathet Lao-North Vietnamese victory
1954 Guatemalan coup d'état	June 18, 1954	June 27, 1954	Guatemalan rebel exiles: Guatemalan military (elements); Supported by: United States: CIA	Guatemalan government: Guatemalan military loyalists	Central America	Rebel-American victory
First Taiwan Strait Crisis	September 3, 1954	May 1, 1955	Republic of China; United States	People's Republic of China	Eastern Asia	Inconclusive
Algerian War	November 1, 1954	March 19, 1962	French Fourth Republic (1954–1958); French Fifth Republic (1958–1962); La Main Rouge; MPC; ANPA; FAF (1960–61); OAS (1961–62)	FLN; MNA; PCA	North Africa	Algerian victory
Calderonist Invasion on Costa Rica	January 7, 1955	February 21, 1955	Costa Rica; Supported by: United States; Organization of American States	Calderón forces Supported by: Nicaragua; Venezuela; Dominican Republic Guatemala (Diplomatic Support)	Central America	Costa Rican government victory
1955 Argentine coup d'état “Liberating Revolution”	September 16, 1955	September 23, 1955	(Argentina) Second Perónist Government (16 September 1955–19 September 1955) (Argentina) Military Junta Provisional Government (19 September 1955–23 September 1955): (Argentina) Armed Forces loyalists * Army loyalists * Air Force loyalists; Peronist Party; General Confederation of Labour; Nationalist Liberation Alliance	(Argentina) Revolutionary Provisional Government (16 September 1955–23 September 1955): (Argentina) Argentine Armed Forces * Argentine Army * Argentine Navy * Argentine Air Force; Argentine Federal Police; Argentine Opposition: Radical Civic Union; Socialist Party; National Democratic Party; Communist Party; Democrat Progressive Party; Christian Democrat Party	South America	Revolutionary victory
Vietnam War	November 1, 1955	April 30, 1975	South Vietnam; United States; South Korea; Australia; New Zealand; Laos; Cambodia (1967–1970); Khmer Republic (1970–1975); Thailand; Philippines; Taiwan; Spain	North Vietnam; Viet Cong and PRG; Pathet Lao; Khmer Rouge; GRUNK (from 1970); China (1965–1969); Soviet Union; North Korea	Southeast Asia	Eastern Bloc victory
Poznań 1956 protests	June 28, 1956	June 30, 1956	Protesters	Polish People's Army; Internal Security Corps; Służba Bezpieczeństwa	Central Europe	Polish government victory
Hungarian Revolution of 1956	October 23, 1956	November 10, 1956	Hungarian revolutionaries; From 28 October: Hungary (Nagy government)	Soviet Union; Until 28 October: Hungary; From 4 November: Kádár government	Central Europe	Eastern Bloc victory
Suez Crisis	October 29, 1956	November 7, 1956	Israel; United Kingdom; France	Egypt	North Africa, Western Asia	Egyptian victory
Ifni War	October 23, 1957	June 30, 1958	(Francoist Spain) Spain; (Francoist Spain) West Africa; (French Fourth Republic) France (1958); (French Fourth Republic) Mauritania	Morocco; Army of Liberation; Allied Sahrawi tribes	North Africa	Franco-Spanish victory
First Albanian air force incident against US air force	December 23, 1957	December 23, 1957	United States	Albania	Southeast Europe	Eastern Bloc victory
14 July Revolution	July 14, 1958	July 14, 1958	Arab Federation: Kingdom of Iraq; Royal Guard; Supported by: Kingdom of Jordan	(Iraq) Free Officers: 19th Brigade; 20th Brigade	Western Asia	Revolutionary victory
Second Taiwan Strait Crisis	August 23, 1958	October 6, 1958	Republic of China; United States	People's Republic of China	Eastern Asia	Taiwanese-American victory
1959 Mosul uprising	March 7, 1959	March 11, 1959	Arab nationalists: Ba'ath Party; (Arab Revolt) Sympathetic Arab tribes; Supported by: United Arab Republic; United States: CIA (alleged)	(Iraq) Iraqi Government; Communist Party; Kurdistan Democratic Party; Arab, Kurdish, and Assyrian peasants	Western Asia	Coup fails
1959 Tibetan uprising	March 10, 1959	March 21, 1959	Tibetan and Khampa protesters and guerrillas: Remnants of the Tibetan Army; Simultaneous rebellion in Kham and Amdo: Chushi Gangdruk; Supported by: Republic of China; United States (CIA); India (diplomatic)	People's Republic of China: People's Liberation Army	Central Asia	Eastern Bloc victory

== Since 1960s ==
Conflict	Start date	End date	Western Bloc related	Eastern Bloc related	Region
The attack on the Soviet naval presence	1961	1968	(People's Socialist Republic of Albania) Albania	(Soviet Union) Soviet Union; Supported by: Warsaw Pact: Bulgaria; Czechoslovakia; East Germany; Hungary; Poland	Southeast Europe
1960 U-2 incident	May 1, 1960	May 1, 1960	United States	Soviet Union: Soviet Air Defense Forces	Eastern Europe
Congo Crisis	June 30, 1960	November 25, 1965	1960–63: Katanga; South Kasai; Supported by: Belgium; France; South Africa September 1960–63: (Democratic Republic of the Congo) Republic of the Congo; Supported by: (United Nations) ONUC 1963–65: Democratic Republic of the Congo; United States; Belgium; Supported by: (United Nations) ONUC	July–September 1960: (Democratic Republic of the Congo) Republic of the Congo; Supported by: Soviet Union (United Nations) ONUC December 1960–62: (Democratic Republic of the Congo) Free Republic of the Congo; Supported by: Soviet Union 1963–65: Kwilu and Simba rebels Supported by: Soviet Union; China; Cuba	Central Africa
Political Crisis in Ecuador	September 1, 1960	August 10, 1979	Government of Ecuador	(Ecuador) Protesters and Militaries	South America
Guatemalan Civil War	November 13, 1960	December 19, 1996	Government of Guatemala; Mano Blanca; United States	PGT; FAR; URNG	Central America
Portuguese Colonial War	February 4, 1961	April 25, 1974	Portugal	MPLA; FNLA; UNITA; FLEC; PAIGC (Mozambique) FRELIMO	Western/Southern Africa
Angolan War of Independence	February 4, 1961	January 15, 1975	Portugal; South Africa	MPLA; FNLA; UNITA; FLEC; RDL	Southern Africa
Bay of Pigs Invasion	April 17, 1961	April 19, 1961	United States; Cuban DRF	Cuba	Caribbean
Berlin Crisis of 1961	June 4, 1961	November 9, 1961	West Germany; United States; United Kingdom; France	East Germany; Soviet Union	Western Europe
Nicaraguan Revolution	July 23, 1961	April 25, 1990	(Nicaragua) Somoza regime (Nicaragua) Contras; United States	FSLN; Panama (1978–1979)	Central America
Eritrean War of Independence	September 1, 1961	May 29, 1991	Before 1974: Ethiopian Empire After 1974: ELF EPLF; TPLF	Before 1974: ELF EPLF After 1974: PDR Ethiopia; Soviet Union; Cuba	Eastern Africa
Operation Trikora	December 19, 1961	August 15, 1962	Netherlands; Dutch New Guinea	Indonesia; Soviet Union	Southeast Asia
North Yemen Civil War	September 26, 1962	December 1, 1970	Kingdom of Yemen; Saudi Arabia; Supported by: Jordan (until 1963); United Kingdom; Israel (alleged); Iran; Pakistan	Yemen Arab Republic; Egypt; Supported by: Soviet Union	Western Asia
Cuban Missile Crisis	October 14, 1962	October 28, 1962	United States; Italy; Turkey	Soviet Union; Cuba	Caribbean
Sino-Indian War	October 20, 1962	November 21, 1962	China	India	Southern Asia
Indonesia-Malaysia confrontation	January 20, 1963	August 11, 1966	Malaysia; Singapore; United Kingdom; Brunei; Australia; New Zealand	Indonesia; North Kalimantan Communist Party; Brunei People's Party	Southeast Asia
Guinea-Bissau War of Independence	January 23, 1963	September 11, 1974	Portugal	PAIGC; Guinea (1970 only); Cuba	Western Africa
Ar-Rashid revolt	July 3, 1963	July 3, 1963	Iraqi Republic	Iraqi Army; Iraqi Communist Party	Western Asia
1964 Brazilian coup d'état	March 31, 1964	April 1, 1964	Brazilian Armed Forces Supported by: United States	Fourth Brazilian Republic	South America
Rhodesian Bush War	March 31, 1964	December 12, 1979	Southern Rhodesia (1964–1965); Rhodesia (1965–1979); Zimbabwe Rhodesia (1979); South Africa	ZANU (ZANLA) (Mozambique) FRELIMO ZAPU (ZIPRA); ANC (MK)	Southern Africa
Mexican Dirty War	December 1, 1964	December 1, 1982	Mexico Supported by: United States	Left-wing groups: People's Guerrilla Group; Party of the Poor; National Revolutionary Civic Association; Liga Comunista 23 de Septiembre; National Liberation Forces; Various other social and armed movements in the country	North America
Mozambican War of Independence	September 25, 1964	September 8, 1974	Portugal	FRELIMO	Eastern Africa
Colombian conflict	May 27, 1964	Present	Colombia	Far-Left Guerrillas; FARC; ELN; EPL; M-19; MOEC; MAQL AUC Medellín Cartel	South America
Communist insurgency in Thailand	January 1, 1965	April 26, 1983	Thailand; Republic of China (until 1967); Malaysia; United States	Communist Party of Thailand; Pathet Lao; Khmer Rouge (until 1978); Malayan Communist Party	Southeast Asia
Dominican Civil War	April 24, 1965	September 3, 1965	Dominican Republic (Loyalist military government); United States; IAPF	Dominican Republic (Constitutionalist)	Caribbean
Indo-Pakistani War of 1965	August 15, 1965	September 23, 1965	Pakistan	India	India Indian subcontinent
30 September Movement	September 30, 1965	October 1, 1965	Suharto-backed Armed Forces Supported by: United States	Sukarno government Communist Party of Indonesia; China	Southeast Asia
Indonesian killings of 1965–66	October 1, 1965	March 1966	Indonesia	PKI; Gerwani; Abangan atheists and Kafir ethnic Chinese	Southeast Asia
Cultural Revolution	May 16, 1966	October 6, 1976	Liu Shaoqi government	Mao Zedong government Red Guards	Eastern Asia
South African Border War	August 26, 1966	March 21, 1990	South Africa Portugal (until 1975); UNITA (from 1975); FNLA	SWAPO (PLAN); MPLA (FAPLA); Cuba; SWANU; ANC (MK); Zambia	Southern Africa
Bolivian Campaign	November 3, 1966	October 9, 1967	Bolivia; United States	National Liberation Army of Bolivia	South America
Araguaia Guerrilla War	1966	1975	Brazil	Communist Party of Brazil	South America
Cambodian Civil War	March 11, 1967	April 17, 1975	Kingdom of Cambodia (1968–1970); Khmer Republic (1970–1975); United States; South Vietnam	Khmer Rouge; GRUNK (1970–1975); FUNK; Khmer Rumdo; North Vietnam; Viet Cong	Southeast Asia
Six-Day War	June 5, 1967	June 10, 1967	Israel	Egypt; Syria; Jordan; Iraq; Saudi Arabia	Western Asia
Nigerian Civil War	July 5, 1967	January 13, 1970	Nigeria	Biafra	West Africa
War of Attrition	July 1, 1967	August 7, 1970	Israel	Egypt; Soviet Union; PLO; Jordan; Syria; Cuba; Kuwait	Western Asia
Communist Insurgency in Malaysia	June 17, 1968	December 2, 1989	Malaysia; Singapore; Thailand	Malayan Communist Party; North Kalimantan Communist Party; Communist Party of Thailand (until 1983)	Southeast Asia
Warsaw Pact invasion of Czechoslovakia	August 20, 1968	August 21, 1968	Czechoslovakia	Warsaw Pact: Soviet Union; Poland; Bulgaria; Hungary	Eastern Europe
Sino-Soviet border conflict	March 2, 1969	September 11, 1969	China	Soviet Union	Eastern Asia
1969 Sudanese coup d'état	May 25, 1969	May 25, 1969	Sudan	(Sudan) SAF Free Officers Movement	North Africa
Football War	July 14, 1969	July 18, 1969	El Salvador	Honduras	Central America
1969 Libyan coup d'état	September 1, 1969	September 1, 1969	Kingdom of Libya: Cyrenaican Defence Force	Free Officers Movement	North Africa
1969 Somali coup d'état	October 21, 1969	October 21, 1969	(Somalia) Somali Republic	(Somalia) Supreme Revolutionary Council	Eastern Africa

== Since 1970s ==
Conflict	Start date	End date	Western Bloc related	Eastern Bloc related	Region
Black September in Jordan	September 1, 1970	July 1971	Jordan; Pakistan	(Palestine) PLO; Syria; Iranian guerillas: OIPFG; MEK	Western Asia
First Quarter Storm	January 1970	March 1970	Government of Philippines	Moderate Opposition: Movement of Concerned Citizens for Civil Liberties; National Union of Students in the Philippines; National Students League; Young Christian Socialists Movement; Various labor organizations; Communist Party of the Philippines; Partido Komunista ng Pilipinas-1930	Southeast Asia
Bangladesh Liberation War	March 26, 1971	December 16, 1971	Pakistan; Supported by: United States; United Kingdom; France; China; Jordan; Iran; Saudi Arabia; Ceylon; Libya	Provisional Government of Bangladesh; India; Supported by: Soviet Union	South Asia
1971 JVP insurrection	April 5, 1971	June 1971	Ceylon: (Dominion of Ceylon) Sri Lankan Coalition (from May 15); SLFP; CCP (Pro-Soviet); LSSP	JVP	South Asia
Indo-Pakistani War of 1971	December 3, 1971	December 16, 1971	Pakistan; Supported by: United States; United Kingdom; China; Jordan; Iran; Saudi Arabia; Ceylon; Libya	Provisional Government of Bangladesh; India; Supported by: Soviet Union; Israel	South Asia
1970s operation in Balochistan	February 1973	December 1978	Pakistan Supported by: Iran; United States	Baloch separatists Supported by: Republic of Afghanistan; India; Iraq; Soviet Union (from 1974)	South Asia
1973 Uruguayan coup d'état	June 27, 1973	June 28, 1973	(Uruguay) Uruguayan Civic-military regime	General Assembly of Uruguay	South America
1973 Chilean coup d'état	September 11, 1973	September 11, 1973	Chilean Armed Forces: (Chile) Chilean Army; Chilean Navy; (Chile) Chilean Air Force; Carabineros de Chile; Supported by: United States	(Chile) Chilean Government: Popular Unity; GAP; MIR	South America
Armed resistance in Chile (1973–90)	September 11, 1973	March 11, 1990	Military dictatorship of Chile: Chilean Armed Forces; Carabineros de Chile; United States	Guerrillas: MIR; FPMR; MAPU Lautaro; MIR-EGP-PL	South America
Yom Kippur War	October 6, 1973	October 25, 1973	Israel; Supported by: United States	Egypt; Syria; Expeditionary forces: Saudi Arabia; Algeria; Jordan; Sudan; Iraq; Libya; Kuwait; Tunisia; Morocco; Cuba; Supported by: Soviet Union; East Germany; North Korea; Pakistan; Lebanon	Western Asia
Carnation Revolution	April 24, 1974	April 25, 1974	Portuguese Estado Novo regime (isolationist, mostly unsupported)	Armed Forces Movement (MFA) (an organization of military officers who opposed the authoritarian Estado Novo regime, joined by a popular civil resistance campaign)	Western Europe
Ongoing Revolutionary Process	April 25, 1974	November 25, 1975	National Salvation Junta (After the failed March 11, 1975 coup by Spínola, reformed into:) Revolutionary Council's moderates	Communist armed forces revolutionaries, mostly led by Otelo Saraiva de Carvalho & Vasco Gonçalves.	Western Europe
Ethiopian Civil War	November 28, 1974	May 21, 1991	EPRDF: TPLF; EPDM; EPRP; MEISON (from 1977); EDU; OLF; WSLF; ALF; ONLF; Eritrean separatists: ELF (until 1981); EPLF; Supported by: Libya; Somalia; Syria; Iraq; Saudi Arabia	Derg (1974–1987); PDR Ethiopia (1987–1991); MEISON (until 1977); Supported by: Soviet Union (1974–1990); Cuba (1974–1990); South Yemen (1974–1990); North Korea; Israel (from 1990)	Eastern Africa
Operation Independence	February 5, 1975	September 28, 1977	Argentina	ERP; Montoneros	South America
Lebanese Civil War	April 13, 1975	October 13, 1990	Israel; Lebanese Front; Army of Free Lebanon; South Lebanon Army; Tigers Militia Lebanese Armed Forces; UNIFIL	Lebanese National Movement; Jammoul; Lebanese Communist Party; Syrian Social Nationalist Party in Lebanon; PLO Syria (1976, 1983–1991); Amal Movement; PNSF; Arab Deterrent Force	Near East
Angolan Civil War	November 11, 1975	April 4, 2002	UNITA; FNLA; South Africa; Zaire FLEC	MPLA; Cuba; Brazil; SWAPO; ANC; Executive Outcomes; FLNC; Namibia	Southern Africa
Indonesian invasion of East Timor	December 7, 1975	July 17, 1976	Indonesia	East Timor: FRETILIN (FALINTIL)	Southeast Asia
Operation Entebbe	July 4, 1976	July 4, 1976	Israel; Supported by: Kenya	PFLP-EO; Revolutionary Cells; Uganda	Western Africa
1976 Argentine coup d'état	March 24, 1976	March 24, 1976	Armed Forces of the Argentine Republic: Army; Navy; Air Force; Supported by: United States	Government of Argentina: Justicialist Party	South America
Islamist uprising in Syria	May 31, 1976	February 28, 1982	Muslim Brotherhood; Pro-Iraqi Ba'athists; Supported by: Iraq (1980–1982); West Germany; Jordan	(Syria) Syrian government: Ba'ath Party; Supported by: Soviet Union	Western Asia
Insurgency in Aceh	December 4, 1976	August 15, 2005	Indonesia; Supported by: United States	Free Aceh Movement; Supported by: Libya	Southeast Asia
Shaba I	March 8, 1977	May 26, 1977	Zaire; Morocco; Egypt; France; Belgium	Front for the National Liberation of the Congo	Central Africa
Mozambican Civil War	May 30, 1977	October 15, 1992	RENAMO; PRM (merged with RENAMO in 1982); FUMO; Rhodesia; South Africa	Mozambique (People's Republic until 1990): FRELIMO; UNAMO (after 1988); ZANU; Zimbabwe; Tanzania; Malawi	Southern Africa
1977 Seychelles coup d'état	June 4, 1977	June 5, 1977	SDP Government	SPUP Insurgents	East Africa
Operation Fair Play	July 5, 1977	July 5, 1977	Pakistan Army: Pakistan National Alliance	Government: Pakistan People’s Party	South Asia
Ogaden War	July 13, 1977	March 15, 1978	Somalia; WSLF Supported by: United States; Egypt; Saudi Arabia; Iraq; Iran; Jordan; China	Ethiopia; Cuba; Soviet Union; South Yemen Supported by: Israel; East Germany; North Korea	Eastern Africa
Egyptian–Libyan War	July 21, 1977	July 24, 1977	Egypt	Libya	North Africa
Shaba II	May 11, 1978	June 1978	Zaire; France; Belgium; Morocco; United States	Front for the National Liberation of the Congo	Central Africa
Korean Air Lines Flight 902	April 20, 1978	April 20, 1978	South Korea	Soviet Union	Northern Europe
Uganda-Tanzania War	October 9, 1978	June 3, 1979	Uganda	Tanzania	Eastern Africa
Cambodian–Vietnamese War	December 21, 1978	September 26, 1989	Democratic Kampuchea; CGDK/NGC (1982–1990): Khmer Rouge; KPNLF; FUNCINPEC; China; Thailand	Vietnam; FUNSK; People's Republic of Kampuchea; State of Cambodia	Southeast Asia
Iranian Revolution	January 16, 1979	February 1979	Imperial State of Iran	Revolution Council; Interim Government	Southern Asia
Sino-Vietnamese War	February 17, 1979	March 16, 1979	China	Vietnam; Supported by: Soviet Union	Southeast Asia
March 13th Revolution of 1979	March 13, 1979	March 13, 1979	Grenada	NJM	Caribbean
Salvadoran Civil War	May 9, 1979	January 16, 1992	Salvadoran government United States	FMLN (CRM): FDR; FPL (BLP, LP-28); RN (FAPU); PRTC (MLP); PCES	Central America
Soviet–Afghan War	December 24, 1979	February 15, 1989	Sunni Mujahideen; Supported by: Pakistan; Saudi Arabia; United States; United Kingdom; China; West Germany; Egypt; Israel Shia Mujahideen; Supported by: Iran Marxist–Leninist-Maoist rebels	Soviet Union; Afghanistan; East Germany	Central Asia

== Since 1980s ==
Conflict	Start date	End date	Western Bloc related	Eastern Bloc related	Region
Internal conflict in Peru	May 17, 1980	1999/Present	Peru	Shining Path; Militarized Communist Party of Peru; Túpac Amaru Revolutionary Movement	South America
Gwangju Uprising	May 18, 1980	May 27, 1980	South Korea	Demonstrators	Eastern Asia
Iran–Iraq War	September 22, 1980	August 20, 1988	Iraq: NCRI; DRFLA	Iran: KDP; PUK; Kurdish Mujahideen; ISCI; Islamic Dawa Party; Hezbollah	Persian Gulf
Ugandan Bush War	October 6, 1980	March 1986	(Uganda) Ugandan government	(Uganda) National Resistance Movement	Uganda
Somali Civil War (first phase)	1981/1988	January 27, 1991	(Somalia) USC; SNM; SSDF; SPM	(Somalia) Somali Democratic Republic: SNA	Eastern Africa
Falklands War	April 2, 1982	June 14, 1982	United Kingdom	Argentina	South America
1982 Ethiopian–Somali Border War	June 23, 1982	August 3, 1982	Somalia	Ethiopia; SSDF	Eastern Africa
Korean Air Lines Flight 007	September 1, 1983	September 1, 1983	South Korea	Soviet Union	Eastern Asia
Invasion of Grenada	October 25, 1983	December 15, 1983	United States; Caribbean Peace Force	Grenada	Caribbean
People Power Revolution	February 22, 1986	February 25, 1986	Government	Opposition: UNIDO	Southeast Asia
1986 United States bombing of Libya	April 15, 1986	April 15, 1986	United States	Libya	North Africa
1987–1989 JVP insurrection	April 15, 1987	December 29, 1989	Sri Lanka; India; Special training: United Kingdom; Arms suppliers: France; Israel; Pro-government paramilitaries: Eagles of the Central Hills; Black Cats; ... and others; Anti-JVP leftist militias: People's Revolutionary Red Army; Vikalpa Kandayama	Janatha Vimukthi Peramuna: Deshapremi Janatha Viyaparaya; Patriotic People's Armed Troops; Supported by: Soviet Union; East Germany; Iraq; North Korea; Cuba; Multiple Tamil militant organizations	South Asia
Brașov rebellion	November 15, 1987	November 15, 1987	Worker rebellion	Romania	Central Europe
8888 Uprising	March 12, 1988	September 21, 1988	Pro-democracy Opposition	Government: Burma Socialist Programme Party; Tatmadaw; Burma Police Force	Southeast Asia
Afghan Civil War	February 15, 1989	April 27, 1992	Mujahideen; Supported by: Pakistan: Inter-Services Intelligence; United States; Saudi Arabia; Iran; United Kingdom	Afghanistan	Central Asia
Revolutions of 1989	March 9, 1989	April 27, 1992	Democratic Movement	Eastern Bloc and Dictatorship	Central/Eastern Europe
Tiananmen Square protests of 1989	April 15, 1989	June 4, 1989	Beijing Students' Autonomous Federation; Beijing Workers' Autonomous Federation; Pro-democracy protesters Other opposition	Government of China	Eastern Asia
Velvet Revolution	November 17, 1989	December 29, 1989	Opposition: Civic Forum	Government	Central Europe
Mongolian Revolution of 1990	December 10, 1989	March 9, 1990	Protesters	Mongolian People's Republic: Mongolian People's Revolutionary Party	Central Asia
United States invasion of Panama	December 20, 1989	January 31, 1990	United States; Panamanian opposition	Panama	Central America
Romanian Revolution	December 16, 1989	December 25, 1989	Revolutionaries: Anti-communists; Communist Party dissidents; National Salvation Front	(Romania) Government: Securitate; Communist Party loyalists	Central Europe

== Since 1990s ==
Conflict	Start date	End date	Western Bloc related	Eastern Bloc related	Region
Gulf War	August 2, 1990	February 28, 1991	Kuwait; United States; United Kingdom; Saudi Arabia; Egypt; France	Iraq	Western Asia
Yugoslav Wars	March 31, 1991	November 12, 2001	Slovenia; Croatia; Croatian Republic of Herzeg-Bosnia; Republic of Bosnia and Herzegovina; NATO; KLA; UÇPMB	SFR Yugoslavia (Federal Republic of Yugoslavia) FR Yugoslavia; Republic of Serbian Krajina; Republika Srpska; AP Western Bosnia	Eastern Europe
1991 Soviet coup d'état attempt	August 19, 1991	August 21, 1991	(Soviet Union) All-Union Government of the USSR Russian Soviet Federative Socialist Republic: Supreme Soviet; Council of Ministers	(Soviet Union) State Committee on the State of Emergency: Taman Guards; Kantemir Division; Communist Party; KGB	Eastern Europe

== See also ==
- History of Communism (September 3, 1945 - December 31, 1992)
- List of wars 1945-1989
