= Communist revolution =

Type of revolution

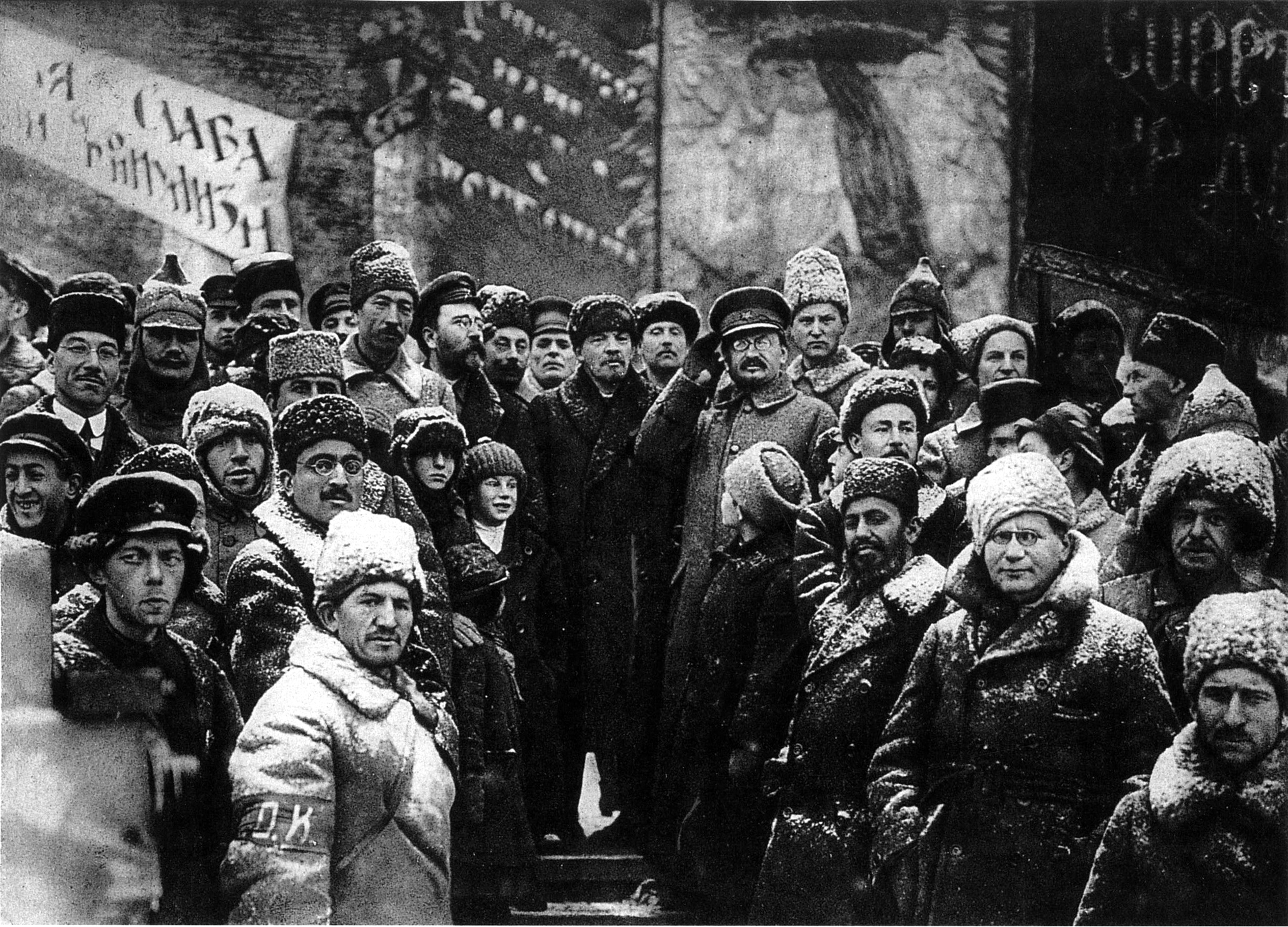
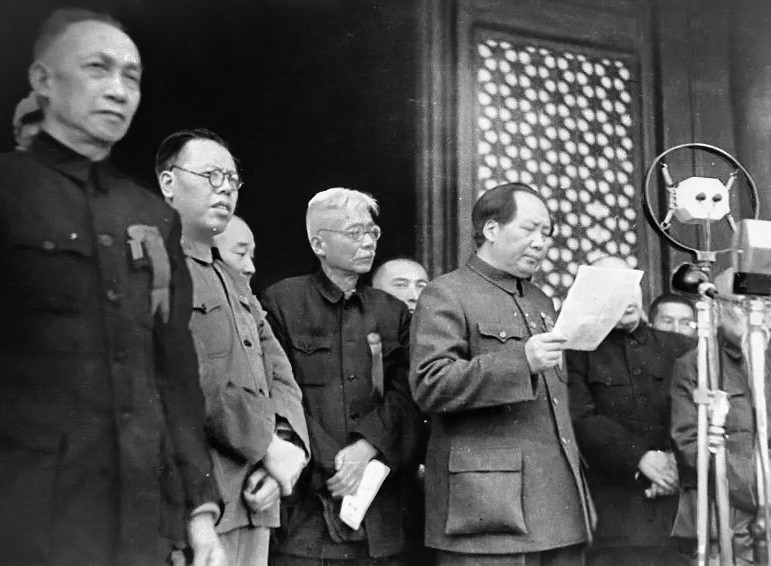
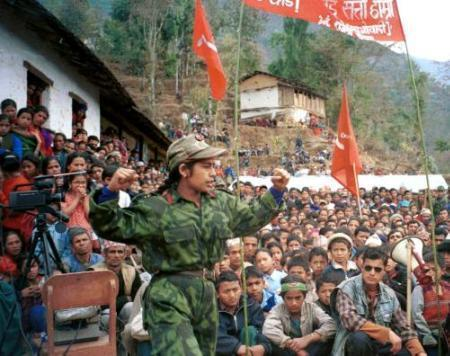
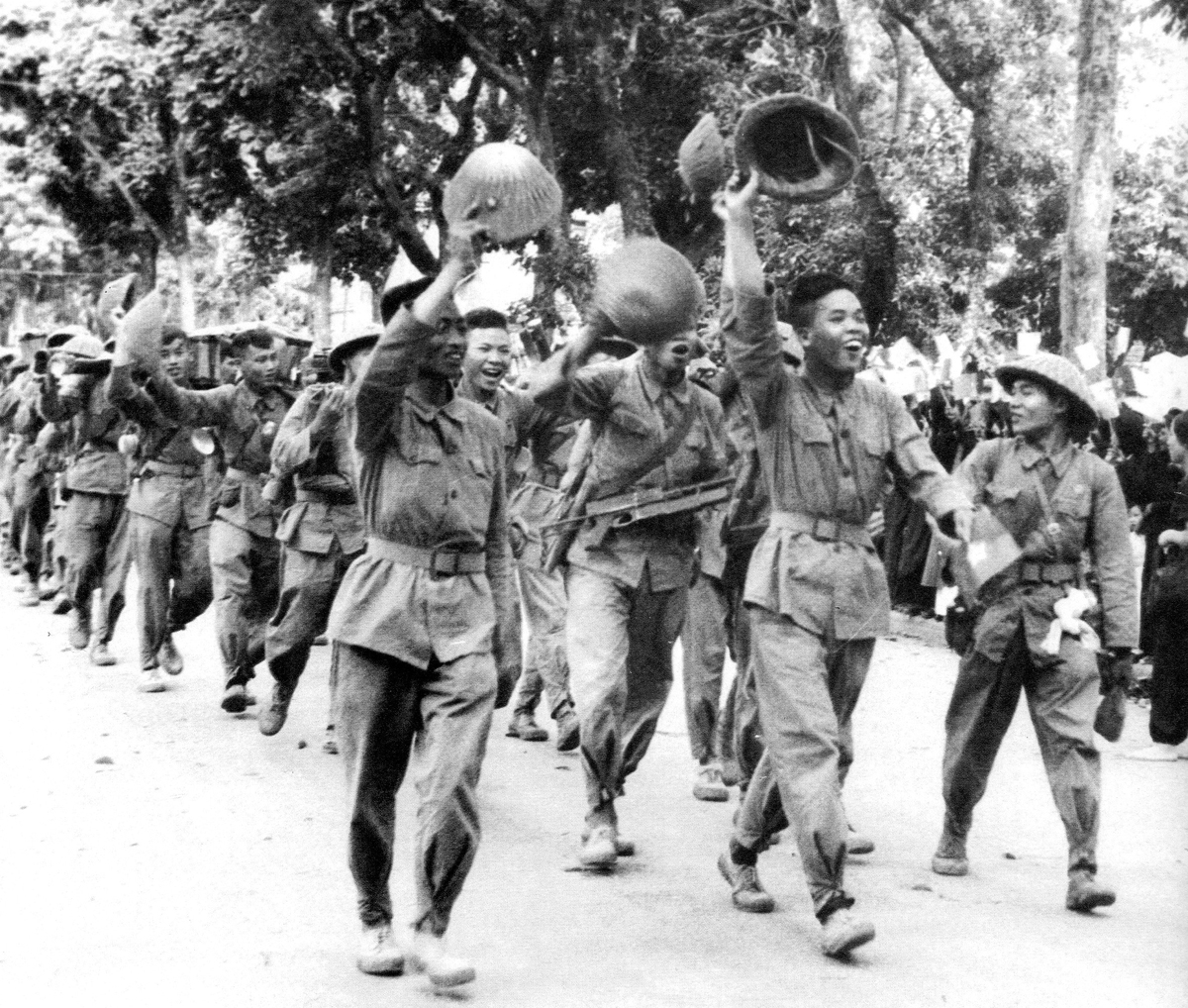
Clockwise from top left:
- Lenin, Trotsky and Kamenev celebrating the second anniversary of the October Revolution
- Mao Zedong and leading revolutionaries proclaim the People's Republic of China on 1 October 1949
- Viet Minh troops returning to Hanoi after the French withdrawal on 9 October 1954
- A Nepalese Maoist rebel speaks to villagers in the area around Piskar

A communist revolution is a proletarian revolution inspired by the ideas of Marxism that aims to replace a nation’s capitalist system with communism. Depending on the type of government, the term socialism can be used to indicate an intermediate stage between capitalism and communism and may be the goal of the revolution, especially in Marxist–Leninist views. The idea that a proletarian revolution is needed is a cornerstone of Marxism; Marxists contend that the workers of the world must unite and free themselves from capitalist production relations, establishing transitional workers' states that socializes the means of production and ultimately abolishing all class distinctions and the state itself to form a classless society. Thus, in the Marxist view, proletarian revolutions need to happen internationally.

== Theory ==
Karl Marx saw revolution as a necessity for communism, where the revolution would be based on class struggle led by the organised proletariat to overthrow capitalism and the bourgeoisie, followed by the establishment of a dictatorship of the proletariat.

Leninism argues that a communist revolution must be led by a vanguard of "professional revolutionaries", men and women who are fully dedicated to the communist cause and who can then form the nucleus of the revolutionary movement. Thus meaning that under Lenin's framework a communist revolution is not necessarily a proletarian revolution. Some Marxists, such as Rosa Luxemburg, disagree with the idea of a vanguard as put forth by Lenin, especially council communists. Another line of criticisms insist that the entire working class—or at least a large part of it—must be deeply involved and equally committed to the socialist or communist cause in order for a proletarian revolution to be successful. To this end, they seek to build massive communist parties with very large memberships.

== Communist revolutions and coups throughout history ==
The following is a list of successful and unsuccessful communist revolutions and coups throughout history. Success is measured solely by the successful overthrow of the existing order and does not imply an assessment whether the resulting order was in fact communist. Among the lesser-known revolutions, a number of borderline revolutions have been included which may or may not have been communist revolutions. The nature of unsuccessful revolutions is particularly contentious since one can only speculate as to the kinds of policies that would have been implemented by the revolutionaries had they achieved victory.

=== Successful ===
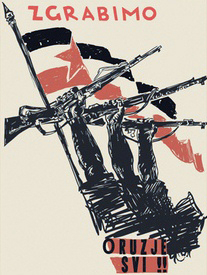
To arms, everyone!, a Yugoslav Partisan propaganda poster

- 1917–1923: The October Revolution and the subsequent Russian Civil War led to the establishment of the Soviet Union.
- 1921: The Mongolian Revolution ended Chinese occupation and White Russian influence over Mongolia and established the Mongolian People's Republic.
- 1927–1949: The Chinese Communist Revolution led to the establishment of the People's Republic of China and fleeing of the Republic of China to Taiwan.
- 1941–1945: The Yugoslav People's Liberation War led to the defeat of axis powers in the Balkans, abolishment of the Yugoslav monarchy, and the establishment of the Federal People's Republic of Yugoslavia.
- 1942–1945: The National Anti-Fascist Liberation Movement in Albania established the People's Socialist Republic of Albania.
- 1944: The Bulgarian coup d'état led to the immediate abolishment of the Bulgarian monarchy, followed soon after by the establishment of the People's Republic of Bulgaria.
- 1945: The August Revolution forced Emperor Bảo Đại to abdicate and established the Democratic Republic of Vietnam.
- 1946–1954: First Indochina War
- 1948: Czechoslovak coup d'état.
- 1953–1959: The Cuban Revolution overthrew the dictatorship of Fulgencio Batista, reestablishing the Republic of Cuba as a socialist state.
- 1955–1975: Vietnam War
- 1959–1975: Laotian Civil War
- 1961–1974: Angolan War of Independence
- 1961–1979: The Nicaraguan Revolution sees the Sandinistas oust the Somoza government.
- 1963: Les Trois Glorieuses in Congo-Brazzaville.
- 1968–1975: Cambodian Civil War
- 1969: The Corrective Move in South Yemen.
- 1969: The Somali coup d'état led to the formation of the Somali Democratic Republic.
- 1972: Mathieu Kérékou leads a military coup in Benin, leading to the creation of the People's Republic of Benin.
- 1974: Carnation Revolution (while the revolution overthrew the Estado Novo and created a governing alliance between army captains and the Communists, the demands for a workers' democracy were quashed by a new coup on 25 November 1975 that installed a minority government of the center-left Socialist Party with the backing of the United States and its Western allies)
- 1974: The 1974 Ethiopian coup d'état.
- 1978: The Saur Revolution leads to the establishment of the Democratic Republic of Afghanistan and the start of the Afghan conflict.
- 1979: The New JEWEL Movement overthrow's Eric Gairy's government in Grenada, creating the People's Revolutionary Government.
- 1983: The Upper Voltan coup d'état led by Thomas Sankara and Blaise Compaoré. Upper Volta was renamed Burkina Faso. Compaoré later led the 1987 Burkina Faso coup d'état, which killed Sankara and reversed his far-left policies.
- 1996–2006: Nepalese Civil War.

=== Unsuccessful ===
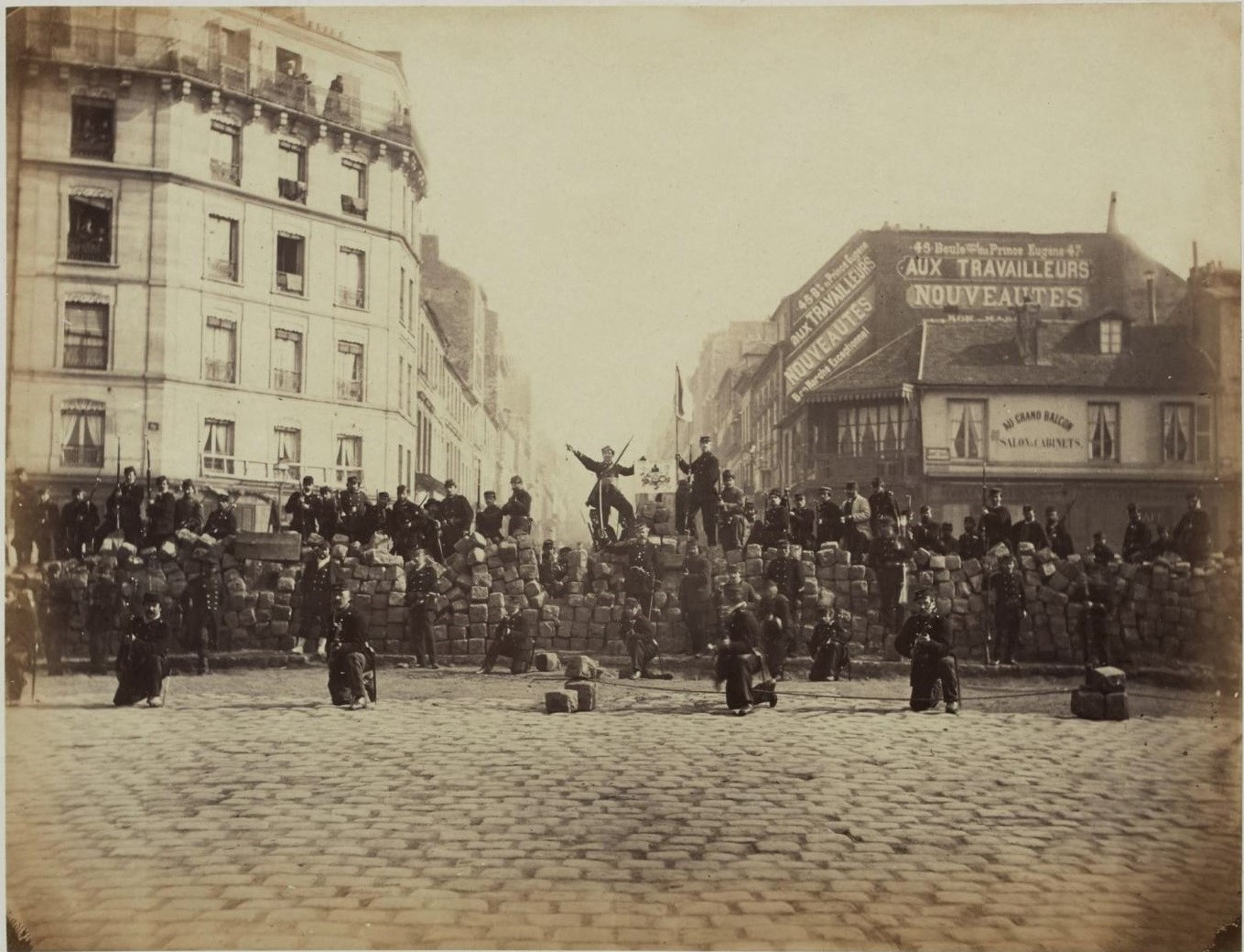
A barricade thrown up by Communard National Guard on 18 March 1871 during the Paris Commune.

- 1871: Paris Commune
- 1915–1920: Jungle Movement of Gilan
- 1916: Easter Rising
- 1918: Finnish Civil War
- 1918–1925: Canadian Labour Revolt
- 1918: Aster Revolution
- 1918–1919: German Revolution of 1918–19
- 1918: Red Week
- 1918: Luxembourg communist revolution
- 1918–1920: Estonian War of Independence
- 1919–1923: Irish soviets

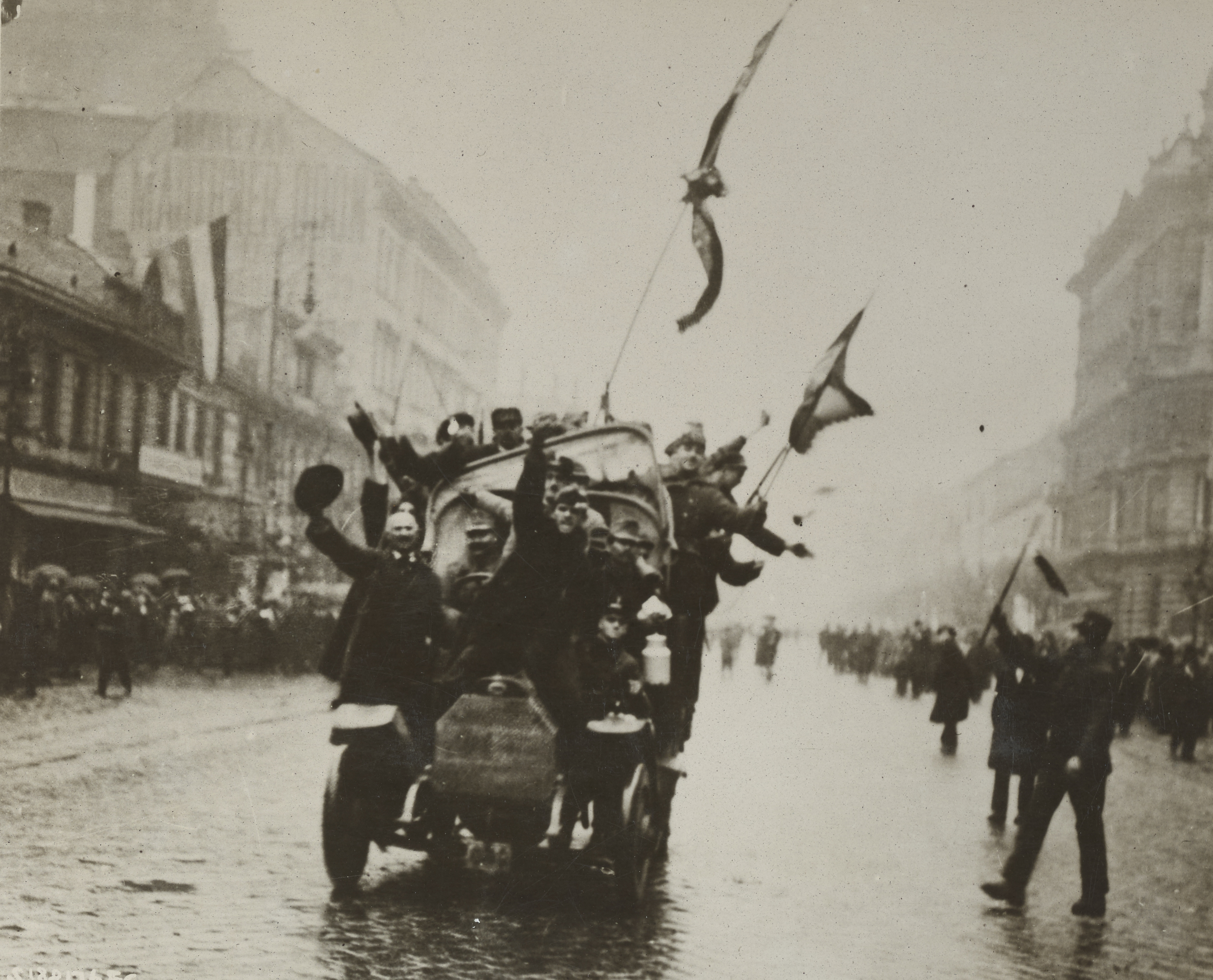
Communists driving through the streets of Budapest after the proclamation of the Hungarian Soviet Republic.

- 1919: Hungarian Soviet Republic
- 1919: Bender Uprising
- 1920: Georgian coup attempt
- 1921: Proština rebellion

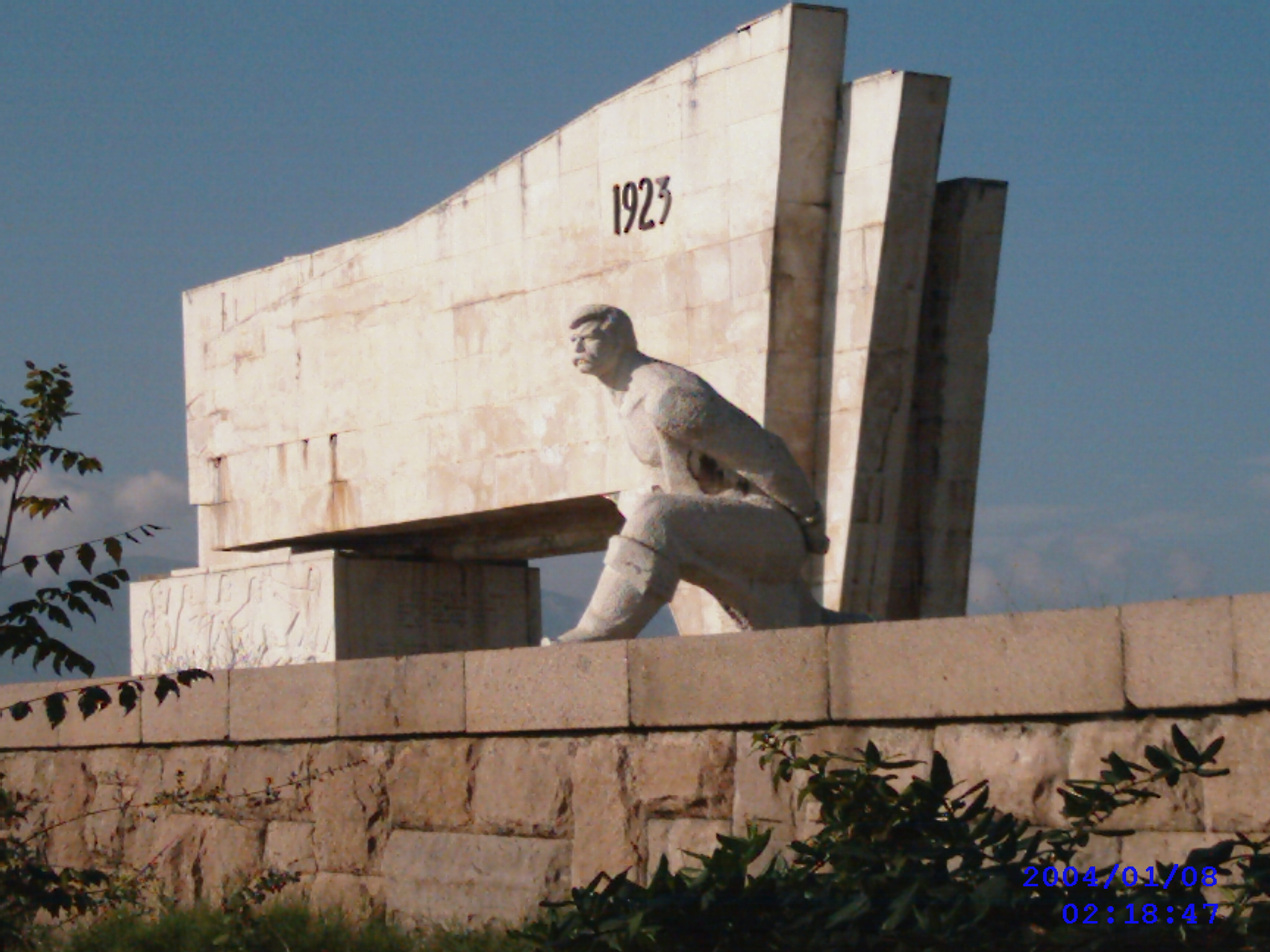
Memorial erected to the September Uprising.

- 1923: September Uprising
- 1923: Hamburg Uprising
- 1924: Tatarbunary Uprising
- 1924: Estonian coup d'état attempt
- 1932: 1932 Salvadoran peasant uprising
- 1935: Brazilian communist uprising
- 1936–1937: Spanish Revolution of 1936
- 1942–1954: Hukbalahap Rebellion
- 1945: Saigon Commune
- 1946–1954: Hukbalahap rebellion
- 1946–1949: Greek Civil War
- 1946–1951: Telangana Rebellion
- 1948–1949: Jeju uprising
- 1948–1989: Communist insurgency in Burma
- 1948–1960: Malayan Emergency
- 1948: Madiun Affair
- 1960–1996: Guatemalan Civil War
- 1962–1990: Communist insurgency in Sarawak
- 1965–1983: Communist insurgency in Thailand
- 1968–1989: Communist insurgency in Malaysia
- 1970: Teoponte Guerrilla
- 1971: JVP insurrection
- 1971: Sudanese coup d'état

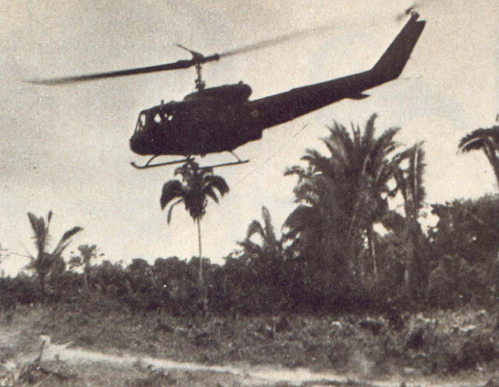
A Bell UH-1 Iroquois helicopter of the Brazilian Air Force conducting anti-communist operations in Araguaia.

- 1972–1974: Araguaia Guerrilla War
- 1975: 7 November 1975 Bangladeshi coup d'état
- 1979–1992: Salvadoran Civil War
- 1982: Amol uprising
- 1987–1989: JVP insurrection
- 2021–2023: Eswatini protests

=== Ongoing ===
- 1964–present: Colombian conflict
- 1967–present: Naxalite–Maoist insurgency
- 1969–present: New People's Army rebellion and communist armed conflicts in the Philippines
- 1972–present: Maoist insurgency in Turkey
- 1980–present: Internal conflict in Peru
- 1990–present: DHKP/C insurgency in Turkey
- 1993–present: Insurgency in Ecuador
- 2021–present: Myanmar civil war (2021–present)

=== Table of revolutions ===
Start date	End date	Duration	Event(s)	State	Rebel group	Revolutionary base area	Deaths	Result	Notes
18 March 1871	28 May 1871	(72 days)	Paris Commune	France	Communards; National Guards	Paris	7,544 killed overall	Revolt suppressed: Disbanding the Second National Guard by the French government	
1 October 1915	5 June 1920	(4 years, 249 days)	Jangal Movement	Qajar Iran	Jangal revolutionaries	Gilan province		Establishment of the Persian Socialist Soviet Republic	(Note: The Persian Socialist Soviet Republic was invaded and reincorporated into Qajar Iran in November 1921.)
24 April 1916	29 April 1916	(6 days)	Easter Rising	United Kingdom of Great Britain and Ireland	(Irish Republic) Irish rebel forces: Irish Citizen Army	Dublin	485 killed	Unconditional surrender of rebel forces, execution of most leaders.	(Note: While not explicitly Communist in Nature, the Easter Rising of 1916 was supported by Marxist groups such as the Irish Citizen Army.)
7 November 1917	7 November 1917	(1 day)	October Revolution	Russia	Bolsheviks; Petrograd Soviet; Left SRs; Red Guards; Anarchists	Petrograd	Few wounded Red Guard soldiers	Bolshevik victory Start of the Russian Civil War	
27 January 1918	15 May 1918	(109 days)	Finnish Civil War	Finland	Finnish Reds; (Russian Socialist Federative Soviet Republic) Soviet Russia	Finland	38,300 killed	Finnish Whites victory	
2 August 1918	11 June 1925	(6 years, 314 days)	Canadian Labour Revolt	Canada	One Big Union; Communist Party of Canada	Canada		Failure of the revolt	
28 October 1918	31 October 1918	(4 days)	Aster Revolution	Austria-Hungary: Kingdom of Hungary	Hungarian National Council: Hungarian Social Democratic Party; Soldiers' Councils	Hungary		Revolutionary victory: Hungary terminated Austria-Hungary; End of the First World War in Hungary; Establishment of First Hungarian People's Republic	
29 October 1918	11 August 1919	(287 days)	German Revolution of 1918–19	German Empire (1918); German Republic (1918–1919)	Communist revolutionaries: SPD (until 9 Nov. 1918); USPD (from 9 Nov. 1918); Spartacus League; KPD; IKD; Revolutionary Stewards; FVdG; Soviet Republics: People's State of Bavaria (until March 1919); Bavarian Soviet Republic; Bremen Soviet Republic; Saxon Soviet Republic; Würzburg Soviet Republic; Alsace-Lorraine Soviet Republic	Various regions of Germany	150–196	Fall of the German Empire; Suppression of leftist uprisings, including the Spartacist uprising; End of the First World War; Establishment of the Weimar Republic	
9 November 1918	14 November 1918	(6 days)	Red Week	Netherlands	Faction of the Social Democratic Workers' Party			No revolution	
10 November 1918	14 January 1919	(66 days)	Luxembourg communist revolution	Luxembourg	Assorted communists, socialists, and liberals			French Army victory: Abdication of Marie-Adélaïde; 1919 Luxembourg referendum	
28 November 1918	2 February 1920	(1 year, 67 days)	Estonian War of Independence	Estonia	Estonian Worker's Commune; RSFSR; Red Latvian Riflemen		3,988+ killed	Treaty of Tartu: Independence of Estonia; Vidzeme gained by the Republic of Latvia	
29 January 1919	24 May 1923	(4 years, 116 days)	Irish soviets	United Kingdom of Great Britain and Ireland (1919–1921); Irish Free State (1921–1923)	Irish soviets	Ireland		Soviets shutdown; Majority of individuals involved arrested	(Note: The Irish soviets, declared during the revolutionary period of the Irish war of independence and the Irish civil war, which were defeated by the Irish Free State forces.)
23 March 1919	1 August 1919	(132 days)	Hungarian Soviet Republic (Note: Revolutions and interventions in Hungary (1918–1920); Hungarian–Romanian War)	Hungarian Republic	Hungarian Soviet Republic	Hungary	6,670 killed	Collapse of the Hungarian Soviet Republic; Romanian occupation of most of Hungary; Treaty of Trianon; Miklós Horthy takes power as Regent of Hungary	(Note: Led by Béla Kun, defeated after five months.)
27 May 1919	27 May 1919	(1 day)	Bender Uprising	Romania	Red Guards; Ukrainian SSR	Tighina	150	Romanian–French victory	
2 May 1920	3 May 1920	(2 days)	1920 Georgian coup attempt	(Georgia (country)) Democratic Republic of Georgia	(Russia) Georgian Bolsheviks	Georgia	Several killed	Government Victory: Treaty of Moscow signed	
1 March 1921	11 July 1921	(133 days)	Mongolian Revolution of 1921	Bogd Khanate of Mongolia; Outer Mongolia	Mongolian People's Party	Outer Mongolia		Mongolian communist victory: Collapse of the Bogd Khanate; End of Chinese control over Mongolia; Creation of the Mongolian People's Republic	
2 February 1921	5 April 1921	(63 days)	Proština rebellion	Italy	Civilians led by Ante Ciliga: Communist Party of Italy	Istria	Unknown	Government victory: Civilians arrested; Village of Šegotići burned to the ground	(Note: About 400 participants of the Proština rebellion were arrested and taken to the Pula remand prison. Fascists and soldiers beat and mistreated arrested the anti-fascists on the way, and several people died as a result of the beatings. Gradually, the anti-fascists were released from prison and later, in the context of the process of wider political amnesty, all were released.)
3 March 1921	8 April 1921	(37 days)	Labin mining strike and rebellion	Italy	Labin Republic	Istria	5	Government victory: Strike suppressed; Miners acquitted of crimes	(Note: The anti-fascist, socialist Labin Republic uprising in modern-day Labin, Croatia, which pushed out Mussolini's fascist forces and established a socialist society in the city and surrounding towns.)
14 September 1923	29 September 1923	(16 days)	September Uprising	Bulgaria	BCP; BZNS; Anarchists		841 killed	Bulgarian government victory: Rebellion crushed; rebels withdraw to the Balkan Mountains	
23 October 1923	24 October 1923	(2 days)	Hamburg Uprising	Weimar Republic	Communist Party of Germany	Hamburg	99 killed	Government victory	
15 September 1924	18 September 1924	(4 days)	Tatarbunary Uprising	Romania	Tatarbunary Revolutionary Committee	Tatarbunary	3,000 killed	Revolt quelled by the Romanian government	
1 December 1924	1 December 1924	(1 day)	1924 Estonian coup attempt	Estonia	Communist Party of Estonia		151 killed	Estonian government victory	
1 August 1927	1 October 1949	(22 years, 62 days)	Chinese Civil War; Chinese Communist Revolution	China	Chinese Communist Party: Chinese Workers' and Peasants' Red Army (1927–1937); People's Liberation Army (1946–1950)	Communist-controlled China	cca. 8 million	Communist victory: Beginning of the Cross-Strait conflict	(Note: The Chinese Communist Revolution was the final stage of the Chinese Civil War, that resulted in the victory of the Chinese Communist Party in China in 1949.)
22 January 1932	February 1932	(11 days)	1932 Salvadoran peasant uprising	Republic of El Salvador	Communist Party of El Salvador; Pipil rebels	Western El Salvador: Ahuachapán; La Libertad; Santa Ana; Sonsonate	10,000 – 40,000	Revolt suppressed, ethnocide of Pipil people	(Note: The uprising, known as La matanza (the slaughter), was a Pipil and peasant rebellion led by Farabundo Martí.)
23 November 1935	27 November 1935	(5 days)	Brazilian communist uprising of 1935	Brazil	National Liberation Alliance: Brazilian Communist Party	Natal, Recife, and Rio de Janeiro	150+ killed	Government victory	
19 July 1936	25 May 1937	(311 days)	Spanish Revolution of 1936	Spain	CNT-FAI UGT	Various regions of Spain – primarily Madrid, Catalonia, Aragon, Andalusia, and parts of Levante, Spain.		Suppressed after ten-month period.	
22 June 1941	29 November 1945	(4 years, 161 days)	Yugoslav People's Liberation War	Yugoslavia	Yugoslav Partisans		850,000–1,200,000	Yugoslav Partisan–Allied victory: Defeat of Nazi Germany and Fascist Italy in the Balkans; Defeat and overthrow of the Independent State of Croatia, Government of National Salvation, Chetniks, and other Axis collaborators; Communist-led Partisans abolish the Yugoslav Serb monarchy; Establishment of Federal People's Republic of Yugoslavia under the rule of Josip Broz Tito	
29 March 1942	2 September 1945	(3 years, 158 days)	Hukbalahap Rebellion (First phase)	Japan: Philippines	Hukbalahap	Central Luzon		Huk victory: End of the Japanese occupation in 1945; Tension rises between the U.S-backed government and the Huks; Rebellion resumes in 1946	
16 September 1942	August 1945	(2 years, 320 days)	National Liberation Movement	Albanian Kingdom	National Anti-Fascist Liberation Movement	Albania		Establishment of the People's Socialist Republic of Albania	
9 September 1944	9 September 1944	(1 day)	1944 Bulgarian coup d'état	Bulgaria	Fatherland Front: BCP; NOVA; BZNS			Fatherland Front victory: Abolishment of the monarchy on 8 September 1946; Establishment of the People's Republic of Bulgaria on 15 September 1946.	
16 August 1945	30 August 1945	(15 days)	August Revolution	Empire of Vietnam	Việt Minh	Northern, Central and Southern Vietnam		Việt Minh victory: Abdication of Emperor Bảo Đại; Abolishment of the Vietnamese monarchy; Establishment of the Democratic Republic of Vietnam	
6 September 1945	25 June 1950	(4 years, 293 days)	Korean Revolution (Note: The period from the end of Chōsen, through the socialist People's Republic of Korea and the foundation of Democratic People's Republic of Korea, to the beginning of the Korean War.)	Provisional Government of the Republic of Korea	Communist Party of Korea (1945–1946); New People's Party of Korea (1946–1946); Workers' Party of South Korea (1946–1949); Workers' Party of North Korea (1946–1949); Workers' Party of Korea (from 1949)			Proclamation of the Democratic People's Republic of Korea in 1948; Start of the Korean War	(Note: As of 1992, the Democratic People's Republic of Korea no longer prescribes to Marxism–Leninism, and as of 2009 is no longer a communist state.)
31 March 1946	30 August 1949	(3 years, 153 days)	Greek Civil War	Kingdom of Greece	Provisional Democratic Government (from 1947): Democratic Army (from December 1946); Communist Party of Greece and allies; Ex-EAM members and other communist guerrillas' local groups (March 1946 – December 1946); People's Civil Guard	Greece (with spillover into Albania)	80,000–158,000 total killed	Monarchist victory	
May 1946	17 May 1954	(8 years, 17 days)	Hukbalahap Rebellion (Second phase)	Republic of the Philippines	Communist Party of the Philippines: People's Liberation Army	Central Luzon	Nearly 6,000 killed	Philippine government victory: End of the rebellion; Capture of Luis Taruc in 1954; Beginning of communist insurgency in the Philippines in the 1960s	
4 July 1946	25 October 1951	(5 years, 114 days)	Telangana Rebellion	Hyderabad State (1946–1948) Union of India (1948–1951)	Telangana peasants Andhra Mahasabha; Communist Party of India			Withdrawal of rebellion: Dissolution of Hyderabad State; Dissolution of communes and guerrilla squads; Land reforms are enacted; Ban on the Communist Party of India lifted	
19 December 1946	1 August 1954	(7 years, 226 days)	First Indochina War	French Indochina	DR Vietnam: Việt Minh; Lao Issara (1945–1949); Pathet Lao (1949–1954) Khmer Issarak: United Issarak Front (1950–1954)		400,000–842,707 total killed	DR Vietnam-allied victory: 1954 Geneva Conference; Departure of the French from Indochina; State of Vietnam, Democratic Republic of Vietnam, Kingdom of Laos and Kingdom of Cambodia achieve independence; Vietnam was partitioned between North (controlled by the Việt Minh) and South (controlled by the State of Vietnam); Start of the Vietnam War	(Note: The defeat of the French at the Battle of Dien Bien Phu, 1954, and brought the Communist Party of Vietnam under Ho Chi Minh to power in North Vietnam. A victory followed closely by the protracted guerrilla warfare-dominated Vietnam War (1957–1975), which in turn led to the fall of Saigon and the driving-out of occupying United States military forces there, and the unification of North and South Vietnam by communist guerrilla forces into the Socialist Republic of Vietnam. The conflict drastically changed neighboring Laos and Cambodia.)
21 February 1948	25 February 1948	(5 days)	1948 Czechoslovak coup d'état	Czechoslovak Republic	Communist Party of Czechoslovakia; pro-communist faction of the Czechoslovak Social Democratic Workers' Party			Appointment of a communist-dominated government	
2 April 1948	16 April 1989	(41 years, 15 days)	Communist insurgency in Burma	Union of Burma (1948–1962); Socialist Republic of the Union of Burma (1962–1988); Union of Burma (1988–1989)	Communist Party of Burma (1948–1989); Communist Party (Burma) (1948–1978); Shan State Communist Party (1956–1958); Communist Party of Arakan (1962–1986)	Shan State	3,000+ killed	Burmese government victory	
3 April 1948	13 May 1949	(1 year, 41 days)	Jeju uprising	United States Army Military Government in Korea (until August 1948); South Korea (from August 1948)	Workers' Party of South Korea	Jeju Island	30,000–100,000 killed	Uprising suppressed	(Note: The Jeju uprising was notable for its extreme violence; between 14,000 and 30,000 people (10 percent of Jeju's population) were killed (with some reports from Korean officials reporting numbers killed as high as 100,000) and 40,000 fled to Japan.)
16 June 1948	31 July 1960	(12 years, 46 days)	Malayan Emergency	Federation of Malaya; Federated Malay States	Malayan Communist Party: Malayan National Liberation Army	British Malaya	11,107	British-allied victory: Independence of the Federation of Malaya on 31 August 1957; Insurgency continues	
18 September 1948	19 December 1948	(93 days)	Madiun Affair	Indonesia	People's Democratic Front: PKI; PS; PBI; SOBSI; Pesindo	Madiun	1,920+ killed	Rebellion suppressed	
26 July 1953	1 January 1959	(5 years, 160 days)	Cuban Revolution	Cuba	26th of July Movement; Student Revolutionary Directorate; Second National Front of Escambray	Sierra Maestra	3,000	26 July Movement victory: Overthrow of Fulgencio Batista's government; Establishment of a government led by Fidel Castro; Escambray rebellion	(Note: Nationalistic revolution led by Fidel Castro and Che Guevara which overthrew former president Fulgencio Batista and instated a Marxist–Leninist socialist regime later on in Cuba. Even though Batista had been elected for his first term, he achieved power for his second term through a coup d'état.)
1 November 1955	30 April 1975	(19 years, 181 days)	Vietnam War	South Vietnam	Viet Cong: People's Liberation Armed Forces of South Vietnam	Memot District (1966–72); Lộc Ninh (1972–75)	1,326,494–3,447,494	Communist victory	
23 May 1959	2 December 1975	(16 years, 194 days)	Laotian Civil War	Laos	Lao People's Party: Pathet Lao; North Vietnam	Xam Neua	20,000–62,000 killed	Pathet Lao and North Vietnamese victory: Establishment of the Lao People's Democratic Republic; End of the Kingdom of Laos; Small scale insurgency by anti-Pathet Lao factions	(Note: The Laotian Civil War resulting in the victory of the communist Pathet Lao/Lao People's Revolutionary Party in Laos by 1975, eliminating a coalition government with anti-communists led to the establishment of the communist-administered Lao People's Democratic Republic.)
13 November 1960	29 December 1996	(36 years, 47 days)	Guatemalan Civil War	Guatemala	URNG (from 1982): PGT (until 1998); MR-13 (1960–1971); FAR (1960–1971); EGP (1971–1996); ORPA (1979–1996)	Guatemala	Between 140,000 and 200,000 dead and missing (estimated)	Peace accord signed in 1996	
4 February 1961	25 April 1974	(13 years, 81 days)	Angolan War of Independence	Portuguese Angola	MPLA	Province of Angola	12,990+ killed	Angolan victory: Military stalemate; MPLA, FNLA, and UNITA political victory; Carnation Revolution; Alvor Agreement and Angolan independence in 1975	
19 July 1961	17 July 1979	(17 years, 364 days)	Nicaraguan Revolution	Nicaragua	FSLN: EPS; MAP-ML (1978–1979): MILPAS; Panama (1978–1979)	North Caribbean Coast Autonomous Region	30,000+ killed	FSLN military victory in 1979: Overthrow of Somoza government in 1979; Insurgency of the Contras; FSLN junta led by Daniel Ortega take power of Nicaragua in 1981; Electoral victory of FSLN in 1984	(Note: The Nicaraguan Revolution that overthrew the dictator Anastasio Somoza Debayle and brought the Sandinistas to power in Nicaragua from 1979 to 1990.)
c. December 1962	3 November 1990	(27 years, 338 days)	Communist insurgency in Sarawak	Malaysia	North Kalimantan Communist Party: North Kalimantan People's Army	Sarawak	400–500 killed	Government victory: Peace Declaration of Sri Aman in 1973; Dissolution of the Sarawak Communist Organisation/North Kalimantan Communist Party (SCO/NKCP).	
13 August 1963	15 August 1963	(3 days)	Trois Glorieuses	Congo	Congolese trade unions: Congolese Youth Union; Confédération générale aéfienne du travail; Armed Forces of the Republic of the Congo			Uprising successful: Fulbert Toulou ousted from power; Alphonse Massamba-Débat chosen as prime minister; National Revolution Movement formed as the single ruling party	(Note: Instability and the arresting of political opponents eventually led to left-wing protests and Massamba-Débat relinquishing power to Marien Ngouabi, who declared the People's Republic of the Congo under the control of the Congolese Workers' Party.)
27 May 1964	Present	(62 years, 166 days)	Colombian conflict	Colombia	ELN (1964–); FARC dissidents (2016–); EPL/Los Pelusos (1967–); FARIP (?–); FARC (1964–2017); ERP (1985–2007); CGSB (1987–1990); M-19 (1974–1990); MOEC (1964–1995); MAQL (1984–1991); ERC (1964–1992); ERG (1964–2008); PRT (1964–1991)	Colombia with spillovers into Venezuela	220,000+ killed	Ongoing: Colombia–FARC peace deal in 2016; Start of Catatumbo campaign in 2018	
1965	1983	(18 years, 1 day)	Communist insurgency in Thailand	Thailand	Communist Party of Thailand; Malayan Communist Party; Pathet Lao; Khmer Rouge (until 1978, 1979–1983)	Nakhon Phanom Province	6,762+ killed	Thai government victory: Amnesty declared on 23 April 1980 by the Thai government; Order 66/2523 signed by Prime Minister Prem Tinsulanonda; Communist insurgency declines and ends in 1983	
18 May 1967	Present	(59 years, 175 days)	Naxalbari uprising; Naxalite–Maoist insurgency	India	Communist Party of India (Maoist): People's Liberation Guerrilla Army	Red corridor	Since 1997: 13,060–14,552	Ongoing	(Note: The Maoist revolution of India happened in 1977. It was defeated by the Indian National Congress then led by Indira Gandhi.; In India, various Maoist-oriented factions (generally called Naxalites) have waged armed struggles since the Naxalbari rebellion of 1967. Today, the most prominent Naxalite group is the Communist Party of India (Maoist).)
17 June 1968	2 December 1989	(21 years, 169 days)	Communist insurgency in Malaysia	Malaysia	Malayan Communist Party: Malayan National Liberation Army	Malay Peninsula and Sarawak	367	Peace Agreement of Hat Yai signed: Dissolution of the Malayan Communist Party (MCP); Insurgency continues in Sarawak until 1990	
17 January 1968	17 April 1975	(7 years, 91 days)	Cambodian Civil War	Cambodia	Communist Party of Kampuchea: Khmer Rouge	Ratanakiri Province	275,000–310,000 killed	Communist victory	(Note: The civil war in Cambodia ended with the Khmer Rouge revolution in 1975. The Communist Party of Cambodia and Pol Pot then ruled the country until 1979.)
29 March 1969	Present	(57 years, 225 days)	New People's Army rebellion	Philippines	Communist Party of the Philippines: New People's Army	Samar	43,000+ killed (up to 2008) (63,973+ killed)	Ongoing	(Note: Maoist-styled "Protracted People's War" in the Philippines.)
22 June 1969	22 June 1969	(1 day)	Corrective Move	South Yemen	Marxist faction of the NLF		No deaths	Coup successful: Overthrow of Al-Shaabi and his allies; Nasserists purged from the National Liberation Front; South Yemen becomes a socialist state, with Salim Rubai Ali as president.	
21 October 1969	21 October 1969	(1 day)	1969 Somali coup d'état	(Somalia) Somali Republic	(Somalia) Supreme Revolutionary Council	Mogadishu		Supreme Revolutionary Council victory: Somali Republic deposed; Somali Democratic Republic established	
19 July 1970	1 November 1970	(106 days)	Teoponte Guerrilla	Bolivia	Guerrilla de Teoponte (Ejército de Liberación Nacional)	Teoponte Municipality		Bolivian government victory	
5 April 1971	June 1971	(62 days)	1971 JVP insurrection	Dominion of Ceylon	JVP: State of Augestan	Southern Province and Sabaragamuwa Province	Official: 1,200; Estimated: 4,000–5,000	Ceylonese government victory: Rebel leaders were captured and the remaining members surrendered; Ceylonese government re-established control of the entire island; Expulsion of North Korean diplomats	
19 July 1971	22 July 1971	(4 days)	1971 Sudanese coup d'état	Democratic Republic of Sudan	Revolutionary Council: Sudanese Communist Party; Rebel military units	Khartoum		Coup attempt fails: Nimeiry government restored; Anti-communist purges by government forces; Execution of rebelling officers; Execution of several Sudanese Communist Party leaders; Consolidation of Nimeiry's control	
April 1972	October 1974	(2 years, 214 days)	Araguaia Guerrilla War	Federative Republic of Brazil	Communist Party of Brazil	Goiás and Tocantins	90+ killed	Military dictatorship victory: Successful counter-insurgency operation; Guerrillas failed to gain popular support; Guerrilla forces exterminated	
24 April 1972	Present	(54 years, 199 days)	Maoist insurgency in Turkey	Turkey	Communist Party of Turkey/Marxist–Leninist: Liberation Army of the Workers and Peasants of Turkey; MKP-HKO-PHG	Tunceli Province		Ongoing	
25 April 1974	25 April 1974	(1 day)	Carnation Revolution	Estado Novo	Armed Forces Movement		5 deaths	Coup successful: Dissolution of the Estado Novo; Beginning of the Portuguese transition to democracy; End of the Portuguese Colonial War and independence of Angola, Cape Verde, Guinea-Bissau, Mozambique, and São Tomé and Príncipe; Indonesian invasion of East Timor; Far-left demands latterly quashed by the Socialist Party	
12 September 1974	12 September 1974	(1 day)	1974 Ethiopian coup d'état	Ethiopia	Coordinating Committee of the Armed Forces, Police and Territorial Army			Coup successful: Emperor Haile Selassie is placed under arrest and is taken to the Fourth Division Army headquarters; Derg suspends constitution; Beginning of the civil war	(Note: The overthrow of Haile Selassie by Mengistu Haile Mariam who then set up one-party Marxist–Leninist rule in Ethiopia by the communist Workers' Party of Ethiopia, until they were defeated and expelled by the revolutionary democratic and Hoxhaist Ethiopian People's Revolutionary Democratic Front during a subsequent civil war.)
7 November 1975	7 November 1975	(1 day)	7 November 1975 Bangladeshi coup d'état	Bangladesh	Jatiya Samajtantrik Dal; Biplobi Shainik Sangstha			Successful coup: Death of Khaled Mosharraf	(Note: After the new president, Ziaur Rahman, offered pay increases for the soldiers, most soldiers lost interest in the ideals of the revolution.)
27 April 1978	28 April 1978	(2 days)	Saur Revolution	Afghanistan	People's Democratic Party of Afghanistan	Afghanistan	2,000	PDPA victory: Overthrow and execution of Mohammed Daoud Khan and his family; Purging and killing of Daoud's supporters; Establishment of the Democratic Republic of Afghanistan; Eventual Soviet military intervention	(Note: They were overthrown by the mujahideen in 1992.)
13 March 1979	13 March 1979	(1 day)	New JEWEL Movement	Grenada	New JEWEL Movement			Installation of the People's Revolutionary Government	
15 October 1979	16 January 1992	(12 years, 94 days)	Salvadoran Civil War	El Salvador	FMLN: FPL (BLP, LP-28); ERP; RN (FAPU); PRTC (MLP); PCES		87,795+ killed	Chapultepec Peace Accords	(Note: The FMLN (mainly composed of Marxist–Leninist guerrilla groups) fought against the U.S. backed military government which suppressed the rebel movement by framing and mass murdering alleged Marxist–Leninist revolutionaries (El Mozote massacre). The FMLN was inspired by the ideologies of Farabundo Martí and Vladimir Lenin.)
17 May 1980	Present	(46 years, 176 days)	Internal conflict in Peru	Peru	Communist Party of Peru–Shining Path: People's Guerrilla Army; Militarized Communist Party of Peru Red Mantaro Base Committee Túpac Amaru Revolutionary Movement (1982–1997)	Ayacucho Region	70,000+ killed	Ongoing	(Note: The internal conflict in Peru comprised two rebellions by two different Marxist organizations. One, the Shining Path, fought a bloody war beginning in 1980 with successive Peruvian governments, both democratic and authoritarian in nature. Another organization, known as the Túpac Amaru Revolutionary Movement (MRTA), named after an Incan warrior Túpac Amaru began their own rebellion in 1982. The MRTA and Shining Path quickly became bitter enemies and fought one another as well as the government of Peru. Fighting goes on today with a small number of Shining Path cadres, however the movement has mostly been crushed and only operates in a very remote jungle region. The Tupac Amaru Revolutionary Movement was largely destroyed in 1997 after the Japanese embassy hostage crisis.)
25 January 1982	25 January 1982	(1 day)	1982 Amol uprising	Iran	Union of Iranian Communists (Sarbedaran)	Amol County	80–300 killed	Iranian government victory	
4 August 1983	4 August 1983	(1 day)	Upper Voltan coup d'état	Upper Volta	Left-wing armed forces faction led by Thomas Sankara and Blaise Compaoré		13 killed	Thomas Sankara installed as the President of Upper Volta; Formation of Burkina Faso	(Note: After the formation of Burkina Faso, Thomas Sanka led many socialist policy implementations. One example is the suppression of most of the powers held by tribal chiefs in Burkina Faso. The chiefs were stripped of their rights to tribute payments and forced labour as well as having their land distributed amongst the peasantry. Blaise Compaoré later led the 1987 Burkina Faso coup d'état, which killed Thomas Sankara and reversed his far-left policies.)
15 April 1987	29 December 1987	(259 days)	1987–1989 JVP insurrection	Sri Lanka	Janatha Vimukthi Peramuna: Deshapremi Janatha Viyaparaya; Patriotic People's Armed Troops		60,000–80,000 killed	Sri Lankan Government victory: Execution of Rohana Wijeweera; Emergency conditions in South-western and Central provinces lifted; Insurgency declined following the fall of the Eastern bloc	
1 April 1990	Present	(30 years, 269 days)	DHKP/C insurgency in Turkey	Turkey	DHKP/C; TKP/ML; MLKP; Communist Party of Turkey (Workers Voice) Syria (Until 2024)		70–100+ deaths		
13 February 1996	21 November 2006	(10 years, 282 days)	Nepalese Civil War	Nepal	Communist Party of Nepal (Maoist): People's Liberation Army, Nepal	Rapti Zone	17,800 killed overall	Comprehensive Peace Accord	(Note: The Maoist Unified Communist Party of Nepal fought a fairly successful revolutionary war against the autocratic King of Nepal. In 2006 peace was declared, and an agreement was reached that the Maoists would join an interim government.)
20 June 2021	June 2023	(2 years, 1 day)	2021–2023 Eswatini protests	Eswatini	Communist Party of Swaziland (CPS); People's United Democratic Movement (PUDEMO); Ngwane National Liberatory Congress (NNLC); Swazi Democratic Party (SWADEPA); Economic Freedom Fighters of Swaziland (EFFSWA); African United Democratic Party (AUDP); Mass Democratic Movement (MDM); Swaziland International Solidarity Forces		24+	Protests suppressed.	
August 2021	Present	(5 years, 100 days)	Myanmar civil war (2021–present)	Myanmar	People's Liberation Army (Myanmar); (Myanmar) National Unity Government; Brotherhood Alliance	Myanmar	45,264+ killed	Ongoing	
1 June 1993	Present	33 years, 161 days	Insurgency in Ecuador	Ecuador	GCP; PCE-SR; ELA; FARE; CAR (2005–2008); FARC dissidents (from 2018)	Ecuador	Unknown	Ongoing	

== See also ==
- Class conflict
- Communist state
- Communist society
- List of communist states
