= FDS =

FDS may refer to:

== Business ==
- Sarajevo Tobacco Factory (Bosnian: Fabrika duhana Sarajevo), a Bosnian tobacco company
- FactSet, an American financial data company
- Federated Department Stores, now Macy's, an American retailer
- Ferrovie della Sardegna, an Italian railway company

== Computing ==
- Famicom Disk System (Family Computer Disk System), a video game console add-on
- Functional Design Specification, a type of requirements document
- Fire Dynamics Simulator, modelling software

== Politics ==
- Democratic Social Front (Portuguese: Frente Democrática Social), a political party in Guinea-Bissau
- Democratic Socialist Front (French: Front Démocratique Socialiste), a political party in Gabon
- Federation of the Left (Italian: Federazione della Sinistra), a political coalition in Italy
- Force of the South (Italian: Forza del Sud), a defunct political party in Italy
- Salvadoran Democratic Front (Spanish: Frente Democrático Salvadoreño), a political organization active during the Salvadoran Civil War
- Sankarist Democratic Front (French: Front Démocratique Sankariste), a political party in Burkina Faso

== Other ==
- Federation of Drama Schools, a UK organisation of institutions that offer vocational drama training
- Foundation Degree in Science, one of the foundation level qualifications in higher education in the UK
- Formerly Used Defense Sites, properties that were under the jurisdiction of the United States Secretary of Defense
- r/FemaleDatingStrategy, a Reddit community

== See also ==
- FD (disambiguation)
