= PRTC =

PRTC may stand for:

- PEPSU Road Transport Corporation, a bus operator in Punjabi, India
- Potomac and Rappahannock Transportation Commission, a public bus service in Prince William County, Virginia
- Puducherry Road Transport Corporation, a Puducherry government public bus-service company
- Puerto Rico Telephone Company, a Puerto Rican telecommunication company; now América Móvil
- Revolutionary Party of Central American Workers (Spanish: Partido Revolucionario de los Trabajadores Centroamericanos, a political party in Central America
- Revolutionary Party of the Central American Workers – El Salvador (1980–1995), a left-wing political party in El Salvador
