= Revolutionary Mass Coordination =

Group of coordinated political demonstrations in El Salvador

The Revolutionary Mass Coordination (Spanish: Coordinadora Revolucionaria de Masas) was an alliance of revolutionary mass organizations in El Salvador formed on January 11, 1980. After existing for only three months, it merged into the Revolutionary Democratic Front on April 18.

The major action in its history was a January 22, 1980, demonstration, in commemoration of the 1932 Salvadoran peasant uprising. Between 200,000 and 350,000 people took to the streets this day in a country with just 5 million inhabitants. The security forces attacked the march with snipers located in the National Palace and other buildings in downtown San Salvador against the contingents of Frente de Acción Popular Unificado (United Popular Action Front) (FAPU) and Unión Democrática Nacionalista. The contingents of Bloque Popular Revolucionario and Ligas Populares 28 de Febrero (LP-28) had not yet begun to march when the demonstration was dissolved.

Later marches of the CRM were dispersed with particular dispatch by the National Guard, Hacienda Police, National Police and paramilitaries. The last big demonstration of the CRM occurred on March 24, 1980, during the funeral of Archbishop Óscar Romero, assassinated the week before. The repression of the march was brutal and the marchers began to leave the streets and the CRM devolved into a coordinating body of unions, student, farmer and worker groups. The last actions were during the general offensive of 1981 (la fallida).

Every organization in the CRM corresponded to a military-political organization.

- Bloque Popular Revolucionario, a mass front of Fuerzas Populares de Liberación “Farabundo Martí” founded on July 30, 1975
- Frente de Acción Popular Unificado (Unified Popular Action Front), mass front of Fuerzas Armadas de la Resistencia Nacional (National Resistance Armed Forces), founded in 1974
- Ligas Populares 28 de Febrero, (Popular League of February 28) mass front of Ejército Revolucionario del Pueblo. LP-28 was founded in March 1977, through the struggles against electoral fraud that year.
- Unión Democrática Nacionalista (National Democratic Union) was a legal political party launched by the Communist Party of El Salvador
- Movimiento de Liberación Popular (Popular Liberation Movement), mass front of Revolutionary Party of Central American Workers

Other organizations involved in the CRM were:

- Under FAPU:
  - Federación Nacional Sindical de Trabajadores Salvadoreños (FENASTRAS) (National Federation of Salvadoran Trade Unions).
  - Movimiento Revolucionario Campesino (MRC) (Farmers Revolutionary Movement)
  - Frente Universitario de Estudiantes Universitarios "Salvador Allende" (FUERSA) (Salvador Allende University Student Front).
  - Asociación Revolucionaria de Estudiantes de Secundaria (ARDES) (Revolutionary Association of Secondary Students).
  - Organización de Maestros Revolucionarios (OMR) (Organization of Revolutionary Teachers).
  - Vanguardia Proletaria (VP) (Proletariat Vanguard).
  - Sectores Comunales (SC) (Communal Sectors).
  - Movimiento de Intelectuales Revolucionarios (MIR) (Revolutionary Intellectuals Movement).
- Bloque Popular Revolucionario (BPR, creado en 1975 con grupos escindidos del FAPU).
  - Unión de Trabajadores del Campo (UTC).
  - Federación Cristiana de Campesinos Salvadoreños (FECCAS).
  - Asociación Nacional de Educadores Salvadoreños (ANDES 21 de junio).
  - Unión de Pobladores de Tugurios (UPT).
  - Movimiento de Estudiantes Revolucionarios de Secundaria (MERS).
  - Fuerzas Universitarias Revolucionarias "30 de Julio" (FUR-30).
  - Universitarios Revolucionarios "19 de julio" (UR-19).
  - Comité Coordinador de Sindicatos (CCS).
  - Movimiento de la Cultura Popular (MCP).
- Ligas Populares 28 de febrero (LP-28, fundadas en 1977).
  - Ligas Populares Campesinas (LPC).
  - Ligas Populares de Secundaria (LPS).
  - Ligas Populares Obreras (LPO).
  - Asociación de Usuarios y Trabajadores de los Mercados de El Salvador (ASUTRAMES).
  - Comités de Barrios LP-28.
- Unión Democrática Nacionalista (UDN, fundada en 1969).
  - Asociación de Estudiantes de Secundaria (AES).
  - Frente de Acción Universitaria (FAE).
  - Asociación de Trabajadores Agrícolas y Campesinos de El Salvador (ATACES).
  - Federación Unitaria Sindical Salvadoreña (FUSS).
  - Confederación Unitaria de Trabajadores Salvadoreños (CUTS).
  - Federación de Sindicatos de Trabajadores de la Industria del Alimento, Vestido, Textil, Similares y Conexos de El Salvador (FESTIAVSTCES).
- Movimiento de Liberación Popular (MLP, creado en 1979, antes conocido como Ligas para la Liberación o Liga para la Liberación).
  - Brigada de Trabajadores del Campo (BTC).
  - Comité de Bases Obreras (BCO).
  - Brigada Revolucionaria de Estudiantes de Secundaria (BRES).
  - Ligas para la Liberación (LL).
