= Revolutionary Democratic Front =

Revolutionary Democratic Front Frente Democrático Revolucionario
- Leader: Guillermo Ungo
- Founded: April 18, 1980; 46 years ago
- Dissolved: October 5, 1987; 39 years ago
- Merger of: Revolutionary Mass Coordination; Salvadoran Democratic Front
- Succeeded by: Democratic Convergence
- Youth wing: Young Communists of El Salvador
- Ideology: Communism; Left-wing nationalism; Anti-imperialism
- Political position: Far-left

Party flag
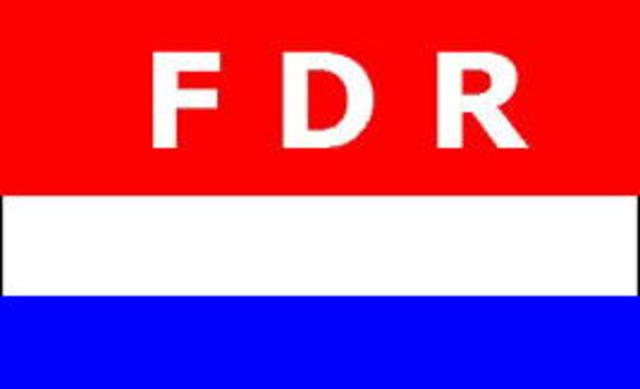

The Revolutionary Democratic Front (Spanish: Frente Democrático Revolucionario, FDR) was a coalition of mass organizations in El Salvador. It was aligned with the FMLN guerrilla movement in the Salvadoran Civil War. The FDR was formed in 1980, through the merger of the Salvadoran Democratic Front and the Revolutionary Mass Coordination, itself an alliance of the People's Revolutionary Bloc, the People's Liberation Movement, the February 28 Popular Leagues, the Unified Popular Action Front, and the Union of Democratic Nationalists. In 1987, the constituent organizations rebranded as Democratic Convergence and participated in politics legally for the first time in the 1991 election, receiving 12.16% of the vote.

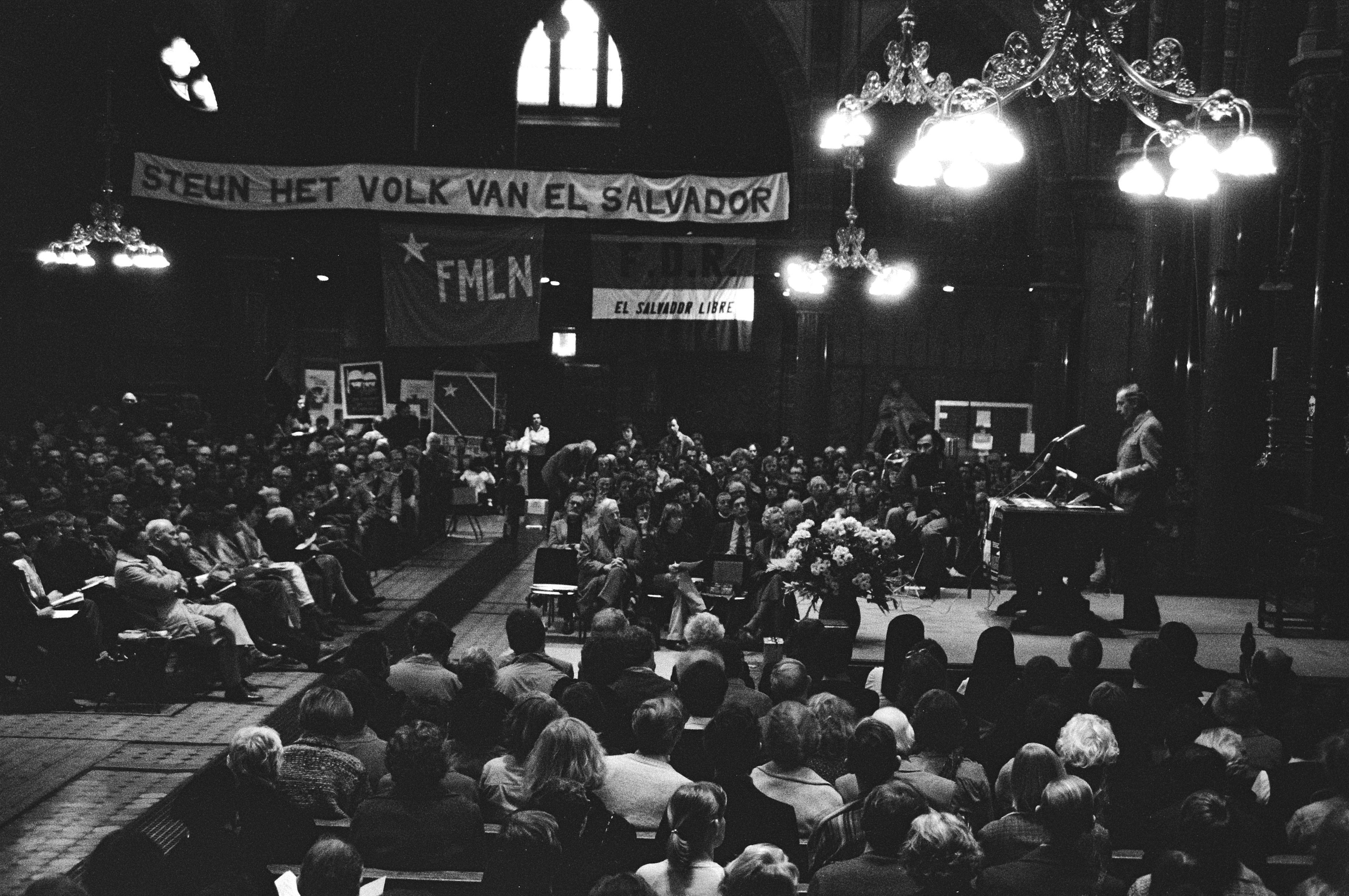
Commemoration in the Dominicus Church in Amsterdam that year ago Bishop Romero, human rights judge in El Salvador, was murdered, in the back Revolutionary Democratic Front.
