= Ana María =

Salvadoran revolutionary (1929–1983)

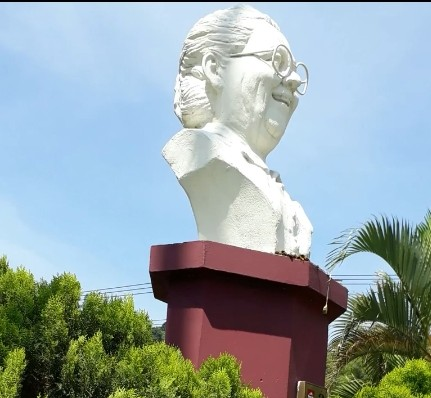
- Born: Mélida Anaya Montes; 17 May 1929; Santiago Texacuangos, El Salvador
- Died: 6 April 1983 (aged 53); Managua, Nicaragua
- Military career
- Allegiance: FMLN
- Commands: People's Liberation Forces
- Conflicts: Salvadoran Civil War

Ana María (17 May 1929 – 6 April 1983) was the nom-de-guerre of Dr. Mélida Anaya Montes, the second in command of the Fuerzas Populares de Liberación Farabundo Martí (FPL), the oldest of the five guerrilla organizations making up the FMLN, in El Salvador.

An intellectual, she was considered as an icon among revolutionary women in the region. Eventually she was killed by her own comrades on April 6, 1983, in Managua, Nicaragua.

Later, the FMLN blamed its leader Cayetano Carpio (sometimes referred to as the "Ho Chi Minh of Latin America") as the person responsible for the crime, and he committed suicide. Though he was not in Nicaragua at the time, many believe his stance created a situation that led Ana María's associates to assassinate her.

== Early life ==
She was born in the small town of Santiago Texacuangos, in the central zone of El Salvador. Ana María received her Doctorate of Education from the University of El Salvador, where she became a professor of education and gave classes in the 1960s. She was the assistant director of the Alberto Masferrer University.

In 1965, Anaya Montes founded the National Association of El Salvadorian Teachers (ANDES), also known as 21 de Junio, after its first demonstration in 1965. She led the strikes of educators in 1968 and 1971, which created major trouble for the government of general Fidel Sánchez Hernández.

In 1970, the ex-Secretary General of the Communist Party of El Salvador, Salvador Cayetano Carpio founded the first guerrilla detachment of El Salvador: the People's Liberation Forces Farabundo Martí (FPL).

== Assassination ==
The assassination of Mélida Anaya Montes was caused by a deep division that had developed within the FMLN. The majority, led by Ana María, favoured negotiation with the government. The hard line faction opposed any negotiation with the government of El Salvador, and supported a prolonged war. This faction was led by Commander Salvador Cayetano Carpio.

On 6 April 1983, at her home in Managua, Nicaragua, she was stabbed 83 times with an ice pick. Then, her neck was slashed. Nicaraguan authorities later apprehended the murderers and found them to be members of the FMLN. Rogelio Bazzaglia later confessed to Ana María's murder, stating he was under orders from Carpio, although later retracting it. Upon hearing the news that he was implicated in masterminding Ana María's murder, Carpio committed suicide in his home.

== Legacy ==
The Mélida Anaya Montes Language School in San Salvador, which uses popular education techniques highlights social justice issues, is named for her.

The Mélida Anaya Montes Women's Movement (MAM) was created in 1992 to defend women's rights.

== See also ==
- History of El Salvador
- Comandante Clelia
