= February 28 Popular Leagues =

Mass movement in El Salvador (1978–1980)

LP-28 poster

The February 28 Popular Leagues (Spanish: Ligas Populares 28 de Febrero, abbreviated LP-28) was a mass movement in El Salvador. LP-28 was launched in September 1977 by the People's Revolutionary Army (ERP), functioning as its mass front. The name referred to the February 28, 1977 massacre of ERP supporters, killed at Plaza Libertad in San Salvador during a protest against electoral fraud in the 1977 Salvadoran presidential election. LP-28 had some 5,000 to 10,000 members. Its following was largely based among peasants in Morazán Department. Leoncio Pichinte was the general secretary of LP-28.

== ERP and the formation of LP-28 ==
In the lead-up to the Salvadoran Civil War the mass mobilization of ERP was weaker than that of other guerrilla groups, as ERP had a more militaristic outlook. ERP had lost its previous mass front, the Unified Popular Action Front (FAPU), in an internal split in 1976. LP-28 was launched in response to the advances in mass organizations of its competitors among the guerrilla movements. In reaction to the electoral fraud and repression against the progressive sectors in the Catholic church, most of the Ecclesiastic Base Communities (CEB) in Morazán Department joined LP-28. In November 1977 the military forces had arrested and tortured Father Miguel Ventura in Morazan Department, but LP-28 organized mass protests in the area and managed to secure his release and allow Ventura to go into exile.

== 1979 coup ==
LP-28 took a militant stance against the October 15, 1979 coup d'état, taking actions to draw attention to the situation in El Salvador, such as occupations of embassy buildings, government installations and churches. LP-28, along with ERP, issued a call for a nation-wide insurrection. On October 29, 1979, government forces opened fire on an LP-28 rally in Morazán Department, killing 29 people.

== 1979 congress ==
The movement held its first congress on November 27, 1979, which affirmed the overthrow of the military junta and the establishment of a socialist society as the goals of the movement. The congress was baptized 'Irma Elena Contreras'. Some 3,000 LP-28 supporters attended the event. The meeting was addressed by guerrilla leader Ana Guadalupe Martínez Menéndez. The People's Revolutionary Bloc (BPR) sent a small delegation to the LP-28 congress. The BPR delegation was led by Juan Chacón, who in his intervention at the event made a call for unity. FAPU did not attend the LP-28 congress, as there was still hostility after the ERP killing of FAPU leader Roque Dalton.

== CRM and FDR ==
On January 11, 1980, LP-28, BPR and FAPU issued a joint call for insurrection. LP-28, BPR and FAPU organized a joint protest on January 22, 1980, which was met with violence from the state. Subsequently, LP-28, BPR and FAPU formed the Revolutionary Mass Coordination (CRM). CRM later merged into the Revolutionary Democratic Front (FDR), LP-28 was given one of seven slots in the FDR leadership - where it was represented by Pichinte.

== Member organizations ==
LP-28 was constituted by

- the "Heroes of October 29" Popular Peasant Leagues (Ligas Populares Campesinas "Héroes del 29 de octubre", LPC-28)
- the Secondary Students Popular Leagues "Edwin Arnoldo Contreras" (Ligas Populares Estudiantiles de Secundarias "Edwin Arnoldo Contreras", LPES)
- the Popular University Leagues "Mario Nelson Alfaro" (Ligas Populares Universitarias "Mario Nelson Alfaro", LPU)
- the Popular Workers Leagues "Marco Antonio Solís" (Ligas Populares Obreras "Marco Antonio Solís", LPO-28)
- the LP-28 Barrio and Colony Committees (Comités de Barrios y Colonias LP-28, CB-LP-28)
- the Association of Market Users and Workers of El Salvador (Asociación de Usuarios y Trabajadores de los Mercados de El Salvador, ASUTRAMES).

== In exile ==
LP-28 was present in Salvadoran diaspora, for example it had presence in Costa Rica.
