= Miguel Mármol =

20th-century Salvadoran left-wing activist; founder of the Communist Party of El Salvado

- Born: 4 July 1905; Ilopango, El Salvador
- Died: 23 June 1993 (aged 87); San Salvador, El Salvador
- Occupation: Shoemaker
- Known for: Founding the Communist Party of El Salvador
- Political party: Communist Party of El Salvador

Miguel Mármol (4 July 1905 – 23 June 1993) was a Salvadoran communist activist and the founder of the Communist Party of El Salvador.

== Biography ==
Miguel Mármol was born on 4 July 1905 in Ilopango, El Salvador. Mármol became a shoemaker, but when the October Revolution occurred in Russia, he began to have an interest in left-wing politics. In Ilopango, he met Agustín Farabundo Martí, a prominent left-wing Salvadoran activist, and together they founded the Society of Workers, Peasants and Fishermen of Ilopango (SCOPI), and they used the ideologies of Augusto César Sandino as a guide. On 30 March 1930, he founded the Communist Party of El Salvador.

On 22 January 1932, indigenous and communist peasants staged a revolution in El Salvador against the regime of President Maximiliano Hernández Martínez. The rebels took over large portions of western El Salvador and killed an estimated 100 people during the first day. In response, President Hernández Martínez ordered the Army to put down the uprising by force. The ensuing killings became known as La Matanza where anywhere from 10,000 to 40,000 people were killed. Agustín Farabundo Martí was executed following the uprising and Miguel Mármol was arrested. He was released and later rearrested and rereleased in 1934 while attempting to flee to Honduras. While he was incarcerated, the chief of police told him that was going to surely die. He remained in El Salvador and later became the president of the National Alliance of Shoemakers.

In 1947, Mármol left El Salvador for Guatemala. He was forced to flee back to El Salvador in 1954, however, due to the United States-backed coup which brought Carlos Castillo Armas to power. In 1988, Mármol recounted his escape from Guatemala in an interview with William Bollinger and Georg M Gugelberger:

I was number five on the execution list. But his [Carlos Castillo Armas] police could not capture me. I hid for two months in Guatemalan territory on my way to [El] Salvador. And I made it through without being assassinated. People say I must be protected by some witchcraft which allows me to go like a blind man through life. The police, of course, call me a red phantom because they could never catch or kill me.

— Miguel Mármol, 1988

Mármol participated in a steel workers' strike against the government of Julio Adalberto Rivera Carballo.

He fled El Salvador again on 13 July 1980 after receiving death threats from several Salvadoran death squads.

Mármol returned to El Salvador and died in San Salvador on 23 June 1993.

== See also ==
- Communist Party of El Salvador
