= Militares vermelhos =

Militares vermelhos (Portuguese for "red troops") was a term used for Portuguese military figures who were tied to the Portuguese Communist Party, or international communism, who were associated with the Movimento das Forças Armadas. The term was especially used by the populations of the former overseas Portuguese colonies.

The term was particularly applied to those who during the Processo Revolucionário Em Curso (Ongoing Revolutionary Process) power-struggle supported the entry of the colonies as well as mainland Portugal into the Soviet sphere of influence.

Perhaps the most exemplary case was that of Almirante Rosa Coutinho, the "red admiral", governor of Angola during the post-Carnation Revolution period, who was known for having ordered all arms owned by the public to be handed over to the authorities, following which he allowed the entry of Communist troops into the country via the Cuba-Angola airbridge.

Other examples are Otelo Saraiva de Carvalho and Vasco Gonçalves who visited Fidel Castro in the summer on 1975, just as the airbridge was reaching its peak.
