= Revolutionary Party of Central American Workers =

Defunct left-wing international political party in Central America founded in 1975

Revolutionary Party of the Central American Workers Partido Revolucionario de los Trabajadores Centroamericanos
- Founded: 1975
- Ideology: Revolutionary socialism Anti-imperialism; Centroamerican unionism
- Political position: Left-wing
- Colors: Red

Party flag
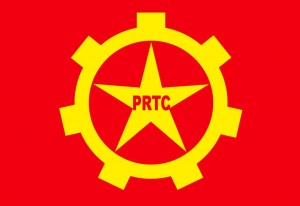

The Revolutionary Party of Central American Workers (Spanish: Partido Revolucionario de los Trabajadores Centroamericanos, PRTC) was a political party in Central America.

== Ideology ==
The group that founded the PRTC was inspired by Marxism-Leninism, Che Guevara and the experiences of the Vietnamese national liberation struggle. The party was accused of Trotskyism by other revolutionary groups, an accusation that the party rejected.

== History ==
The PRTC was founded in 1975, by a sector that had left the ERP-RN after the 1972 elections. Clandestine pre-congress meetings for the founding of PRTC were held in Costa Rica, Honduras and El Salvador in 1975. Provisional 'Zonal Leaderships' were formed in these countries. The party also formed cells in Mexico and the United States. Contacts were established with activists in Belize, Guatemala, Nicaragua and Panama. In April 1975 the Liberation League was founded as a multisectoral mass front, which was to become a front organization for the party. In December 1975 the plenary session of the party congress was opened with delegates from around Central America. The PRTC was formally founded in San José on January 25, 1976. Fabio Castillo Figueroa became the General Secretary of the party. The party adopted a democratic centralism as its organizational principle.

During the period of 1976-1978, the party built up organizational structures throughout Central America with the exception of Nicaragua. The leadership was based in Costa Rica. In Guatemala, several of the leaders of the party would later join ORPA. In El Salvador, the Zonal Leadership was made up of Mario López (a.k.a. Comandante Venancio, Zonal Secretary), Manuel Federico Castillo, Luis Díaz, Humberto Mendoza, Nidia Díaz and Joaquín Morales Chávez.

The second party congress of PRTC was held in Tegucigalpa in April 1979. The congress elected Dr. José María Reyes Mata as the new General Secretary of the party. The congress also formed a Central American Political Commission as a new party leadership. The Commission had one member from each Central American country.

In 1979, the party set up a series of new mass organizations in El Salvador. The peasant sector of the Liberation League was converted into a separate organization, Brigadas de Trabajadores del Campo (BTC). Other new mass organizations were Brigadas Revolucionarias de Estudiantes de Secundaria and Comités de Base Obrera. The People’s Liberation Movement (MLP) was formed as an umbrella body of the mass organizations of the party. In January 1980 MLP was one of the organizations that founded the Coordinadora Revolucionaria de Masas, an alliance which would later found the Revolutionary Democratic Front in April 1980. In 1979, the party also launched an armed wing, Fuerzas Armadas de Liberación Popular.

In August 1980 the main leader of PRTC in El Salvador, Luis Díaz, 'disappeared'.

In October 1980 a PRTC Central Committee meeting was held in Managua. The meeting dissolved the Central American structures of the party, converting the national party branches into separate parties. As a continuation of the unified PRTC, the meeting set up a Conference of Revolutionary Parties in Central America as a coordinating body of the individual PRTC. This shift was necessary for the Salvadoran branch of PRTC to be able to join the FMLN. The Salvadoran PRTC became one of the members of the FMLN guerrilla movement on December 5, 1980. The Honduran PRTC continued armed struggle of its own.
