= FD =

FD or similar may refer to:

== Biology ==
- Familial dysautonomia, a disorder of the autonomic nervous system
- Ferredoxin, iron–sulfur proteins

== Computing ==
- File descriptor, in Unix and related computer operating systems
- Freedesktop.org (fd.o), an interoperability project
- Functional dependency, a constraint in a relation from a database

== Transportation ==
=== Automotive ===
- Mazda RX-7 (FD), a car
- Nissan FD engine, for trucks and buses
- Formula Drift, an American motorsport series

=== Aviation ===
- Thai AirAsia, IATA airline code FD
- FD Phantom, original name for the FH Phantom jet fighter
- Flight director (aeronautics), a flight instrument

=== Other modes of transportation ===
- Russian locomotive class FD
- Flying Dutchman (dinghy)

== Business and politics ==
- Fixed deposit, a financial instrument
- Finance Director, or chief financial officer, in a company
- Financial Dynamics, a UK business services and lobbying firm acquired by FTI Consulting in 2006
- Force of the Right (Forța Dreptei), a Romanian political party
- Fidei defensor (Latin, 'Defender of the Faith'), part of the full style of many English/British monarchs

== Other uses ==
- Fire Department, providing firefighting services
- Canon FD lens mount, a standard for connecting a lens to a camera
- Fermi–Dirac statistics (F–D statistics), in quantum statistics

== See also ==
- Floppy disk drive (FDD) in early computers
