= Cayetano Carpio =

Salvadoran guerrilla leader (1918–1983)

Commander Salvador Cayetano Carpio
- Born: August 1919; Santa Tecla, El Salvador
- Died: 12 April 1983 (aged 63); Managua, Nicaragua
- Military career
- Allegiance: FMLN
- Service years: 1970–1983
- Rank: Commander
- Nickname: Commander Marcial
- Commands: Farabundo Martí Popular Liberation Forces
- Conflicts: Salvadoran Civil War: Final offensive of 1981

Salvador Cayetano Carpio (6 August 1919 – 12 April 1983), also known by his nom de guerre Commander Marcial, was a Salvadoran left-wing revolutionary and the Secretary-General of the Communist Party of El Salvador in the 1960s, until his resignation from the party where he then founded the Salvadoran revolutionary political-military organization, the Farabundo Martí Popular Liberation Forces (FPL).

Carpio's founding of the FPL was a result of his belief to end the military dictatorship in El Salvador through an armed revolution. However, the Salvadoran Communist Party was against armed struggle, instead engaging mainly in legal electoral and trade union organizing.

During the 1970s, Carpio's new organization, the FPL, became the largest group on the Salvadoran left, and therefore became the predominant force among the five organizations that joined together in 1980 under the umbrella of the Farabundo Marti National Liberation Front (FMLN). Carpio played a leading role in both the FPL and the FMLN. He was sometimes referred to as the "Ho Chi Minh of Latin America".

The official story of his death was that he committed suicide after being accused by other leaders in the FPL for the murder of FPL second-in-command Ana María on 6 April 1983 in Managua, Nicaragua.

== Early life ==
Salvador Cayetano Carpio was born in 1919 as a son of a cobbler. Throughout his life he worked as a laborer in various jobs, but he was most recognized as a baker. He became a trade union activist as a young man. Later he joined the Communist Party of El Salvador, he was later assigned its secretary general in the 1960s. As a result of various acts of political repression against the left, much of his adult life was spent in prison, in exile or underground.

== Forming of the FPL ==
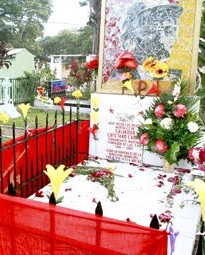
Carpio's grave

At the age of 50, Carpio headed for the hills with a small group of women and men. Under his leadership, the FPL combined armed struggle with different forms of mass organization. It was instrumental in the formation of the Popular Revolutionary Block (BPR or Bloque Popular Revolucionario), the largest of the cross-sector mass organizations that mobilized hundreds of thousands of Salvadorans in the economic and political struggles of the latter part of the 1970s. As the senior leader of the revolutionary movement and commander-in-chief of its largest organization, Carpio was a central figure in the Farabundo Martí National Liberation Front (FMLN).

== See also ==
- History of El Salvador
