= R/FemaleDatingStrategy =

Controversial women's subreddit

r/FemaleDatingStrategy (FDS) is a subreddit created in 2019. As of August 2021, FDS had about 179,000 members who were described as mostly heterosexual women.

== Content and organization ==
The group has a strict hierarchy, with moderators called "Ruthless Strategists" on top. Community is prioritized over the individual, and members are advised against speaking with journalists, practices which have been described as cult-like. The subreddit advises against dating men with mental illnesses, and has banned members for believing men can be victims of sexual assault. The members oppose liberal feminism, or "libfems", and endorse TERF-like views; transgender women are prohibited from posting. The sub has also been criticized for contradictory advice, such as encouraging independence from men while expecting them to pay for dates and be the primary breadwinners.

The subreddit historically made extensive use of female-incel ("femcel") language, but when the femcel jargon interfered with the recruitment of new members, users gradually adopted new terminology. It includes terms like "scrotes" for men and "pickmeisha" for women, who FDS claims degrade themselves for men. "Pickmeisha" has been used to label members that criticize the moderators or claim to enjoy banned behavior such as casual sex, and it has been targeted at women in other subreddits for issues such as seeking advice on their partner's erectile dysfunction.

== Reception ==
r/FemaleDatingStrategy has been accused by r/AgainstHateSubreddits of promoting homophobia, transphobia, misandry, and discrimination against sex workers. The Verge described the advice given to women in the sub as socially conservative, sexually conservative, and oppressive to women. FDS posters must follow strict rules to avoid being banned, with support for consensual BDSM, pornography consumption, or casual sex being bannable offenses.

Critics have compared r/FemaleDatingStrategy to the manosphere subreddits it was created to oppose. Quoted in a 2022 Guardian article, a co-host for FDS's podcast said: "[FDS] isn't about trying to manipulate men into trying to behave a certain way ... it's more about finding a man who is comfortable with you having boundaries and standards, and who understands how to treat a woman."

== See also ==
- Controversial Reddit communities
