= Cuba–Angola airbridge =

1974–75 Angolan Civil War logistics operation

The Cuba–Angola airbridge (Portuguese: Ponte aérea Cuba-Angola) was an airbridge conducted in 1974 and 1975 to allow the arrival of Cuban troops and military equipment in Angola. Its goal was to support the MPLA political party, as part of a larger Cuban operation known as Operation Carlota. The airbridge allowed the entry of Cuban troops and military equipment in Angola to strengthen the weakened People's Armed Forces for the Liberation of Angola (FAPLA), the military wing of the MPLA. The Cuban special troops and military equipment were initially transported from Cuba in two old four-engine Bristol Britannias by the Cuban national airline, Cubana de Aviación. The establishment of the airbridge revitalized the MPLA and is seen as a turning point in its consolidation of power in Angola.
