= Salvadoran Democratic Front =

The Salvadoran Democratic Front (Spanish: Frente Democrático Salvadoreño) was a broad front of democratic organizations in El Salvador formed on April 1, 1980. After existing for only 17 days, the FDS into the Revolutionary Democratic Front on April 18.

It consisted of, amongst others, Movimiento Independiente de Profesionales y Técnicos de El Salvador (MIPTES), Movimiento Popular Social Cristiano (MPSC), Movimiento Nacional Revolucionario (MNR), Trade Union federations, small business owners and a minor sector of dissident militaries. Amongst the militaries that joined FDS was the Colonel Ernesto Claramont, who had been the presidential candidate of National Opposition Union in 1977. Two universities were also affiliated as observers: Universidad de El Salvador and Universidad Centroamericana "José Simeón Cañas".

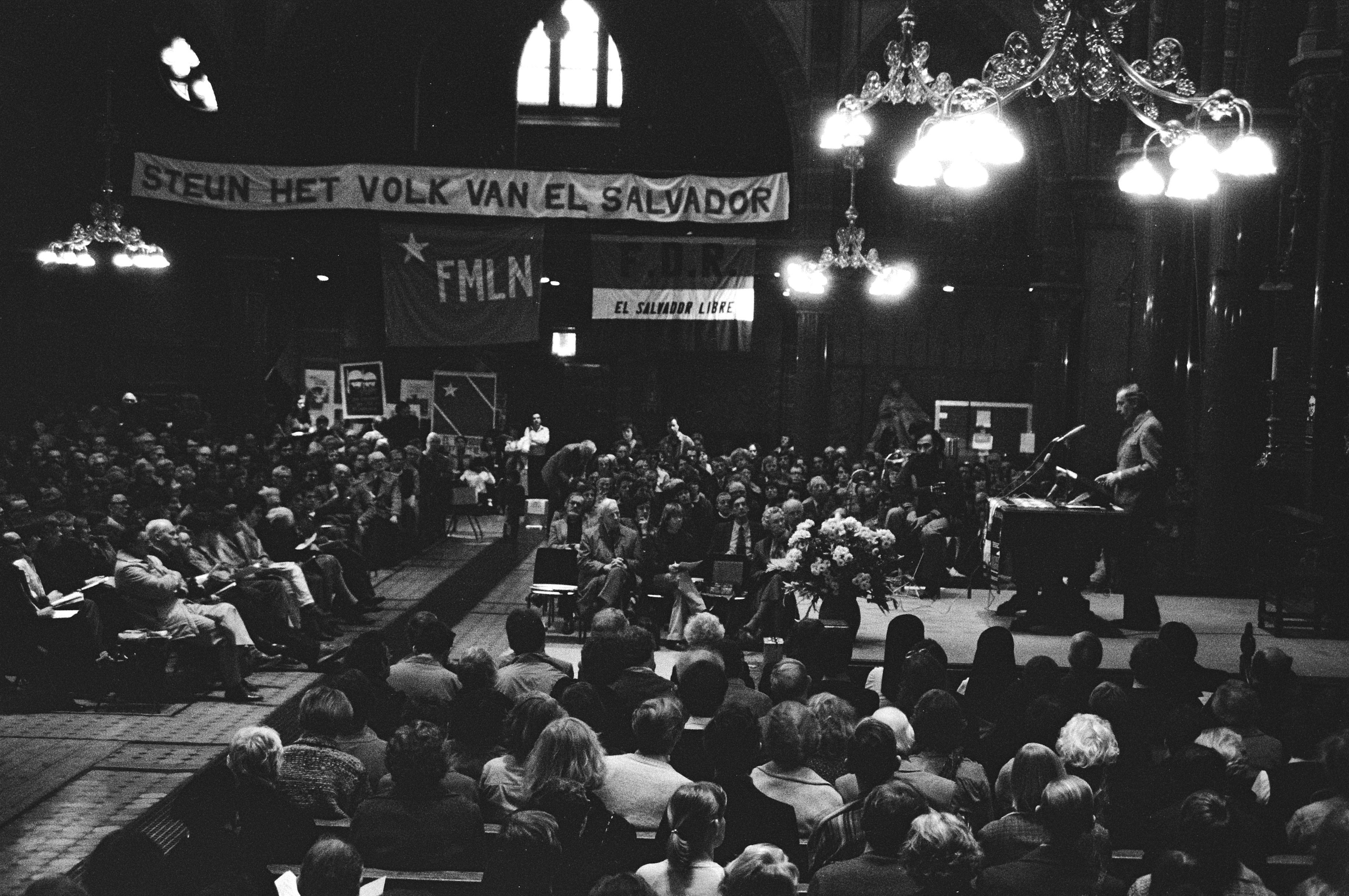
Commemoration in the Dominicus Church in Amsterdam that year ago Bishop Romero, human rights judge in El Salvador, was murdered, in the back Revolutionary Democratic Front.
