= People's Liberation Movement (El Salvador) =

The People's Liberation Movement (Spanish: Movimiento de Liberación Popular) was a revolutionary multisectoral mass organisation, politically tied to the Revolutionary Party of Central American Workers in El Salvador. The organisation was formed after a split from Unified Popular Action Front in May 1975 as League for Liberation (Liga para la Liberación). The main leaders of the organisation at the time were Manuel Federico Castillo, Nidia Diaz, Francisco Veliz and Humberto Mendoza.

The movement was reorganised in 1979, as Brigadas de Trabajadores del Campo, Brigadas Revolucionaria de Estudiantes de Secundaria and Comités de Base Obrera were formed as separate sectoral organisations. The League was replaced with MLP, which constituted of these sectoral organisations. In May 1980, MLP joined the Coordinadora Revolucionaria de Masas.
