= Communist Party of El Salvador =

Far-left political party in El Salvador

Communist Party of El Salvador Partido Comunista de El Salvador
- Leader: Schafik Hándal; Cayetano Carpio
- Founder: Miguel Mármol
- Founded: 30 March 1930; 2005 (re-established)
- Dissolved: 1995
- Merged into: Farabundo Martí National Liberation Front (1995)
- Ideology: Communism; Marxism–Leninism
- Political position: Far-left
- International affiliation: IMCWP
- Colors: Red

Party flag
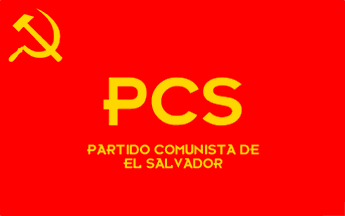

Website
- partidocomunistadeelsalvador.blogspot.com

The Communist Party of El Salvador (Spanish: Partido Comunista de El Salvador) is a Marxist-Leninist party in El Salvador. The Communist Party was founded by Miguel Mármol on 10 March 1930, merged into the Farabundo Martí National Liberation Front in 1995, then re-established on 27 March 2005.

== History ==
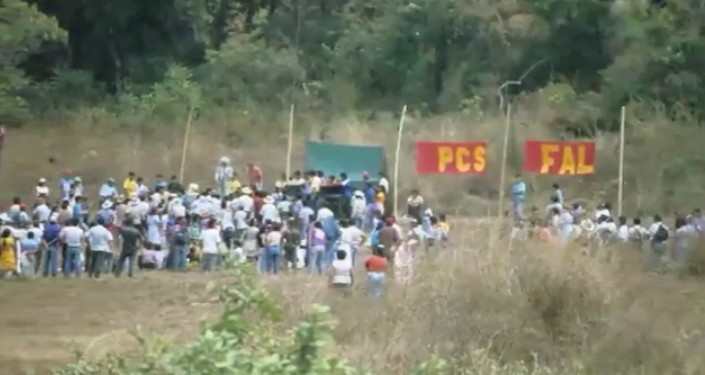
The PCS acted militarily through the Armed Forces of Liberation (FAL), one of the smallest groups during the war stage, which concentrated its forces in the Cerro de Guazapa.

In the mid-1960s the U.S. State Department estimated the party membership to be approximately 200. In 1980, it joined with four other leftist parties in the country - the FPL, RN, PRTC and ERP - to form a revolutionary political-military front called the Farabundo Martí National Liberation Front (Frente Farabundo Martí para la Liberación Nacional - FMLN).

The FMLN waged a guerrilla war against the Salvadoran government, which had been a military dictatorship since the 1930s. The Communist Party of El Salvador and the four other parties continued to exist as separate organizations under the umbrella of the FMLN throughout El Salvador's civil war from 1980 to 1992.

When the civil war ended in 1992, the FMLN became a legal political party and began to compete in elections. After the 1994 elections, the Communist Party and the four other parties that comprised the FMLN dissolved themselves as separate organizations, merging into a singular FMLN with no competing internal organizations. At that point the Communist Party of El Salvador ceased to exist as an independent entity, though many of its leaders and members are still visible in the FMLN. For example, former Communist Party leader Schafik Hándal was the FMLN's presidential candidate in the 2004 elections.

During the Salvadoran civil war from 1980 to 1992, Schafik Hándal was the leader of the Communist Party. Prior to him, Cayetano Carpio was the Communist Party leader in the 1960s, before leaving the CP to form the FPL and launch the armed struggle against the dictatorship in 1970.

On 27 March 2005, a group of Salvadoran communists formed a new PCES, in the tradition of the old party that dissolved into the FMLN.
