= Farabundo Martí Popular Liberation Forces =

Left-wing militant and political organization in El Salvador from 1970 to 1995

FPL
- Farabundo Martí Popular Liberation Forces
- FPL flag.
- Leader: Salvador Cayetano Carpio
- Dates active: 1 April 1970 – 1995
- Ideology: Communism; Marxism–Leninism; Liberation theology
- Political position: Far-left
- Wars: the Salvadoran Civil War, Nicaraguan Revolution

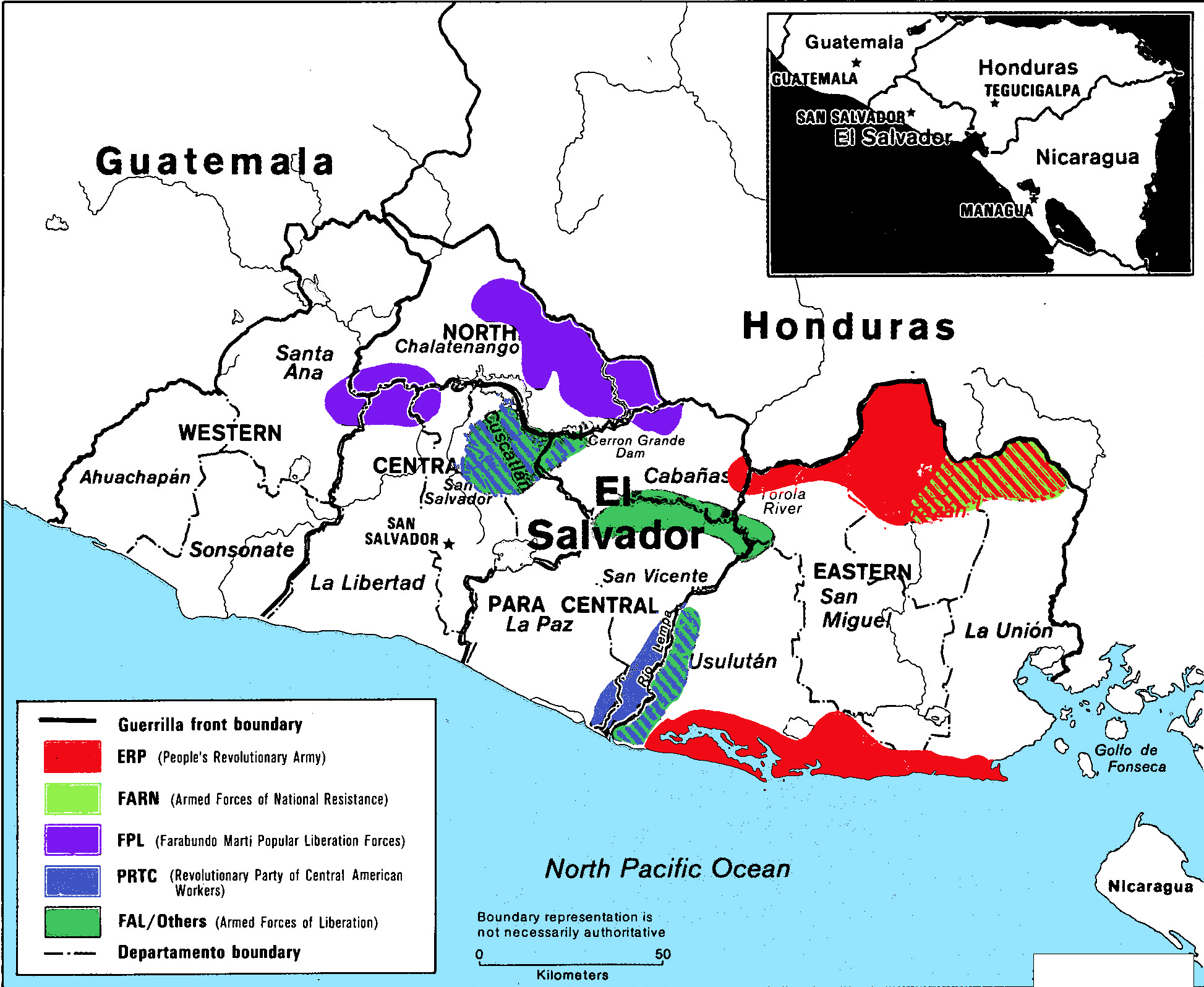
Map of communist groups in El Salvador during the civil war

The Farabundo Martí Popular Liberation Forces (Spanish: Fuerzas Populares de Liberación Farabundo Martí, abbreviated FPL) was a left wing guerrilla military and political organization in El Salvador. It was the oldest of the five groups that merged in 1980 to form the Farabundo Martí National Liberation Front (FMLN).

== History ==
Named after Salvadoran revolutionary Farabundo Martí, the FPL grew out of the Communist Party of El Salvador (PCES), which at the end of the 1960s proposed armed aggression as the best method to oppose the military dictatorship in El Salvador. The FPL was formed on 1 April 1970; amongst the founders, Salvador Cayetano Carpio was considered the top leader of the organization, while Mélida Anaya Montes, the leader of the educational union, and university professors Clara Elizabeth Ramírez and Felipe Peña Mendoza were high-profile figures.

During the 1970s, the FPL began to increase its social base, carrying out political and social work with the farmers of the North and Central Zone of El Salvador and with university students. In 1975, the People's Revolutionary Bloc (BPR) formed to unite trade unions and farmers. In 1979, the organization initiated conversations with other armed groups on the left for the unification of the revolutionary forces. These negotiations led to the foundation of the Farabundo Martí National Liberation Front (FMLN) on 10 October 1980.

During the Salvadoran Civil War, the FPL maintained its bases in the rural departments of Chalatenango, Cabañas, Usulután and the San Vicente Department. In April 1983 the organization faced a serious internal crisis with the assassination of Mélida Anaya Montes (Commander Ana María) in Managua, Nicaragua. The Secretary General and leader of the organization, Salvador Cayetano Carpio was accused of ordering the assassination, and committed suicide before the investigations into her death concluded.

After the events of April 1983, Commander Leonel González was chosen as the new Secretary General of the organization. After the Chapultepec Peace Accords, the FPL demobilized their military apparatus. By 1995 the organization had dissolved and had been completely integrated into the FMLN.

=== Kidnappings ===
On 28 October 1979 the FPL kidnapped the South African Ambassador to El Salvador, Archibald (Eddie) Gardner Dunn, during a raid on the South African embassy in San Salvador. Although the FPL initially claimed the kidnapping was done for ideological reasons a randsom demand of US$20 million was made for his release. This was negotiated down to US$ 1 million by the South African government through intermediaries but the transaction was never completed. The FPL announced that they had executed Ambassador Dunn on 9 October 1980. It is speculated that Dun had died, likely at the hands of the FPL, sometime before it was announced, possibly during a botched escape attempt by another person being held in an FPL safe house.

== Ideology ==
The FPL was a communist movement. It initially adhered to rigidly communist principles and believed that only rural insurgency could be successful, but grew more pragmatic over time and became willing to work together with the FMLN. The organization also followed liberation theology, to the point that the Salvadoran security forces believes that the FPL was formed by progressive Jesuits. Its adherence to liberation theology became a major factor in the group's recruitment efforts, as the organization relied on "networks centered on catholic priests like Benito Tovar in Chalatenango" to attract supporters and recruits.
