= Revolutionary Party of the Central American Workers – El Salvador =

Left-wing political party in El Salvador from 1980 to 1995

Revolutionary Party of the Central American Workers – El Salvador Partido Revolucionario de los Trabajadores Centroamericanos – El Salvador
- Founded: 1980
- Dissolved: 1995
- Merged into: Farabundo Martí National Liberation Front
- Ideology: Revolutionary socialism Anti-imperialism; Centroamerican unionism
- Political position: Left-wing
- Alliance: FMLN
- Colors: Red

Party flag
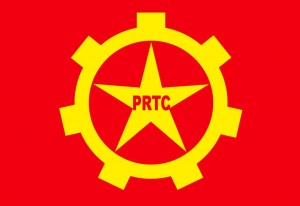

The Revolutionary Party of the Central American Workers – El Salvador (Spanish: Partido Revolucionario de los Trabajadores Centroamericanos – El Salvador, PRTC) was a political party in El Salvador. The party was one of five constituents of the Farabundo Martí National Liberation Front during the Salvadoran Civil War.

== History ==
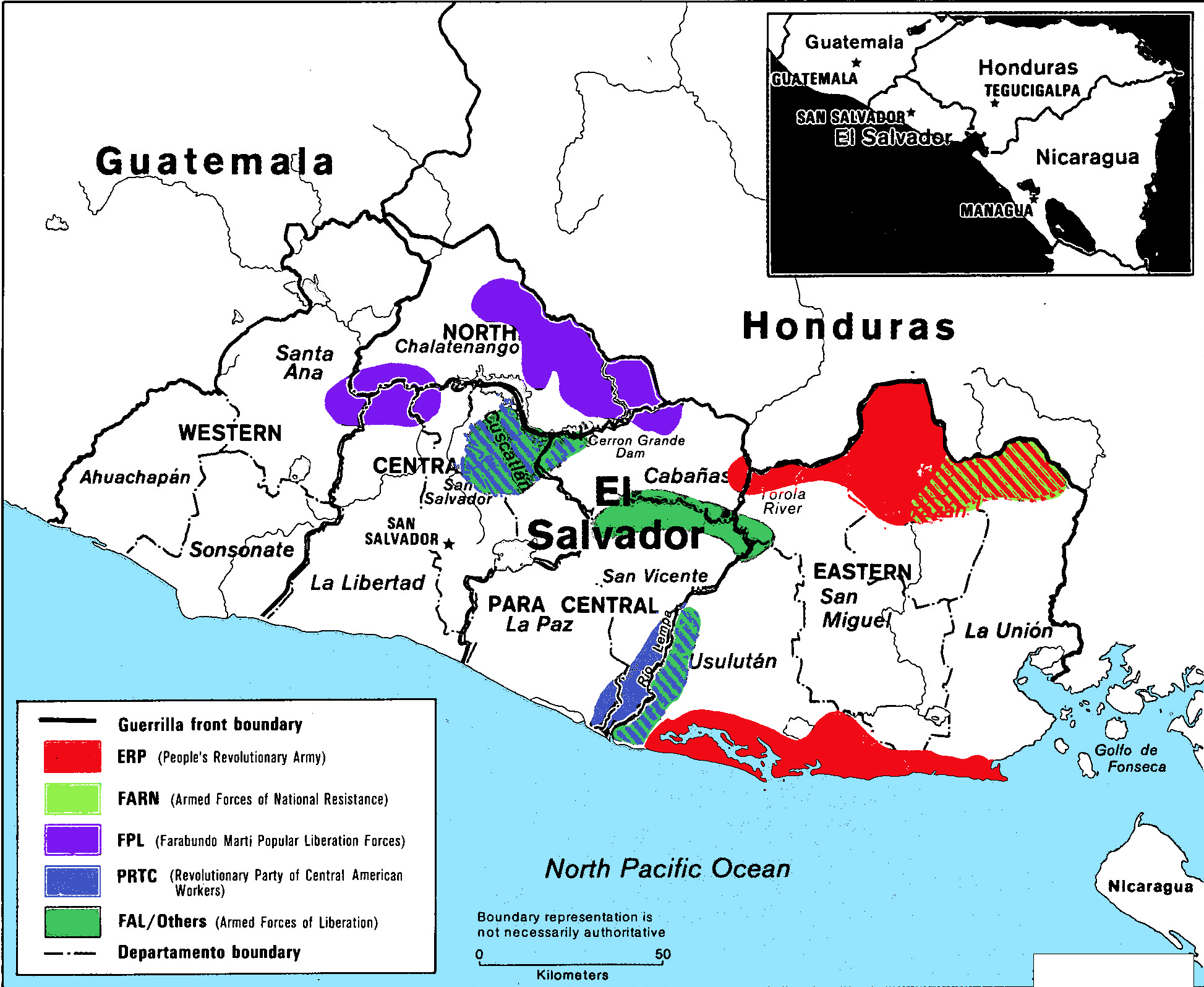
Map of communist groups in El Salvador during the civil war

The party was formed by the Salvadoran branch of the Revolutionary Party of Central American Workers (PRTC), as the PRTC was dissolved in October 1980. The dissolution of the Central American structure of PRTC was a precondition for the Salvadoran PRTC to join the FMLN. On December 5, 1980, the Salvadoran PRTC joined FMLN.

In November 1980, the PRTC leader, Humberto Mendoza, was killed. In January 1981, FMLN launched ’total war’ against the Salvadoran state. The major zones of military operations of PRTC were San Salvador, Guazapa, northern San Vicente, southern Usulután, and northern San Miguel. The major military formation of PRTC at the time was Destacamento Luis Diaz. The PRTC built up two schools, a political-ideological school named Adan Diaz and a military school named after Humberto Mendoza.

The third party congress (counting the two congresses of the unified PRTC as its own) was held in Guazapa in January. Francisco Jovel was elected as the new General Secretary. The congress came to the conclusion that the war was likely to be prolonged, and thus the party reoriented itself towards more focus on combining armed struggle with mass struggles. In 1983, the PRTC launched an urban guerrilla structure, Comandos Urbanos Mardoqueo Cruz. The party also built up a 'Special Force', to conduct strategic actions. In June 1985 an attack against U.S. Marines was carried out by the Comandos Urbanos Mardoqueno Cruz, killing 13 people (including four civilians). In 1987 PRTC took part in building up the Movimiento Pan Tierra y Fuego.

In September 1992, FMLN was transformed into a political party. The PRTC party structure was maintained, though. The fourth party congress of PRTC was held in 1993, which reelected Jovel as General Secretary and Nidia Díaz as Joint Secretary. During 1993, after the signing of peace treaty, the PRTC lost several of its leaders in political assassinations, such as Francisco Veliz and Mario López. Nidia Díaz was attacked twice. The 1994 fifth party congress decided to remove Jovel and Dias from the PRTC leadership, since they had been included in the Political Commission of FMLN. Manuel Melgar was elected as the new General Secretary and Aída Herrara as Joint Coordinator. The sixth party congress, held in June 1995, decided to dissolve the PRTC, as part of the process of transforming FMLN into a unitary party.
