= People's Revolutionary Bloc =

Salvadoran paramilitary

- Bloque Popular Revolucionario
- Flag of the People's Revolutionary Bloc
- Founder: Cayetano Carpio
- Secretary-General: Julio Flores
- Dates active: 1975 – 1995
- Ideology: Communism; Marxism–Leninism
- Political position: Far-left
- Size: 50,000–70,000
- Part of: Farabundo Martí Liberation People's Forces
- Wars: the Salvadoran Civil War

The People's Revolutionary Bloc (Spanish: Bloque Popular Revolucionario, abbreviated BPR) was a Salvadoran militant organization that was founded by the Farabundo Martí Liberation People's Forces (FLP) in 1975. The BPR was mainly composed intellectuals, teachers, students, and rural peasants and workers. The group was led by General-Secretary Julio Flores.

== See also ==
- Farabundo Martí Liberation People's Forces
