= Unified Popular Action Front =

El Salvador political movement

FAPU symbol

FAPU poster

Unified Popular Action Front (Spanish: Frente de Acción Popular Unificada) was a revolutionary mass front in El Salvador, linked to the National Resistance Armed Forces, formed in 1974. It consisted of trade union, student, peasants and teachers organizations.

In 1980 FAPU was one of the founding organizations of Coordinadora Revolucionaria de Masas.
