= List of wars: 1945–1989 =

List of wars from 1945 to 1989

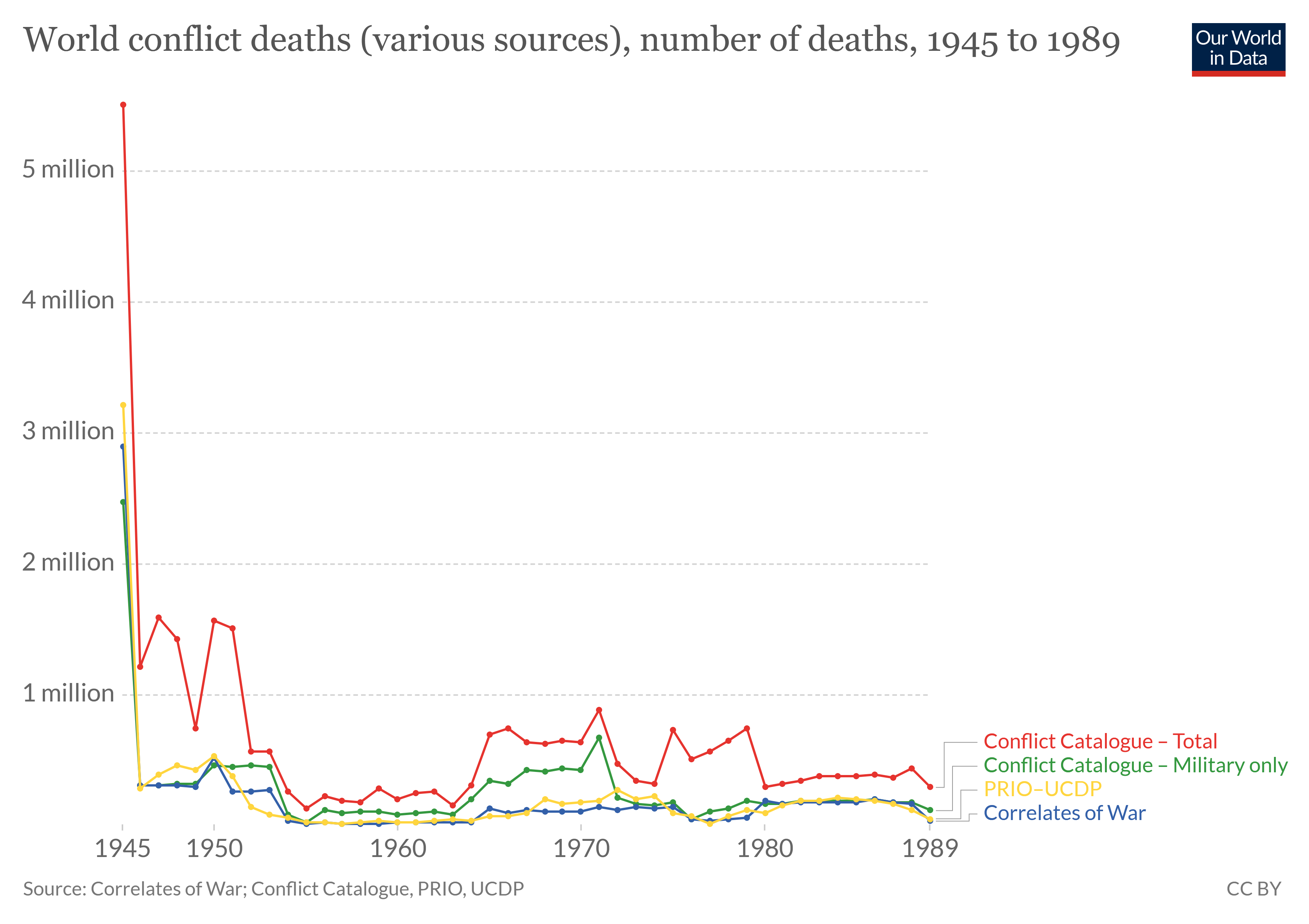
Graph of global conflict deaths from 1945 to 1989 from various sources.

This is a list of wars that began between 1945 and 1989. Other wars can be found in the historical lists of wars and the list of wars extended by diplomatic irregularity. Major conflicts of this period include the Chinese Civil War in Asia, the Greek Civil War in Europe, the Colombian civil war known as La Violencia in South America, the Vietnam War in Southeast Asia, the Ethiopian Civil War in Africa, and the Guatemalan Civil War in North America.

== 1945–1949 ==
Started	Ended	Name of conflict	Belligerents	
Started	Ended	Name of conflict	Victorious party (if applicable)	Defeated party (if applicable)
1945	1963	Polish anti-communist resistance insurgency	Polish Committee of National Liberation (until 1945) Polish People's Republic (from 1945): MO; ORMO; ZOMO; SB; NKVD; Supported by: Soviet Union	Polish anti-communist resistance movements ("Unbroken Soldiers"): Home Army; National Armed Forces; Freedom and Independence Association; ...and other various organized and un-organized groups
1945	1962	Romanian anti-communist resistance movement Part of World War II, the Cold War and anti-communist insurgencies in Central and Eastern Europe	Kingdom of Romania (until 1947); Romanian People's Republic (from 1947): PCR; Securitate; Supported by: Soviet Union	Anti-communist groups: Nationalists; Monarchists; National Peasantists; Iron Guards; Supported by: United States; United Kingdom; CNR
1945	1949	1945 Khuzestan revolt	Iran	Khuzestan rebels
1945	1945	Conquest of al-Ghurfa	British Empire: Aden Protectorate	Al-Ghurfa
1945	1950	Crusader insurgency	Yugoslavia	Crusaders
1945	1949	Chinese Civil War (second phase); Part of the Chinese Communist Revolution and the Cold War	1945–1949 Yan'an Soviet People's Republic of China (1949): Chinese Communist Party; People's Liberation Army	1945–1949 (Republic of China (1912–1949)) Republic of China: Kuomintang; Republic of China Armed Forces
1945	1945	August Revolution; Part of the Civil War in Vietnam (1945-49), French Indochina in World War II, the South-East Asian theatre of World War II, the Pacific Theater of World War II, and the Decolonisation of Asia	Việt Minh: National Liberation Committee of Vietnam (from 16 to 25 August); Provisional Revolutionary Government of Democratic Republic of Vietnam (from 28 August); Vanguard Youth (from 22 August); Supported by: United States – Bình Xuyên; Hòa Hảo; Cao Đài Trotskyist Vietnam Revolutionary League: Vietnamese Provisional National Government; Việt Quốc; Đại Việt Nationalist	Empire of Vietnam National Unified Front: Vanguard Youth (until 22 August); Supported by: Japan
1945	1949	Indonesian National Revolution; Part of the aftermath of World War II and the decolonisation of Asia	Indonesia: PDRI (Note: 1948-1949, after Operation Kraai); TNI; POLRI; Japanese holdouts; British Indian volunteers (Note: after 1947)	Netherlands (Note: from 1946): Dutch East Indies; KNIL; NICA; Pao An Tui (Note: claimed neutrality); United Kingdom (Note: until 1946): British Raj; Japan DI/TII (from 1949) FDR Small guerrilla groups
1945	Ongoing	Korean conflict Part of the Cold War in Asia (until 1991)	South Korea	North Korea
1945	1946	War in Vietnam (1945–46); Part of the aftermath of World War II and the Indochina Wars	British Empire: United Kingdom; India; France Japan	Southern Resistance Committee of Viet Minh: Vanguard Youth; National Guard; Southern Provisional Administrative Committee; Vietnam People's Army; Pro-Viet Minh Bình Xuyên; Hòa Hảo Cao Đài Anti-communist Bình Xuyên Việt Nam Quốc Dân Đảng
1945	1946	1945 Hazara Rebellion	Hazara rebels	Kingdom of Afghanistan
1945	1946	Iran crisis of 1946; Part of the aftermath of the Second World War, prelude to the Cold War and Kurdish separatism in Iran	Iran; Supported by: United Kingdom; United States	Azerbaijan People's Government; Republic of Mahabad; Tudeh Military Network; Supported by: Soviet Union
1946	1949	Greek Civil War; Part of the Cold War (from 1947)	Kingdom of Greece: Hellenic Army; Royal Hellenic Air Force (minor participation); Royal Hellenic Navy (limited participation in support); Royal Gendarmerie; MAY (1946–1948); TEA (1948–1949); Supported by: United Kingdom (1944–1947); United States (1946–1949)	Provisional Democratic Government (from 1947): Democratic Army (from December 1946); Communist Party of Greece and allies; Ex-EAM members and other communist guerrillas' local groups (March 1946 – December 1946); People's Civil Guard; Supported by: Yugoslavia (1946–1948); Bulgaria; Albania; Soviet Union (limited)
1946	1954	Hukbalahap Rebellion; Part of the Cold War	Philippines; Supported by: United States	Philippine Communist Party
1946	1946	Autumn Uprising of 1946	United States Army Military Government in Korea; Right-wing groups: Korean National Youth Association; Northwest Youth League	Communist Party of Korea; National Council of Korean Labour Unions
1946	1946	Corfu Channel incident Part of the Cold War	Albania	United Kingdom
1946	1946	Punnapra-Vayalar uprising	(Travancore) Kingdom of Travanore	Laborers in Punnapra and Vayalar; Communist Party of India
1946	1954	First Indochina War; Part of the Indochina Wars, the Civil war in Vietnam (1945-1949), the decolonization of Asia, and the Cold War in Asia	Democratic Republic of Vietnam: (North Vietnam) Việt Minh; Lao Issara (1945-1949); Pathet Lao (1949-1954); Khmer Issarak	French Union: France; French Indochina; State of Vietnam; Kingdom of Cambodia; Kingdom of Laos; United States (1953–54): CIA
1946	1951	Telangana Rebellion	1946–1948: Hyderabad State Durras of Hyderabad Razakar movement (1947–1948) Supported by: Britain (1946–1947) 1948–1951: Government of India Hyderabad State Durras of Hyderabad Supported by: United States	Telangana peasants Andhra Mahasabha Communist Party of India Supported by: Congress socialists (Tirtha Group) Socialist Party of India (1948–1951)
1947	1947	Paraguayan Civil War (1947); Part of the Cold War (from 12 March 1947)	Paraguayan Government; Military of Paraguay; Colorado militias Supported by: Argentina; United States	Liberal Party; Febrerista Revolutionary Concentration; Paraguayan Communist Party
1947	1949	Malagasy Uprising; Part of the decolonisation of Africa	France: French colonial empire; PADESM (limited involvement)	Malagasy secret societies: Jiny; Panama; Local militias MDRM (limited involvement); Supported by: United Kingdom (disputed; French intelligence claims)
1947	1947	1947 Poonch rebellion	Azad Army: Predominantly Sudhans in Poonch; Pahari-speaking people in Mirpur Division; Supported by: Pakistan	Jammu and Kashmir State Forces
1947	1948	Annexation of Junagadh	Dominion of India	Junagadh State
1947
Indo-Pakistani wars and conflicts Part of the Kashmir conflict and the Cold War	India; Bangladesh (1971)	Pakistan; Alleged proxies: Kashmiri insurgents; Jammu Kashmir Liberation Front; Lashkar-e-Taiba; Jaish-e-Mohammed; United Jihad Council; Hizbul Mujahideen; People's Anti-Fascist Front; The Resistance Front; Dukhtaran-e-Millat; Harkat-ul-Mujahideen; Harkat-ul-Jihad al-Islami; Khalistani insurgents (1984–1995); Mizo insurgents (1961–1986)		
1947	1949	Indo-Pakistani War of 1947–1948 Part of the Indo-Pakistani wars, Kashmir conflict, and the Partition of India	India: Jammu and Kashmir (Note: Jammu and Kashmir fought a Pakistani invasion of its territories as a sovereign princely state from 22 October 1947 to 26 October 1947, when it signed an instrument of accession to India in exchange for military support. After this point, Jammu and Kashmir fought as an autonomous princely state within the Union of India until the end of the war.)	Pakistan
1947	1948	1947–1948 civil war in Mandatory Palestine; Part of the intercommunal conflict in Mandatory Palestine, the 1948 Palestine War and the decolonisation of Asia	(Israel) Jewish National Council; Haganah; Palmach; Irgun; Lehi; Foreign volunteers; Allied Bedouin tribes	Arab Higher Committee; (All-Palestine Protectorate) Army of the Holy War; Arab Liberation Army; Jordan; Arab Legion; United Kingdom; Mandatory Palestine
1948 or 1947	1949	Safi Rebellion	Afghanistan	Safi rebels
1948	1948	Al-Wathbah uprising	(Iraq) Iraqi Police	Student Cooperation Committee (communists); Progressive Democrats; Populists; Kurdish Democrats; Student wings of the National Democratic Party and the Independence Party
1948	1948	Costa Rican Civil War; Part of the Cold War	National Liberation Army; Ulatista Forces; Caribbean Legion; Supported by: Guatemala; United States	Government of Costa Rica; Calderon forces People's Vanguard Party; Nicaraguan National Guard
1948	Ongoing	Internal conflict in Myanmar	Union of Burma (1948–1962); Socialist Republic of the Union of Burma (1962–1988); Union of Myanmar (1988–2011); Myanmar (since 2011); SAC (since 2021)	National Unity Government (since 2021); People's Defence Force; Ethnic armed organisations (Note: The government of Myanmar refers to all insurgent groups as "ethnic armed organisations", including groups like the All Burma Students' Democratic Front and Communist Party of Burma, which do not fight for a specific ethnic group's interests.)
1948	1949	Jeju uprising Part of the division of Korea and the Cold War	United States Army Military Government in Korea (until August 1948); South Korea (from August 1948); Northwest Youth League; Korean Youth League	Workers' Party of South Korea: Local supporters
1948	1958	La Violencia; Part of the Colombian Civil Wars and the Cold War	Colombian Conservative Party: Conservative party paramilitary groups; Pájaros; Chulavitas	Colombian Liberal Party and allied militias: Liberal party paramilitary groups; Colombian Communist Party; Grupos de Autodefensas Campesinas
1948	1949	1948 Arab–Israeli War; Part of the 1948 Palestine war and the Arab–Israeli conflict	Israel Before 26 May 1948: (Israel) Yishuv; Paramilitary groups: Haganah; Palmach; Hish; Him; Irgun; Lehi; Allied Bedouin tribes After 26 May 1948: Israel Defense Forces; Minorities Unit; Foreign volunteers: Mahal	Arab League: Egypt; All-Palestine Protectorate (Note: After 22 September 1948); Holy War Army; Transjordan; Iraq; Syria; Lebanon (Note: Lebanon had decided to not participate in the war and only took part in the battle of al-Malikiya on 5–6 June 1948.); Saudi Arabia; Yemen Irregulars: Arab Liberation Army; Al-Najjada; Holy War Army
1948	1960	Malayan Emergency; Part of the decolonization of Asia and Cold War in Asia	British Commonwealth forces: United Kingdom: Federation of Malaya; Singapore; Malacca (until 1957); Penang (until 1957); Kenya; Southern Rhodesia (until 1953); Rhodesia and Nyasaland (from 1953); Fiji; Australia; New Zealand; Supported by: Thailand (Thai–Malaysian border)	Communist forces: Malayan Communist Party; Malayan National Liberation Army
1948	1948	Annexation of Hyderabad; Part of Telangana Rebellion and the Political integration of India	Dominion of India	Hyderabad
1948	1948	Madiun Affair; Part of the Indonesian National Revolution	Indonesia; TNI; POLRI	People's Democratic Front; PKI; PS; PBI; SOBSI; Pesindo
1948	1948	Yeosu–Suncheon rebellion Part of the division of Korea	South Korea	Workers' Party of South Korea; Local supporters 14th regiment
1948	1950	Pre-Korean War insurgency	South Korea	Anti-government insurgents (North Korea) Pro-North Korean rebels
1949	1949	1949 Hazara Rebellion	Kingdom of Afghanistan	Hazara rebels
1949	1956	Palestinian Fedayeen insurgency Part of the Israeli–Palestinian conflict and Arab–Israeli conflict	Israel	Palestinian Fedayeen Supported by: All-Palestine Protectorate; Kingdom of Egypt (until 1953); Republic of Egypt (from 1953); Syria; Jordan
1949	1949	Palace Rebellion	Phibun regime (Thailand) Royal Thai Army	(Thailand) Democracy February 26 Movement (Thailand) Royal Thai Navy (Thailand) Royal Thai Marine Corps
1949	1953	Campaign to Suppress Bandits in Central and Southern China Part of the Chinese Civil War	China	National Revolutionary Army
1949	1962	Darul Islam rebellion Part of the aftermath of the Indonesian National Revolution and Cold War in Asia	Republic of Indonesia	Islamic State of Indonesia; 426 Battalion (1951–1952); Legion of the Just Ruler (until 1950)
1949	Ongoing	Afghanistan–Pakistan border skirmishes Part of the Taliban insurgency and Insurgency in Khyber Pakhtunkhwa	Pakistan	(Taliban) Afghanistan Tehrik-i-Taliban Pakistan (since 2012); Jamaat-ul-Ahrar (2015–2020)

== 1950–1959 ==
Started	Ended	Name of conflict	Belligerents	
Started	Ended	Name of conflict	Victorious party (if applicable)	Defeated party (if applicable)
1950	1958	Kuomintang Islamic insurgency Part of the Cross-Strait conflict, the Chinese Civil War, and the Cold War	People's Republic of China: Chinese Communist Party	Republic of China: Kuomintang
1950	1950	APRA coup d'état Part of the aftermath of the Indonesian National Revolution	Indonesia; TNI	Legion of the Just Ruler (APRA)
1950	1950	Makassar Uprising; Part of the aftermath of the Indonesian National Revolution	Republic of Indonesia	East Indonesia
1950	1966	Indonesian invasion of South Maluku; Part of the aftermath of the Indonesian National Revolution	Indonesia; TNI	Republic of South Maluku
1950	1950	La Revolución del 50	Peru	Rebels
25 June 1950	27 July 1953	Korean War; Part of the Cold War and the Korean conflict	South Korea; United Nations (Note: On 9 July 1951 troop constituents were: US: 70.4%; ROK: 23.3%; other UNC: 6.3%.); United States; ... see other countries	North Korea; China; Soviet Union (air support only)
1950	1950	Battle of Chamdo; Part of the Annexation of Tibet by the People's Republic of China and the Cold War	China	Tibet
1950	1954	Puerto Rican Nationalist Party revolts of the 1950s	United States: Puerto Rico National Guard	Puerto Rican Nationalist Party: Cadets of the Republic
1950s	1960s	Reprisal operations (Israel) Part of the Palestinian Fedayeen insurgency (during the Arab–Israeli conflict)	Israel	All-Palestine: Palestinian fedayeen; Supported by: Kingdom of Egypt (1950–1953); Egypt (1953–1958); Egypt (UAR) (1958–1970); Jordan; Syria
1951	1951	Manhattan Rebellion	Phibun's Government	Group of naval officers
1952	1955	Buraimi dispute	Trucial Emirates: Emirate of Abu Dhabi; British Empire; Supported by Sultanate of Muscat and Oman; Aden Protectorate	Saudi Arabia; Supported by: Al Bu Shamis tribe; Na'im tribe
1952	1952	1952 Hazara Rebellion	Afghanistan	Rebels
1952	1952	Egyptian revolution of 1952; Part of the decolonisation of Africa and Asia, the Cold War, and the Arab Cold War	(Egypt) Free Officers Movement; Supported by: United States	Kingdom of Egypt; Supported by: United Kingdom
1952	1960	Mau Mau rebellion Part of the decolonisation of Africa	United Kingdom: Kenya; Uganda; Southern Rhodesia	Mau Mau rebels (Note: The name Kenya Land and Freedom Army is sometimes heard in connection with Mau Mau. KLFA was the name that Dedan Kimathi used for a coordinating body which he tried to set up for Mau Mau. It was also the name of another militant group that sprang up briefly in the spring of 1960; the group was broken up during a brief operation from 26 March to 30 April.): Kenya Land and Freedom Army; Maasai Bands (from 1954)
1953	1953	Air battle over Merklín; Part of the Cold War	Czechoslovakia	United States
1953	1953	1953 Plzeň uprising Part of the Cold War	Czechoslovakia	Demonstrators
1953	1953	East German uprising of 1953; Part of the Cold War	East Germany; Soviet Union	(East Germany) Anti-Stalinist demonstrators
1953	1959	Cuban Revolution	26th of July Movement; Revolutionary Directorate of March 13th; Second National Front of Escambray	Cuba: Cuban Constitutional Army
1953	1953	1953 Iranian coup d'état Part of the Abadan Crisis and the Cold War	House of Pahlavi supporters; United States (Note: Covertly); United Kingdom	Iranian Government supporters
1954	1954	1954 Paraguayan coup d'état	(Paraguay) Paraguayan Army; Colorado Party	Government of Paraguay
1954	1954	Kengir uprising	(Soviet Union) Soviet Army (Soviet Union) MVD (Soviet Union) Gulag authorities	Kengir resistance
1954	1954	Annexation of Dadra and Nagar Haveli; Part of the decolonisation of Asia and the Cold War	(India) Indian nationalists and communists: United Front of Goans; National Liberation Movement Organization; Goan People's Party; Communist Party of India; Azad Gomantak Dal; Rashtriya Swayamsevak Sangh; Supported by: India	Portugal: Portuguese India
1954	1955	First Taiwan Strait Crisis; Part of the Cold War and the aftermath of the Chinese Civil War	People's Republic of China	Republic of China; United States
1954	1959	Jebel Akhdar War; Part of the decolonisation of Asia and the Arab Cold War	Sultanate of Muscat; United Kingdom	Imamate of Oman; Supported by: Republic of Egypt; Saudi Arabia
1954	1962	Algerian War; Part of the Cold War and the decolonisation of Africa	FLN; MNA; PCA	French Fourth Republic (1954–1958); French Fifth Republic (1958–1962); La Main Rouge; MPC; ANPA; FAF (1960–61); OAS (1961–62)
1954	Ongoing	Insurgency in Northeast India	India: Indian Armed Forces; Central Reserve Police Force; Border Security Force; SULFA; Supported by: Bhutan (from 2003); Bangladesh (from 1971); Myanmar (from 2018)	Separatist groups: UNLFW; National Democratic Front of Boroland (1986–2020); National Socialist Council of Nagaland; United Liberation Front of Asom; Kamtapur Liberation Organisation; CorCom; United National Liberation Front (1964–2023); People's Liberation Army of Manipur; Kangleipak Communist Party; People's Revolutionary Party of Kangleipak; Kanglei Yawol Kanna Lup; Maoist Communist Party of Manipur; Zomi Revolutionary Army (1997–2005); Kuki National Army; Tani Army; National Liberation Front of Tripura (1989–2024); All Tripura Tiger Force (1990–2024); Karbi Longri N.C. Hills Liberation Front (2004–21); Bodo Liberation Tigers Force (1996-03); Other: Garo National Liberation Army (2009–18); Hynniewtrep National Liberation Council (2000–10); People's Democratic Council of Karbi Longri (2016–21); Adivasi Cobra Force (1996–2012); Mizo National Front (1954–86); Tripura National Volunteers (1978–88); Dima Halam Daogah (2009–13); United People's Democratic Solidarity (1999–2014); Supported by: China (claimed by India); Myanmar (until 2018); Bhutan (until 2003); CPI (Maoist); Jihadist groups: MULT Assam (1996–2016); AQIS (2016–present)
1955	1955	Afghan tribal revolt of 1955	Afghanistan	Rebels
1955	1955	Calderonista invasion of Costa Rica	Costa Rica; Supported by: United States Organization of American States	Calderón forces Supported by: Nicaragua; Venezuela; Dominican Republic Guatemala (Diplomatic Support)
1955	1955	Revolución Libertadora	(Argentina) Antiperonist rebels: Argentine Navy; Argentine Air Force; Argentine Army; (Argentina) Argentine opposition	(Argentina) Argentine Government: Argentine Army; Argentine Air Force; (Argentina) Peronist Party; Nationalist Liberation Alliance
1955	1964	Bamileke War; Part of the decolonisation of Africa	Independence War Phase (1955–1960); France (1955–1960): French Cameroon; Civil War Phase (1960–1964); Federal Republic of Cameroon; France	Union of the Peoples of Cameroon; Supported by: People's Socialist Republic of Albania
1955	1957	Upper Yafa uprisings	United Kingdom	Rebels
1955	1972	First Sudanese Civil War; Part of the Sudanese Civil Wars and the South Sudanese wars of independence	SDF mutineers, bandits, and unaffiliated separatist militias ALF (1965–1970); Anyanya (from 1963); Israel (from 1969); Supported by: Ethiopia; Uganda (from about 1970) (Democratic Republic of the Congo) Congo-Léopoldville; Kenya; France	(Egypt) Anglo-Egyptian Sudan (1955–1956); Republic of the Sudan (1956–1969); Democratic Republic of the Sudan (1969–1972); Combat support: Uganda (Joint operations on Ugandan territory, 1965–1969); Libyan Arab Republic (From 1969 and combat involvement at least in 1970); Non-combat support: United Arab Republic; Soviet Union; United Kingdom; China; Yugoslavia; East Germany; Czechoslovakia; Saudi Arabia; Kingdom of Libya (until 1969); Algeria; United States; West Germany
1 November 1955	30 April 1975	Vietnam War; Part of the Indochina Wars and the Cold War in Asia	North Vietnam; Viet Cong and PRG; Pathet Lao; Khmer Rouge; GRUNK (from 1970); China (1965–1969); Soviet Union; North Korea	South Vietnam; United States; South Korea; Australia; New Zealand; Laos; Cambodia (1967–1970); Khmer Republic (1970–1975); Thailand; Philippines; Taiwan; Spain
1955	1959	Cyprus Emergency; Part of the Cyprus problem and Decolonisation	EOKA	United Kingdom: British Cyprus; Turkey: Special Warfare Department; Turkish Resistance Organisation
1956	1956	Hungarian Revolution of 1956; Part of the Cold War	Soviet Union; Until 28 October: Hungary; From 4 November: Kádár government	Hungarian revolutionaries; From 28 October: Hungary (Nagy government)
1956	1956	1956 Poznań protests Part of the Cold War	Polish People's Army; Internal Security Corps; Służba Bezpieczeństwa	Protesters
1956	1956	Suez Crisis Part of the Cold War and the Arab–Israeli conflict	Israel; United Kingdom; France	Egypt
1956	1956	Quỳnh Lưu uprising Part of the Cold War	(North Vietnam) North Vietnamese Army	Quỳnh Lưu's Christians
1957	1958	Ifni War; Part of the decolonisation of Africa	Morocco; Army of Liberation; Allied Sahrawi tribes	(Francoist Spain) Spain; (Francoist Spain) West Africa; (French Fourth Republic) France (1958); (French Fourth Republic) Mauritania
1957	1961	PRRI and Permesta rebellion	Indonesia	Revolutionary Government of the Republic of Indonesia; Permesta
Late 1950s	Late 1950s	Anti-taxation uprising in Afghanistan	Afghanistan	Hazara rebels
1958	1958	14 July Revolution; Part of the Arab Cold War	(Iraq) Free Officers: 19th Brigade; 20th Brigade	Arab Federation: Kingdom of Iraq; Royal Guard; Supported by: Kingdom of Jordan
1958	1958	1958 Lebanon crisis Part of the Cold War and the Arab Cold War	Government: Lebanese Armed Forces; Kataeb Party; Syrian Social Nationalist Party; ARF; Supported by: United States	Opposition: Najjadeh Party; Progressive Socialist Party; Lebanese Communist Party; Al-Mourabitoun; Supported by: United Arab Republic
1958	1958	Second Taiwan Strait Crisis Part of the Chinese Civil War and the Cold War	People's Republic of China	Republic of China; United States
1958	Ongoing	Ethnic conflict in Nagaland; Part of the Insurgency in Northeast India	India: Indian Armed Forces; Central Reserve Police Force; Border Security Force; State of Arunachal Pradesh: Arunachal Pradesh Police; State of Assam: Assam Police; State of Nagaland: Nagaland Police; State of Manipur: Manipur Police; Manipur Rifles; Myanmar: Sagaing Region; Tatmadaw; BGF; NSCN-IM: RNHPF (2013–17); NSCN-K (YA) (2017– ) NSCN-R (AC); ANLF RGN (1968–73)	NFA (Until 1980) NSCN (1980-88) NSCN Dissidents (1988-) NSCN-K (NS) (2020-) NSCN-K (AM) (2023-) NSCN-K (IS) (2023– ) Local Sumi militias ZUF; MNPF: MNRF (Until 2013); UNPC (Until 2013)
1958	1959	North Vietnamese invasion of Laos; Part of the Vietnam War and Laotian Civil War	North Vietnam (Laos) Pathet Lao	Laos
1958	1959	Mexico–Guatemala conflict Part of the Guatemala–Mexico relations	Guatemala	Mexico
1959	1959	Spirit Soldier rebellion (1959); Part of the resistance against the Great Leap Forward	China	"Regiment of Spirit Soldiers"
1959	1959	1959 Tibetan uprising Part of the Cold War	People's Republic of China: People's Liberation Army	Tibetan and Khampa protesters and guerrillas: Remnants of the Tibetan Army; Simultaneous rebellion in Kham and Amdo: Chushi Gangdruk; Supported by: Republic of China; United States (CIA); India (diplomatic)
1959	1959	1959 Mosul uprising Part of the Arab Cold War and Aftermath of the 14 July Revolution	(Iraq) Iraqi Government; Communist Party; Kurdistan Democratic Party; Arab, Kurdish, and Assyrian peasants	Arab nationalists: Ba'ath Party; (Arab Revolt) Sympathetic Arab tribes; Supported by: United Arab Republic; United States: CIA (alleged)
1959	1975	Laotian Civil War; Part of the Vietnam War, the Indochina Wars, and the Cold War in Asia	Pathet Lao; North Vietnam; Neutralists (1960–1962); Patriotic Neutralists (1963–1969)	Kingdom of Laos; Neutralists (1962–1966); United States; South Vietnam (until 1975); Thailand; Republic of China (until 1967)
1959	1965	Escambray rebellion Part of the consolidation of the Cuban Revolution	Government of Cuba; Supported by: Soviet Union	Insurgents: Anti-communists; Batista loyalists; Supported by: CIA (1959–1961); Dominican Republic (1960); Partido Auténtico
1959	1959	Pashtun Revolt in Kandahar	Afghanistan	Pashtun rebels
1959	1959	Upper Yafa disturbances	United Kingdom: Upper Yafa	Rebels Supported by: Yemen
1959	1959	Cuban invasion of Panama	Panama; United States; Guatemala	Cuba (Panama) Revolutionary Action Movement (Panama) May 22 Youth Revolutionary Movement
1959	1959	1959 Viqueque rebellion Part of the Cold War and the decolonization of Asia	(Portugal) Estado Novo	Permesta
1959	1959	Cuban invasion of the Dominican Republic	Dominican Republic	Cuba
1959	2011	Basque conflict Part of the European separatist movements in the Basque Country	Spain: Ertzaintza; National Police Corps; Spanish Army; Civil Guard; Armed Police Corps; Anti-Terrorist Liberation Groups (1983–1987); France: National Gendarmerie; National Police	Anti-communist paramilitaries: Spanish Basque Battalion (1975–1981); Anti-Communist Apostolic Alliance (1976–1983); Spanish Armed Groups (1979–1980); Warriors of Christ the King (1968–1980); Spanish National Action (unknown); ETA Anti-Terrorism (1970s); Anti-Marxist Commandos (unknown); Falange y Tradición (2009); Basque National Liberation Movement: Euskadi Ta Askatasuna; Iparretarrak (1972–2000); Iraultza (1982–1996); Autonomous Anti-Capitalist Commandos (late 1970s–1980s); Irrintzi (2005–2009); Kale borroka; Hordago (1980s); Euskal Zuzentasuna (1977–1979); Supported by: Provisional IRA (IRA)

== 1960–1969 ==
Started	Ended	Name of conflict	Belligerents	
Started	Ended	Name of conflict	Victorious party (if applicable)	Defeated party (if applicable)
1960	1965	Congo Crisis; Part of the decolonisation of Africa and the Cold War	1960–1963: (Democratic Republic of the Congo) Republic of the Congo; Supported by: Soviet Union (1960); (United Nations) ONUC (Note: ONUC, the United Nations Operation in the Congo, included troops from Ghana, Tunisia, Morocco, Ethiopia, Ireland, Guinea, Sweden, Mali, Sudan, Liberia, Canada, India, Indonesia and the United Arab Republic among others.); 1963–1965: Democratic Republic of the Congo; United States; Belgium; Supported by: (United Nations) ONUC (1964)	1960–1963: Katanga; South Kasai; Supported by: Belgium (Note: The secession of Katanga and South Kasai was also supported by South Africa, France, Portuguese Angola and the neighbouring Central African Federation. However, neither was ever officially recognised by any state.); 1960–1962: (Democratic Republic of the Congo) Free Republic of the Congo; Supported by: Soviet Union; 1963–1965: Kwilu and Simba rebels; Supported by: Soviet Union; China; Cuba
1960	1961	Bajaur Campaign; Part of the Afghanistan–Pakistan border conflict and the Cold War	Pakistan	Afghanistan
1960	1996	Guatemalan Civil War; Part of the Central American crisis and Cold War	Government of Guatemala and Guatemalan military Government-led paramilitary organizations: Mano Blanca; Supported by: United States (1962–1996); Argentina (1976–1983) Logistics: Israel; Taiwan; Chile; South Africa	URNG (from 1982); PGT (until 1998); MR-13 (1960–1971); FAR (1960–1971); EGP (1971–1996); ORPA (1979–1996); Supported by: Cuba; FMLN; Nicaragua (1979–1990)
1960	1961	1960–61 campaign at the China–Burma border Part of the cross-strait conflict, the internal conflict in Myanmar, and the Cold War in Asia	People's Republic of China Union of Burma	Republic of China
1960	1960	1960 Ethiopian coup d'état attempt Part of the Opposition to Haile Selassie	(Ethiopian Empire) Emperor Haile Selassie loyalists	Council of the Revolution: Kebur Zabagna
1961	1974	Angolan War of Independence; Part of the Portuguese Colonial War, the Decolonization of Africa and the Cold War	MPLA; Material support: Soviet Union; Cuba; East Germany; Romania; Bulgaria; Yugoslavia; Tanzania; Libya; Brazil; FNLA; UNITA (until 1972); Material support: United States; China; Romania; Israel; Bulgaria; Morocco; Brazil; Zambia; FLEC; RDL	Portugal; UNITA (after 1972); South Africa; Rhodesia
1961	1961	Bay of Pigs Invasion; Part of the Cold War and the Consolidation of the Cuban Revolution	Cuba	United States; Cuban DRF
1961	1962	French military rebellion in Algeria; Part of the Algerian War	France	OAS
1961	1990	Nicaraguan Revolution; Part of the Central American crisis and the Cold War in Latin America	FSLN: EPS; MAP-ML (1978–1979): MILPAS; Panama (1978–1979) Nicaragua: Junta of National Reconstruction (1979–1985); Supported by: Soviet Union (1980–1990); Costa Rica (1978–1982); Libya Mexico; Cuba; Bulgaria; Czechoslovakia (until 1989); East Germany (until 1989); Hungary (until 1989); Poland (until 1989); North Korea; PLO; Algeria; France; Sweden (medical support); Chile (1970–1973); Venezuela (1978–1979); Canada (1984–1990)	(Nicaragua) Somoza regime (1961–1979): National Guard; (Nicaragua) Contras (1979–1990): FDN; UDN; Fifteenth of September Legion; ARDE; MILPAS (after 1979); KISAN/YATAMA; RN; Supported by: United States; Costa Rica (1982–1986); Israel; Saudi Arabia; Panama (1981–1987); Chile (1973–1990) Argentina (1976–1983); Colombia; Imperial State of Iran (until 1979); Islamic Republic of Iran (Indirectly, since 1979); Brunei; People's Republic of China; Poland; Romania; Portugal
1961	1961	Bizerte crisis Part of the decolonisation of Africa and the spillover of the Algerian War	France	Tunisia
1961	1991	Eritrean War of Independence; Part of Opposition to Haile Selassie, the Ethiopian Civil War, the Cold War, the Sino-Soviet split, the conflicts in the Horn of Africa, and the Revolutions of 1989	ELF (1961–1981) Supported by: Sudan; Libya; China (until 1972); Cuba (until 1975); Syria; Iraq; Saudi Arabia; Somalia; EPLF (since 1973) (Tigray Region) TPLF (since 1975) Supported by: Libya; Sudan; Somalia; Syria; Iraq; Kuwait; United Arab Emirates	1961–1974; Ethiopian Empire Supported by: United States; Israel; 1974–1991; Derg (1974–1987); PDR Ethiopia (1987–1991) Supported by: Soviet Union (1974–1990); Cuba (1974–1990); South Yemen (1974–1990); Israel; North Korea
1961	1970	First Iraqi–Kurdish War; Part of the Iraqi–Kurdish conflict and the Arab–Israeli conflict	KDP; Supported by: Iran; Israel; United States (alleged)	Before 1968: Iraq; Syria (1963); Supported by: United States (from 1963); Egypt (1965) After 1968: Ba'athist Iraq
1961	1961	Rebellion of the Pilots	Elements of the Armed Forces still loyal to Trujillo	Dominican Air Force
1961	1961	1961 revolt in Somalia; Part of the conflicts in the Horn of Africa and the separatism in Somalia	Somali Republic	Pro-Somaliland coup plotters
1961	1961	Annexation of Goa; Part of the decolonisation of Asia and the Cold War	India	Portugal: Portuguese India
1961	1962	Operation Trikora; Part of the West New Guinea dispute and the Cold War in Asia	Netherlands; Dutch New Guinea	Indonesia; Soviet Union
1962	1964	Tuareg rebellion (1962–1964); Part of the Tuareg rebellions	Mali	Tuareg tribal and clan groups
1962	1962	El Carupanazo	(Venezuela) Venezuelan government	(Venezuela) Military rebels
1962	1962	El Porteñazo	(Venezuela) Venezuelan government	(Venezuela) Military rebels
1962	1963	1963 Argentine Navy revolt	Azules faction (most of the Army and the Air Force)	Colorados faction (mainly the Navy)
1962	1970	North Yemen Civil War	Yemen Arab Republic; Egypt	Kingdom of Yemen; Saudi Arabia
1962	Ongoing	Papua conflict Part of the West New Guinea dispute and Terrorism in Indonesia	Indonesia Papua New Guinea	Free Papua Movement
1962	1962	Sino-Indian War; Part of the Sino-Indian border dispute	China	India
1962	1990	Communist insurgency in Sarawak; Part of the Formation of Malaysia, Indonesia–Malaysia confrontation, Communist insurgency in Malaysia (1968–1989) and Cold War in Asia	Anti-communist forces: United Kingdom: Sarawak (until 1963); Malaysia: Sarawak (after 1963); Supported by: Australia; Brunei; New Zealand; United States Indonesia (after 1965) (Indo-Malay border)	Communist forces: North Kalimantan Communist Party: Sarawak People's Guerrilla Force (SPGF); North Kalimantan People's Army (NKPA); Indonesia (1962–65) (military aid); Other support: Brunei People's Party: North Kalimantan National Army (NKNA); Malayan Communist Party: Malayan National Liberation Army (MNLA); Supported by: China; North Vietnam (until 1975); North Korea
1962	1962	Brunei revolt Part of the beginning of Indonesia–Malaysia confrontation and Formation of Malaysia	United Kingdom; Brunei	Brunei People's Party
1963	Ongoing	Katanga insurgency Part of the Congo Crisis, First and Second Congo Wars, and other Congolese Civil Wars	Congo-Léopoldville (until 1971); Zaire (1971–1997); DR Congo (from 1997); ONUC (until 1964); MONUSCO (since 1999); Local self-defence groups	Katangese rebels: Katangese Gendarmerie (1960s); FLNC (1967–1991); Mai Mai Kata Katanga (since 2011); Mai Mai Gédéon; CORAK; CPK; Alleged Support: FARDC elements Katangese businessmen FDLR; Mai Mai Yakutumba; CNPSC
1963	1963	1963 Cuban invasion of Venezuela	Venezuela	Cuba
1963	1966	Indonesia–Malaysia confrontation Part of the formation of Malaysia and the Cold War in Asia	The Commonwealth of Nations; United Kingdom; Malaysia (Note: Before Federation, the three separate entities Malaya, Sarawak, and North Borneo participated independently); Singapore (Note: Until 1965); Brunei; Australia; New Zealand	Indonesia; Aligned parties: PKI; NKCP; PGRS; PRB
1963	1970	Bale revolt Part of the Ethiopian–Somali conflict, Opposition to Haile Selassie and Conflicts in the Horn of Africa	Ethiopian Empire; Supported by (since 1968): United States; United Kingdom	Oromo and Somali rebels Supported by (1963–1969): (Somalia) Somali Republic
1963	1974	Guinea-Bissau War of Independence; Part of the Portuguese Colonial War and the Cold War	PAIGC; Guinea (1970 only); Cuba	Portugal
1963	1963	Ramadan Revolution; Part of the Cold War and the Arab Cold War	Iraqi Ba'ath Party: Iraqi Armed Forces (Ba'athist elements); National Guard militia; Supported by: United States	Iraqi Government: Iraqi Armed Forces; Iraqi Communist Party
1963	1963	1963 Syrian coup d'état Part of the Arab Cold War	Ba'ath Party: Military Bureau	(Syria) Second Syrian Republic: National Party; People's Party; Muslim Brotherhood; Arab Liberation Movement
1963	1976	Dhofar Rebellion; Part of the Cold War and the Arab Cold War	(Muscat and Oman) Oman (Note: Muscat and Oman before 1970.); United Kingdom; Iran (1973–1976); Jordan; United Arab Emirates Support: Saudi Arabia (financial aid)	DLF (1963–1968); PFLOAG (1968–1974); NDFLOAG (1969–1971); PFLO (1974–1976) Support: South Yemen; Soviet Union; China; Cuba; North Korea; Iraq
1963	1963	Ar-Rashid revolt	(Iraq) Iraqi Government: Ba'ath Party; Ba'ath National Guard Militia	Iraqi Communist Party (Iraq) Iraqi Army
1963	1963	Sand War; Part of the Arab Cold War and the Cold War	Algeria; Support: Egypt; Cuba	Morocco; Support: France
1963	1967	Aden Emergency; Part of the Cold War, the Arab Cold War, and the decolonization of Asia	(Yemen) NLF	United Kingdom: Federation of South Arabia; Protectorate of South Arabia; FLOSY; Supported by: United Arab Republic
1963	1967	Shifta War; Part of the Somali–Kenyan conflict	Kenya Colony (until Dec. 1963); Kenya (from Dec. 1963); Supported by: United Kingdom; Ethiopian Empire	Northern Frontier Districts Liberation Movement: Hawiye group; Darod group; Supported by: Somalia; Soviet Union
1963	1963	November 1963 Iraqi coup d'état Part of the Cold War and the Arab Cold War	Nasserists	(Iraq) Ba'athists
1963	1965	Simba rebellion Part of the Congo Crisis and the Cold War	Democratic Republic of the Congo; Belgium; United States; Anyanya; Banyamulenge militias (1965)	Simba rebels: Gbenye-Olenga faction; Soumialot faction; Kabila-Massengo faction; Rwandan exile groups Uganda; Sudan Foreign support: Soviet Union; Cuba; Tanganyika; China; Burundi; Egypt; Algeria
1964	1964	Zanzibar Revolution; Part of the Cold War	(Zanzibar) Revolutionaries: Afro-Shirazi Party; Umma Party	Sultanate of Zanzibar
1964	1964	1964 Ethiopian–Somali Border War; Part of the Ethiopian–Somali conflict and the Cold War]	(Ethiopian Empire) Ethiopia; Supported by: United States	(Somalia) Somalia; Supported by: (United Arab Republic) Egypt
1964	1964	1964 Brazilian coup d'état Part of the Cold War	Armed Forces (rebel); Supported by: State governors: Alagoas; Espírito Santo; Guanabara; Minas Gerais; Paraná; Rio Grande do Sul; São Paulo; Congressional opposition United States	(Brazil) Brazilian Government; Armed Forces (loyalist); Supported by: State governors: Pernambuco; Sergipe; National Union of Students Peasant Leagues
1964	Ongoing	Colombian conflict Part of the Cold War (1964–1991), the war on drugs (1971–present) and the war on terror (2001–present)	Colombia; Supported by: Peru; Panama; Mexico; Brazil; Ecuador; United States; Spain; United Kingdom	Colombian drug cartels and paramilitaries: La Oficina Cartel (1993–); Clan del Golfo (2001–); Los Rastrojos (2004–); Los Pachenca (2006–); Black Eagles (2006–2011); Ex-FARC Mafia (Since 2016 or 2017); AUC (1997–08); AAA (1978–99); CONVIVIR (1994–07); ACCU (1964–2009); Los Paisas (2008–14); Libertadores del Vichada (2010–17); Bloque Meta (2010–17); ERPAC (1964–2010); Cali Cartel (1975–95); Medellín Cartel (1972–93); Norte del Valle Cartel (1985–2008); North Coast Cartel (1980–2010); MAS (1981–90); La Empresa Cartel (1990– ); La Guajira Cartel (1990– ); Supported by: Contras (1979–90) Mexican drug cartels and paramilitaries: Sinaloa Cartel (1990–); Tijuana Cartel (1987–); CJNG (2009–); Gulf Cartel (1986–); Juárez Cartel (1989–); Los Zetas (1997–); BLO (2008–14); Guadalajara Cartel (1978–89); La Familia Michoacana (1980s–2011); Milenio Cartel (1995–2010); Colombian rebel guerrilla groups: ELN (1964–); FARC dissidents (2016–); EPL/Los Pelusos (1967–); FARIP (1987–1996); FARC (1964–2017); ERP (1985–2007); CGSB (1987–90); M-19 (1974–90); MOEC (1964–95); MAQL (1984–91); ERC (1964–92); ERG (1964–2008); PRT (1964–91); Supported by: Venezuela; Cuba; Belarus (from 2008); Nicaragua (alleged); Libya (until 2011); Soviet Union (until 1989); Albania (financial support; 1960s–1970s); Cartel of the Suns; FBL; Shining Path (factions); ETA (1964–2018); PIRA (1969–98); PKK
1964	1979	Rhodesian Bush War; Part of the Cold War and decolonisation of Africa	ZANU (ZANLA); ZAPU (ZIPRA); (People's Republic of Mozambique) Mozambique; ANC (MK); Zambia	Rhodesia (1964–1979); Zimbabwe Rhodesia (1979); Portugal (1964–1974) (Note: Portuguese forces assisted the Rhodesians in cross-border operations into Portuguese Mozambique. See Operation Flotilla and Operation Birch.); South Africa (from 1967)
1964	1992	FULRO insurgency Part of the Persecution of the Montagnard in Vietnam, Racism in Vietnam, Vietnam War (until 1975), Cambodian Civil War (until 1975), Cambodian–Vietnamese War, (until 1991) insurgency in Laos, and the Cold War (until 1991)	Communist forces: North Vietnam (1964–1976) (Provisional Revolutionary Government of the Republic of South Vietnam) Viet Cong (until 1975); Vietnam (after 1976); People's Republic of Kampuchea (1979-1989) Khmer Rouge (1967-1975)	FULRO: BAJARAKA; FLC; FLHP; FLKK; Supported by: China; Cambodia; Khmer Republic (1970–1975); GRUNK; Khmer Rouge (1975–1992); United States (1970–1975); France (1974–1992) Anti-communist forces: South Vietnam (1964–1975); United States (1964–1972)
1964	1974	Mozambican War of Independence; Part of the Portuguese Colonial War, the Decolonisation of Africa, and the Cold War	FRELIMO; COREMO Support: Soviet Union; Cuba; Czechoslovakia; East Germany; Sweden; Romania; Bulgaria; China; Yugoslavia; Tanzania; Somalia; Zambia; Egypt; Algeria; Morocco; Libya; Senegal; Guinea; Brazil	Portugal Support: South Africa; Rhodesia; Malawi; Israel
1964	1982	Mexican Dirty War; Part of the Cold War	Mexico: Institutional Revolutionary Party; DFS – Security Directorate (Intelligence); Armed Forces (Military); Judicial Police (Law enforcement); United States (small arms, ammunition, and explosives, as well as supporting the Mexican government and asking for action against leftists)	Far-left groups: Mexican Communist Party; People's Guerrilla Group; Party of the Poor; National Revolutionary Civic Association; Liga Comunista 23 de Septiembre; National Liberation Forces; Various other social and armed movements in the country
1965	1965	Dominican Civil War; Part of the Cold War	Loyalist faction United States IAPF: Brazil; Paraguay; Nicaragua; Costa Rica; El Salvador; Honduras	Constitutionalist faction: Dominican Revolutionary Party; Social Christian Revolutionary Party; June 14th Revolutionary Movement
1965	1966	American occupation of the Dominican Republic (1965–66)	United States (pro-government state intervener); Organization of American States (OAS)	(Dominican Republic) Constitutionalists
1965	1965	Indo-Pakistani War of 1965 Part of the Indo-Pakistani wars and conflicts and Cold War	India	Pakistan
1965	1965	30 September Movement; Part of the Cold War in Asia, Konfrontasi and the transition to the New Order	Government of Indonesia; Indonesian Army (Loyalist factions); Indonesian Army (Suharto factions) Supported by: United Kingdom; United States	30 September Movement; Tjakrabirawa; Angkatan kelima in Lubang Buaya; Communist Party of Indonesia; Indonesian Air Force (Denied, but suspected by the army); Supported by: China
1965	1983	Communist insurgency in Thailand; Part of the Cold War and Indochina Wars	Thailand: Royal Thai Armed Forces; Royal Thai Police; Border Patrol Police; Volunteer Defense Corps; Thahan Phran; Internal Security Operations Command; Village Scouts; Nawaphon; Red Gaurs; Kingdom of Laos (until 1975); ROC 93rd Division; Malaysia; Supported by: United States; Shan United Revolutionary Army; Karen National Union	Communist Party of Thailand: People's Liberation Army of Thailand; Federation of Farmers and Workers; National Student Center of Thailand; Ethnic groups, especially the Hmong; Pathet Lao; Malayan Communist Party; Communist Party of Burma; Supported by: Khmer Rouge (until 1978); People's Republic of Kampuchea (since 1979); People's Republic of China (until 1980); North Vietnam
1965	1979	Chadian Civil War (1965–1979); Part of the Cold War	FROLINAT (from 1966): First Liberation Army (until 1975); Second Liberation Army (1968–76); Third Liberation Army (from 1968); Various splinter factions; (Chad) FLT (until 1975) (Chad) Volcan Army (from 1970) (Chad) FAP (from 1976) (Chad) FAN (1976–78, 1979); Tribal and peasant rebels (Libyan Arab Republic) (History of Libya under Muammar Gaddafi) Libya (1969–72, from 1975); Supported by: Algeria; Kingdom of Libya (non-combat, until 1969)	Chad: Chadian Armed Forces; FROLINAT's First Liberation Army (c. 1975); FAN (1978–79); France; Supported by: Egypt; Israel
1966	1967	Guerrilha do Caparaó	Brazil	Rebels
1966	1977	Crisis in French Somaliland	FLCS	France: French Somaliland
1966	1967	Stanleyville mutinies	Congo-Léopoldville	Armée Nationale Congolaise (ANC) mutineers
1966	1990	South African Border War; Part of the Cold War and the decolonisation of Africa	SWAPO (PLAN); MPLA (FAPLA); Cuba; SWANU; ANC (MK); Zambia; Military advisers and pilots: Soviet Union; East Germany	South Africa: TGNU (1985–1989); Portugal (until 1974); UNITA (from 1975); FNLA (1975)
1966	1969	Korean DMZ Conflict; Part of the Korean conflict and the Cold War	South Korea; United States	North Korea
1966	1967	Ñancahuazú Guerrilla War; Part of the Cold War	Bolivia; United States	ELN; Cuba
1967	1968	1967 Kurdish revolt in Iran; Part of the Iranian-Kurdish conflict	Imperial State of Iran; SAVAK	Revolutionary Committee leadership: Kurdish tribesmen KDP-I
1966	1975	Araguaia Guerrilla War; Part of the armed struggle against the Brazilian military dictatorship	Brazilian military government; • Brazilian Army; • Brazilian Air Force; • Brazilian Navy	Communist Party of Brazil; Supported by: People's Socialist Republic of Albania
1967	1975	Cambodian Civil War Part of the Vietnam War, the Indochina Wars, the Sino-Soviet Split, and the Cold War in Asia	Khmer Rouge; GRUNK (1970–1975); FUNK; Khmer Rumdo; North Vietnam; Viet Cong; Pathet Lao	Cambodia (1967–1970); Khmer Republic (1970–1975); Khmer Serei (until 1972); United States; South Vietnam; Laos FULRO
1967	1967	Machurucuto raid	Venezuelan National Guard; Venezuelan Army	Revolutionary Left Movement; Cuban guerrillas Supported by: Cuba
1967	Ongoing	Naxalite–Maoist insurgency	India; Indian Armed Forces; Central Reserve Police Force; Border Security Force; State Armed Police Forces; District Reserve Guard; Militias: (until 2011): Tritiya Prastuti Committee; Salwa Judum; Sunlight Sena; Kuer Sena; Ranvir Sena; Bhumi Sena; Lorik Sena	Naxalites; CPI (Maoist); PLGA; JJP; PLFI; RCC (2006–2019); OMP (2002–2015); CPI(ML) Liberation (1974–1992); Lal Sena; CPI(ML) Janashakti (1992–2013); CPUSI (1997–2005); CPI(ML) ND; CPI(ML) MM (until 2012); ABNES (until 2002); TNLA (until 2005); Supported by: ULFA; NSCN; PLA-MP; MCPM; KCP; Declared support: International Communist League; CPN (Maoist); CPN (2014); NPA; PBSP (until 2021); PBCP (until 2021); CIC (until 1977); CCP (Maoist) (until 1976)
1967	1967	Six-Day War Part of the Arab–Israeli conflict and the Cold War	Israel	Egypt; Syria; Jordan; Iraq; Minor involvement: Lebanon
1967	1970	War of Attrition Part of the Arab–Israeli conflict and the Cold War	Israel	Egypt; Soviet Union; Kuwait; PLO; Jordan; Syria; Cuba
1967	1970	Nigerian Civil War; Part of the Cold War and the decolonisation of Africa	Nigeria; Egypt (Note: Close air support); Supported by: United Kingdom; Soviet Union; Ethiopia	Biafra; Republic of Benin; Supported by: China; Tanzania; Zambia; Gabon; Ivory Coast; Covert support: France; Portugal; Israel; South Africa; Rhodesia
1967	1967	Nathu La and Cho La clashes	India	China
1967	1974	PGRS/Paraku Rebellion	Indonesia	PGRS/Paraku
1968	2019	Moro conflict Part of the Cold War, Civil conflict in the Philippines, war on terror, North Borneo dispute and War against the Islamic State	Philippines Supported by: United States (advisors); Australia; Indonesia; Malaysia (since 2001); Russia; China; International Monitoring Team (IMT): Brunei; Indonesia; Japan; Libya; Malaysia; Norway; European Union; Ilaga	Bangsamoro: MNLF (until 1996); MILF (until 2014); Former support: Libya (until 2011); Malaysia (until 2001); NDFP: MRLO; Jihadist groups: BIFF; ASG (1991–2024); Maute group (2013–2017); AKP (2014 – c. 2021); KIM (2011–2013); Rajah Sulaiman Movement (until 2005)
1968	1989	Communist insurgency in Malaysia (1968–1989); Part of the Cold War in Asia and continuation of the Malayan Emergency	Anti-communist forces: Malaysia; Singapore; Thailand; Supported by: United Kingdom; New Zealand; Indonesia (from 1965)	Communist forces: Malayan Communist Party: Malayan National Liberation Army; Communist Party of Malaya/Revolutionary Faction (1970–1983); Communist Party of Malaya/Marxist–Leninist (1974–1983); Malaysian Communist Party (1983–1987); North Kalimantan Communist Party; Communist Party of Thailand (until 1983); Supported by: China (until 1976) Soviet Union; Indonesia (1962–1965)
1968	1968	Warsaw Pact invasion of Czechoslovakia; Part of the Cold War and the Prague Spring	Warsaw Pact: Soviet Union; Poland; Bulgaria; Hungary; Logistics support: East Germany (Note: Invasion cancelled, troops prepared, part of the executive staff)	Czechoslovakia Supported by: Albania; Romania; China; Yugoslavia
1960s	1998 (Note: The exact starting date of the Troubles is disputed; the most common dates proposed include the formation of the modern Ulster Volunteer Force in 1966, the civil rights march in Derry on 5 October 1968, the beginning of the 'Battle of the Bogside' on 12 August 1969 or the deployment of British troops on 14 August 1969.)	The Troubles	Irish republican paramilitaries: Provisional IRA (PIRA); Irish National Liberation Army (INLA); Official IRA (OIRA); Continuity IRA (CIRA); Real IRA (RIRA); Irish People's Liberation Organisation (IPLO); Ulster loyalist paramilitaries: Ulster Defence Association (UDA); Ulster Volunteer Force (UVF); Red Hand Commando (RHC); Ulster Resistance (UR); Loyalist Volunteer Force (LVF); Ulster Protestant Volunteers (UPV)	State security forces: British Armed Forces; Royal Ulster Constabulary; Irish Defence Forces; Gardaí
1968	1988	Years of Lead (Italy); Part of the Cold War	(Italy) Italian government: SISMI; SISDE; Armed Forces; Carabinieri; State Police; Supported by: (NATO) Gladio; CIA	Far-left terrorists: Red Brigades (Note: Disbanded by police.); Front Line (Note: Disbanded by members due to increasing police pressure. Most already joined the Red Brigades; others focused on politics.); October 22 Group (Note: Dismantled by police. Members merged into the Red Brigades and Partisan Action Groups.); PAC (Note: Dismantled by police.); Continuous Struggle (Note: Disbanded due to internal feuds. Some members merged into the Red Brigades whilst others formed Prima Linea.); Workers' Power (Note: Disbanded due to internal disagreements. Some members merged into the group Autonomous Worker.); Workers' Autonomy (Note: Dissolved due to police pressure and members merging into the PAC, Red Brigades, and Prima Linea. Those imprisoned often associated with NAP.); Supported by: RAF; Sigurimi (alleged); (Palestine Liberation Organization) PLO (alleged); KGB (alleged); (East Germany) Stasi (alleged); Mukhabarat el-Jamahiriya (alleged); UDBA (alleged); Far-right terrorists: New Order (Note: Banned, some joined Ordine Nero.); National Vanguard (Note: Banned. Its members joined Ordine Nero.); Black Order; NAR (Note: Dismantled.); Third Position (Note: Dissolved by police. Used by NAR as a cover name later on.); Supported by: Propaganda Due; SISMI (factions); CIA; Greek Junta; Magliana Gang; Sicilian Mafia (alleged)
1968	1971	1968–1971 East Pakistan communist insurgency	Pakistan	PBSA
1969	1969	Rupununi Uprising	(Guyana (1966–1970)) Guyana: Guyana Defence Force	Rupununi rebels Support: Venezuela (alleged)
1969	1969	Sino-Soviet border conflict Part of the Cold War and the Sino-Soviet split	China	Soviet Union
1969	Ongoing	Communist rebellion in the Philippines; Part of the Civil conflict in the Philippines	Philippines; United States; Anti-communist militia: Alsa Masa (1986–?)	CPP * NPA; MLPP-RHB; APP; RPA; ABB; CPLA Support: People's Republic of China (1969–1976); Libya (1980s–2011); North Korea (Alleged); Vietnam (1980s)
1969	1969	Football War	El Salvador	Honduras
1969	1969	Al-Wadiah War; Part of the Arab Cold War	Saudi Arabia; Supported by: Pakistan (air support)	South Yemen

== 1970–1979 ==
Started	Ended	Name of conflict	Belligerents	
Started	Ended	Name of conflict	Victorious party (if applicable)	Defeated party (if applicable)
1970	1971	Reggio revolt Part of the Years of Lead	Government of Italy; Christian Democracy (National); Italian Communist Party; Italian Socialist Party; CGIL	Christian Democracy (Calabrian); Italian Social Movement; National Vanguard; Italian Democratic Socialist Party; Italian Anarchist Federation; CISNAL
1970	1971	Black September; Part of the Arab Cold War	Jordan: Jordanian Armed Forces	PLO: Fatah; Popular Front for the Liberation of Palestine (PFLP); Democratic Front for the Liberation of Palestine (DFLP); Syria (until November 1970): Syrian Armed Forces; Palestine Liberation Army (PLA); Supported by: Organization of Iranian People's Fedai Guerrillas (OIPFG); People's Mojahedin Organization of Iran (MEK)
1970	1970	Corrective Movement (Syria); Part of the Arab Cold War	(Syria) Syrian Arab Armed Forces	(Syria) Syrian Government: Ba'ath Party
1970	1970	Teoponte Guerrilla; Part of the Cold War	Bolivia	ELN (Teoponte)
1971	1971	1971 Ugandan coup d'état Part of the Cold War	(Uganda) Ugandan putschists: Rebel military faction; Rebel police faction; Supported by: Israel	(Uganda) Ugandan government: Loyal state institutions
1971	1971	Bangladesh Liberation War Part of the independence of Bangladesh, the Indo-Pakistani conflicts, and the Cold War	Bangladesh; India (3–16 Dec.)	Pakistan
1971	1971	1971 JVP insurrection Part of the Cold War	Ceylon: (Dominion of Ceylon) Sri Lankan Coalition (from 15 May); SLFP; CCP (Pro-Soviet); LSSP; Military intervention: India; Pakistan; Soviet Union	JVP; Supported by: North Korea; Albania (arms support); China (alleged); ASBPI; CCP (Maoist) (alleged); Diplomatic support: South Yemen
1971	1971	Seizure of Abu Musa and the Greater and Lesser Tunbs; Part of the Unification of the United Arab Emirates	Imperial State of Iran	Emirate of Sharjah; Emirate of Ras al-Khaimah
1972	1981	Eritrean Civil Wars; Part of the Eritrean War of Independence, the Ethiopian Civil War and conflicts in the Horn of Africa	EPLF (Tigray Region) TPLF	ELF
1972	1975	1972–1975 Bangladesh insurgency Part of the Cold War in Asia	Government of Bangladesh: Awami League/BAKSAL (1972–75); Chhatra League; Sramik League; Military-Supreme Court Administration (1975); Mujibist insurgents: (Note: During Khondaker Mostaq Ahmed's military junta and Abu Sadat Mohammad Sayem's interim government): (Bangladesh) Kader Bahini; (Bangladesh) Pro-Mujibist military factions; East Bengal Regiment (factions); 46th Independent Infantry Brigade	Socialist insurgents: Jatiya Samajtantrik Dal; Jasad Chhatra League; Maoist insurgents: Purba Banglar Sarbahara Party; Anti-Mujibist military factions: 2nd Field Artillery; Bengal Lancers; 1st Bengal Cavalry; 10th Bengal Regiment (factions); Other anti-Mujibist factions: Trade unionists (Note: Non-BJSL aligned trade unionists were considered enemies by the BAKSAL regime); Awami League (factions); Military junta of Bangladesh (1975) (Note: From 15 August to 6 November)
1972	Ongoing	Maoist insurgency in Turkey	Government of Turkey	TKP/ML: TİKKO; MKP; Maoist Party Centre
1972	1972	1972 invasion of Uganda	Uganda; Libya; Palestine Liberation Organization (PLO)	Ugandan rebels: People's Army; UPC supporters; Tanzania
1973	1973	1973 Samita border skirmish Part of Iraq–Kuwait relations	Iraq	Kuwait
1973	1977	1970s operation in Balochistan; Part of the Insurgency in Balochistan and the Cold War	Pakistan; Iran Supported by: (Muscat and Oman) Oman	Baloch separatists (Afghanistan) Pashtun Zalmay
1973	1973	1973 Chilean coup d'état Part of the Cold War in South America	Chilean Armed Forces: Chilean Army; Chilean Navy; Chilean Air Force; Carabineros de Chile; Supported by: Nationals; Christian Democrats (parts); Radical Democrats; United States (Note: The United States was not involved in the logistics and planification of the 11th September, 1973 coup but wanted the fall of Allende and helped opposition groups marginally.); Canada; Australia; United Kingdom	(Chile) Chilean Government: Popular Unity; GAP; Revolutionary Left Movement; Other working-class militants Supported by: Cuba
1968	1988	Armed resistance in Chile (1973–1990); Part of the Operation Condor and the Cold War	Junta Chilean Armed Forces: Chilean Army; Chilean Navy; Chilean Air Force; Police forces: Carabineros de Chile; PDI; DINA (1974–1977); CNI (1977–1990); Political support: RN; PN; AN; UDI; Supported by: Israel; South Africa; Francoist Spain; Rhodesia; Brazil; India; South Korea; China; Uruguay; West Germany; United States (until 1976) (Note: The Kennedy Amendment to the Foreign Assistance Act (1976) created an US. weapon embargo against Chile)	Guerrillas MIR (1973–1987); FPMR (1983–1997); MAPU Lautaro (1982–1994); MIR-EGP-PL (1987–1994); GAP (1973); Cordones industriales (1973) Political support: PSCh; PCCh; Supported by: Nicaragua; Cuba; Libya; Soviet Union; North Korea; EPR (Argentina); Tupamaros (Uruguay); ELN (Bolivia)
1973	1973	Yom Kippur War Part of the Arab–Israeli conflict and the Cold War	Israel	Egypt; Syria; Expeditionary forces Saudi Arabia Algeria Jordan Libya Iraq Kuwait Tunisia Morocco Cuba North Korea
1973	Ongoing	Oromo conflict Part of the Ethiopian Civil War and Ethiopian civil conflict (2018–present)	Ethiopia; Former combatants: Ethiopian Empire (until 1975); Derg (1975–87); PDRE (1987–91); TGE (1991–95)	OLF (until 2018); OLA (initially part of OLF, independent from 2018); IFLO (1985–87); EUPF (1993–2012); Supported by: (Note: Alleged by the government of Ethiopia.); Eritrea (1998–2018); Egypt (alleged)
1974	1974	Battle of the Paracel Islands Part of the Vietnam War	China: People's Liberation Army Navy of China	South Vietnam: Republic of Vietnam Navy
1974	1974	Arube uprising	Ugandan government	Putschists
1974	1975	Second Iraqi–Kurdish War; Part of the Iraqi–Kurdish conflict and the Cold War	Iraq; Supported by: Soviet Union	KDP; Iran; Supported by: Israel; United States
1974	1975	1974–75 Shatt al-Arab conflict Part of the Arvand River dispute and the Second Iraqi–Kurdish War	Iran KDP	Iraq
1974	1974	Turkish invasion of Cyprus; Part of the Cold War and Cyprus problem	Turkey; (Turkey) Turkish Resistance Organisation	Republic of Cyprus; EOKA B; Greece
1974	1991	Ethiopian Civil War; Part of the Eritrean War of Independence, the Ethiopian–Somali conflict, the Oromo conflict, the Cold War, and the Revolutions of 1989	EPRDF: (Tigray Region) TPLF; (Amhara Region) EPDM; OPDO; EPRP; MEISON (from 1977); EDU; OLF; WSLF; ALF; Eritrean separatists: ELF (until 1981); EPLF; Somali nationalists: WSLF; ONLF Supported by: United States; Somalia (1978–1991); China (from 1978); (Socialist Republic of Romania) Romania (1978–1989)	Derg (1974–1987); PDR Ethiopia; Supported by: Soviet Union (1974–1990); Cuba (1974–1990); South Yemen (1974–1990); Somali anti-Barre groups: (Somalia) USC; SSDF; SPM; SNM
1974	1983	Dirty War; Part of the Cold War and Operation Condor	Argentina: Argentine Army; Argentine Navy; Argentine Air Force; Secretariat of Intelligence; Argentine Federal Police; Argentine National Gendarmerie; Argentine Naval Prefecture; Argentine Anticommunist Alliance; Justicialist Party (Right-wing faction); Supported by: Bolivia; Brazil; Chile; Paraguay; Peru; Uruguay; United States; France; Israel	ERP (1973–1979); Montoneros (1974–1980); FAP; Resistencia Libertaria; Supported by: Cuba
1975	1975	1975 Panjshir Valley uprising	Republic of Afghanistan	Forces loyal to Ahmad Shah Massoud
1975	1975	1975 China-India border skirmish	China	India
1975	Ongoing	Cabinda War; Part of the Angolan Civil War (until 2002)	Angola; Cuba (until 1991) Democratic People's Republic of Angola (1991): UNITA (joint operations, 1991); Military advisers and pilots: East Germany (until 1989); Soviet Union (until 1989)	FLEC: FLEC-FAC; Communist Committee of Cabinda; Republic of Cabinda (1975–1976, 1999); Zaire (1975)
1975	2002	Angolan Civil War; Part of the aftermath of the Angolan War of Independence, and the Cold War (until 1991)	People's Republic of Angola/Republic of Angola: MPLA; Cuba (1975–1989); SWAPO (1975–1989); ANC (1975–1989); Executive Outcomes (1993–1995); FLNC (1975–2001); Namibia (2001–2002) (Note: Irritated by UNITA cross-border raids, the Namibian Defence Force retaliated by sending units into southern Angola and destroying a UNITA training camp at Licua in late January 2001. The Namibian troops were not withdrawn from Angola until May 2002.) Military advisers and pilots: Soviet Union (1975–1989); East Germany (1975–1989); North Korea (1980s) (Note: The North Korean Military Mission in Angola had about 1,500 personnel attached to FAPLA in 1986, most likely advisers, although their exact duties are uncertain. Their presence in Angola may have been indirectly subsidised by the Soviet Union. Up to 3,000 North Korean military personnel served in Angola throughout the 1980s.)	Democratic People's Republic of Angola: UNITA; FNLA (1975–1976); FNLA (1976–1978); South Africa (1975–1989); Zaire (1975) FLEC
1975	1979	PUK insurgency Part of the Iraqi–Kurdish conflict	Iraq	PUK KDP
1975	1990 (Note: The last battle took place from 2–6 July 1991 between the Lebanese government and the Palestine Liberation Organization due to the latter's refusal to accept the Taif Agreement.)	Lebanese Civil War; Part of the Cold War, Arab Cold War, Arab–Israeli conflict, Iran–Israel and Iran–Saudi proxy wars	Lebanese Front: Kataeb Party; Lebanese Forces; Marada Brigades (until 1978) Guardians of the Cedars Al-Tanzim Lebanese Youth Movement (MKG) Tyous Team of Commandos Zahliote Group Shuraya Party Vanguard of the Maani Army (MDJ) (Other minor organizations); Army of Free Lebanon (until 1977); SLA (from 1976); Israel (from 1978) Tigers Militia (until 1980)	Lebanese National Movement (1975–1982) Jammoul (1982–1990): Al-Mourabitoun; Progressive Socialist Party (PSP); Lebanese Communist Party (LCP); Syrian Social Nationalist Party in Lebanon (SSNP); Communist Action Organization in Lebanon (OCAL); Lebanese Movement in Support of Fatah (LMSF); Arab Socialist Ba'ath Party – Lebanon Region; Revolutionary Communist Group; Sixth of February Movement; Socialist Arab Lebanon Vanguard Party (SALVP) Popular Nasserist Organization (PNO) Lebanese Arab Army (LAA) Other minor organizations; PLO (1975–1983); ASALA Hezbollah (1985–1990); Iran (from 1980, mainly IRGC and Army paramilitary units) Islamic Unification Movement (from 1982) Syria (1976, 1983–1991); Amal Movement; PNSF; Marada Brigades (left LF in 1978; aligned with Syria) Lebanese Armed Forces UNIFIL (from 1978); Multinational Force in Lebanon (1982–1984): United States; UK; France; Italy; Arab Deterrent Force (1976–1982) List: Saudi Arabia (1976–1979); Sudan (1976–1979); UAE (1976–1979); Libya (1976 only); South Yemen (1976–1977)
1975	1991	Western Sahara War; Part of the Western Sahara conflict	Morocco; Mauritania (1975–1979); Supported by: United States; France (1977–1978, aid from 1978); Saudi Arabia	Sahrawi Republic; Supported by: Algeria (1976, aid from 1976); Libya (1976–1984)
1975	Ongoing	Insurgency in Laos; Part of the Third Indochina War	Lao PDR: Lao People's Revolutionary Party; Supported by: Vietnam: Vietnam People's Army (alleged direct involvement and intervention); Soviet Union (until 1989)	Lao Resistance Movement; Hmong insurgents; Supported by: Thailand (until 1990); United States (until 1990); (Kingdom of Laos) Neo Hom (1981–2007); Royalists: Lao National Liberation Front; Royal Lao Democratic Government (1982); Supported by: Royal Lao Government in Exile; China (until 1988) (Cambodia) Khmer Rouge (until 1999): (Cambodia) Democratic Kampuchea (until 1979); (Cambodia) Party of Democratic Kampuchea (1981–1990); Rightists: United Front for the Liberation of Laos; Supported by: Thailand (early to mid–1980s)
1975	1976	Indonesian invasion of East Timor; Part of the Cold War in Asia and the decolonisation of Asia (from 28 November)	Indonesia; ABRI; PGET; UDT; APODETI	East Timor; FRETILIN (FALINTIL)
1976	Early 1980s	Rebellion of the Lost	Brazil	Rebels
1976	1982	Islamist uprising in Syria; Part of the Arab Cold War and Assadist–Saddamist conflict	Syria; Supported by: Soviet Union	Fighting Vanguard; Muslim Brotherhood (after mid-1979); Pro-Iraqi Ba'athists; Supported by: Ba'athist Iraq (1980–1982); Jordan; West Germany
1976	2005	Insurgency in Aceh	Indonesia; Indonesian National Armed Forces; Indonesian National Police	Free Aceh Movement
1976	Ongoing	Corsican conflict	France: French Armed Forces (1 barracks on Corsica); National Gendarmerie; National Police; Municipal Police; Anti-separatist paramilitaries: Front d'Action Nouvelle Contre l'Indépendance et l'Autonomie; Criminal groups: Corsican mafia	Corsican Separatist Paramilitaries National Liberation Front of Corsica (FLNC) FLNC-Canal Historique (FLNC-CS) (1988–1998) FLNC-Canal Habituel (FLNC-CA) (1988–1997) Resistenza (1989–2003) Fronte Ribellu (1996–1999) FLNC-5 Maghju (FLNC-5M) (1996–1999) Armata Corsa (AC) (1999–2001) FLNC-Unione di i Cumbattenti (FLNC-UC) (1999–present) FLNC-22 Uttrovi (FLNC-22U) (2002–present) Armata di U Populu Corsu (APC) (2004–2006) FLNC-5 Maghju 1976 (FLNC-1976) (2007–present) FLNC-21 Maghju (FLNC-21M) (2021–present) Other small groups
1968	1980	Political violence in Turkey (1976–1980); Part of the Cold War	Nationalist Right-wing groups: Grey Wolves (MHP); Turkish Revenge Brigade; Turkish mafia; TÜRK-İŞ; MİSK (MHP) Islamist Right-wing groups: Raiders Organization (MSP); Turkish National Student Union; ---- Centre-right groups: Justice Party; Republican Reliance Party; Supported by: Counter-Guerrilla	Far-left groups: DEV-GENÇ; TİİKP; TKP/ML (TİKKO); THKO; DEV-YOL; THKP-C/MLSPB; THKP-C; Progressive Youth Association (TKP); DİSK; Liberation Movement; People's Path; DEV-SOL; Left-wing groups: Workers' Party of Turkey; Unity Party Centre-left groups: Republican People's Party
1977	1977	1977 Shia uprising in Iraq	Ba'athist Iraq	Iraqi rebels
1977	1992	Mozambican Civil War; Part of the aftermath of the Mozambican War of Independence, and the Cold War	Mozambique (People's Republic until 1990): FRELIMO; UNAMO (1988–1992); ZANU (until 1979); Zimbabwe (from 1980); Soviet Union; Tanzania; Malawi (from 1987)	RENAMO; PRM (merged with RENAMO in 1982); UNAMO (1987–1988); COREMO; UNIPOMO; FUMO; Rhodesia (until 1979): Ex-Flechas; South Africa (from 1978)
1977	1977	Shaba I Part of the Shaba Invasions and the Cold War	Zaire; Morocco; Egypt; France; Belgium; Supported by: United States; Saudi Arabia; Sudan; Nigeria	Congolese National Liberation Front (FNLC) Supported by: Angola; Cuba; Soviet Union; East Germany
1977	1978	Ogaden War; Part of the Ethiopian Civil War, the Ethiopian–Somali conflict, and the Cold War	Ethiopia; Cuba; Soviet Union; South Yemen	Somalia; WSLF
1977	1977	Egyptian–Libyan War; Part of the Arab Cold War	Egypt	Libya
1977	Ongoing	Chittagong Hill Tracts conflict Part of the Cold War and Terrorism in Bangladesh	First phase (1977–1997): Bangladesh; Second phase (2022–present): Bangladesh; PCJSS-MN Larma; UPDF-D	First phase (1977–1997): Parbatya Chattagram Jana Samhati Samiti; Logistical support: India; Second phase (2022–present): PCJSS UPDF Second phase (2022–present): Kuki-Chin National Front
1978	1979	Iranian Revolution; Part of Constitutionalization attempts in Iran and the Cold War	Revolutionary Council Islamist Opposition: Combatant Clergy Association; Islamic Association of Students; Islamic Association of Teachers; Islamic Association of Engineers; Islamic Association of Physicians; Islamic Coalition Societies; Fada'iyan-e Islam; Mojahedin; Liberal Democratic Opposition: Freedom Movement of Iran; National Front; JAMA; Democratic Party of Iranian Kurdistan; Confederation of Iranian Students; Leftist Opposition: Mojahedin-e-Khalq; Fadaiyan-e-Khalq; Tudeh Party; Sarbedaran; Peykar; Movement of Militant Muslims; Razmandegan; Worker's Way; Komalah; Union of Communist Militants	Imperial State of Iran Pro-Shah Groups: Regency Council (Note: Regency Council was practically dissolved on 22 January 1979, when its head resigned to meet Ruhollah Khomeini.); Rastakhiz Party (until 1 November 1978); Imperial Army (Note: Imperial Iranian Army revoked their allegiance to the throne and declared neutrality on 11 February 1979.); Imperial Guard; SAVAK; Shahrbani; Gendarmerie
1978	1987	Chadian–Libyan War; Part of the Cold War and the Arab Cold War	Anti-Libyan Chadian factions: FAT (1978–1979); FAN (1978–1983); FANT (1983–1987); GUNT (1986–1987); France; Inter-African Force: Zaire; Nigeria; Senegal; NFSL Supported by: DR Sudan (1978–1985); Sudan (1985–1987); Egypt (1977–1981); Israel; Iraq; Algeria (pre-reapproachment); United States	Libya: Islamic Legion; Pro-Libyan Chadian factions: FROLINAT; GUNT (1979–1986); Codos (1983–1986); FAP (1978–1986); Pro-Libyan Palestinian and Lebanese groups: PLO (1987); Abu Nidal Organization; Supported by: Algeria; East Germany; Soviet Union
1978	1978	1978 South Lebanon conflict Part of the Palestinian insurgency in South Lebanon, the Lebanese Civil War, and the Israeli–Lebanese conflict	Israel; SLA	PLO
1978	1978	Saur Revolution; Part of the Cold War and the Afghan conflict	People's Democratic Party of Afghanistan	Republic of Afghanistan
1978	1978	Shaba II; Part of the Shaba Invasions and the Cold War	Zaire; France; Belgium; Morocco; United States	FNLC
1978	1979	Uganda–Tanzania War	Tanzania; Uganda National Liberation Front: Kikosi Maalum; Front for National Salvation; Save Uganda Movement; Others; Mozambique; Supported by: Zambia; Angola; Ethiopia; Algeria	Uganda; Libya; Palestine Liberation Organization; Supported by: Pakistan; Saudi Arabia
1978	2025	Kurdistan Workers' Party insurgency Part of the Kurdish–Turkish conflict	Turkey; Ministry of National Defense; General Staff; Special Forces Command; (Turkey) TAF; Turkish Air Force; Turkish Land Forces; Turkish Naval Forces; Ministry of Interior; Turkish National Police; Police Special Operations; Gendarmerie General Command; JİTEM (until early 1990s); JÖH; Village Guards; National Intelligence Organization; Other forces: Counter-Guerrilla (until 1992); Grey Wolves (not militarily involved); Turkish Revenge Brigade (not militarily involved); Some Kurdish tribes (incorporated into Village Guards in 1985)	Kurdistan Communities Union; PKK (until 2025); HPG; YJA-STAR; YDG-H: YPS; YPS-Jin; SDF; YPG; YPG International; YPJ; Anti-Terror Units; PJAK; YRK; HPJ; Sinjar Alliance; Êzîdxan Women's Units; Sinjar Resistance Units; HBDH; DKP; MKP-HKO-PHG; MLKP; THKP-C/MLSPB-DC; TKEP/L; TKP/ML; DK (until 2017) (Note: Merged with the Revolutionary Communard Party (DKP) in 2017.); International Freedom Battalion; Kurdish Hezbollah (1983–1991; 1998–2002) TAK
1978	1989	Cambodian–Vietnamese War Part of the Third Indochina War, the Cold War in Asia, and the Sino-Soviet split	Vietnam (People's Republic of Kampuchea) FUNSK (from 1978) Post-invasion: Until April 1989: Vietnam; People's Republic of Kampuchea; Cuba (reconstruction experts); From April 1989: State of Cambodia	Democratic Kampuchea (1977–1982); Thailand (border clashes) Post-invasion: Coalition Government of Democratic Kampuchea (1982–1990): Khmer Rouge; KPNLF; FUNCINPEC; Thailand (border clashes)
1978	1982	NDF Rebellion; Part of the Cold War and the Arab Cold War	North Yemen; Islamic Front; Supported by: Republic of China; United States	NDF; Supported by: South Yemen; Libya
1979	1979	1979 Khuzestan insurgency Part of the Consolidation of the Iranian Revolution and Arab separatism in Khuzestan	Interim Government; Islamic Republic of Iran (From 6 November)	DRFLA; APCO; PFLA; AFLA; Supported by: Iraq
1979	1979	Sino-Vietnamese War; Part of the Third Indochina War, the Sino-Soviet split and the Cold War in Asia	China	Vietnam
1979	1991	Sino-Vietnamese conflicts (1979–1991); Part of the Third Indochina War, the Sino-Soviet Split and the Cold War in Asia	China	Vietnam
1979	1979	Yemenite War of 1979; Part of the Cold War and the Arab Cold War	North Yemen	South Yemen
1979	1996	1979 Kurdish rebellion in Iran Part of Consolidation of the Iranian Revolution, Iran–Iraq War, and Kurdish separatism in Iran	Interim Government Islamic Republic of Iran (1980−83)	KDP-I; Komala; IPFG; OIPFG (Minority); Sipay Rizgari Supported by: Iraq
1979	1979	1979 Herat uprising Part of the 1979 uprisings in Afghanistan	Afghanistan; Afghan Army; Afghan Air Force	Jamiat-e Islami; Iran
1979	1980	Al-Ansar insurgency	Ba'athist Iraq	Shi'ite rebels
1979	1980	1979–1980 Shia uprising in Iraq	Iraq	Shiite rebels
1979	1979	Grand Mosque seizure	Saudi Arabia; Supported by: France	Ikhwan
1979 (Note: Three dates that are often cited as the start date of the Salvadoran Civil War: 15 October 1979 when the 1979 Salvadoran coup d'état occurred, sometime during 1980, and 10 January 1981 when the final offensive of 1981 began.)	1992	Salvadoran Civil War; Part of the Central American crisis and the Cold War	Salvadoran government (Revolutionary Government Junta until 1982); Paramilitary death squads; Foreign mercenaries (unknown number, possibly hundreds); Supported by: United States	FMLN (CRM, FDR); FPL (BPR); ERP (LP-28); RN (FARN, FAPU); PRTC (MLP); PCES (UDN); Supported by: Soviet Union; Cuba; (Derg) Ethiopia; Nicaragua
1979	1989	Soviet–Afghan War Part of the Cold War and the Afghan conflict	Afghan mujahideen	Soviet Union; Afghanistan

== 1980–1989 ==
Started	Ended	Name of conflict	Belligerents	
Started	Ended	Name of conflict	Victorious party (if applicable)	Defeated party (if applicable)
1980	1980	1980 Gafsa Uprising; Part of the Cold War and the Arab Cold War	Tunisia; Supported by: United States; Sixth Fleet; France; Morocco	Arab Nationalist Rebels; Supported by: Libya; Algeria
1980	2000	Internal conflict in Peru; Part of the Cold War (1980–1991) and the war on drugs (1980–present)	Government of Peru Supported by: Rondas campesinas (Note: These autonomous units have been organised by the Armed Forces since 1982, taking the name of "Self-Defence Committees" (CAD) since 1991. Since its establishment in 2006, most rondas have been organised under the Sole National Central of Peasant Rounds of Peru (CUNARC-P).); ASPRET (since 2023); International support: China; Colombia; Cuba; Japan; North Korea; Russia; Soviet Union; Spain; United States	Shining Path (PCP-SL); CBMR (since 2001); CRH (2004–2012); FARC dissidents; Supported by: FUDEPP (since 2014); Hezbollah (since 2016); ICL (since 2022); Libya (until 2011); ANO (1988); FARC-EP (until 2016); MOVADEF (2009–2024); RIM (1984–2012); MPCP (Note: Until 2018, the Militarized Communist Party of Peru (MPCP) was unofficially referred to as the "Shining Path remnants" (Remanentes de Sendero Luminoso) or as the "Shining Path in the VRAEM" (Sendero Luminoso en el VRAEM). The Peruvian government continues to refer to the MPCP as the direct successor to the Shining Path.) Supported by: China (self-claim); ASPRET (until 2022); Ethnocacerists Supported by: ASPRET (2011–2022); Hezbollah; MPCP (until 2022); FAR-EPT (Note: The Revolutionary Armed Forces – Tupacamarist People's Army (Fuerzas Armadas Revolucionarias – Ejército Popular Tupacamarista) was established in 2015 by Julio César Vásquez Vásquez, a former member of the MRTA.); MRTA (1982–1997); Supported by: Cuba (denied); Libya; Soviet Union; FMLN; M-19; FSLN
1980	1980	Gwangju Uprising; Part of the Minjung movement	(South Korea) South Korean Government: Hanahoe; DSC; ROK Army; National Police	Gwangju citizenry: Protesters; Armed citizens; Citizens' Settlement Committee; Students' Settlement Committee
1980	1980	Nojeh coup plot Part of the Consolidation of the Iranian Revolution	Islamic Republic of Iran: Government of Islamic Republic of Iran; Cabinet of Rajai; Revolutionary Council; Mojahedin of the Islamic Revolution Organization Intelligence aid: Tudeh Party (alleged)	(Iran) Azadegan Organization: Neqab Organisation; Iran Patriotic Officers (NUPA); Supported by: Iraq (alleged)
1980	1980	Coconut War	Vanuatu; Papua New Guinea; Solomon Islands; United Kingdom; France	Nagriamel rebels Support: Phoenix Foundation
1980	1988	Iran–Iraq War; Part of the Cold War, the aftermath of the Iranian revolution, the Iraqi–Kurdish conflict, and the Iran–Saudi Arabia proxy conflict	Iran KDP; PUK; ISCI; Islamic Dawa Party; Hezbollah; Shia volunteers (Note: from: Afghanistan; Iraq; Lebanon; Pakistan; Kuwait; Bahrain; India)	Iraq DRFLA; MEK; NCRI; PDKI; Salvation Force; Arab volunteers (Note: from: Egypt; Jordan; Morocco; North Yemen; Sudan; Tunisia)
1980	1986	Ugandan Bush War; Part of the Cold War	(Uganda) National Resistance Movement (NRM): PRA; UFF; (Uganda) West Nile rebels: Uganda Army (1980); UNRF (I) (1980–85); FUNA (1980–85); Nile Regiment; (Uganda) UFM (1980–83) (Uganda) FEDEMU (1983–85) (Uganda) ULM (Uganda) UNLF-AD Rwenzururu movement (until 1982); Karamojong groups	(Uganda) Ugandan government: UNLF/UPC; FEDEMU (from 1985); FUNA (from 1985); UNRF (I) (from 1985); UFM (from 1985); Tanzania (until 1985); North Korea (1981–1985); Zaire (1986, alleged)
1981	1981	Paquisha War; Part of the Ecuadorian–Peruvian conflicts	Peru	Ecuador
1981	1981	1981 Entumbane uprising Part of the aftermath of the Rhodesian Bush War	Zimbabwe	ZIPRA elements ZANLA elements
1981	1981	1981 Gambian coup d'état attempt Part of the Cold War	The Gambia; Senegal; Supported by: United Kingdom	Gambia Socialist Revolutionary Party
1982	Ongoing	Casamance conflict	Senegal; Guinea-Bissau (1998–1999, 2021); Turkey (2021, alleged by MFDC)	MFDC: Three main factions (Sadio, Badiatte, and Diatta Groups); Various splinter factions; Guinea-Bissau rebels (1998–1999); Supported by: Guinea-Bissau (2000s, alleged); The Gambia (1994–2017)
1982	1982	1982 Amol uprising Part of the consolidation of the Iranian Revolution	Iran	Union of Iranian Communists
1982	1982	Falklands War; Part of the Falkland Islands sovereignty dispute	United Kingdom	Argentina
1982	1982	Ndogboyosoi War	All People's Congress (APC)	Sierra Leone People's Party (SLPP)
1982	1985	1982 Lebanon War Part of the Palestinian insurgency in South Lebanon, the Lebanese Civil War, and the Israeli–Lebanese conflict	Israel; Lebanese Forces; South Lebanon Army	PLO; Syria; Others: Lebanese National Resistance Front; Al-Mourabitoun; PKK
1982	1982	1982 Ethiopian–Somali Border War; Part of the Ethiopian–Somali conflict and the Somali Rebellion	Somalia	Ethiopia; SSDF
1983	1983	Chadian–Nigerian War	Nigeria	Chad
1983	2005	Second Sudanese Civil War; Part of the Sudanese Civil Wars and the South Sudanese wars of independence	SPLA: SPLA-Mainstream; SPLA-Agar; SPDF; ALF; Titweng; SSLM; NDA; Sudanese Alliance Forces; Anyanya II; Eastern Coalition; Derg (until 1987); PDR Ethiopia (1987–1991); FDR Ethiopia (1995–1998); Eritrea (1996–1998, 2002–2005); Uganda (from 1993); Non-combat aid: Libya (1983–1985); Israel; Cuba (until 1991)	Sudan: Armed Forces; PDF; Army of Peace; Muraheleen; (Rwanda) Ex-FAR and Interahamwe; SSDF; SPLA dissidents: SPLA-Nasir; SPLA-United; SSIM/A; Nuer White Army (Uganda) Ugandan insurgents: LRA; WNBF; UNRF (II); Zaire (1994–1997) al-Qaeda (1991–1996); Iraq (Note: Iraqi support for Sudan during the war mostly consisted of weapons shipments; according to the South Sudanese, however, at least one unit of Iraqi paratroopers fought alongside the SAF near Juba. About 200 Iraqi soldiers were allegedly killed, and the site of their remains became known as "Jebel Iraqi". The International Institute for Strategic Studies also stated that Iraqi forces fought alongside Sudanese government troops.); China (Note: Although China was not officially involved in the war, it sent troops to the country in order to protect oil fields and thereby aid the Sudanese military. China also provided Sudan with weaponry.) Combat aid: Libya (1986–1991); DR Congo (1998–2003) Non-combat aid: Iran; Belarus (from 1996)
1983	2009	Sri Lankan Civil War; Part of the Cold War, spillover into the 1987–1989 JVP insurrection	Sri Lanka; India (1987–1990)	Liberation Tigers of Tamil Eelam; Other Tamil militant groups
1983	1987	Eelam War I Part of the Sri Lankan Civil War	Sri Lanka	Liberation Tigers of Tamil Eelam
1983	1986	1983–1986 Kurdish rebellions in Iraq; Part of the Iraqi–Kurdish conflict and the Iran–Iraq War	Iraq	KDP; Supported by: Iran PUK Kurdish mujahideen
1983	1983	United States invasion of Grenada; Part of the Cold War	United States; Grenadian Opposition Caribbean Peace Force: Barbados; Jamaica; Organisation of Eastern Caribbean States; Antigua and Barbuda; Dominica; Saint Kitts and Nevis; Saint Lucia; Saint Vincent and the Grenadines	Grenada (PRG); Cuba; Soviet Union
1984	2003	Siachen conflict Part of the Kashmir conflict	India	Pakistan
1982	2000	South Lebanon conflict (1985–2000); Part of the Israeli–Lebanese conflict, the Iran–Israel proxy conflict, and the Israeli–Palestinian conflict	Hezbollah; Amal; Lebanese Communist Party; Jammoul; PFLP–GC	Israel; South Lebanon Army
1985	1985	Agacher Strip War	Mali	Burkina Faso
1986	1986	South Yemen Civil War; Part of the Arab Cold War	al-Toghmah	al-Zomrah
1986	1986	1986 United States bombing of Libya; Part of the Cold War	United States	Libya
1986	1992	Surinamese Interior War	(Suriname) Surinamese National Army	Jungle Commando; Tucayana Amazonas
1986	1987	Ciskei-Transkei conflict	Ciskei	Transkei; Ciskei dissidents
1986	1987	Sumdorong Chu standoff	India	China
1987	1989	1987–1989 JVP insurrection Part of the Cold War and Sri Lankan Civil War	Sri Lanka; India; Pro-government paramilitaries: Eagles of the Central Hills; Black Cats; ...and at least 8 other minor groups; Anti-JVP leftist militias: Peoples Revolutionary Red Army; Vikalpa Kandayama	Janatha Vimukthi Peramuna: Deshapremi Janatha Viyaparaya; Patriotic People's Armed Troops
1987	1989	War of the Tribes	Tajammu al-Arabi; Sudan; Supported by: Libya	Fur tribes Supported by: Chad
1987	1991	Singing Revolution; Part of the Revolutions of 1989 and the Dissolution of the Soviet Union	Estonia: Popular Front of Estonia; Estonian Citizens' Committee; Congress of Estonia; Heritage Society; MRP-AEG; Estonian National Independence Party; Estonian Social Democratic Independence Party; Communist Party (pro-independence faction); Estonian Social Democratic Party; Latvia: Popular Front of Latvia; Helsinki-86; Latvian National Independence Movement; Citizens' Congress; Environmental Protection Club; Communist Party (pro-independence faction); Latvian Social Democratic Party; Lithuania: Sąjūdis; Lithuanian Liberty League; Communist Party (pro-independence faction); Democratic Labour Party of Lithuania; Lithuanian Riflemen's Union	Soviet Union: Soviet Army; KGB; OMON; Interfront; (Lithuanian Soviet Socialist Republic) Communist Party of Lithuania (pro-Moscow faction); Yedinstvo; (Latvian Soviet Socialist Republic) Communist Party of Latvia (pro-Moscow faction); International Front of the Working People of Latvia; (Estonian Soviet Socialist Republic) Communist Party of Estonia (pro-Moscow faction); Intermovement
1987	1993	First Intifada Part of the Israeli–Palestinian conflict	Israel	Al-Qiyada al-Muwhhada; Fatah; Popular Front for the Liberation of Palestine; Democratic Front for the Liberation of Palestine; Palestinian Communist Party; Hamas; Palestinian Islamic Jihad
1987	Ongoing	Lord's Resistance Army insurgency Part of the Cold war (Until 1991)	Uganda; Zaire (until 1997); DR Congo (from 1997); Central African Republic (from 2008); South Sudan; Arrow Boys; UFDR (United Nations) MONUC; Russia (since April 2024): Wagner Group; Supported by: United States (2011–2017) North Korea(until 1990s)	Lord's Resistance Army; Supported by: Sudan (1994–2002); Allied Democratic Forces
1988	1994	First Nagorno-Karabakh War; Part of the Nagorno-Karabakh conflict, the dissolution of the Soviet Union, and the Wars in the Caucasus	Nagorno-Karabakh (Note: Nagorno-Karabakh Autonomous Oblast (NKAO) until 1991.); Armenia (Note: Armenian Soviet Socialist Republic (Soviet Armenia) until 1990 (renamed Republic of Armenia)/1991 (declared independence).); Armenian Revolutionary Federation; Foreign groups: Kuban Cossacks; Ossetian volunteers; Slavic mercenaries	Azerbaijan (from 1991); Soviet Union (until 1991) (Note: Soviet authorities generally sided with Azerbaijan over Nagorno-Karabakh. Soviet troops were present in Nagorno-Karabakh for 2 1/2 years and supported Azerbaijani militias. Soviet troops directly intervened during Operation Ring in April–May 1991 on the Azerbaijani side.); Azerbaijan SSR; Foreign groups: Hezbe Wahdat; Hezb-e-Islami; Grey Wolves; Chechen volunteers; UNA-UNSO; Slavic mercenaries; Turkish volunteers
1988	1988	1988 Maldives coup d'état attemptPart of the Indian Intervention in the Sri Lankan civil war	India; Maldives	People's Liberation Organisation of Tamil Eelam (Maldives) Maldivian rebels
1988	1998	Bougainville conflict	Bougainville Interim Government (BIG): Bougainville Revolutionary Army (BRA); Supported by: Solomon Islands; Fiji (alleged)	Papua New Guinea: Buka Liberation Front; Bougainville Resistance Force; Supported by: Australia; Indonesia
1989	1989	1989 Paraguayan coup d'état	(Paraguay) 1st Army Corps	Government of Paraguay
1989	1992	Afghan Civil War (1989–1992); Part of the Cold War, Revolutions of 1989, Dissolution of the Soviet Union, and Afghan conflict	Afghan Interim Government; Jamiat-e Islami; Hezb-e Islami Gulbuddin (until July 1989); National Islamic Front of Afghanistan; Ittehad-e Islami; Hezb-i Islami Khalis; Harakat-i Inqilab-i Islami; Independent Factions: Khalq (1990); Hezb-e Islami Gulbuddin (from July 1989) (Afghanistan) Junbish-i Milli (from 1992); Foreign Mujahideen: Al Qaeda; Maktab al-Khidamat; Various factions also fought among each other Supported by: Pakistan United States Saudi Arabia United Kingdom China Germany Iran	Republic of Afghanistan; Supported by: Soviet Union (until 1991); India; Commonwealth of Independent States (from 1991); Tajikistan; Turkmenistan; Uzbekistan; Russia (until January 1992)
1989	1991	Mauritania–Senegal Border War	Mauritania; Supported by: Syria; Iraq	Senegal; FLAM
1989	1996	KDPI insurgency (1989–1996) Part of the Kurdish separatism in Iran	Iran	KDP-I
1989	Ongoing	Insurgency in Jammu and Kashmir; Part of the Kashmir conflict	India; Indian Armed Forces; Indian Army; Central Armed Police Force; Jammu and Kashmir Police	Political Parties: APHC; JIJK; Armed groups: Lashkar-e-Taiba; TRF; JeM; MJC; HuJI; Hizbul Mujahideen; PAFF; Other separatist movements & insurgent militant groups; Former armed groups: JKLF (active until 1992); HUM (active until 2001); Al-Umar-Mujahideen (active until 2006); DeM (active until 2018); Al-Badr (active until 2022); Al-Qaeda; AQIS; AGH (active until 2022); Supported by: Pakistan; D-Company; Islamic State; (Islamic State) IS Hind; ISJK (until 2019)
1989	1989	1989 Philippine coup d'état attempt	Philippines United States (minor air support)	Reform the Armed Forces Movement
1989	1989	Romanian Revolution; Part of the Revolutions of 1989	Revolutionaries: Anti-communists; Communist Party dissidents; After 22 December 1989: National Salvation Front; Romanian Armed Forces	Government (until 22 December 1989); Securitate; Miliția; Army of the Socialist Republic of Romania; Communist Party loyalists
1989	1990	United States invasion of Panama the war on drugs and Cold War	United States	Panama
1989	1997	First Liberian Civil War the Liberian Civil Wars and spillover of the Sierra Leone Civil War	Anti-Doe Armed Forces elements (Liberia) NPFL (Liberia) INPFL (1989–1992) (Liberia) NPFL-CRC (1994–1996); Supported by: Libya; Burkina Faso; RUF	(Liberia) Liberian government: (Liberia) Loyalist Armed Forces elements; (Liberia) ULIMO (1991–1994): (Liberia) ULIMO-K (1994–1996); (Liberia) ULIMO-J (1994–1996); (Liberia) LPC (1993–1996) (Liberia) LUDF (later becoming ULIMO) (Liberia) LDF (1993–1996); Supported by: ECOMOG: Nigeria (from 1990); Ghana (from 1990); Guinea (from 1990); The Gambia (from 1990); Sierra Leone (1990–1991); (United Nations) UNOMIL (September 22, 1993 – September 12, 1997)

== See also ==
- List of wars: 1990–2002
- List of wars: 2003–2019
