= Plurinational Association of Tawantinsuyo Reservists =

Rebel military group in Peru

- Asociación Plurinacional de Reservistas del Tawantinsuyo
- Leader: Eddy Villarroel Medina (Sacha)
- Dates active: 2011–present
- Country: Peru
- Active regions: VRAEM; Pichanaqui; Oxapampa; Lima
- Ideology: Ethnocacerism; Indigenismo; Anti-communism
- Political position: Syncretic
- Status: Active
- Part of: FUDARP (2018–2021)
- Wars: Internal conflict in Peru

The Plurinational Association of Tawantinsuyo Reservists (Spanish: Asociación Plurinacional de Reservistas del Tawantinsuyo; ASPRET) is an ethnonationalist paramilitary group, active in the VRAEM conflict zone in Peru. The group is led by Eddy Villarroel Medina, also known as "Comandante Sacha," a former member of the Peruvian Armed Forces. ASPRET's primary objective is to gain political power, and overthrow the Peruvian state. Members of the group call themselves the "guardians of the people" and have participated in riots in Oxapampa and Puerto Bermudez. ASPRET had an alliance with the Militarized Communist Party of Peru from 2018 to 2021. The group has also been accused of being connected to Hezbollah, which it denies. Many members of the movement are armed forces veterans of Peru's internal wars or the border disputes with Ecuador in the 1980s and 1990s.

== History ==
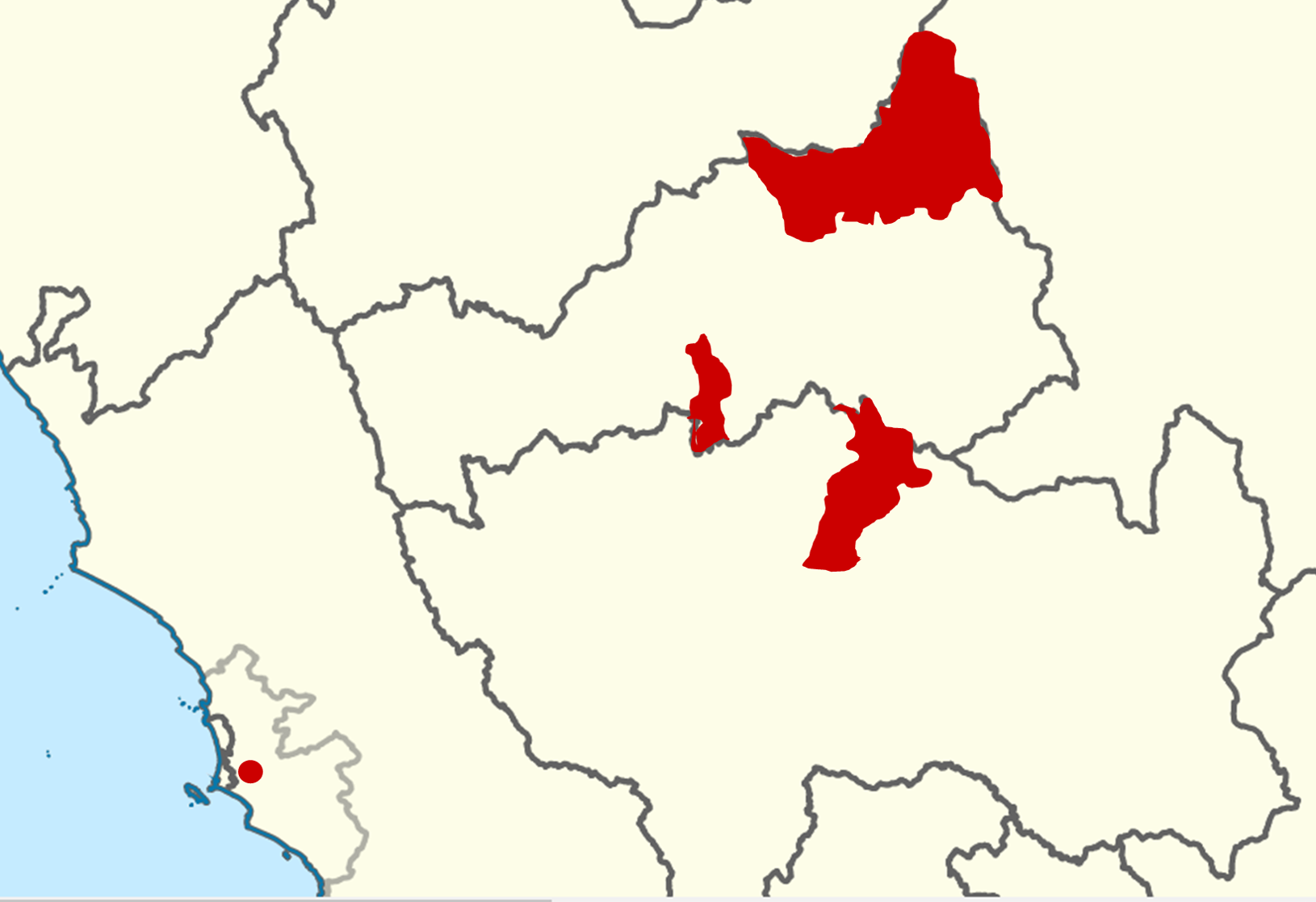
ASPRET areas of operation

Eddy Villaroel Medina was a former reservist in the Peruvian Army, who fought in the Internal conflict in Peru. Retiring from the Army in 1992, Media joined the Self-defense committees. He retired again in 2005, and founded ASPRET in 2011.

In 2014 members of ASPRET took over the Oxapampa square, demanding investigations into alleged acts of corruption in Ciudad Constitución and the Puerto Bermúdez District.

A year later in 2015 they participated in the Pichanaki Clashes against the oil and natural gas company PlusPetrol

On April 22, 2017, ASPRET released a video of Medina meeting with Comrade José, leader of the MCPP, where they discussed the creation of a United front. This resulted in the creation of the United Democratic Andean Revolutionary Front of Peru (Spanish: Frente Unido Democrático Andino Revolucionario del Perú).

Medina has also accused Vladimir Cerrón of having connections to Shining Path.

== Relationships ==
=== Ethnocacerist Movement ===
Medina has been accused of being involved with the Ethnocacerist Movement, but this has been denied by Medina, and those close to Antauro Humala, leader of the movement.

=== Hezbollah ===
ASPRET has been accused of maintaining relations with Hezbollah through Edwar Quiroga Vargas, a Peruvian Shiite leader. Vargas has been accused of having connections with the Lebanese group due to social media posts, and also of his connections with other Shia leaders in Peru

== See also ==
- Internal conflict in Peru
- Shining Path
- Ethnocacerism
- Antauro Humala
