= United Democratic Andean Revolutionary Front of Peru =

Rebel military group in Peru

- Frente Unido Democrático Andino Revolucionario del Perú
- Leaders: Víctor Quispe Palomino; Eddy Villarroel Medina
- Dates active: 2017–2022
- Country: Peru
- Active regions: VRAEM; Pichanaqui; Oxapampa; Lima
- Ideology: Ethnocacerism; Communism
- Political position: Syncretic
- Wars: Internal conflict in Peru

The United Democratic Andean Revolutionary Front of Peru (Spanish: Frente Unido Democrático Andino Revolucionario del Perú) (FUDARP) was an alliance between the historically opposed Militarized Communist Party of Peru (MPCP) and the Plurinational Association of Tawantinsuyo Reservists (ASPRET) formed in 2017, with the objective of reconciling the two armed groups. The alliance would eventually collapse in 2022.

== History ==
The United Front was established in 2017 following agreements reached by the leaders of both factions, Víctor "Comrade José" Quispe Palomino (MPCP) and Eddy "Commander Sacha" Villarroel Medina (ASPRET). On 22 April 2017, ASPRET released a video of Medina and Palimino discussing the creation of a united front. After the agreement, Medina became a spokesperson for the MPCP.

== See also ==
- Shining Path
- Ethnocacerism
- Antauro Humala
