= 1949 Hazara Rebellion =

Date	1949
Location	Kingdom of Afghanistan
Status	Rebellion suppressed

Belligerents
Kingdom of Afghanistan	Hazara rebels

Commanders and leaders
(Kingdom of Afghanistan) Mohammed Zahir Shah	Qurban Zawar (executed)

The 1949 Hazara Rebellion was a rebellion by Hazara rebels in the region of Shahristan in the Kingdom of Afghanistan, which took place in 1949. It was suppressed by a military battalion led by the governor of Kabul, after which the leader of the rebellion, Qurban Zawar, was arrested. He was ordered to be executed under the direct commands of Mohammed Zahir Shah.
