= Abyei Liberation Front =

Sudanese guerrilla organization (early 1980s-1984)

The Abyei Liberation Front was a guerrilla organization in Sudan, active in the Abyei region in the early 1980s and 2000s. It was first formed as an self protection force for the Ngok Dinka tribe in response to attacks on their community by Misseriya Arab but later incorporated to the Sudanese Peoples Liberation Army (SPLA). The group later emerged in 2008 as an Misseriya Arab militia led by Muhammad Omar al Ansari but was disbanded in 2010.

== History ==
=== Abyei Liberation Front 1980s – 1984 ===
The ALF was one of the armed groups active during this period that were linked to the Anyanya II movement of Southern army mutineers. The commanders of ALF were Deng Alor Kuol and Chol Deng Alaak. Around 1984 the ALF was contacted by SPLA detachments from Ethiopia and incorporated into the SPLA.

=== Abyei Liberation Front 2008-2010 ===
ALF reemerged as Misseriya militia funded by the Sudanese Armed Forces (SAF) in February 2008, after the election of Edward Lino for the SPLM Chairman of Abyei. ALF was led by National Congress Party member Mohammed Omar al Ansari who accused Lino of mobilizing SPLA forces to mistreat Arabs in Abyei. According to Al-Ansari ALF consisted of 1500-3000 armed Misseriya fighters around the Abyei region. ALF went defunct in 2010 and fighters joined Justice and Equality Movement or the SAF.
