= Pichanaqui District =

Coordinates: 10.9247°S 74.8768°W

Pichanaqui
- District
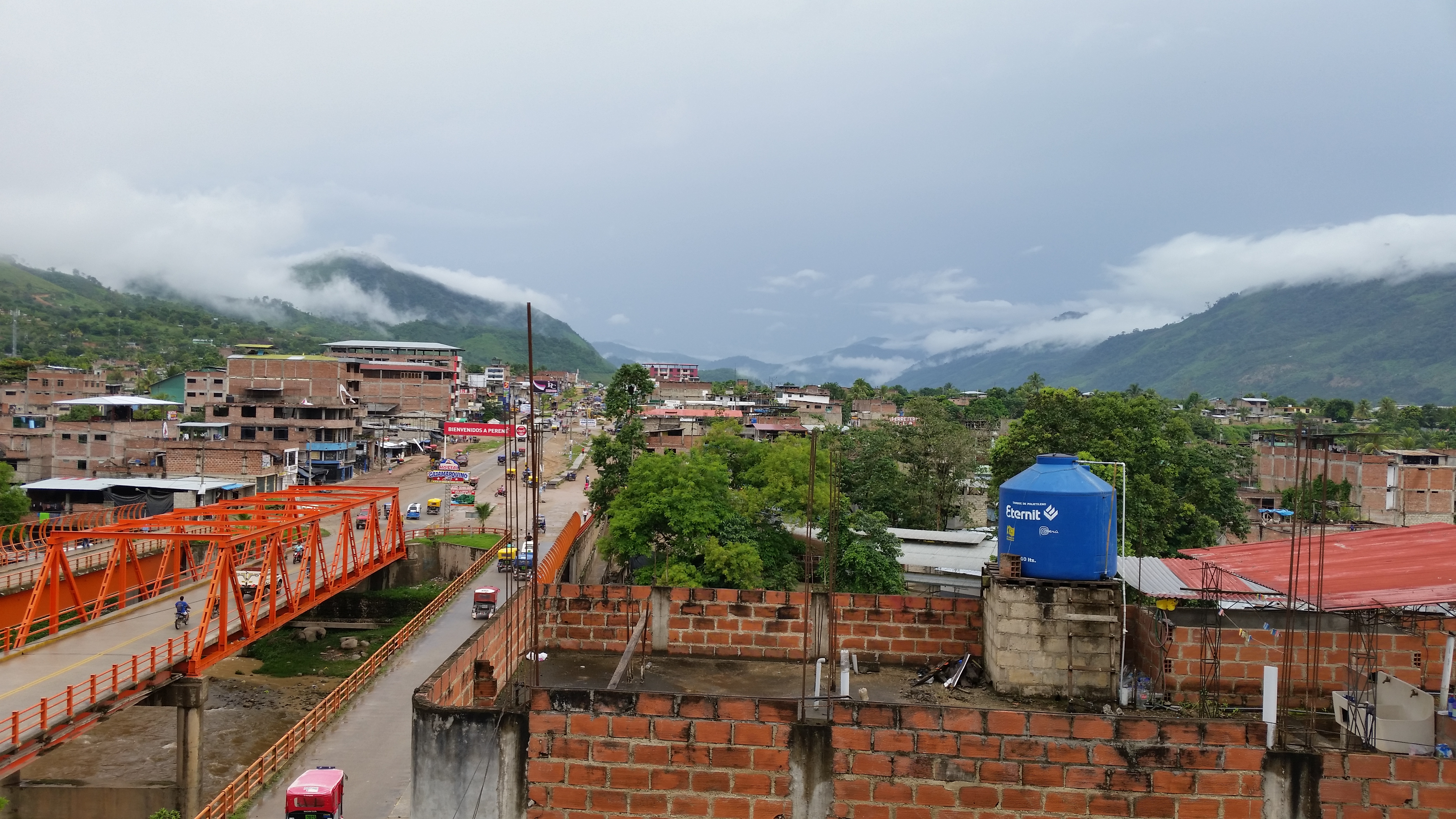
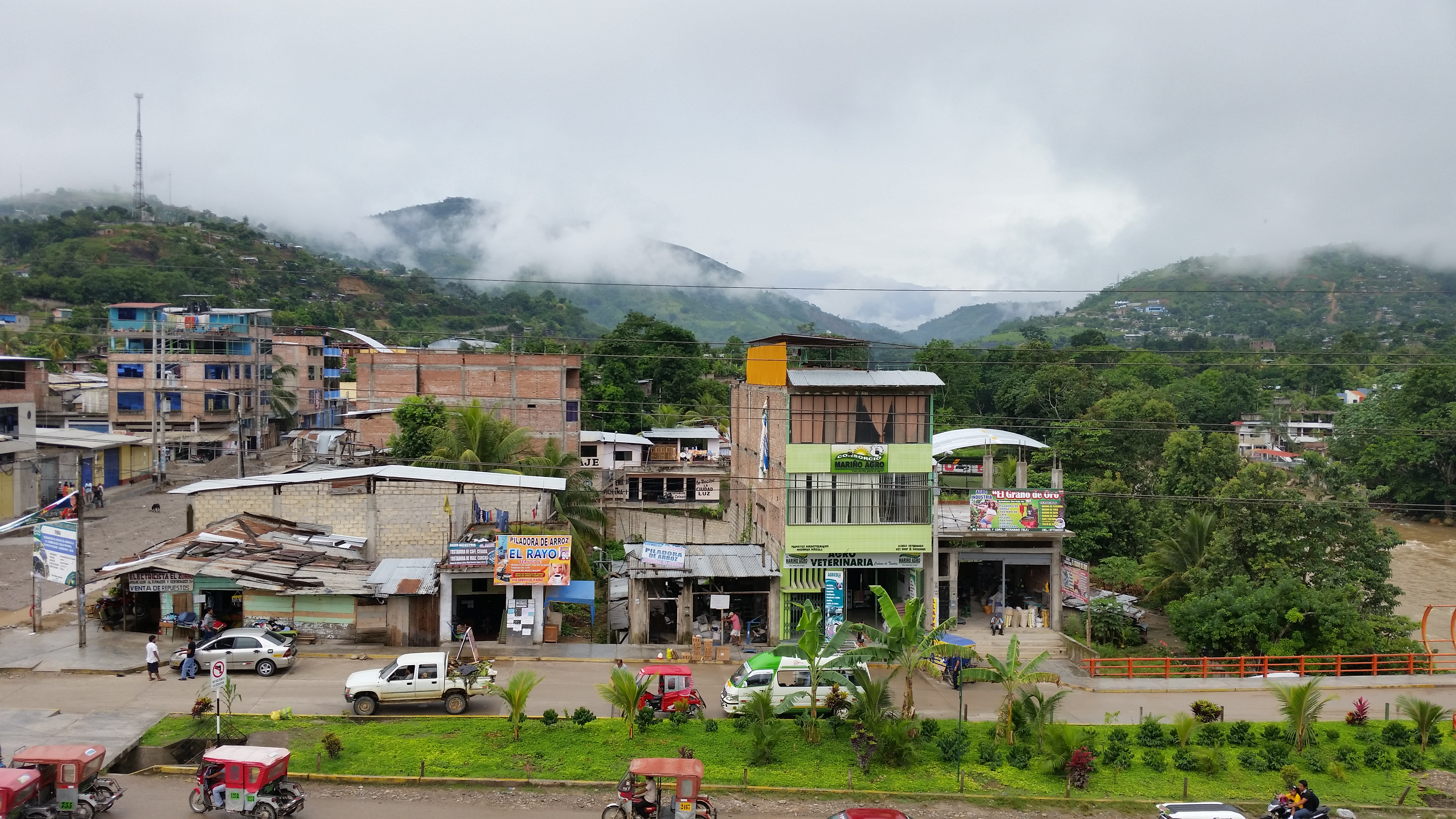
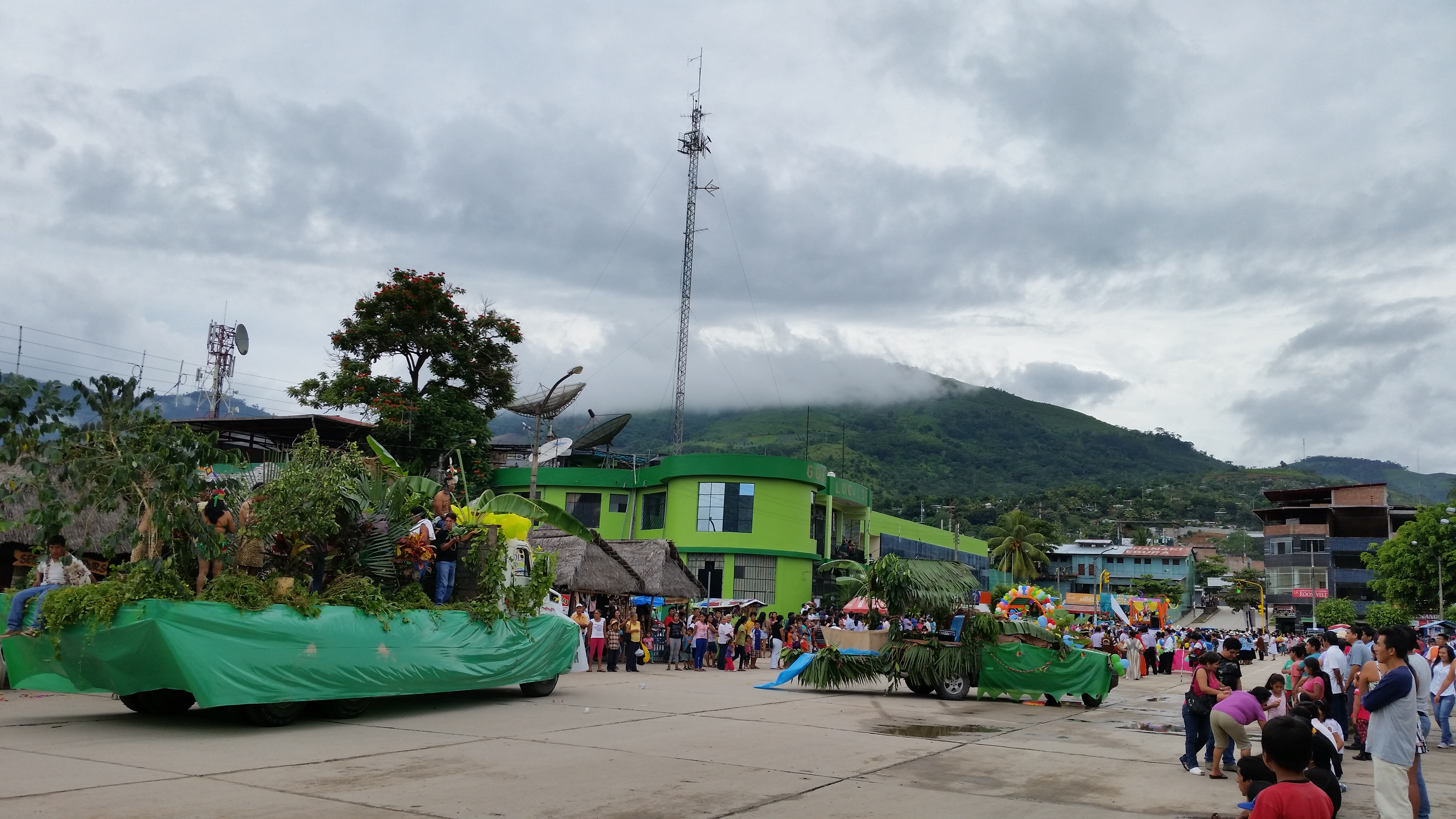
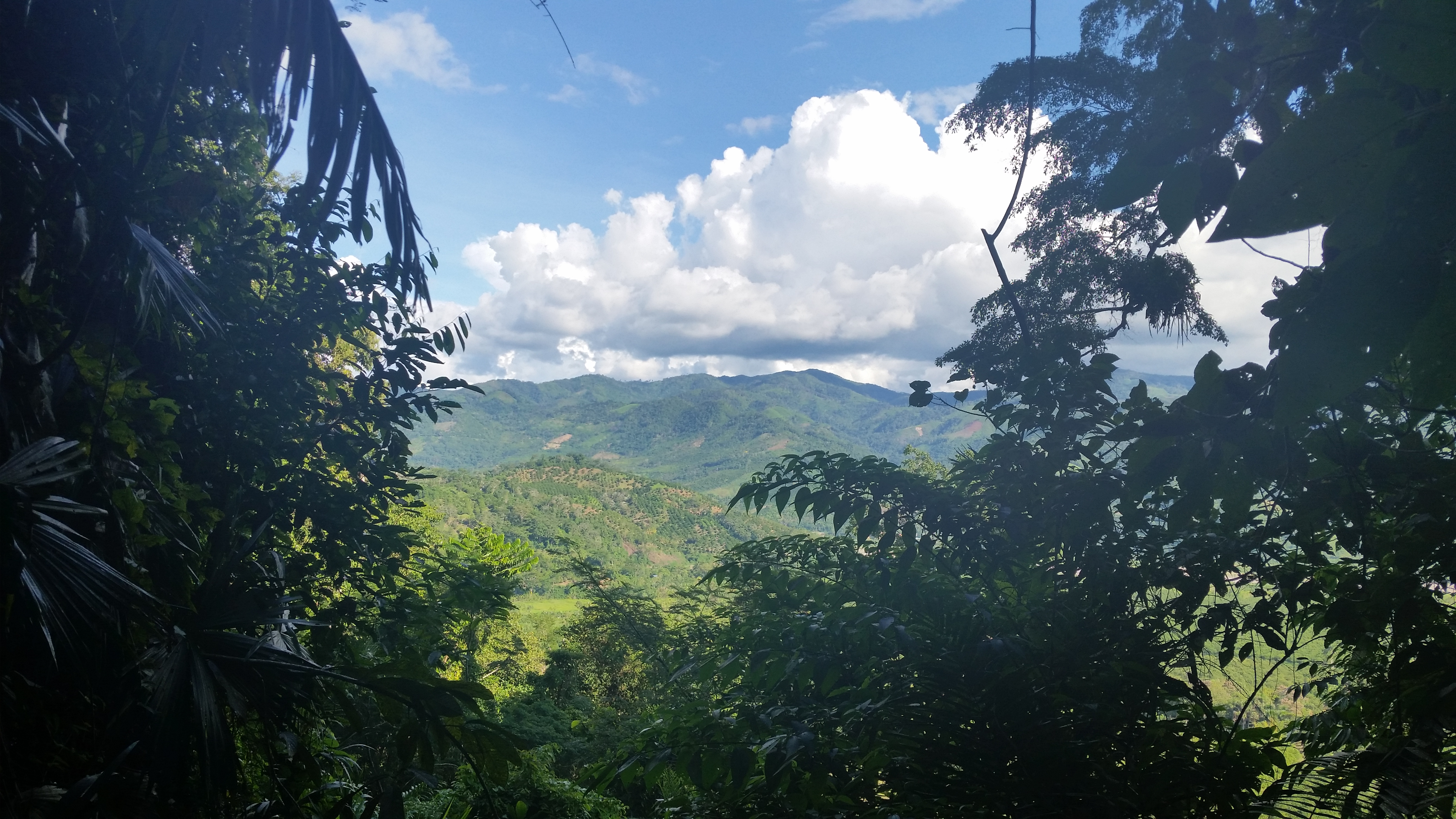

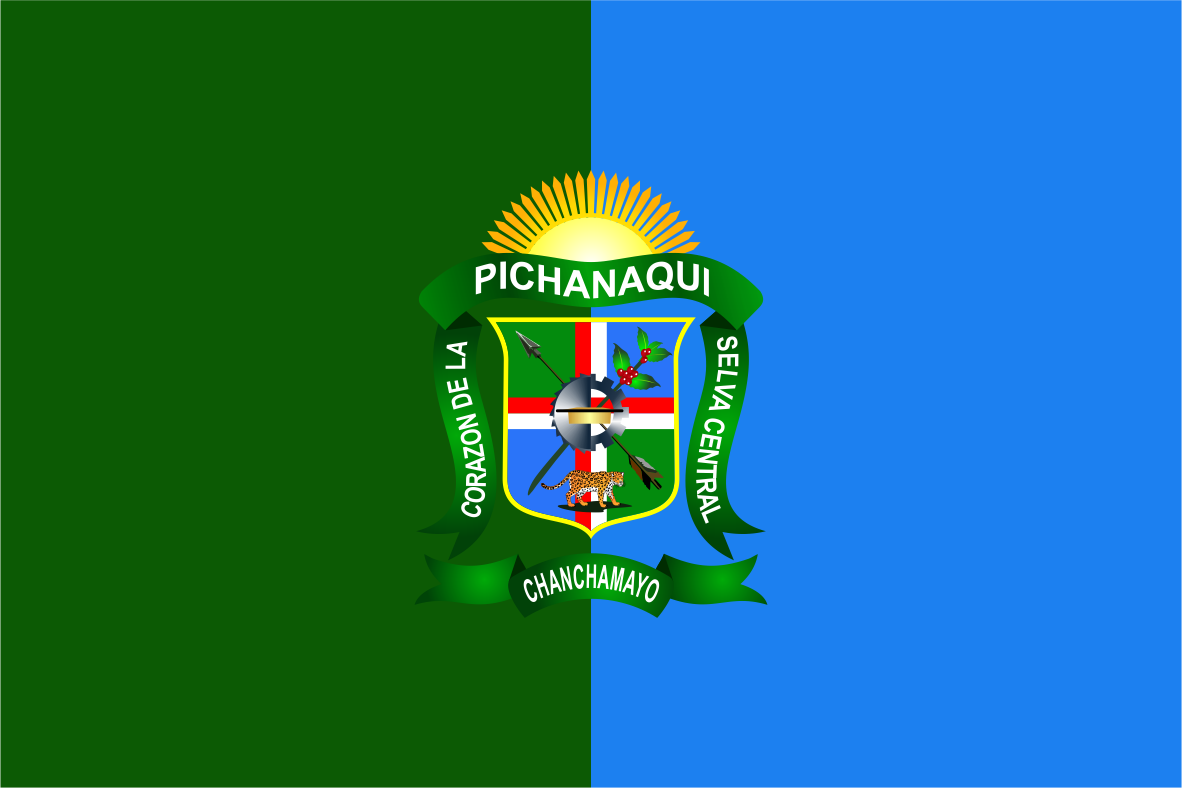
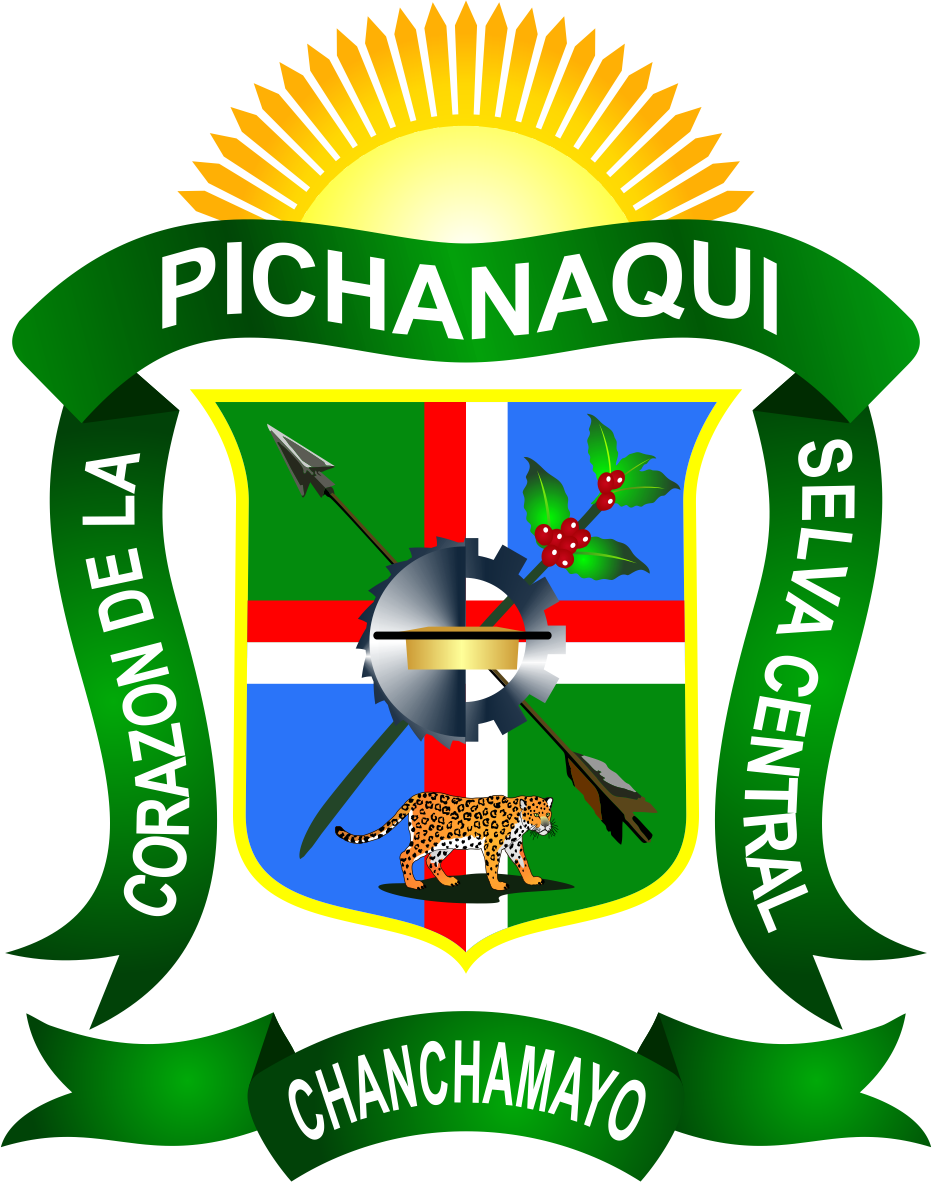
- Flag Coat of arms

- Location of Pichanaqui in the Chanchamayo province
- Country: Peru
- Region: Junín
- Province: Chanchamayo
- Founded: September 24, 1977
- Capital: Bajo Pichanaqui

Government
  - Mayor: Raul Aliaga Sotomayor

Area
  - Total: 1,496.59 km^{2} (577.84 sq mi)
- Elevation: 525 m (1,722 ft)

Population (2017 census)
  - Total: 39,054
  - Density: 26.095/km^{2} (67.587/sq mi)
- Time zone: UTC-5 (PET)
- UBIGEO: 120303
- Website: munipichanaqui.gob.pe

Pichanaqui District is one of six districts of the province Chanchamayo in Peru.

== Climate ==
Climate data for Pichanaki, Pichanaqui, elevation 497 m (1,631 ft), (1991–2020)
Month	Jan	Feb	Mar	Apr	May	Jun	Jul	Aug	Sep	Oct	Nov	Dec	Year
Mean daily maximum °C (°F)	31.1 (88.0)	30.5 (86.9)	31.1 (88.0)	31.5 (88.7)	31.4 (88.5)	31.4 (88.5)	31.7 (89.1)	32.6 (90.7)	33.1 (91.6)	32.8 (91.0)	32.1 (89.8)	31.0 (87.8)	31.7 (89.1)
Mean daily minimum °C (°F)	21.0 (69.8)	21.0 (69.8)	21.0 (69.8)	20.9 (69.6)	20.2 (68.4)	19.3 (66.7)	18.7 (65.7)	19.0 (66.2)	19.5 (67.1)	20.6 (69.1)	21.1 (70.0)	21.1 (70.0)	20.3 (68.5)
Average precipitation mm (inches)	253.2 (9.97)	241.9 (9.52)	191.0 (7.52)	90.5 (3.56)	62.6 (2.46)	28.1 (1.11)	36.5 (1.44)	40.8 (1.61)	61.7 (2.43)	105.2 (4.14)	127.4 (5.02)	280.7 (11.05)	1,519.6 (59.83)
Source: National Meteorology and Hydrology Service of Peru
