= Children of Memory =

2012 documentary film by Maria Teresa Rodriguez

Children of Memory (Niños de la Memoria) is a documentary film produced by Kathryn Smith Pyle and Maria Teresa Rodriguez and directed by Rodriguez. From 1980 to 1992 about 75,000 women, men and children died and disappeared during El Salvador’s civil war. It was known fact that most adults would be assassinated, but no one knows exactly what happened to the children. The film follows Pro-Búsqueda investigator Margarita Zamora as she searches the countryside asking eyewitnesses to recall what they remember from war times. As Pyle and Rodriguez tell the personal account of Zamora's search for her four siblings, so do they also tell the story of American Jaime Harvey, who was adopted from El Salvador in 1980, and Salvador Garcia, a farmer who continues the search for his daughter Cristabel. Their efforts to find their family members are challenged by the lack of access to Salvadoran military war archives.

== Production ==
Children of Memory – Niños de la Memoria was produced in association with Independent Television Service (ITVS), Latino Public Broadcasting and Sundance Documentary Film Program.

The documentary premiered in May 2012 in El Salvador at Festival Ambulante. The broadcast premiere was on June 30, 2013 as part of the Global Voices Series on the World Channel.

The film is being distributed in North America by Women Make Movies.

== Film festivals and awards ==
The film has received an Award of Merit from the Latin American Studies Association and a Cine Golden Eagle Award.

Has shown at universities and noted festivals such as, the DOXA Documentary Film Festival, Punta del Este International Film Festival, Latin American Studies Association Film Festival, and the San Francisco Latino Film Festival among many others.
