= Jon de Cortina =

Spanish-Salvadoran Jesuit

Jon Cortina Garaigorta, S.J. (Bilbao, December 8, 1934 – Guatemala City, December 12, 2005) was a Jesuit priest, engineer, and activist, founder of Pro-Búsqueda, an organization dedicated to searching for the missing children of the Salvadoran Civil War. He was a professor at Central American University (UCA), the Jesuit university of El Salvador, and escaped the massacre of the Jesuit community at the university in November 1989.

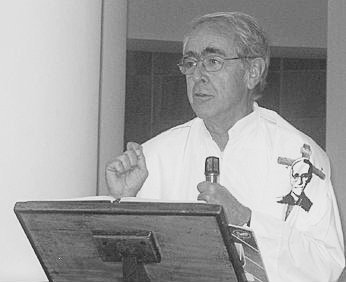
Jon Cortina.

== Life ==
Cortina was born in Bilbao, Spain, in 1934, but his family fled to France as refugees from the Spanish Civil War, later returning. He entered the Society of Jesus in 1954, at the age of 19. The following year, while still a novice, he was sent to serve in El Salvador. After a year in the mission there, he went to the United States to do his university studies, following by seminary studies in Germany. He was ordained a priest in 1968. He then returned to Spain, where he earned a Doctorate in Engineering from the Polytechnical University of Madrid in 1973.

After completing his studies, Cortina was again sent to El Salvador, where he taught strength of materials and other civil engineering courses at the Jesuit university in San Salvador. In addition to his academic duties, he served as a priest for the small peasant villages surrounding the capital. During a period of military dictatorship supporting the Salvadoran elite, he and his fellow Jesuits taught peasant communities to stand up for their rights. The government's response was a "scorched earth" campaign against the peasant population, deemed either to be terrorists or their supporters, with widespread massacres of civilians, even children.

The military also targeted the clergy who spoke up for human rights. When a fellow Jesuit, Rutilio Grande was murdered by government forces in 1977 while returning to his parish church in Aguilares, Archbishop Óscar Romero (who was himself assassinated in 1980) appointed Cortina to succeed him as the pastor of the village. In this role, Cortina continued to be an outspoken critic of the government's repression of the rural population.

Cortina continued to serve on the faculty of the university, where he kept his primary residence. On the night of 16 November 1989, however, he was at his rural parish. While driving back to the capital the next day, he heard on his car radio the news that all occupants of the Jesuit resident at the university had been executed overnight by a large contingent of government soldiers. This included six Jesuit priests who taught at the university as well as their housekeeper and her 16-year-old daughter. He heard his own name listed among the dead. International outrage over this massacre eventually pressured the government to work out a ceasefire with the guerrilla rebels they had been fighting.

After the civil war came to an end in 1992, Cortina began to hear reports from refugees that many children were unaccounted for, their bodies not being among those slain in the massacres. He also heard rumors from soldiers that some of the children from these villages had been taken and later "sold" to childless couples from the United States and Europe who were looking to adopt. He then set up the organization Pro-Búsqueda (For the Search) to try to locate these children. The group's policy was not to retrieve the children, but simply to locate them in order to provide their birth parents the comfort of knowing that their children were still alive. Initially simply using standard investigative techniques, the organization was eventually able to use DNA to trace the children. 1

Cortina died in 2005, of a massive stroke, while at a conference in Guatemala City. In 2007, he was posthumously awarded the Jaime Brunet international human rights award.

== Legacy ==
The Cortina Community is an intentional sophomore living-learning community named after Jon Cortina in the United States. Located on the campus of Creighton University, in Omaha, Nebraska, the Cortina Community is grounded in the foundational pillars of community, service, faith, and justice.

== See also ==
- Mothers of the Plaza de Mayo
- Grandmothers of the Plaza de Mayo
