= Marianella García Villas =

- Born: 7 August 1948; San Salvador, El Salvador
- Died: 13 March 1983 (aged 34); Suchitoto, El Salvador
- Occupation: human rights attorney/activist
- Years active: 1969–1983

Marianella García Villas (7 August 1948 – 13 March 1983) was a Salvadoran attorney, who served in the Legislative Assembly of El Salvador from 1974 to 1976 before resigning her post to found the first independent human rights commission in the country. After the 1979 coup d'état led to the installation of a military junta, she began documenting human rights abuses in the country, helping families report disappearances and imprisonments. Under personal threat and with escalating violations of rights, García took her documentation to the United Nations Commission on Human Rights, gaining international notice of the situation inside the country. She was assassinated by the Salvadoran Armed Forces in 1983 and was posthumously awarded the Bruno Kreisky Prize for Services to Human Rights.

== Early life ==
Marianella García Villas was born on 7 August 1948 (Note: Most sources show her birth as occurring on 7 August 1948. The article in the Italian journal Se Vuoi shows the date as 7 May 1944.) in San Salvador, El Salvador to a well-to-do family. She was sent to Barcelona to complete her primary and secondary education and then returned to El Salvador and enrolled in the University of El Salvador to study law. While in university, she became involved in the university's Catholic youth organization. She completed her studies, graduating with a degree in law in 1969.

== Career ==
In 1974, García was elected as a deputy to Parliament as a representative of the Christian Democratic Party (CDP), the only woman to serve in the Legislative Assembly from 1974 to 1976. In 1978, she founded the first human rights commission in the country, (Spanish: Comisión de Derechos Humanos de El Salvador (CDHES)), to document the increasing violations of rights and numbers of political prisoners being detained and disappeared. The organization was independent from government control and García, as president shared the leadership of the organization with Roberto Cuéllar, who operated a legal aid association. She became a contact point for families searching for information about their relatives. Because she kept detailed records of prisoners, union workers and members of the Populist Church who were under government surveillance and visited the prisons to gain information, she was able to assist families who needed information.

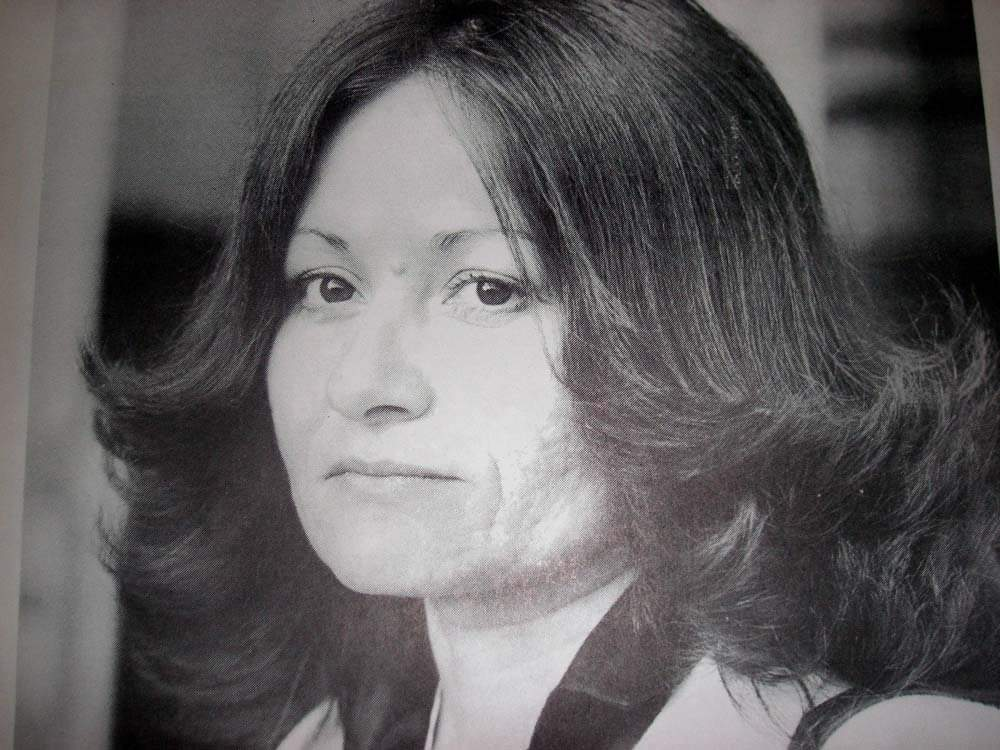
Marianella García Villas (San Salvador, August 7, 1948 - March 14, 1983) was a Salvadoran philosopher and lawyer, president of the Independent Commission on Human Rights of El Salvador

Despite the accusations of "political motivation", García and her colleagues took photographs of victims. The documentation provided both a visual record of the atrocities, but also an archive for families looking for relatives. She also shared information about the violations in weekly reports to the Archbishop Óscar Romero, who denounced the perpetrators and the terror being waged in weekly sermons and on the Jesuit-run radio program. In 1980, due to ideological differences when the CDP which supported the military junta that had led to the Salvadoran Civil War, she resigned from the party. Almost from the beginning of the CDHES, García began receiving threats. Her car was riddled with machine gun fire in April 1979 and on 13 March 1980 her offices were bombed. Ten days later, Archbishop Romero was assassinated during a mass. That same fall, García went to Geneva and met with Theo van Boven, head of the United Nations' Division for Human Rights to show him the archive of photographic evidence.

Under continuing threats, García moved the offices of the CDHES to Mexico City and continued her international appeal for assistance to end the human rights violations in her country. Between October 1979 and December 1982, García’s records documented 3,200 forced disappearances, 43,337 murders, and over 700 imprisonments of political dissidents. She returned to El Salvador in February 1983 to photograph abuses and try to collect evidence of the use of chemical weapons by the Salvadoran Armed Forces for the United Nations Commission on Human Rights. She was captured on 13 March at the Hacienda La Bermuda, in Suchitoto, and taken to the nearby Military School where she was tortured. The military reports indicated that they had captured a guerrilla fighter.

== Death and legacy ==
García was executed on 13 or 14 March 1983 and was posthumously awarded the Bruno Kreisky Prize for Services to Human Rights in 1984. She is remembered world wide for her commitment to human rights. In 2013, a seminar, "Thirty years after Marianella Garcia Villas – What now, El Salvador?", was hosted in Oslo by the Fritt Ord Foundation, to discuss the strides made in El Salvador since García had brought the situation to the attention of the international community. In 2014, a biography Avvocata dei poveri, difensore degli oppressi, voce dei perseguitati e degli scomparsi (Editrice Ave, Italian) by Anselmo Palini was published about García's life and legacy. In 2015, her burial place was uncovered in the main cemetery of San Salvador.

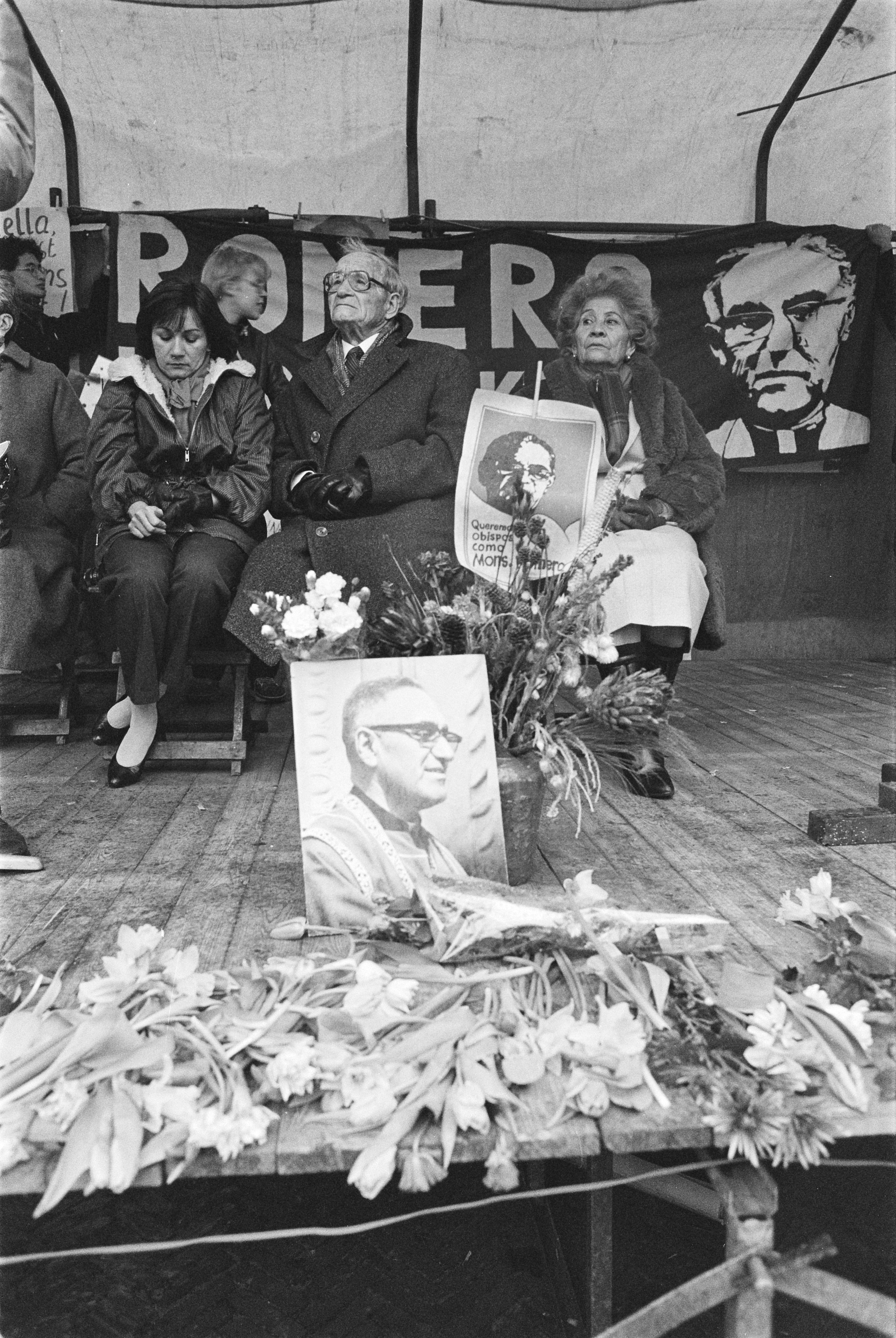
Commemoration of the assassination of Archbishop Romero (El Salvador) in The Hague; parents and sister of Marianella García Villas in the portrait of Romero Date: March 24, 1984
