= Pro-Búsqueda =

Salvadoran NGO

- Formation: 1994; 30 years ago
- Type: Non-profit NGO
- Purpose: Human rights, Enforced disappearance, Child abduction
- Headquarters: San Salvador
- Location: El Salvador
- Region served: Northern Triangle of Central America

Pro-Búsqueda is a nongovernmental organization from El Salvador dedicated to the search of children who were disappeared during the Salvadoran Civil War. Its full name (in Spanish) is “Asociación Pro-Búsqueda de Niñas y Niños Desaparecidos”, which translates as the Association for the Search of Disappeared Children. Since its start, in 1994, Pro-Búsqueda has documented hundreds of cases of children who were disappeared in the context of the Salvadoran civil war, most of them through the forced disappearance by the Salvadoran armed forces. Through persistent research, Pro-Búsqueda has registered close to a thousand documented cases of disappeared children in El Salvador and the organization has been able to reunite hundreds of children with their biological families. Hundreds more remain unaccounted for.

== History ==
Pro-Búsqueda was founded in San Salvador in 1994, by Jesuit priest Jon Cortina and human rights researchers Ralph Sprenkels, Mirna Perla and Dorothee Molders. Pro-Búsqueda efforts soon led to the first incidents of children kidnapped during the war being reunited with their biological families. Physicians for Human Rights provided technical support the perform DNA testing for the families and children involved. In subsequent years, dozens of disappeared children were traced and identified by Pro-Búsqueda. Many of these children turned out to have been adopted, through flawed adoption mechanisms, to other countries. Pro-Búsqueda's research was able to locate disappeared children in the United States of America, France, Spain, Italy, and the Netherlands, among other countries.

On 1 March 2005, the Inter-American Court of Human Rights presented a historical resolution on one of Pro-Búsqueda's cases: the 1982 forced disappearance of the sisters Ernestina and Erlinda Serrano Cruz in the context of a large-scale military operation known as "Guinda de Mayo." In 2010 the Salvadoran government created a National Search Commission for Disappeared Children, operating with the country's State Department. Despite many years of lobbying the Salvadoran government and the armed forces for disclosure all relevant archives holding information concerning disappeared children, such access has not been granted.
