= List of wars involving Colombia =

This is a list of wars involving the Republic of Colombia and its predecessor states from Pre-Hispanic times to the present day.

Picture	Conflict	Combatant 1	Combatant 2	Results
	Battle of Pasca (~1470)	Zipazgo of the southern Muisca	Sutagao & Panche	Zipazgo victory: Sutagao submitted to Muisca rule
	Battle of Chocontá (~1490)	Zacazgo of the northern Muisca	Zipazgo of the southern Muisca	Zipazgo of the southern victory
	Spanish conquest of the Muisca (1537-1540)	Guecha warriors of the Muisca	(Spain) Conquistadors of the Spanish Empire	Spanish victory: Muisca Confederation incorporated into the Spanish Empireis created
	War of Jenkins' Ear (1739-1748)	Spain	Great Britain	Status quo ante bellum: Treaty of Aix-la-Chapelle
	Seven Years' War (1762-1763)	France; Holy Roman Empire (Note: While Prussia itself was part of the Empire and many HRE states remained neutral, the Imperial Diet formally declared action against Prussia, so it was an Imperial action rather than being conducted solely in the name of Austrian interests. See below.); Russia (Note: Until 1762); Spain (Note: From 1762); (yes) Sweden; Bengal; and others...	Great Britain; Prussia; (Kingdom of Portugal) Portugal; Russia (Note: From Feb until June 1762); and others...	Anglo-Prussian coalition victory: Treaty of Paris (1763); France cedes its North American possessions east of the Mississippi River, along with the colonies of Canada, St Vincent, Tobago, Dominica, Grenada, and Northern Circars to Britain; France cedes Louisiana and its North American territory west of the Mississippi River to Spain; Spain cedes Florida to Britain, in exchange for the return of Havana and Manila
	Colombian War of Independence (1810–1825)	Republic of Colombia (from 1819); New Granadine Patriots (1816–1819); United Provinces of New Granada (1811–1816); Free and Independent State of Cundinamarca (1811–1815); Supreme Governing Junta of Santa Fe in New Granada (1810); First Republic of Venezuela (1811–1812); Second Republic of Venezuela (1813–1814); Third Republic of Venezuela (1817–1819); Supported by: United Kingdom; Haiti	Bourbon Kingdom of Spain (from 1813); and its territories: Viceroyalty of New Granada; Captaincy General of Venezuela; Captaincy General of Puerto Rico; Viceroyalty of Peru; Napoleonic Kingdom of Spain (1808–1813)	Colombian and Allied victory: Creation of the Republic of Colombia; Creation of the republics of Peru and Bolivia; End of the Spanish political presence in South America; Spain cedes New Granada to the Republic of Colombia
	Venezuelan War of Independence (1811–1823)	Patriots 1811–1816: Venezuela; Colombia 1816–1819: Venezuela; Haiti 1819–1823: Gran Colombia	(Spanish Empire) Royalists Spain: (Spain) Supreme Junta; (Spain) Governorate of Venezuela; (Spain) Governorate of Colombia	Patriot victory: Independence of the Captaincy General of Venezuela; Venezuela becomes a part of Gran Colombia
	Ecuadorian War of Independence (1809–1822)	Patriots: Guayaquil; Gran Colombia; Chile; Peru; United Provinces	Royalists: (Spain) Spanish Empire: Viceroyalty of Peru; Real Audiencia of Quito	Patriot victory: Annexation of the territory to independent Gran Colombia
	Dissolution of Gran Colombia (1826-1831)	Colombia	Venezuelan Separatists; Ecuadorian Separatists	Defeat: Dissolution of Gran Colombia into the republics of Venezuela, Ecuador and New Granada
	Gran Colombia–Peru War (1828–1829)	Gran Colombia	Peru	Stalemate: Status quo ante bellum
	War of the Cauca (1832)	New Granada	Ecuador	Victory: Neogranadine victory
	Occupation of Bocas del Toro of 1836 (1836)	New Granada	Federal Republic of Central America	Victory: The Republic of New Granada takes possession of the Miskito Coast without Central American resistance
	War of the Supremes (1839–1841)	New Granada; Ecuador	(Republic of New Granada) Supremes	Victory
	Colombian Civil War of 1851 (1851)	New Granada	Conservatives	Victory: Liberation of the slaves
	Colombian Civil War of 1854 (1854)	Constitutionalists: Golgotha Liberals; Conservatives	Melist Government: Draconian Liberals	Victory: José María Melo exiled
	Colombian Civil War of 1860–1862 (1860–1862)	Granadine Confederation	Federal State of Cauca	Defeat: Victory for the Federal State of Cauca and Tomás Cipriano de Mosquera; Formation of the United States of Colombia
	Ecuadorian–Colombian War (1862–1863)	Colombia	Ecuador	Victory
	Colombian Civil War of 1876 (1876–1877)	Colombia: Colombian Liberal Party	Colombian Conservative Party	Victory
	Colombian Civil War (1884–1885) (1884-1885)	Colombia	Radical liberals	Victory: New constitution in 1886, Colombia becomes a unitary republic
	Panama Crisis (1885)	Colombia; Chile	Panamanian Rebels	Victory: Rebellion suppressed; Colón burned
	Italian blockade of Colombia (1885-1899)	Colombia	Kingdom of Italy	Stalemate: Payment of part of the debt
	Colombian Civil War of 1895 (1895)	Colombia: Colombian Conservative Party	Liberal Rebels	Victory
	Curuchupadas (1895-1899)	Ecuadorian Conservatives Colombia	Ecuador: Ecuadorian Radical Liberal Party	Defeat
	Thousand Days War (1899–1902)	Colombia: Colombian Conservative Party	Colombian Liberal Party; Ecuador; Venezuela; Nicaragua; Guatemala	Victory: Continuation of the present day Republic of Colombia
	Separation of Panama from Colombia (1903)	Colombia	United States; Panama	Defeat: Independence of the then department of Panama from Colombia
	Separation of Cauca from Colombia (1909)	Colombia	Interoceanic Republic	Cauca parliamentarians intend to separate from Colombia and create their own state.
	Battle of La Pedrera (1911)	Colombia	Peru	Defeat: the Peruvians take the position after several days of combat
	Separation of Arauca from Colombia (1916)	Colombia	Republic of Arauca	Victory: The Colombian government once again takes control of Arauca
	Colombia–Peru War (1932–1933)	Colombia	Peru	Ceasefire: Status quo ante bellum mediated by the League of Nations
	World War II (1943–1945)	United States; Soviet Union; United Kingdom; China; France; Poland; Canada; Australia; New Zealand; India; South Africa; Yugoslavia; Greece; Denmark; Norway; Netherlands; Belgium; Luxembourg; Czechoslovakia; Brazil; Mexico; Chile; Bolivia; Colombia; Ecuador; Paraguay; Peru; Venezuela; Uruguay; Argentina	Germany; Japan; Italy; Hungary; Romania; Bulgaria; Croatia; Slovakia; Finland; Thailand; Manchukuo; Mengjiang	Victory: Collapse of the German Reich; Fall of Japanese and Italian Empires; Creation of the United Nations; Emergence of the United States and the Soviet Union as superpowers; Beginning of the Cold War
	La Violencia (1948–1958)	Colombia: Armed Forces; Colombian Conservative Party; Guerrillas of Peace (conservative paramilitaries)	Colombian Liberal Party and allied militias: Liberal Guerrillas; Bandits; Colombian Communist Party; Peasant Self-Defense Groups	Stalemate: Creation of the National Front; Colombian conflict
	Korean War (1950–1953)	South Korea; United States; United Kingdom; Canada; Turkey; Australia; Philippines; New Zealand; Thailand; Ethiopia; Greece; France; Colombia; Belgium; South Africa; Netherlands; Luxembourg	North Korea; China; Soviet Union	Ceasefire: North Korean invasion of South Korea repelled.; UN invasion of North Korea repelled.; Chinese invasion of South Korea repelled.; Korean Demilitarized Zone established, little territorial change at the 38th parallel border, essentially uti possidetis.
	Colombian Conflict (1964–present)	Colombia Supported by: Peru; Panama; Mexico; Brazil; Ecuador; United States; Spain; United Kingdom	Colombian drug cartels and paramilitaries: La Oficina Cartel (1993–); Clan del Golfo (2001–); Los Rastrojos (2004–); Los Pachenca (2006–); Black Eagles (2006–2011); Ex-FARC Mafia (Since 2016 or 2017); AUC (1997–08); AAA (1978–99); CONVIVIR (1994–07); ACCU (1964–2009); Los Paisas (2008–14); Libertadores del Vichada (2010–17); Bloque Meta (2010–17); ERPAC (1964–2010); Cali Cartel (1975–95); Medellín Cartel (1972–93); Norte del Valle Cartel (1985–2008); North Coast Cartel (1980–2010); MAS (1981–90); La Empresa Cartel (1990- ); La Guajira Cartel (1990- ); Supported by: Contras (1979–90) Mexican drug cartels and paramilitaries: Sinaloa Cartel (1990–); Tijuana Cartel (1987–); CJNG (2009–); Gulf Cartel (1986–); Juárez Cartel (1989–); Los Zetas (1997–); BLO (2008–14); Guadalajara Cartel (1978–89); La Familia Michoacana (1980s–2011); Milenio Cartel (1995–2010); Colombian rebel guerrilla groups: FARC dissidents (2016–); CGSB (1987–90); FARC (1964–2017); FARIP (1987–1996); M-19 (1974–90); ELN (1964–); MOEC (1964–95); ERP (1985–2007); ERG (1964–2008); EPL/Los Pelusos (1967–); ERC (1964–92); PRT (1964–91); MAQL (1984–91); Supported by: Venezuela; Cuba; Belarus (from 2008); Nicaragua (alleged); Libya (until 2011); Soviet Union (until 1989); Albania (financial support; 1960s–1970s); Cartel of the Suns; FBL; Shining Path (factions); ETA (1964–2018); PIRA (1969–98); PKK	Ongoing: Colombia–FARC peace deal in 2016; Start of Catatumbo campaign in 2018; El Caguán DMZ (1999–2002)
	Operation Traíra (1991)	Brazil; Colombia	FARC	Victory: Successful operation against FARC
	Operation Atalanta (2015)	European Union; Colombia	Pirates	Victory: Prevent acts of piracy off the coast of Somalia; Instruct allied nations on naval and structural operations
	Operation Ocean Shield (2015)	NATO; Colombia; Japan	Pirates	Victory: Prevent acts of piracy off the coast of Somalia; Escort ships from the United Nations World Food Programme
	Catatumbo campaign	Colombia: 2nd Division	Popular Liberation Army (EPL) National Liberation Army (ELN): Nororiental de Guerra; Los Rastrojos FARC dissidents	Ongoing
