= List of paramilitary organizations =

Royal Canadian Mounted Police Emergency Response Team officers detain a role player aboard the survey research vessel R-V Strait Hunter, which was simulating a migrant vessel during exercise Frontier Sentinel 2012 in Sydney, Nova Scotia 120508-N-IL267-013

Paramilitary is a military force that is not a part of a country's official or legitimate armed forces. The Oxford English Dictionary traces the use of the term "paramilitary" as far back as 1934.

Paramilitaries use combat-capable kit/equipment (such as internal security/SWAT vehicles), or even actual military equipment (such as long guns and armored personnel carriers; usually military surplus resources), skills (such as battlefield medicine and bomb disposal), and tactics (such as urban warfare and close-quarters combat) that are compatible with their purpose, often combining them with skills from other relevant fields such as law enforcement, coast guard, or search and rescue. A paramilitary may fall under the command of a military, train alongside them, or have permission to use their resources, despite not actually being part of them.

== List of governmental paramilitary organizations ==
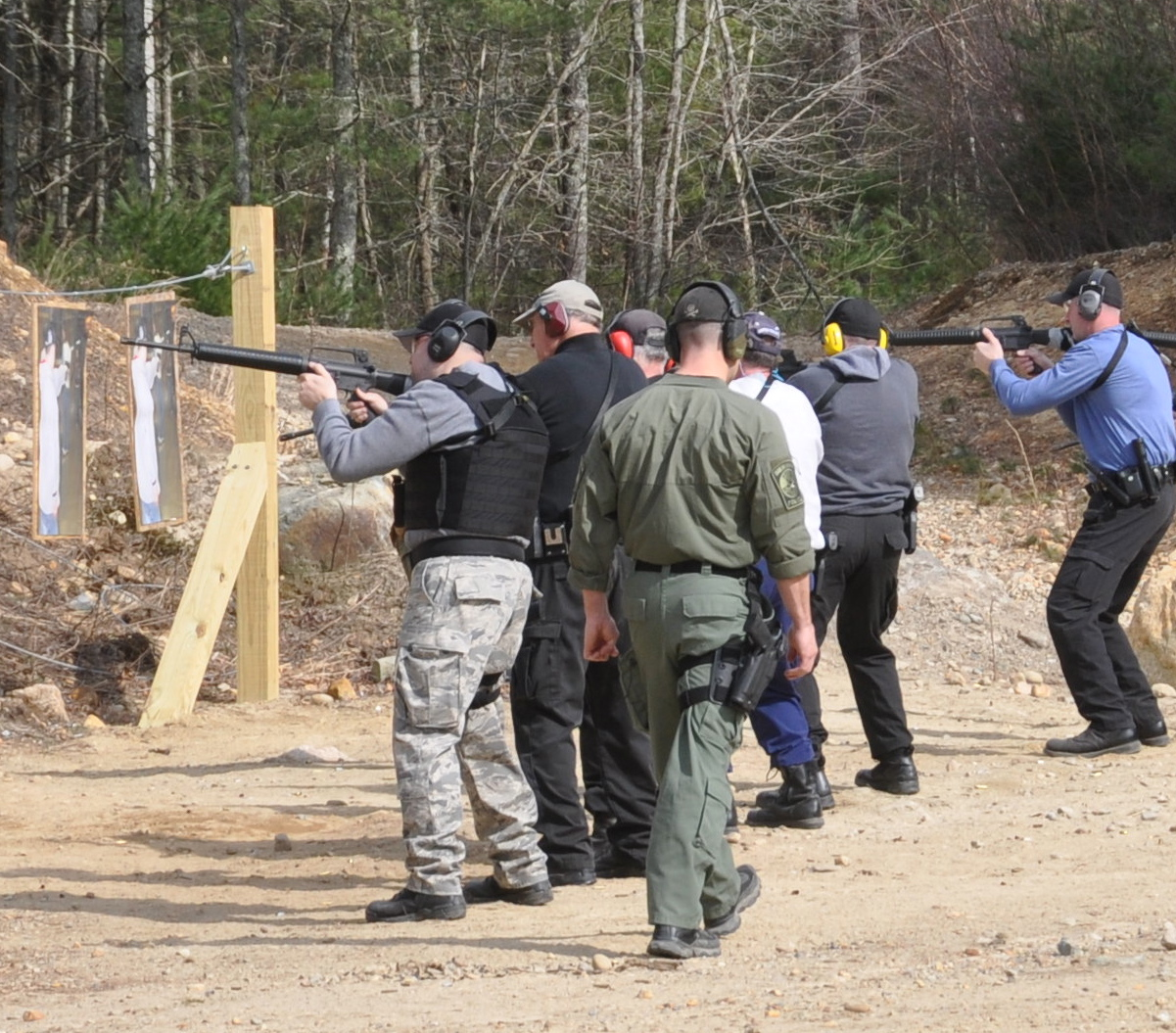
SWAT team training with M-16 style rifles

=== Africa ===
==== Egypt ====
- Central Security Forces

==== Libya (Libyan House of Representatives) ====
- Avengers of Blood

==== Mauritius ====
- Special Mobile Force

==== Nigeria ====
- Nigeria Immigration Service (NIS)
- Federal Road Safety Corps (FRSC)
- Nigeria Security and Civil Defence Corps
- Safety and Traffic Cadet Corps
- Federal Fire Service
- Nigeria Correctional Service
- Nigeria Customs Service
- National Drug Law Enforcement Agency
- Department of State Services

==== Sudan ====
- Janjaweed (~1970s - 2020 but continues in successors units)
- Rapid Support Forces (2013, partially a successor of the Janjaweed until 2023)
- Popular Defence Forces

==== Somaliland ====
- SSB

=== Americas ===
==== Canada ====
- The Emergency Response Team (RCMP)
  - Marine Emergency Response Team

==== Costa Rica ====
The Public Force of Costa Rica is responsible for law enforcement duties, acting as both a civilian police force and gendarmerie. In addition to ordinary policing, it is responsible for border patrol, counter-insurgency, riot control, tourism security, and coast guard duties.

==== Peru ====
- The Rondas campesinas are community-based groups in Peru, formed initially to combat cattle rustling and later in response to the Shining Path insurgency. They function primarily as local self-defense and law enforcement entities, especially in rural areas with limited government presence.

==== United States ====
- CIA Special Activities Center, Special Operations Group
- DOE Federal Protective Forces
- DOE Office of Secure Transportation
- FBI SWAT
- FBI Hostage Rescue Team
- United States Marshals Service
- National Lancers
- SWAT
- ICE
- USSS (United States Secret Service)

==== Venezuela ====
- Venezuelan National Guard
- Bolivarian Militia of Venezuela

=== Asia ===
==== Bangladesh ====
Name	Active Since	Type	Comments	Size	Ref(s)
Bangladesh Ansar	12 February 1948	Gendarmerie	Largest paramilitary force in the world	6.4 million	
Border Guard Bangladesh	29 June 1792 (As Ramgarh Local Battalion)	Border surveillance and internal security personnel		70,000	
Bangladesh Coast Guard	14 February 1995	Marine border and security personnel		3,339	
Bangladesh National Cadet Corps	23 March 1979	Volunteer reserve	Provides Basic Military training to students from schools, colleges and universities.	23,968	Official website

==== China (People's Republic of China) ====
Name	Active Since	Type	Comments	Size	Ref(s)
People's Armed Police	19 June 1982	Gendarmerie		1.5 million	
Xinjiang Production and Construction Corps	1954	State-owned enterprise Paramilitary organisation		unknown, officially 2.6 million employees	
Militia of China	1927	Militia for general national defense mobilization		8,000,000	
Maritime Militia of China	1949-1950	Naval militia		Unknown.	

==== Taiwan (Republic of China) ====
Name	Active Since	Type	Comments	Size	Ref(s)
National Police Agency	5 July 1972	Law enforcement agency			
Thunder Squad	1985	Localized Police tactical unit		200	
Special Operations Group		Elite Paramilitary Special Forces Police tactical unit			

==== Hong Kong ====
Name	Active Since	Type	Comments	Size	Ref(s)
Civil Aid Service	1952	Emergency Response/Search and Rescue Civil Agency		112 full time; 3,634 adult members and 3,232 cadet members	
Government Flying Service	1993	Paramilitary Law Enforcement related Air support services		335	
Hong Kong Police Force		Police force	For subdivisions, see Structure of the Hong Kong Police Force.	Disciplined officers: 33,210 (2023); Auxiliary officers: 4,501 (2021), Unsworn: 4,735 (2023)	
Special Duties Unit	23 July 1974	Elite Paramilitary Special Forces Police tactical unit		Over 120	
Counter Terrorism Response Unit	July 2009	Anti-terrorism patrol-type Police tactical unit		141 (2011)	

==== India ====
Name	Active Since	Type	Comments	Size	Ref(s)
Assam Rifles	1835	Border Guarding and law enforcement force	Indo-Myanmmar Border and Internal security	65,678	
CRPF	27 July 1937	A central police force whose job is to assist state government, police or other agencies at time of their needs	Internal security	313,678	
ITBP	1962	Border Guarding and Law enforcement force which operates on the Indo - Chinese borders	Border guarding and Himmalyan security	89,432	
Sashastra Seema Bal	20 December 1963	Border guarding force of India deployed along its borders with Nepal and Bhutan	Border guarding	94,261	
BSF	1 December 1965	Largest border guarding force anywhere in the world	Indo-Pakistan and Indo-Bangladesh borders	290,000	
CISF	10 March 1969	Guard Sensitive National Assets	Internal protection and security	190,000	
NSG	16 October 1984	Counter-terrorism force	This force recruits its personnel from the police, paramilitary and Army from all around the India with the maximum service tenure of five years.	10,000	

==== Indonesia ====
Name	Active Since	Type	Comments	Size	Ref(s)
Detachment 88	30 June 2003	Police tactical unit		1,300	
Mobile Brigade Corps	14 November 1945	Police tactical unit		34,250 (2008)	

==== Japan ====
Name	Active Since	Type	Comments	Size	Ref(s)
National Police Agency	1 July 1954	Law enforcement agency		7,995 (2020)	
Special Assault Team	1977	Elite Paramilitary Special Forces Police tactical unit		Approx. 300	

==== North Korea (Democratic People's Republic of Korea) ====
Name	Active Since	Type	Comments	Size	Ref(s)
People's Border Guards		Border surveillance and internal security personnel			
Worker-Peasant Red Guards	January 1959	Paramilitary militia		5 million	

==== South Korea (Republic of Korea) ====
Name	Active Since	Type	Comments	Size	Ref(s)
National Police Agency	1 August 1991	Law enforcement agency		126,227 (2020)	
Special Operations Unit		Elite Paramilitary Special Forces Police tactical unit			

==== Malaysia ====
- Pasukan Gerakan Am as Paramilitary Force
- People's Volunteer Corps of Ministry of Home Affairs
- 69 Komando PGK as Multi Spectrum Special Force

==== Nepal ====
Name	Active Since	Type	Comments	Size	Ref(s)
Armed Police Force	24 October 2001	Counter-insurgency Specialised Police Force		35,000	

==== Pakistan ====
Paramilitary forces under the Ministry of Interior
Name	Active Since	Type	Comments	Size	Ref(s)
Civil Armed Forces	1947	Border control and Law enforcement agency	Operates under the Federal Ministry of interior during peace time but falls under the Ministry of Defense during war time, led by officers from the Pakistani Military.	291,000	
Pakistan Rangers	7 October 1958	Law enforcement agency	Punjab Rangers	16,100	
Pakistan Rangers	7 October 1958	Law enforcement agency	Sindh Rangers	24,630	
Frontier Corps	1907	Border control and Law enforcement agency	Frontier Corps KPK (North)	70,000	
Frontier Corps	1907	Border control and Law enforcement agency	Frontier Corps KPK (South)	70,000	
Frontier Corps	1907	Border control and Law enforcement agency	Frontier Corps Balochistan (North)	70,000	
Frontier Corps	1907	Border control and Law enforcement agency	Frontier Corps Balochistan (South)	70,000	
Pakistan Coast Guard	1971	Maritime law enforcement agency		15,000	
Gilgit Baltistan Scouts	2003	Law enforcement agency		4,962	
Frontier Constabulary	1915	Law enforcement agency		33,000	
Federal Investigation Agency	13 January 1975	Criminal investigation, counter-intelligence and security agency			
National Highways & Motorway Police	26 November 1997	Law enforcement agency			
Pakistan Railways Police	1977	Law enforcement agency			

Paramilitary forces under the Ministry of Defense
Name	Active Since	Type	Comments	Size	Ref(s)
Pakistan Maritime Security Agency	1 January 1987	Maritime law enforcement agency		2,000	
Defence Security Force	1947	Safeguarding national institutions, military establishments and installations			
Pakistan National Guard	3 January 1948	Military reserve force		185,000(approx)	
Anti-Narcotics Force	21 February 1955				
Airports Security Force	1976	Airport security		14,560	

==== Philippines ====
Name	Active Since	Type	Comments	Size	Ref(s)
Citizen Armed Force Geographical Unit	25 July 1987	Auxiliary unit		60,000 (2007)	
Special Action Force					

==== Sri Lanka ====
Name	Active Since	Type	Comments	Size	Ref(s)
Special Task Force	1983	Elite Paramilitary – Special Operations Forces		8000(approx)	

==== Thailand ====
Name	Active Since	Type	Comments	Size	Ref(s)
Border Patrol Police					
Marine Paramilitary Task Force					
Paramilitary Marine Regiment, Royal Thai Navy			Also known as Thahan Phran Marines		
Thahan Phran			Also known as Thai Rangers		
Village Scouts					
Volunteer Defense Corps	10 February 1954	Security Forces		Unknown	

==== Vietnam ====
- Vietnam Militia and Self-Defence Force

=== Europe ===
==== Albania ====
- RENEA

==== Estonia ====
- Estonian Defence League

==== Finland ====
- Border Guard
- Police Rapid Response Unit

==== France ====
- Action Division of DGSE
- National Gendarmerie
- Marseille Naval Fire Battalion of the French Navy
- Paris Fire Brigade of the French Army

==== Georgia ====
- Mkhedrioni
- Monadire

==== Italy ====
Name	Active Since	Type	Comments	Size	Ref(s)
Arma dei Carabinieri	13 July 1814	Gendarmerie		110.000 (2023)	
Guardia di Finanza	1 October 1774	Gendarmerie		68.000 (2015)	

==== Lithuania ====
- Lithuanian Riflemen's Union
- State Border Guard Service
- Public Security Service

==== Netherlands ====
- Special Intervention Service

==== Poland ====
- BOA KGP

==== Portugal ====
- Guarda Nacional Republicana (National Republican Guard)

==== Russia ====
- Paramilitary security in Russia
- Registered Cossacks of the Russian Federation
- Kadyrovtsy
- Fakel (allegedly)
- Wagner Group (since 2023)
- Redut (since 2022)
- Africa Corps

==== Turkey ====
- Village Guards

==== Ukraine ====
- Noman Çelebicihan Battalion
- Freedom of Russia Legion
- Sheikh Mansur Battalion (since 2022)

==== United Kingdom ====
- The London Metropolitan Police Specialist Firearms Command CO19.
- The London Metropolitan Police Counter Terrorism Command - SO15.
- The London Metropolitan Police Aviation Security Operational Command Unit - SO18.

=== Middle East ===
==== Iran ====
- Islamic Revolutionary Guard Corps
  - Basij

==== Iraq ====
- Peshmerga
- Popular Mobilization Forces

==== Israel ====
- Magav

==== Syria ====
- National Defence Forces

=== Oceania ===
==== Australia ====
- Australian Border Force

== List of private paramilitary organizations ==
=== Africa ===
==== Somalia ====
- Raskamboni Front

==== Sudan ====
- Rapid Support Forces (since 2023)

=== Americas ===
==== Colombia ====
- AUC
- AAA
- CONVIVIR
- Peasant Self-Defense Forces of Córdoba and Urabá (ACCU)
- Los Paisas
- Black Eagles
- Los Rastrojos
- Libertadores del Vichada
- Bloque Meta
- ERPAC

See also Right-wing paramilitarism in Colombia.

==== Mexico ====
- Zapatista Army of National Liberation
- Popular Revolutionary Army

==== United States ====
- 3 Percenters
- Arizona Border Recon
- Hutaree
- Idaho Light Foot Militia
- Michigan Militia
- Militia of Montana
- Missouri Citizens Militia
- New York Light Foot Militia
- Oath Keepers
- Ohio Defense Force
- Texas Light Foot Militia
- Fruit of Islam, paramilitary wing of the Nation of Islam
- The Sea Organization, more commonly known as the Sea Org, paramilitary wing of the Church of Scientology. The Sea Org is not exclusively located in the United States.

=== Asia ===
==== Cambodia ====
- Cambodian Freedom Fighters (CFF) (Cholana Kangtoap Serei Cheat Kampouchea): Rebel group in Cambodia
- Royal Gendarmerie of Cambodia

==== India ====
===== Hindutva =====
- Abhinav Bharat
- Hindu Munnani
- Hindu Sena
- Hindu Yuva Vahini
- Ranvir Sena
- Rashtriya Swayamsevak Sangh
- Sri Ram Sena

===== Islamism =====
- Al-Qaeda in the Indian subcontinent
- Darsgah-Jihad-O-Shahadat
- Indian Mujahideen
- Islamic State – Hind Province
- Popular Front of India
- Students' Islamic Movement of India

===== Khalistan =====
- Babbar Khalsa
- Bhindranwale Tiger Force of Khalistan
- Dashmesh Regiment
- International Sikh Youth Federation
- Khalistan Commando Force
- Khalistan Liberation Force
- Khalistan Tiger Force
- Khalistan Zindabad Force

===== Northeast India =====
- United National Liberation Front of Western South East Asia
- Kamtapur Liberation Organisation
- United Liberation Front of Asom
- Kangleipak Communist Party
- Kuki National Army
- Kuki National Front
- Maoist Communist Party of Manipur
- People's Liberation Army of Manipur
- United National Liberation Front
- Hynniewtrep National Liberation Council
- National Socialist Council of Nagaland

===== Naxalite–Maoist =====
- Communist Party of India (Maoist)
  - People's Liberation Guerrilla Army (India)
- People's Liberation Front of India
- Tritiya Prastuti Committee

==== Indonesia ====
- Pancasila Youth
- Free Aceh Movement: Regional separatist group in Aceh, Indonesia. Also known as Aceh Security Disturbance Movement.

==== Malaysia ====
- Barisan Revolusi Nasional (BRN): National separatist group in Malaysia and Thailand
- Barisan Nasional Pembebasan Patani (BNPP): Islamic insurgent group in Malaysia and Thailand

==== Myanmar ====
- Eastern Shan State Army
- Mong Tai Army (MTA): Armed drug cartel
- National Democratic Alliance Army (NDAA)
- United Wa State Army (UWSA): Autonomous military group in Wa State
- Myanmar National Democratic Alliance Army (MNDAA): Also known as the Kokang Army, a Kokang nationalist group active in Myanmar.
- Karen National Liberation Army
- Kachin Independence Army: Group in North Burma which occupies most of Kachin State.
- Shan State Army - North
- Shan State Army - South

==== Philippines ====
- Abu Sayyaf Group (ASG): Islamic separatist group in the southern Philippines. Also known as Al Harakut Al Islamiyya.
- Alex Boncayao Brigade (ABB): Urban militant group of the Communist Party of the Philippines
- Bagani: A counter insurgency group operating in Cabanglasan.
- Ilaga (1971-1979): Christian extremist paramilitary group in the Southern Philippines. They battled against the Moro National Liberation Front and Moro Islamic Liberation Front.
- Alamara: A counterinsurgency operating across the central-eastern side of Mindanao

==== Sri Lanka ====
- Eelam People's Democratic Party

==== Thailand ====
- Barasi Revolusi Nasional (BRN): National separatist group in Malaysia and Thailand
- Barisan National Pember-Basan Pattani (BNPP): Islamic insurgent group in Malaysia and Thailand

==== Pakistan ====
===== Kashmir =====
- Jaish-e-Mohammed
- Lashkar-e-Taiba
- Islamic State in Jammu and Kashmir
- Harkat-ul-Jihad al-Islami
- Harkat-ul-Mujahideen
- Hizbul Mujahideen
- People's Anti-Fascist Front
- The Resistance Front
- United Jihad Council

===== Balochistan =====
- Balochistan Liberation Army
- Balochistan Liberation Front

=== Europe ===
==== Kosovo ====
- Albanian National Army
- Northern Brigade

==== Bosnia and Herzegovina ====
- Green Berets
- Serbian Honour. A Russian-trained and -funded paramilitary unit acting in support of separatist leader Milorad Dodik.

==== Croatia ====
- Ustaše Militia acted as a para-military unit, an auxiliary part of the WW2 Croatian Nazi Puppet State's Armed Forces
- HOS-Hrvatske obrambene snage right wing para-military organisation, later absorbed in regular Croatian military during homeland war for independence 1991-1995.
- Croatian National Legion

==== Georgia ====
- Algeti Wolves: Georgian group which carried out anti-Russian attacks in the 1990s
- Merab Kostava Society
- White Eagles
- Forest Brothers
- White Legion

==== Ireland ====
- Óglaigh na hÉireann (OnH) (2006–09): Small dissident Irish republican group, split from the Continuity IRA.
- Óglaigh na hÉireann (OnH) (2009–): Dissident Irish republican group, split from the Real IRA due to differences in leadership and factionalism.
- The Real IRA: Small Irish Republican group which split from the Provisional IRA in 1997. Most brigades merged with other republican groups in 2012, with holdouts remaining in Cork and Dublin.
- The Continuity IRA: Small Irish Republican group which split from the Provisional IRA in 1986.

==== Russia ====
- Russian Orthodox Army
- Interbrigades
- Russian Imperial Movement
- Wagner Group (until 2023)
- Patriot (company)
- Rusich Group

==== Turkey ====
- Grey Wolves

==== Ukraine ====
- Atesh (movement)
- Berdiansk Partisan Army
- Misanthropic Division
- Popular Resistance of Ukraine
- Russian Volunteer Corps
- Ukrainian National Self Defense (till 2022)
- Sheikh Mansur Battalion (till 2019)
- Golden Guard

==== United Kingdom ====
There are a number of paramilitary organisations in the United Kingdom, most of them operate in and around Northern Ireland and are a continuation of the various paramilitary groups which operated in Northern Ireland during The Troubles. Apart from these, there are a small number of white supremacist paramilitary organisations which operate in the United Kingdom.

- Real Irish Republican Army (RIRA): Dissident republican group mainly in Northern Ireland
- Ulster Defence Association (UDA): Ulster loyalist group formed in September 1971.
- Ulster Resistance (UR or URM): Ulster loyalist group formed in November 1986, operating in mainly in Northern Ireland
- Ulster Volunteer Force (UVF): Ulster loyalist group formed in 1966, which is not related to the Ulster Volunteers. Operated mainly in Northern Ireland
- Combat 18 - British Neo-Nazi group
- Red Hand Commando (RHC): Ulster loyalist paramilitary group, linked to the Ulster Volunteer Force
- Loyalist Volunteer Force (LVF): Ulster loyalist group, split from the UVF's Mid-Ulster Brigade.
- Irish National Liberation Army (INLA) (1974–): Split from the Official IRA in opposition to the OIRA's 1972 ceasefire. Mainly in Northern Ireland
- Irish People's Liberation Organisation (IPLO) (1986–92): Formed by expelled and disaffected members of the INLA after that group started to reduce operations in the mid 1980s. The group were heavily involved in drug dealing and other criminal activities and were forcibly shut down in 1992 by the Provisional IRA.
- Irish Republican Liberation Army (IRLA) (2006–): A "self-styled vigilante group" that split from the Continuity IRA. Linked to the Loyalist Volunteer Force according to some sources.
- The name Irish Republican Army (IRA) has been used by many Irish republican groups in the 20th and 21st centuries. The following names are commonly used by the media and security services, but each group referred to themselves solely as the Irish Republican Army (IRA), and generally rejected the legitimacy of the others.
  - Irish Volunteers (1913–16) Set up to counter the Ulster Volunteers but was shut down after the Easter Rising and formed the I.R.A. (1917–22)
  - Irish Republican Army (1917–22): The original IRA, which was the official defence force of the Irish Republic and fought in the Irish War of Independence.
  - Irish Republican Army (1922–69): The anti-treaty continuation of the original IRA, active during the Irish Civil War, IRA Sabotage Campaign, Northern Campaign, Border Campaign and the Troubles.
  - Official IRA (OIRA) (1969–72): The Official IRA was formed after a split in 1969 between different factions of the 1922 IRA. The OIRA became a more overtly political movement, advocating Marxist–Leninist principles.
  - Provisional IRA (PIRA) (1969–2005): Also known as the Provos, the Provisional IRA was the more militarily active of the two IRAs created out of the 1969 split.
  - Continuity IRA (CIRA) (1986–): Split from the Provisional IRA when that group dropped its policy of abstentionism in relation to Dáil Éireann.
  - Real IRA (RIRA) (1997–): Known in the media as the New IRA since their 2012 merger with Republican Action Against Drugs and other smaller republican militant groups, they split from the Provisional IRA over that group's support for the Irish peace process and the Good Friday Agreement.
- Meibion Glyndŵr (1979-93) - Welsh Nationalist group mainly in Wales.
- Free Wales Army (FWA) (1963-69): Welsh Nationalist group active mainly in Wales.
- Scottish National Liberation Army (SNLA/Tartan Terrorists) (1980-): Scottish Nationalist group active mainly in Scotland.
- Arm nan Gàidheal (AnG) (1980s-1990s): Scottish Nationalist paramilitary with support from Siol nan Gaidheal.
- Cornish National Liberation Army (CNLA) (early 2000s): Cornish Nationalist paramilitary active mostly in Cornwall

=== Middle East ===
==== Iran ====
- Ansar-e Hezbollah

==== Lebanon ====
- Hezbollah

==== Palestine ====
- Palestinian Joint Operations Room
- Al-Qassam Brigades of Hamas
- Al-Quds Brigades of the Palestinian Islamic Jihad
- Al-Aqsa Martyrs Brigades
- Al-Nasser Salah al-Deen Brigades of the Popular Resistance Committees
- Abu Ali Mustafa Brigades of the PFLP
- National Resistance Brigades of the DFLP
- Mujahideen Brigades of the Palestinians Mujahideen Movement

=== Multinational ===
- Nordic Strength
- Sea Org: Scientology elite group with roots in naval tradition including time spent at Sea in a fleet of ships during the 1960s and 1970s. Became land based in 1975. Dress in uniforms, live communally in barracks, and are organized around naval ranks. Some dispute whether it is paramilitary.

== See also ==
- List of defunct paramilitary organizations
- List of police tactical units
- List of private military contractors
- List of private security companies
- List of countries by number of military and paramilitary personnel
- Police tactical unit
- Militia
- Military volunteer
- Mercenary
- List of designated terrorist groups
- Violent non-state actor
- Private army
- Narcoterrorism
