= Mario Montoya Uribe =

Former Colombian military general (born 1949)

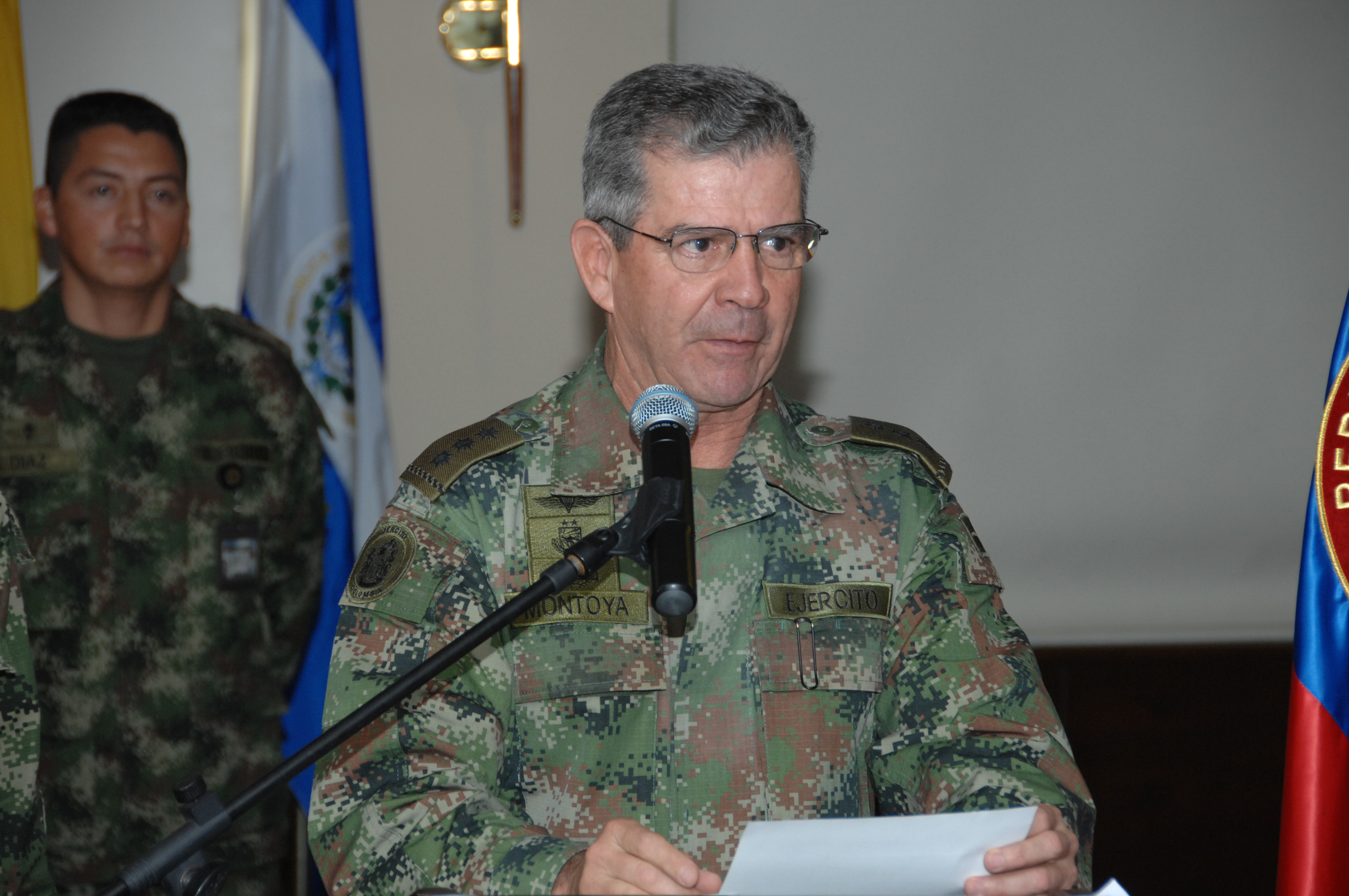
- Uribe in 2008
- Born: 29 April 1949 (age 77); Buga, Valle del Cauca
- Military career
- Allegiance: Colombia
- Branch: Army
- Rank: General
- Commands: Company Commander at the Military School of Cadets; No. 5 Cavalry Group Commander (Cúcuta, N.S.); No. 4 Intelligence Battalion (Villavicencio, Meta); Cavalry School Director; Operative Command No. 9 Commander (Bagre, Antioquia); 18th Brigade Commander, (Arauca). Commander of the Caribbean Joint Command; Army Intelligence Director; Joint Task Force of the South Commander; Fourth Brigade Commander; First Division Commander
- Conflicts: Colombian Armed Conflict
- Awards: Order of the Libertadores "Cruz de Boyacá"; Distinguished Services in Public Order for first, second, third, fourth, fifth and sixth time. Order to the Military Merit Gral. Antonio Nariño, in the Officer and Commander categories Distinguished services from the Marine Corps; Order to the Military Merit Admiral Padilla; Order to the Aeronautical Military Merit Order to the Military Merit from the Lancer’s School; United States of America Army Medal; Order from the Chamber of Representatives; Distinguished services to the National Police for first and second time Distinguished services to the Military School; Distinguished services to the National Police in the category of Commander for second time Medal from the Non Commissioned Officer’s School; Medal from the Military School of cadets Order from the Congress; Service Badges for 15, 20,25 and 30 years

Mario Montoya Uribe (born 29 April 1949) is a former military general and commander of the Colombian National Army (Spanish: Ejército Nacional de Colombia), until his resignation on November 4, 2008, following the "false positives" scandal, involving the deaths of 11 civilians at the hands of the military. Montoya holds a graduate title in senior management from Los Andes University. He has trained in armored vehicle courses in Fort Knox, Kentucky and served as the army, navy and air attaché at the Colombian embassy in London, England. Montoya was succeeded by General Óscar González on November 6, 2008, as commander of the Colombian National Army.

In September 2010, Montoya, now Colombia's ambassador to the Dominican Republic, was charged with murder by an Ecuadorean court for his role in the 2008 incursion of the Colombian military into Ecuador, which destroyed a FARC camp and left more than people 20 dead.

== Colombian National Army career ==
=== Commands ===
During Montoya's military career he has commanded the following units of the Colombian National Army:

1. Company Commander at the Military School of Cadets
2. No. 5 Cavalry Group Commander (Cúcuta, N.S.)
3. No. 4 Intelligence Battalion (Villavicencio, Meta)
4. Cavalry School Director
5. Operative Command No. 9 Commander (Bagre, Antioquia)
6. 18th Brigade Commander, (Arauca).
7. Commander of the Caribbean Joint Command
8. Army Intelligence Director
9. Joint Task Force of the South Commander
10. Fourth Brigade Commander
11. First Division Commander

=== Honors ===
The following honors have been bestowed upon Mario Montoya Uribe for his service:

1. Order of the Libertadores "Cruz de Boyacá"
2. Distinguished Services in Public Order for first, second, third, fourth, fifth and sixth time.
3. Order of Military Merit José María Córdova, in the Officer and Commander category
4. Order of Military Merit Antonio Nariño, in the Officer and Commander categories
5. Distinguished services from the Marine Corps
6. Order of Naval Merit Admiral Padilla
7. Order to the Aeronautical Military Merit Order to the Military Merit from the Lancer’s School
8. United States of America Army Medal
9. Order from the Chamber of Representatives
10. Distinguished services to the National Police for first and second time
11. Distinguished services to the Military School
12. San Jorge Medal
13. Distinguished services to the National Police in the category of Commander for second time
14. Medal from the Non Commissioned Officer’s School
15. Medal from the Military School of cadets
16. Order from the Congress
17. Service Badges for 15, 20,25 and 30 years

== Controversy ==
There have been several controversial accusations regarding different events during General Mario Montoya's military career.

=== BINCI and AAA ===
A declassified 1979 report from the United States Embassy in Bogotá, Colombia details a plan for the foundation of the Anticommunist American Alliance (Spanish: Alianza Americana Anticomunista) (AAA) by General Jorge Robledo Pulido and the Colombian National Army's Battalion of Intelligence and Counterintelligence (BINCI). The AAA and BINCI have been linked to a number of bombings, kidnappings and assassinations against leftists and guerrilla detainees between the years of 1978 and 1979.

Then-Lieutenant Montoya served in BINCI at the time and was mentioned in a November 29, 1980 article published by the Mexican newspaper El Día, containing allegations about BINCI's and AAA's activities as told by five individuals identified as former Colombian military. Lieutenant Montoya is mentioned as a participant in the bombing of the Communist newspaper Voz Proletaria. A 1992 human rights publication, El Terrorismo de Estado en Colombia (State Terrorism in Colombia), was based on the previous El Día article and repeated many of its claims.

In 1999 the U.S. Defense Intelligence Agency (DIA) found no evidence to support the charges against Montoya, citing the previously known information as "a NGO smear campaign dating back 20 years."

=== Operation Orion ===
In March 2007 a report by the United States Central Intelligence Agency (CIA) was leaked to the Los Angeles Times by an anonymous U.S. government employee who was said to be unsatisfied by the Bush administration's handling of the Colombian government's accountability. The report detailed a number of claims concerning links between Colombian security forces and illegal paramilitary groups. According to the CIA document, an allied Western intelligence agency reported the existence of such links during a 2002 Medellín offensive carried out against the Revolutionary Armed Forces of Colombia (Spanish: Fuerzas Armadas Revolucionarias de Colombia) (FARC) under the title of "Operation Orion". While the operation was considered a success, there were allegations that over 40 people had disappeared during the operation and that the impending power vacuum was filled by paramilitary forces. The Western intelligence agency mentioned in the report considered that, the source of the claim was yet-unproven. A Defense attaché to the United States Embassy in Bogotá told the Los Angeles Times that "this report confirms information provided by a proven source."

General Mario Montoya was commander of the area police force during the operation. The report cites an informant who claimed that plans for the attack were signed by General Montoya and paramilitary leader Fabio Jaramillo, who was a subordinate of Diego Fernando Murillo Bejarano, also known as Don Berna. Don Berna became known for taking over the drug trade around Medellín after drug kingpin Pablo Escobar was killed.

The CIA did not confirm nor deny the authenticity of the report. CIA spokesman Paul Gimigliano stated that "by describing what it calls a leaked CIA report containing material from another intelligence service — and unconfirmed material at that — the Los Angeles Times makes it less likely that friendly countries will share information with the United States" and "that ultimately could affect our ability to protect Americans". Douglas Frantz, a managing editor of the Los Angeles Times, responded that "we listened carefully to the CIA concerns and agreed to withhold details that the agency said jeopardized certain sources and ongoing operations, but our judgment is that the significance of the issues raised in this story warrant its publication."

The President of Colombia, Álvaro Uribe (no relation to Montoya Uribe), has denied any links between his government and paramilitary forces.

== See also ==
- Colombian Armed Conflict
- Communism in Colombia
- Irregular military
- Paramilitarism in Colombia
- Paramilitary forces
- Revolutionary Armed Forces of Colombia
