= Harold Bedoya Pizarro =

Colombian general

Harold Bedoya Pizarro (December 30, 1938 in Cali, Colombia – May 2, 2017 in Hospital Militar de Bogota) was a general and commander of the Colombian National Army. Bedoya also ran for President of Colombia in the 1998 and 2002 elections.

== Military career ==
Bedoya's military training began at the Jose Maria Córdova Military Academy in September 1955, where he received the rank of infantry second lieutenant. In 1965 he attended the School of the Americas and trained in military intelligence, later returning in 1979 as a guest professor.

In 1987 he was promoted to commander of the Seventh Brigade, Villavicencio, where he developed the plan of dismantling the laboratories and eradication of illicit activities by the Revolutionary Armed Forces of Colombia (Spanish: Fuerzas Armadas Revolucionarias de Colombia)(FARC). Three years later he was given the position of commander of the Fourth Brigade in Medellín, Antioquia, where he participated in anti-narcotic operations against drug kingpin Pablo Escobar. In 1991 Bedoya was given the position of director of the Superior Military School in Bogotá, Cundinamarca. The following year he was again promoted to deputy commander of the Northeastern Division, a position he held for three years before being finally promoted in 1996 to commander-in-chief of the armed forces, where he replaced Admiral Holdan Delgado; he held that position for one year.

On July 24, 1997, Bedoya was forced into retirement by then President Ernesto Samper due to his unwillingness to negotiate with the Revolutionary Armed Forces of Colombia (FARC).

== Presidential candidacies ==
In 1998 Bedoya announced his candidacy for President of Colombia, running as an independent for the Force Colombia (Spanish: Fuerza Colombia) party he founded. During his campaign he stressed the importance of ridding Colombia of drug smugglers and stated it as his number one priority. Bedoya stated he did not agree with the prior removal of the Colombian National Army from FARC-controlled territory and, stated he would not negotiate with them until their "narco-based finances have been squeezed."

On April 27, in what was believed to be an attack by rebel groups to destabilize the campaign, five bombs detonated in Bogotá, one at the campaign headquarters of Bedoya. At the end of the first round of voting Bedoya and running mate Jorge Garcia Hurtado were removed from the running after receiving only 193,037 votes, a total of 1.82%. Conservative Andrés Pastrana went on to the second round and, facing off against Liberal Horacio Serpa, eventually became President of Colombia.

In the 2002 elections, Bedoya once again participated as a presidential candidate and ran against Horacio Serpa, Luis Eduardo Garzón, Noemí Sanín, Álvaro Uribe and Íngrid Betancourt. Betancourt would later be kidnapped by FARC rebels during the election season. Bedoya's Force Colombia obtained 50,763 votes, 0.459% of the total. Álvaro Uribe went on to win the election, representing the Colombia First political party.

== Controversy ==
=== Human rights ===
General Bedoya was criticized during the later years of his military career for his past attendance at the School of the Americas, as a number of its graduates have committed human rights violations. Bedoya was also accused of tolerating, working with or doing little to combat paramilitary groups.

=== BINCI and Triple A ===
Bedoya's service in the Batallón Único de Inteligencia y Contrainteligencia (English: Battalion of Intelligence and Counterintelligence) (BINCI) of the Colombian National Army has been linked to the activities of the Anticommunist American Alliance (Spanish: Alianza Americana Anticomunista) (AAA). The BINCI, acting as AAA, has been accused of carrying out a series of bombings against the Colombian Communist Party's Headquarters and its newspaper Voz Proletaria. The AAA has also been accused of engaging in other kidnappings, bombings and assassinations against leftist targets and abuses of guerrilla detainees during the late 1970s .

Then-Lieutenant Colonel Bedoya was mentioned in an open letter published on November 29, 1980, by the Mexican newspaper El Día, in which five individuals identified as former Colombian military detail a number of activities carried out by BINCI personnel operating as Triple A. According to them, Lieutenant Colonel Harold Bedoya, the commander of BINCI, would have given orders to the personnel involved in the bombing of Voz Proletaria.

=== Legal actions against critics ===
Bedoya was criticized for filing slander charges against Father Javier Giraldo, the director of the Intercongregational Commission for Justice and Peace (Spanish: Comisión Intercongregacional de Justicia y Paz). Human Rights groups such as Human Rights Watch and the Organization of American Studies called these slander suits a measure intended to silence critics.

== Death ==
Bedoya Pizarro died at a military clinic in Bogotá from lymphoma on May 2, 2017, at the age of 78.

== See also ==
- Colombian Armed Conflict
- History of Colombia
- Kidnappings in Colombia
- Military of Colombia
- Paramilitarism in Colombia
- Politics of Colombia
- Revolutionary Armed Forces of Colombia
