= BNPP =

BNPP may refer to:

- Bataan Nuclear Power Plant
- Belarusian Nuclear Power Plant
- Barakah Nuclear Power Plant
- Barisan Nasional Pembebasan Patani
- Bangladesh Ninda Prokash Party
- BNP Paribas
- bis (p-nitrophenyl)phosphate, an enzyme inhibitor of the organophosphate class
