= Islamic Liberation Front of Patani =

Islamic militant separatist organization in South Thailand

- Barisan Islam Pembebasan Patani
- Leaders: Tengku Mahmood Mahyideen; Tengku Abdul Jalal
- Dates active: 1947 – present
- Group: Tentara Nasional Pembebasan Rakyat Patani (People's National Liberation Army of Patani)
- Headquarters: Kelantan, Malaysia
- Active regions: Southern Thailand
- Ideology: Separatism; Religious conservatism Nationalism; Islamism
- Wars: the South Thailand insurgency

The Islamic Liberation Front of Patani (Malay: Barisan Islam Pembebasan Patani, abbreviated BIPP), until 1986 known as the National Liberation Front of Patani (NLFP; Malay: Barisan Nasional Pembebasan Patani, BNPP; also translated as "Patani National Liberation Front" or "National Front for the Liberation of Pattani"; Thai: ขบวนการแนวร่วมปลดแอกแห่งชาติปัตตานี) is a militant Islamic separatist movement based in northern Malaysia and with a history of operations in the South Thailand insurgency.

== History ==
The group was formed in 1959 by Tengku Abdul Jalal, aka Adul na Saiburi, and is reputed to be one of the first armed insurgent outfits in the Pattani area. The group had its base in Southern Thailand.

=== Barisan Islam Pembebasan Patani ===
The BNPP was very active in the 1970s and 1980s. It renamed itself to "Islamic Front for the Liberation of Pattani" (BIPP) in 1986. After a period of dormancy, it was revived in 2002. The renewed group has reduced its nationalistic emphasis and expanded its hard-line Islamic politico-religious goals. It is known for its attacks against the Buddhist minorities of Southern Thailand. The political wing of the group participates in Malaysian state-level politics.

== See also ==
- South Thailand insurgency
- List of paramilitary organizations
