= Guerrilla movements in Colombia =

Guerrilla movements in Colombia (Spanish: guerrilleros) refer to the origins, development and actions of guerrilla movements in the Republic of Colombia. In the context of the ongoing Colombian conflict, the term 'guerrilla' is used to refer to left-wing movements, as opposed to right-wing paramilitaries.

== Spanish colonial control ==
Different guerrilla-style movements have appeared in Venezuela and Colombia ever since the Spanish conquest of the Americas. The indigenous peoples were the first to use irregular warfare against the Spanish invaders and colonial administrations.

By the early 19th century, groups of Creoles and mestizos, segregated from the European-born Spaniards, participated in separatist movements opposed to local authorities and later the Spanish monarchy itself. They established "patriotic armies" (Ejércitos patriotas) which included both regular and irregular forces.

== Colombian Civil War of 1860-1862 ==
The Colombian Civil War of May 8, 1860 to November 1862 was an internal conflict between the newly formed conservative Grenadine Confederation and a more liberal rebel force from the newly succeeded region of Cauca, composed of dissatisfied politicians commanded by General Tomás Cipriano de Mosquera, its former president. The Grenadine Confederation, created a few years earlier in 1858 by Mariano Ospina Rodríguez, was defeated in the capital Bogotá, with Mosquera deposing the newly elected president Bartolomé Calvo on July 18, 1861. Forming a provisional government, with himself as president, Mosquera continued to pursue the conservative forces until their final defeat in 1862. The resulting formation of the new United States of Colombia would have significant cultural and economic consequences for Colombia.

== Thousand days civil war ==
The Thousand Days War (1899–1902) (Spanish: Guerra de los Mil Días), was a civil armed conflict in the newly created Republic of Colombia, (including its then province of Panama) between the Conservative Party, the Liberal Party and its radical factions. In 1899 the ruling conservatives were accused of maintaining power through fraudulent elections. The situation was worsened by an economic crisis caused by falling coffee prices in the international market, which mainly affected the opposition Liberal Party, which had lost power.

== La Violencia ==
La Violencia (Spanish pronunciation: [la βjoˈlensja], The Violence) is a period of civil conflict in the Colombian countryside between supporters of the Colombian Liberal Party and the Colombian Conservative Party, a conflict which took place roughly from 1948 to 1958 (sources vary on the exact dates).

Some historians disagree about the dates: some argue it started in 1946 when the Conservatives came back into government, because at a local level the leadership of the police forces and town councils changed hands, encouraging Conservative peasants to seize land from Liberal peasants and setting off a new wave of bi-partisan violence in the countryside. But traditionally, most historians argue that La Violencia began with the death of Jorge Eliécer Gaitán.

The end of La Violencia is disputed, but some say it ended with the creation of a new party that took over the shared control of the government. This party was a collaboration between the Liberal and Conservative party leaders and was called the National Front. The main reason they started this collaboration was because they wanted to end the period of violence that Colombia was going through. One of the conditions of the collaboration was that all other political actors were excluded from the political process. In 1974 the party came to an official end, but still had a say in the government until the 1980s.

== Colombian armed conflict (1960s - present) ==
In the period from 1960 until the 1990s we can distinguish two generations of guerrilla struggles. The first generation is from 1964 until the mid 70s. The main guerrilla movements in this generation are the FARC, ELN and the EPL. The second generation is from 1974 until 1982. In this period there is also another guerrilla movement, the M-19. The period afterwards is called the armed peace period and is from 1982 until 1985.

First generation (1964- mid 70s)

One of the first guerrilla movements was the FARC, established in 1966 as a reaction to the National Front. The FARC was a communist movement that grew out of a rural defense group, who believed they could bring social justice through communism. Their first leader was Manuel ''Sureshot'' Marulanda. Another guerrilla movement, the ELN, was established in the early 60s by students who got their ideas from the revolution in Cuba.

Second generation (1974-1982)

In the 1970s multiple guerrilla movements emerged in Colombia. One of these groups was the 19th of April Movement, the M-19. This group established in reaction to the claimed fraud that happened during the presidential elections in 1970.

Armed peace period (1982-1985)

In 1984 the former president of Colombia Belisario Betancur signed a ceasefire with the FARC and M-19. This ceasefire only lasted for a year, even though the armed forces of the Colombian government tried to make it last longer. The FARC and M-19 ended the ceasefire in a different way, on different dates.

FARC getting stronger (1986-1999)

The FARC grew bigger and stronger and eventually became the biggest and best organised guerrilla movement of Latin-America. In 1986 there were almost 10,000 combatants that fought at almost 30 different locations. More than a decade later, in 1999, the FARC grew to almost 15,000 combatants at nearly 60 fronts. The FARC was active across Colombia, in nearly 40 percent of all the municipalities. The conflict didn't stay in Colombia itself, but became a cross-border conflict. One of the biggest 'enemies' outside of Colombia for the FARC were the United States.

Latest peace negotiations (2012–present)

In 2012 the president of Colombia, Juan Manuel Santos, and the leader of the FARC, Timoleon Jimenez (also called Timochencko) started peace negotiations in Havana. On the 26th of September 2016, the first peace agreement between the two groups was signed at a big ceremony in Cartagena. For the agreement to get ratified they held a referendum in October 2016. Even though they thought that they would win with 66 percent, the referendum was lost with 50,2 percent against and 49,8 percent pro the peace agreement. The negotiations continued and in November they signed the second agreement, ending a conflict that was going on for more than 52 years. A conflict that killed over a 220,000 people and displaced more than 7 million.

== See also ==
- Right-wing paramilitarism in Colombia
- Narcotrafficking in Colombia
- Red Terror (disambiguation)
