= Peasant Student Workers Movement =

The Peasant Student Workers Movement (in Spanish: Movimiento Obrero Estudiantil Campesino) was a leftist group in Colombia. MOEC was led by Fabio Vásquez Castano. MOEC took part in the formation of the ELN. Its power faded after its leader, student Antonio Larrota, was killed in May 1961.
