= Algeti Wolves =

Former Georgian paramilitary

The Algeti Wolves (Georgian: ალგეთის მგლები, algetis mglebi) was a paramilitary organization in Georgia who claimed responsibility for a series of small-scale guerilla attacks against Russian diplomats and military in Georgia in 1995. The name of the group comes from the Algeti river gorge in south-central Georgia, a place of Georgian resistance to Iranian invasion in the 17th century.

== History ==
The first attack for which the Agleti Wolves claimed credit occurred on April 9, 1995, on the 6th anniversary of the Soviet army crackdown on pro-independence rally in Tbilisi. The assailants detonated a small bomb in front of the residence of the Russian Ambassador to Georgia, Vladimir Zemsky, shattering windows and causing minor damage to nearby houses. No casualties were reported. The group also claimed responsibility for three consecutive attacks on the Russian military headquarters in Tbilisi in which a Georgian Defense Ministry soldier was killed. A message left near the site of the incident cited Russia's war in Chechnya as the reason for both attacks: “Six months have passed since the start of the Chechen war. This is the last warning; Get out of Georgia!”

The organization was too weak, however, and soon went in obscurity.
