= Guevarista Revolutionary Army =

Flag of the Guevarista Revolutionary Army

The Guevarista Revolutionary Army (Ejército Revolucionario Guevarista, ERG) was a revolutionary, guerrilla group operating in Colombia. It formed in 1992 as an offshoot of the ELN. It was named after and inspired by the Argentine Che Guevara.

Despite it being an offshoot of the ELN and employing tactics such as kidnapping, the ERG was not designated or watched as a terrorist organization by the United States, United Kingdom, the European Union, Australia, Canada or Russia, only by the Government of Colombia.

== Location ==
The ERG's membership was 45 persons in the day of their surrender. It did not operate nationwide and was considerably smaller than the two main guerrilla groups in Colombia, the Revolutionary Armed Forces of Colombia and the National Liberation Army. It was active in the Departments of Chocó, Risaralda, and Antioquia.

== Claimed attacks ==
In 1997, the group reportedly demanded $500,000 in ransom for six people the group kidnapped from a commercial helicopter in Antioquia. The helicopter was loaded with explosives, and the group reportedly placed mines in the location the people were taken. Three of the individuals kidnapped were recovered on July 30, unharmed, and the group released the helicopter to Colombian troops.

On July 27, 2000 (some sources claim the kidnapping occurred on July 25), ERG gunmen kidnapped a member of Doctors Without Borders. The hostage was a French aid worker, and it is unknown what happened to the hostage. After 88 days, the Doctors without Borders volunteer, Ignacio de Torquemada, was released from captivity. The doctor reported that most of his kidnappers were between 15 and 20 years old, In particular, he was quoted as calling them a bunch of “boys."

On August 21, 2001, Joseph Stocker, a Swedish engineer, was reportedly kidnapped by the ERG. Stocker was reportedly on vacation during the time the kidnapping took place. It occurred in the town of Carmen de Atrato.

In 2002, the former governor of Choco was reportedly kidnapped by the group.

On December 17, 2005, the group carried out a joint attack on Colombian police forces in the village of San Marino, with the two larger groups which killed at least six police officers. The group was known to operate mostly in Chocó.

On February 9, 2007, a Colombian National Army captain held hostage for three years by the group was freed.

== Notable members ==
Olimpo de Jesús Sánchez Caro-

Olimpo, known as El Viejo, as long as 19 members of the group demobilized in the city of Carmen Del Choco on August 21, 2008. Olimpo reportedly worked for multiple guerilla groups.

The group was formed by Olimpo de Jesús Sánchez Caro along with his brothers Ephraim Sánchez Carom and Lizardo Sánchez Caro.

The group started with 18 members on October 18, 1993, and eventually evolved to over 400 members.

Hector Albeidis Arboleda Buitrago, a nurse for multiple guerilla groups, was reportedly used to issue abortions.

== Trials and convictions ==
In December 2015, Sanchez Caro was charged with multiple crimes, including kidnappings, murder, forced abortions, and was sentenced to 20 years at the Itagui Prison in Antioquia. Also in December 2015, the Superior Court of Medellin convicted 20 members of the ERG with crimes ranging from, forced abortions, war crimes, illegal recruitment, and the murder of protected people. The government provided medical assistance to any women that needed it after the forced procedure, and offered education, training, and psychological help to those that sought it.

Hector Albedis Arboleda Buitrago was handed over to Colombian authorities after being extradited from Spain. Hector was accused of issuing forced abortions to female members.

== Demobilization ==
In 2008, Luis Carlos Restrepo Ramirez called for the group to demobilize. The announcement ensured that members who decided to demobilize and surrender their weapons would be subjected to the Justice and Peace Law. The Justice and Peace Law, signed in 2005 by President Uribe, the law issues reduced sentences for members and provides an easier route for fighters to rejoin civilian life. MAPP/OEA were responsible for monitoring the demobilization of the group. On August 21, 2008, the group laid down their arms and ceased to exist. The group surrendered 35 light weapons, 5,000 rounds of ammunition, and 20 explosives. The group was the first to surrender as a whole due to the Justice and Peace Law.
