= Bloque Meta =

Colombian drug trafficking and neo-paramilitary organization

Bloque Meta (English: Meta Block) was a Colombian drug trafficking, neo-paramilitary organization engaged in the Colombian armed conflict. Bloque Meta's history can be traced back to the United Self-Defense Forces of Colombia, or AUC. When the AUC demobilized in 2006, many former members of the organization formed ERPAC, which would later partly become the Bloque Meta, to continue the counterrevolutionary struggle against the FARC in Colombia's eastern plains. Above all, the Bloque Meta is considered one of Colombia's most brutal drug trafficking organizations. The group could have some 260 members in total. The last leader of the criminal group, Arnulfo Hernandez Guzman, also known as Tigre, was captured September 22, 2017, in Villavicencio (Meta). With this capture, according to statements by the Ministry of Defence, the organization is completely dismantled.

== Recent history ==
The Bloque Meta is believed to have been created by former members of the AUC who refused to demobilize together with the rest of the AUC coalition. These members formed ERPAC, which disintegrated in 2009, after which two factions arose; Bloque Meta and Libertadores del Vichada. These groups fight each other over the control of drug trafficking in the eastern Meta department. The leader of Bloque Meta, alias ‘Orozco’, claimed in a 2013 interview the struggle against Libertadores del Vichada was political and not about drug trafficking. After the capture of criminals known as El Loco Barrera and Jhonatan, in addition to the death of Pijarvey; the two blocs were in the hands of the drug trafficker Mauricio Pachón Rozo, also known as "Puntilla", reunited the two groups; This time with a new name: "Los Puntilleros", with base of operations in the Eastern Plains. The last leader of the Puntilleros, Arnulfo Hernandez Guzman, also known as Tigre, was captured September 22, 2017, in Villavicencio (Meta). With this capture, according to statements by the Ministry of Defence, the organization is completely dismantled.

== Modus operandi ==
The Bloque Meta uses AK-47 rifles, heavy machine-guns and light mortars.
