= La Guajira Cartel =

- Founding location: Maicao, Colombia
- Territory: Colombia: La Guajira and Cesar; Venezuela: Zulia
- Ethnicity: Colombian
- Activities: Drug trafficking, extortion, murder, money laundering, terrorism, robbery, kidnapping, and arms trafficking
- Allies: Cartel of the Suns
- Rivals: Clan del Golfo, Tren de Aragua

La Guajira Cartel (Spanish: Cartel de La Guajira) or Alianza Fronteriza refers to a criminal organization originating from Maicao that operates in the Guajira Peninsula on the Caribbean Sea, north of the border between Colombia and Venezuela. Its base territory is the city of Maracaibo and a large part of the state of Zulia in Venezuela, also covers La Guajira Department in Colombia; especially Maicao, and to the north of the Cesar Department, particularly, its capital Valledupar, thus matching the historical territory of the Wayuu indigenous ethnic group, to which some of its members belong. The cartel specializes in the control of contraband of all kinds of supplies; especially, Venezuelan gasoline to Colombia, weapons, minerals, stolen cars, cattle and drug trafficking. They also commit all kinds of robberies, extortion, assassination, threats, kidnappings, and usury.

== Activities ==
La Guajira Cartel processes the drug in the Colombian departments of Cesar, La Guajira and southern Bolívar, which is then transported to Venezuela passing through the states of Apure, Zulia, the region of the Paraguaná Peninsula in Falcón, Caracas, and then to the Isla de Margarita, where it is exported to other Caribbean islands such as the Dominican Republic and Haiti, bound for the United States and Europe.

Members of La Guajira Cartel have also carried out kidnappings for extortion. One of the gangs related to the cartel was accused of the kidnapping of the Spanish citizens María Concepción Marlaska and Ángel Sánchez Fernández, which took place on 17 May 2013.

== Relationship with the Cartel of the Suns ==
Clíver Alcalá Cordones married Marta González in 2012. González is a niece of the boss of the La Guajira Cartel, Hermágoras González, confined in El Helicoide. Alcalá was a general of the IV Armored Division and Garrison of Maracay, and was a military assistant to Hugo Chávez. The United States government has accused Alcalá of being a member of the Cartel of the Suns, led by Nicolás Maduro and his leadership, who lead the Chavista regime in Venezuela. According to the Colombian outlet Caracol Radio, the marriage between Alcalá and González would have meant an alliance between the La Guajira and Los Soles cartels. Alcalá broke ranks with the government in 2015 and, since then, has taken refuge in Barranquilla, Colombia. On 28 March 2020, Alcalá turned himself in to the DEA in Colombia, wanted in the United States for drug trafficking and money laundering in its federal courts.
