= Alianza Americana Anticomunista =

1970s Colombian paramilitary far-right group

American Anticommunist Alliance
- Alianza Americana Anticomunista
- Dates active: 1978–1979
- Ideology: Anti-communism
- Political position: Far-right
- Status: Inactive

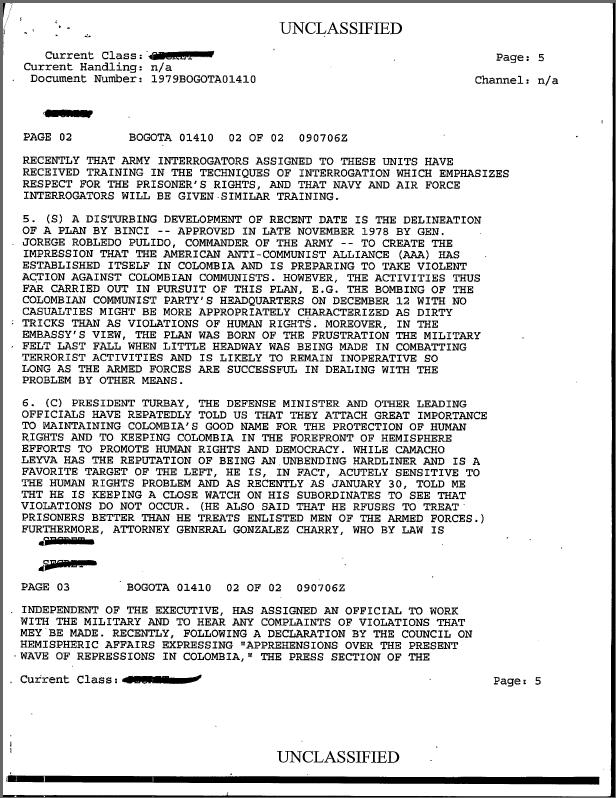
US Embassy document detailing the formation of the AAA under the BINCI of the Colombian National Army

The Alianza Americana Anticomunista (AAA, pronounced triple-A; "American Anticommunist Alliance") was a paramilitary far-right group mainly operating in Colombia between 1978 and 1979.

Contemporary accusations and declassified U.S. Embassy documents have linked the creation and operation of this group to members of a Colombian National Army battalion employing the Triple A name as a label.

== Foundation ==
A 1979 report from the United States Embassy in Bogotá, Colombia details that then-General Jorge Robledo Pulido and members of the "Charry Solano" Battalion of Intelligence and Counterintelligence (BINCI) were directly involved in the creation of AAA. The report describes a plan intended "to create the impression that the American Anti-communist Alliance has established itself in Colombia and is preparing to take violent action against local communists."

== Accusations and activities ==
In December 1978, the Anticommunist American Alliance bombed the Colombian Communist Party Headquarters, and later the Communist Party's newspaper Voz Proletaria. The bombing of the Communist Party HQ left no casualties according to the 1979 U.S. Embassy's report, which describes Triple A's contemporary activities as "more appropriately characterized as dirty tricks" than human rights abuses.

BINCI has been accused of participating in a number of other bombings, kidnappings and assassinations against leftists and abuses of guerrilla detainees between the years of 1978 and 1979. In an open letter published on November 29, 1980, by the Mexican newspaper El Día, five individuals identified as former Colombian military detail a number of activities carried out by BINCI personnel operating as Triple A. Among those implicated in the operations of Triple A are then-Lieutenant Mario Montoya Uribe, who would have participated in the bombing of Voz Proletaria, and then-Lieutenant Colonel Harold Bedoya, the commander of BINCI who would have given orders to several of the personnel involved.

A 1992 publication, El Terrorismo de Estado en Colombia (State Terrorism in Colombia), prepared by a coalition of human rights groups that included Catholic peace movement Pax Christi International, repeated the accusations found in the El Día article.

=== U.S. evaluation ===
In 1999, the Defence Intelligence Agency (DIA) concluded that there was no evidence to support the accusations regarding General Mario Montoya Uribe's involvement in Triple A, citing the information as "a NGO smear campaign dating back 20 years". This denial took place before the National Security Archive's request and subsequent declassification of the 1979 Embassy document.

== See also ==
- Colombian conflict
- Colombian Ministry of Defense
- History of Colombia
- Military of Colombia
- Paramilitarism in Colombia
- Politics of Colombia
