= BINCI =

Colombian military intelligence unit

The Batallón Único de Inteligencia y Contrainteligencia (English: Battalion of Intelligence and Counterintelligence) is a unit of the Colombian National Army. The BINCI has also been referred to as the "Charry Solano battalion," after its original chief, Brigadier General Ricardo Charry Solano.

It has also been known as the Twentieth Brigade or Brigade XX.

== Controversy ==
=== Triple A ===
During the years of its operation, the BINCI was considered the Colombian National Army's primary counter-intelligence unit and under direct operational control of the E-2 Army intelligence directorate in Bogotá, Colombia.

A declassified 1979 report from the United States Embassy in Bogotá, published in 2007 by the National Security Archive, mentioned that there was a plan for the BINCI to form a paramilitary operation under the guise of the Alianza Americana Anticomunista (AAA). The report describes the goal of the formation of the AAA as "to create the impression that the American Anti-communist Alliance has established itself in Colombia and is preparing to take violent action against local communists." The BINCI, acting as the AAA, has been linked to the December 1978 bombing of the Colombian Communist Party Headquarters, the bombing of the Communist Party newspaper Voz Proletaria. It has also been accused of engaging in other kidnappings, bombings and assassinations against leftist targets and guerrilla detainees.

=== Forced Disappearance ===
On August 30, 1987, Nydia Erika Bautista de Arellana was kidnapped by a group of undercover operatives identified as part of Brigade XX. Nydia Erika was 30 years old and had previously been detained due to her student activism and membership in the Movimiento 19 de Abril (English: 19th of April Movement) (M-19) guerrilla group. On September 12, 1987, her body was found, showing signs that she had been shot once in the head execution style. On July 9, 1995, Colombia's Procurator-Delegate for Human Rights, Hernando Valencia Villa, announced the conclusions of a disciplinary investigation into the 1987 "disappearance", torture and murder of Nydia Erika Bautista and called for Brigadier General Álvaro Hernán Velandia Hurtado and an army sergeant to be expelled from the armed forces. It was found that the then commander of Brigade XX for which the "Charry Solano" Army Battalion was attached, was fully aware of the capture, disappearance, torture and murder of Nydia Erika Bautista by men under his command and that he had had the "duty, power and opportunity to prevent this serious crime from being committed".

=== Assaults ===
On February 27, 1998, the BINCI was implicated by Colombian government investigators in the murders of human rights workers; lawyer Jesús María Valle, president of the "Héctor Abad Gómez" Permanent Committee for Human Rights in Antioquia and human rights lawyer Eduardo Umaña. In May 1998 the Twentieth Brigade assaulted the offices of Justicia y Paz (English: Justice and Peace) where they were reported to have ransacked the offices and forced nuns and human rights workers to their knees and placed guns to their heads.

On May 19, 1998, the BINCI was disbanded pending a reorganization, in part due to their participation in human rights abuses.

== See also ==
- History of Colombia
- Kidnappings in Colombia
- Military of Colombia
- Paramilitarism in Colombia
- Politics of Colombia
