= Libertadores del Vichada =

Colombian drug trafficking neo-paramilitary group

Libertadores del Vichada (English: The Liberators of Vichada), was a Colombian drug trafficking neo-paramilitary group involved in the Colombian armed conflict. It is considered to be one of the most important drug trafficking organizations in eastern Colombia. The group was led by Martín Farfán Díaz González, alias 'Pijarbey,' a former leader of the neo-paramilitary group ERPAC. According to Colombia's prosecutor general, Díaz González is responsible for several homicides and acts of terrorism against the civilian population. The last leader of the criminal group was captured September 22, 2017, in Villavicencio (Meta). With this capture, according to statements by the Ministry of Defence, the organization is completely dismantled.

== Background ==
The origins of Libertadores del Vichada can be traced back to the disintegration of ERPAC, an armed, paramilitary group that was partially demobilized in 2009. However, only 300 out of roughly 900 ERPAC members surrendered to Colombian authorities, and the remaining 600 were believed to have joined Libertadores de Vichada or the rivalling Meta Block. After the capture of criminals known as El Loco Barrera and Jhonatan, in addition to the death of Pijarvey; the two blocs were in the hands of the drug trafficker Mauricio Pachón Rozo, also known as "Puntilla", reunited the two groups; This time with a new name: "Los Puntilleros", with base of operations in the Eastern Plains. The last leader of the Puntilleros, Arnulfo Hernandez Guzman, also known as Tigre, was captured September 22, 2017, in Villavicencio (Meta). With this capture, according to statements by the Ministry of Defence, the organization is completely dismantled.

== Modus operandi ==
Los Libertadores del Vichada use AK-47 rifles and other small arms and have a hierarchical, military structure inherited from the AUC. The members use military uniforms stolen from the Colombian army.

== Conflict with the FARC ==
Los Libertadores del Vichada have frequently fought battles against the FARC rebel group in eastern Colombia.
