= Right-wing paramilitarism in Colombia =

Right-wing paramilitary groups in Colombia (Spanish: paramilitares de derecha) are paramilitary groups acting in opposition to revolutionary Marxist–Leninist guerrilla forces and their allies among the civilian population. These right-wing paramilitary groups control a large majority of the illegal drug trade in Colombia of cocaine and other substances. The Colombian National Centre for Historical Memory has estimated that between 1981 and 2012, paramilitary groups have caused 38.4% of the civilian deaths, which includes massacres, such as the Mapiripán massacre, while the Guerillas are responsible for 16.8%, 10.1% by the Colombian Security Forces and 27.7% by unidentified armed groups.

The first paramilitary groups were organized by the Colombian military following recommendations made by U.S. military counterinsurgency advisers who were sent to Colombia during the Cold War to combat leftist political activists and armed guerrilla groups. The development of more modern paramilitary groups has also involved elite landowners, drug traffickers, members of the security forces, politicians, civilians, and multinational corporations, as well as training from foreign governments such as Israel. Paramilitary violence today is principally targeted towards supposed left-wing insurgents and their supporters.

== History ==
=== Plan Lazo ===
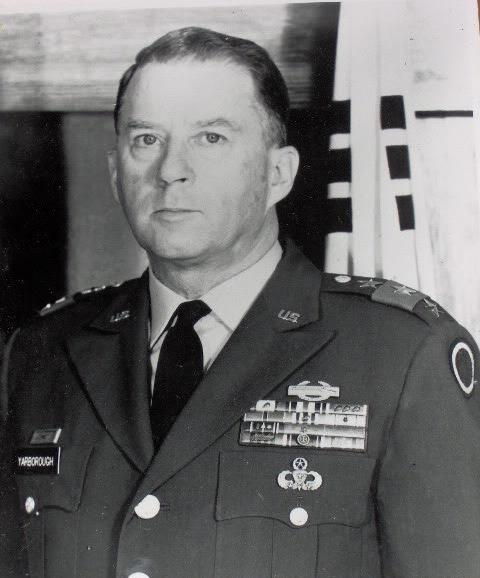
US General William P. Yarborough was the head of a counterinsurgency team sent to Colombia in 1962 by the US Special Warfare Center. Yarborough was one of the earliest proponents of "paramilitary ... and/or terrorist activities against known communist proponents".

In October 1959, the United States sent a "Special Survey Team", composed of counterinsurgency experts, to investigate Colombia's internal security situation. This was due to the increased prevalence of armed communist groups in rural Colombia which formed during and after La Violencia. In February 1962, a Fort Bragg top-level U.S. Special Warfare team, headed by Special Warfare Center commander General William P. Yarborough, visited Colombia for a second survey.

In a secret supplement to his report to the Joint Chiefs of Staff, Yarborough encouraged the creation and deployment of a paramilitary force to commit sabotage and terrorist acts against communists:

A concerted country team effort should be made now to select civilian and military personnel for clandestine training in resistance operations in case they are needed later. This should be done with a view toward development of a civil and military structure for exploitation in the event the Colombian internal security system deteriorates further. This structure should be used to pressure toward reforms known to be needed, perform counter-agent and counter-propaganda functions and as necessary execute paramilitary, sabotage and/or terrorist activities against known communist proponents. It should be backed by the United States."

The new counter-insurgency policy was instituted as Plan Lazo in 1962 and called for both military operations and civic action programs in violent areas. Following Yarborough's recommendations, the Colombian military recruited civilians into paramilitary "civil defense" groups which worked alongside the military in its counter-insurgency campaign, as well as in civilian intelligence networks to gather information on guerrilla activity. Among other policy recommendations, the US team advised that "in order to shield the interests of both Colombian and US authorities against 'interventionist' charges any special aid given for internal security was to be sterile and covert in nature." It was not until the early part of the 1980s that the Colombian government attempted to move away from the counterinsurgency strategy represented by Plan Lazo and Yarborough's 1962 recommendations.

=== Law 48 of 1968 ===
The first legal framework for the training of civilians by military or police forces for security purposes was formally established by the Colombian presidential decree 3398 of 1965, issued during a state of siege, which defined the defense of the nation as requiring "the organization and tasking of all of the residents of the country and its natural resources...to guarantee National Independence and institutional stability." This decree temporarily allowed the formation of private security forces used to protect large landowners, cattle ranchers, and government officials.

Decree 3398 was later succeeded by Law 48 of 1968, a piece of permanent legislation that gave the Colombian executive the power to establish civil patrols by decree and allowed the Defense Ministry to supply their members with military-grade weaponry. Human Rights Watch has pointed out that "although few civil patrols were ever formally created by the president, the military frequently cited Law 48 as the legal foundation for their support for all paramilitaries."

A series of Colombian military manuals from the 1960s encouraged the creation of paramilitary organizations to help fight guerrillas. In 1969, the Reglamento de EJC 3-10, Reservado, de 1969 ("EJC-3 Order, Restricted, 1969") stated that the armed forces should organize "self-defense committees" which were defined as "military-type organizations made up of civilian personnel in the combat zone, which are trained and equipped to undertake operations against guerrilla groups that threaten an area or to operate in coordination with combat troops". These committees were to maintain contact with local military officers, keeping a high level awareness about any suspicious communist action in their communities, in particular those of suspected "guerrilla supporters". The manual also allowed military personnel to dress in civilian clothes when necessary to infiltrate areas of suspected guerrilla influence and for civilian helpers to travel alongside military units. Separately, in order to help gain the trust of local citizens, the military was advised to participate in the daily activities of the community where and when applicable.

=== Triple A ===
Between 1978 and 1979, a far-right paramilitary organization known as the American Anti-Communist Alliance (also AAA or Triple A) started a terror campaign against Colombian communists, which included bombings, kidnappings and assassinations. It was later revealed that the organization had direct links to the Colombian National Army. Contemporary accusations and declassified U.S. Embassy documents have linked the creation and operation to the "Charry Solano" Battalion of Intelligence and Counter-intelligence (BINCI) that employed the Triple A name as a covert name.

=== Rise of paramilitaries ===
"That they try to present me as an associate of the guerrilla ... hurts my personal dignity ... I am a man of investments and therefore I cannot sympathize with the guerrillas who fight against property."

— Pablo Escobar, head of the Medellin Cartel

In the late 1970s, the illegal cocaine trade took off and became a major source of profit. By 1982, cocaine surpassed coffee as a national export, making up 30% of all Colombian exports. Many members of the new class of wealthy drug barons began purchasing enormous quantities of land for a number of reasons: in order to launder their drug money and to gain social status among the traditional Colombian elite. By the late 1980s, drug traffickers were the largest landholders in Colombia and wielded immense political power. They raised private armies to fight off guerrillas who were trying to either redistribute their lands to local peasants, kidnap members of their family, or extract the gramaje tax that was commonly levied on landed elites.

==== Muerte a Secuestradores (MAS) ====
Between the end of 1981 and the beginning of 1982, members of the Medellín Cartel, the Colombian military, the U.S.-based corporation Texas Petroleum, the Colombian legislature, small industrialists, and wealthy cattle ranchers came together in a series of meetings in Puerto Boyacá, and formed a paramilitary organization known as Muerte a Secuestradores ("Death to Kidnappers", MAS). They formed this organization to defend their economic interests, to fight against the guerrillas, and to provide protection for local elites from kidnappings and extortion. By 1983, Colombian internal affairs had registered 240 political killings by MAS death squads—mostly community leaders, elected officials, and farmers.

==== Asociación Campesina de Ganaderos y Agricultores del Magdalena Medio (ACDEGAM) ====
The following year, the Asociación Campesina de Ganaderos y Agricultores del Magdalena Medio ("Association of Middle Magdalena Ranchers and Farmers", ACDEGAM) was created to handle both the logistics and the public relations of the organization and to provide a legal front for various paramilitary groups. ACDEGAM worked to promote anti-labor policies and threatened anyone involved with organizing for labor or peasants' rights. The threats were backed by the MAS, which would come in and attack or assassinate anyone who was suspected of being a "subversive". ACDEGAM also built schools whose stated purpose was the creation of a "patriotic and anti-Communist" educational environment, built roads, bridges, and health clinics. Paramilitary recruiting, weapons storage, communications, propaganda, and medical services were all run out of ACDEGAM headquarters.

By the mid-1980s, ACDEGAM and MAS had experienced significant growth. In 1985, the powerful drug traffickers Pablo Escobar, Jorge Luis Ochoa, and Gonzalo Rodríguez Gacha began funneling large amounts of cash into the organization to pay for weaponry, equipment and training. Funding for social projects was cut and put towards strengthening the MAS. Modern battle rifles such as the IMI Galil, HK G3, FN FAL, and AKM were purchased from the military and INDUMIL through drug-funded private sales. The organization had computers and ran a communications center that worked in coordination with the state telecommunications office. They had thirty pilots and an assortment of helicopters and fixed-wing aircraft. U.S., Israeli, British and Australian military instructors were hired to teach at paramilitary training centers. According to the report by the Departamento Administrativo de Seguridad ("DAS", Colombia's Administrative Security Department), between December 1987 and May 1988, Rodríguez Gacha hired Israeli and British mercenaries to train teams of assassins at remote training camps in Colombia. Yair Klein, a retired Israeli lieutenant colonel, acknowledged having led a team of instructors in Puerto Boyacá in early 1988.

==== Movimiento de Restauración Nacional (MORENA) ====
By the end of the 1980s, the MAS had a significant presence in 8 of Colombia's 32 departments—Antioquia, Boyacá, Caquetá, Córdoba, Cundinamarca, Meta, Putumayo, and Santander. During this period, a stated goal of the groups was to kill members of the Patriotic Union or any political groups that opposed drug trafficking. At the same time, they began to intensively involve themselves in municipal, regional, and national politics. In August 1989, the Movimiento de Restauración Nacional ("Movement of National Restoration", MORENA) was formed by members of ACDEGAM.

Critics of the MORENA experiment either saw it as an attempt at legitimizing paramilitarism and its abuses, as an extension of ACDEGAM, or as a copycat of El Salvador's ARENA.

=== Castaño family and ACCU ===
In the late 1970s, the FARC-EP began gathering intelligence on Don Jesús Castaño. A wealthy rancher in Segovia, Antioquia, far-right conservative, and influential local politician, Don Jesús was considered an ideal target for kidnapping. The Don was kidnapped in 1981, and ultimately died while in captivity.

Don Jesús had several sons. The oldest of these, Fidel, had accumulated a fortune illegally smuggling emeralds, robbing, and trafficking cocaine and marijuana. By the 1980s, Fidel had become one of the most powerful mafia capos in the world, and had purchased large tracts of lands in northern Colombia. By 1988, he and his younger brother Carlos purchased over 1.2 million hectares of land in Antioquia, Córdoba, and Chocó.

As a teenager, Carlos Castaño had worked as an informant for the Colombian army's Bomboná battalion, which had strong links to MAS death squads. He later worked as an assassin for the MAS, and was supplied with weapons by army officers. In 1983, Carlos went to Tel Aviv, Israel where he spent a year taking courses in paramilitary and counterinsurgency tactics.

==== Los Tangueros ====
While Carlos was in Israel, Fidel hired a group of over 100 armed men, which began to terrorize the local populace. The thugs became known as Los Tangueros by the villagers after the name of the Castaño ranch, Las Tangas, where they were based. In 1983, under orders from Fidel, a group of men went through the villages near Segovia, where his father had been held, and killed every man, woman, and child living on the river nearby. They pulled babies out of their mothers arms and shot them, nailing one baby to a plank. They impaled a man on a bamboo pole, and hacked a woman to pieces with a machete. By the time they were done, 22 people were dead.

By the late 1980s, numerous cattle ranchers in Córdoba were now supporting Fidel Castaño. Many of them had been forced to pay increasing amounts of extortion money to the EPL and other Communist guerrillas under the threat of kidnapping or having their ranches burned and their animals killed. Widespread local mobilizations against the central government's peace initiatives, the guerrillas, and political movements thought to have their consent or approval, were organized under the leadership of the Colombian military and Fidel's group. Between 1988 and 1990, Colombian press sources reported almost 200 political murders and 400 suspected political assassinations in the region and official government figures suggested that a total of 1,200 of them took place in Córdoba during the period. Left-wing politicians received anonymous death threats and were frequently interrogated in army bases by the 11th Brigade.

==== Foundation for the Peace of Córdoba ====
In 1990, Fidel Castaño offered to disband his paramilitary forces if the EPL agreed to demobilize. Having previously faced the combined pressure of Los Tangueros and the Colombian military, the guerrillas demobilized over 2,000 illegal combatants and founded the Hope, Peace, and Liberty party. Fidel surrendered some weapons to government authorities and created the Fundación por la Paz de Córdoba (Foundation for the Peace of Córdoba) which provided money, land, cattle and other support to hundreds of former EPL combatants. Electoral alliances between the new party, the AD/M19, and local right-wing politicians were established.

After the demobilization, the Communist FARC-EP expanded its activities in Córdoba and clashes between them, a dissident EPL faction, and the demobilized guerrillas—some of which formed armed "popular commands"—led to almost 200 murders of former fighters and continued violence. Carlos Castaño claimed that this was the reason he decided to reactivate his family's private army.

==== Autodefensas Campesinas de Córdoba y Uraba (ACCU) ====
In 1994, Carlos took control of Los Tangueros, which officially changed their name to the Autodefensas Campesinas de Córdoba y Uraba ("Peasant Self-Defense Forces of Córdoba and Urabá", ACCU). The ACCU began working with regional military forces, such as the Bomboná battalion, to crush the guerrillas, and murder or intimidate anyone suspected of supporting them. The ACCU helped military commanders by providing intelligence regarding local guerrilla activities. The ACCU began networking with other paramilitary groups such as the MAS, and began to take over large areas of northern Colombia, which was the principal transnational shipping point for illegal drugs.

=== Anti-Paramilitary Decrees of 1989 ===
In 1987, government statistics revealed that paramilitaries had been responsible for more civilian deaths than guerrillas deaths. Two years later, in 1989, the Colombian government under the administration of Virgilio Barco (1986–1990), passed a series of decrees that promised to reduce paramilitary violence.

The first of the decrees, Decree 813, called for the creation of a commission to oversee the government's anti-paramilitary efforts. The commission was to include the Ministers of Government, Justice, and National Defense, along with the chiefs of the Army, National Police, and DAS. The commission was supposed to plan ways to cut down on paramilitary violence and oversee the execution of these plans. However, most of the people in the commission had either openly voiced support for the paramilitaries or headed agencies with very strong ties to paramilitary groups, and the commission rarely met over the following decade.

The second decree, Decree 814, established a 1,000 member anti-paramilitary police force that was made up of active-duty officers from the National Police. The police force was mostly assigned to raiding drug laboratories and the offices of drug trafficking organizations, rather than confronting the paramilitaries directly.

The third decree, Decree 815, suspended the Armed Forces's privilege to distribute weapons to armed civilian groups (a power which had been granted under Law 48 in 1968), and required any new armed civilian groups to be approved by the President and Ministers of Defense and Government. However, the government did not outlaw the already existing paramilitary groups or require that they be re-certified through the more stringent new standards.

In 1989, the administration issued Decree 1194 which outlawed "the armed groups, misnamed paramilitary groups, that have been formed into death squads, bands of hired assassins, self-defense groups, or groups that carry out their own justice" after the murder of two judges and ten government investigators at La Rochela, Santander. The decree established criminal penalties for both civilians and members of the armed forces involved in the promotion, financing, training and membership of said groups.

=== Armed Forces Directive No. 200-05/91 ===
In 1990, the United States formed a team that included representatives of the U.S. Embassy's Military Group, U.S. Southern Command, the Defence Intelligence Agency (DIA), and the Central Intelligence Agency (CIA) in order to give advice on the reshaping of several of the Colombian military's local intelligence networks, ostensibly to aid the Colombian military in counter-narcotics efforts. Advice was also solicited from the British and Israeli military intelligence, but the U.S. proposals were ultimately selected by the Colombian military.

The result of these meetings was Armed Forces Directive 200-05/91, issued by the Colombian Defense Ministry in May 1991. The order itself made no mention of drugs or counter-narcotics operations at all, but instead focused exclusively on creating covert intelligence networks to combat the insurgency.

==== Controversy surrounding directive ====
Human Rights Watch (HRW) concluded that these intelligence networks subsequently laid the groundwork for continuing an illegal, covert partnership between the military and paramilitaries. HRW argued that the restructuring process solidified linkages between members of the Colombian military and civilian members of paramilitary groups, by incorporating them into several of the local intelligence networks and by cooperating with their activities. In effect, HRW believed that this further consolidated a "secret network that relied on paramilitaries not only for intelligence, but to carry out murder".

HRW argued that this situation allowed the Colombian government and military to plausibly deny links or responsibility for paramilitary human rights abuses. HRW stated that the military intelligence networks created by the U.S. reorganization appeared to have dramatically increased violence, stating that the "recommendations were given despite the fact that some of the U.S. officials who collaborated with the team knew of the Colombian military's record of human rights abuses and its ongoing relations with paramilitaries".

HRW stated that while "not all paramilitaries are intimate partners with the military", the existing partnership between paramilitaries and the Colombian military was "a sophisticated mechanism--in part supported by years of advice, training, weaponry, and official silence by the United States--that allows the Colombian military to fight a dirty war and Colombian officialdom to deny it."

As an example of increased violence and "dirty war" tactics, HRW cited a partnership between the Colombian Navy and the MAS, in Barrancabermeja where: "In partnership with MAS, the navy intelligence network set up in Barrancabermeja adopted as its goal not only the elimination of anyone perceived as supporting the guerrillas, but also members of the political opposition, journalists, trade unionists, and human rights workers, particularly if they investigated or criticized their terror tactics."

=== Perseguidos Por Pablo Escobar (Los Pepes) ===
Man killed in Medellín by Los Pepes

In 1992 Pablo Escobar escaped from his luxury prison, La Catedral. Shortly after, the Calí Cartel, dissidents within the Medellín Cartel, and the MAS worked together to create a new paramilitary organization known as Perseguidos Por Pablo Escobar ("People Persecuted by Pablo Escobar", Los Pepes) with the purpose of tracking down and killing Pablo Escobar and his associates. The organization was led by Fidel Castaño. The Calí Cartel provided $50 million to pay for weapons, informants, and assassins, with the hopes that they could wipe out their primary rival in the cocaine business. Members of both Colombian and U.S. government agencies (including the DEA, CIA and State Department) provided intelligence to Los Pepes.

Pablo Escobar complained about how the government targeted the Medellín Cartel, but did not go after paramilitaries or members of the Calí Cartel, saying:

Los Pepes have their torture chambers in Fidel Castaño's house [in Medellín], located ... near the country club ... There they torture trade unionists and lawyers. No one has searched their house or confiscated their assets ... The government offers rewards for the leaders of the Medellín Cartel and for the leaders of the guerrillas, but doesn't offer rewards for the leaders of the paramilitaries, nor for those of the Calí Cartel, authors of various car bombs in the city of Medellín.

=== Servicios Especiales De Vigilancia y Seguridad Privada (CONVIVIR) ===
During the 1990s, the FARC-EP and other guerrilla groups experienced significant growth and achieved a series of military successes against government forces, increasing the amount of territory under their control. The administration of President Ernesto Samper (1994–1998) carried out ineffective operations against the insurgency and attempted to enter into peace negotiations. Colombian military commanders resisted Samper's offer of a demilitarized zone in La Uribe, Meta Department meant to hold these talks. The FARC-EP leadership expressed initial interest in the administration's plan, but ultimately refused to accept any preconditions. The Samper administration was also seriously undermined it in the eyes of the guerillas after the scandal concerning the receipt of over $6 million in campaign from the Cali Cartel.

In 1994, Decree 356 of Colombia's Ministry of Defense authorized the creation of legal paramilitary groups known as Servicios Especiales De Vigilancia y Seguridad Privada ("Special vigilance and private security services"), also known as CONVIVIR groups. The CONVIVIR groups were intended to maintain control over high risk areas where guerrillas did not have a strong presence after having been expelled and where there was no need for a large military force or illegal paramilitary presence anymore. Many illegal paramilitary groups transitioned into legal CONVIVIR groups after this. These CONVIVIR groups worked alongside both the Colombian military and illegal paramilitary groups in counterinsurgency operations.

The governor of Antioquia, Álvaro Uribe Vélez—who would later become President of Colombia—was one of the primary proponents of the CONVIVIR program. Statistics regarding the exact number of CONVIVIR groups differ and have been considered hard to obtain. Estimates indicate that, by the late 1990s, from 414 to over 500 of these groups had been created, with their membership ranging from 10,000 to 120,000. Uribe's department of Antioquia had some 65 CONVIVIR groups, one of the highest figures in the country.

Amnesty International claims that the CONVIVIR groups committed numerous human rights abuses against civilians, working in coordination with the Colombian government and paramilitaries. In 1998, Human Rights Watch stated that "we have received credible information that indicated that the CONVIVIR groups of the Middle Magdalena and of the southern Cesar regions were directed by known paramilitaries and had threatened to assassinate Colombians that were considered as guerrilla sympathizers or which rejected joining the cooperative groups".

In November 1997, due to mounting concerns over human rights violations committed by CONVIVIR groups and the relations between illegal paramilitaries and CONVIVIR, the Constitutional Court of Colombia stated that the issue of military weaponry to civilians and specifically to CONVIVIR groups was unconstitutional, and that CONVIVIR members could no longer be used to gather intelligence information. Many of the CONVIVIR groups simply joined up with the Autodefensas Unidas de Colombia (AUC).

By the end of the decade, there had been a tenfold increase in the number of Colombian paramilitaries.

== Autodefensas Unidas de Colombia (AUC) ==
In April 1997, the creation of the Autodefensas Unidas de Colombia (United Self-Defense Forces of Colombia) or AUC was announced, formally inaugurating what has been termed by analysts as the "second generation" of paramilitarism. It is considered to be the result of Carlos Castaño's efforts to achieve a measure of unity between most of the other paramilitary forces in the country. Several paramilitary groups did not join, but the AUC itself claimed to represent about 90% of existing forces at the time. Castaño's ACCU formally became the core of the new umbrella organization, while the other heads of paramilitary groups kept their own leadership positions, becoming part of a federated High Command of the AUC. It has been considered by observers that the FARC's advances as part of a 1996 to 1998 offensive eased the process of this formal paramilitary unification. As a response, the AUC engaged in a renewed series of massacres and assassinations, often with the passive or active aid of elements of the Colombian government's security forces, according to human rights organizations.

=== 2003–2006 demobilization process ===
In July 2003, the Uribe administration began formal negotiations with the AUC with the stated aim of seeking its demobilization. Law 975 of 2005, also known as the "Justice and Peace" law, was approved by the Colombian Congress and constituted the main legal framework applicable to those paramilitaries who had committed serious crimes. The legislation gave AUC combatants broad concessions, such as allowing paramilitaries to keep profits made from criminal activities during their time in the AUC, limiting sentences to a maximum of 8 years which could be served on private farms instead of in prisons, and not obliging them to dismantle their power structures.

Under the Colombian government's interpretation of Law 782 of 2002 and Decree 128 of 2003, the majority of the paramilitaries who submitted to the process were pardoned through the cessation of judicial procedures for charges related to their membership in the group. Only 3,700 of the paramilitaries applied for "Justice and Peace" benefits.

The demobilization process was heavily criticized by national and international human rights organizations as well as by international entities, such as the Office of the UN High Commissioner for Human Rights and the Inter-American Commission on Human Rights (IACHR) of the OAS, citing its non-compliance with international standards on the rights of victims to seek justice and reparation and granting impunity to human rights violators. Colombian congresswoman Gina Parody claimed that Law 975 gave "benefits to people who have committed the worst crimes"

On May 18, 2006, the Constitutional Court of Colombia reviewed Law 975 of 2005, modifying and striking down several of its original articles and correcting some of the problems critics had identified. The revision requires full confessions, turning over illegally acquired assets, provides that reduced sentences may be revoked for lying and removes time limits on investigations. The Court also ruled against the option for paramilitaries to serve their sentences outside of prison or to deduct time spent during negotiations.

In 2007 and 2008, paramilitary commanders provided useful information to prosecutors about their activities and associates. However, of some 1,800 individuals who began confessing their crimes to prosecutors in 2005, just 5 had completed their hearings by 2009. A limited number of assets worth an estimated US$5 million had been surrendered to the official reparations fund, but procedures for the return of stolen land to its original owners remained stagnant and paramilitary leaders extradited to the United States mostly ceased collaborations with authorities.

Serious flaws during the demobilization phase, such as the Colombian government's failure to interrogate and verify the identities of those involved in the process, allowed many paramilitaries to remain active, form new successor groups, and continue to engage in human rights violations.

In September 2006, Amnesty International said:

Media reports suggest that over 30,000 paramilitaries have demobilized. However, paramilitaries in supposedly demobilized areas continue to operate, often under new names, and to commit violations. There is also strong evidence of continued links between paramilitaries and the security forces. There were also fears that government policies designed to reintegrate members of illegal armed groups into civilian life risked "recycling" them into the conflict.

In February 2010, Human Rights Watch said:

The successor groups, though different in important respects from the paramilitary United Self-Defense Forces of Colombia ... have taken on many of the same roles, often with some of the same personnel, in some cases with the same counterinsurgency objectives of the AUC ... It is clear that many paramilitary combatants did in fact go through the demobilization process and abandoned their groups for good. However, there is substantial evidence that many others who participated in the demobilization process were stand-ins rather than paramilitaries, and that portions of the groups remained active. There is also evidence that members of the groups who supposedly demobilized continued engaging in illegal activities.

A 2010 United Nations report stated:

The vast majority of paramilitaries responsible for human rights violations were demobilized without investigation, and many were effectively granted amnesties. Today, the failure in accountability is clear from the dramatic rise in killings by illegal armed groups composed largely of former paramilitaries.

A December 2014 International Crisis Group report stated:

...Demobilisation remained partial, as some stayed outside the process or went on to rearm, strongly contributing to the emergence of successor groups known as New Illegal Armed Groups (NAIGs). Their number has fallen from 32 in 2006 to three, but they still muster some 3,000 members often concentrated in regions with a strong paramilitary legacy such as Uraba, the Eastern Plains, the south-western departments or the Caribbean coast.

=== Reintegration of ex-paramilitary fighters ===
Since 2006, the Office of the High Counselor for Reintegration (ACR) has been in charge of the reintegration policy for demobilized AUC members. The ACR assists ex-combatants with education, vocational training, grants for micro-businesses, psychosocial support, healthcare and a monthly stipend dependent on the ex-combatants’ participation to reintegration activities. Of the 31,671 demobilized members of the AUC, 20,267 were actively participating in the reintegration program by the end of 2009. The others were either involved in the process of Justice and Peace, imprisoned due to infractions after their demobilization, dead, or had left the program for unknown reasons.

== Post-AUC successor criminal groups ==
New paramilitary groups and related drug trafficking gangs that have continued operating after the AUC demobilization process are referred to as bandas criminales (BACRIM) or criminal gangs by the Colombian government. According to the Colombian National Police, these groups had 3,749 members by July 2010, while the NGO Instituto de Estudios para el Desarrollo y la Paz estimated 6,000 active combatants.. Others estimate their ranks may include up to 10,000 people.

Until 2011 Colombia remained the world's largest cocaine producer, and since 2003, Human Rights Watch stated that according to their Colombian intelligence sources, "40 percent of the country's total cocaine exports" were controlled by these paramilitaries. In 2011 an independent investigation, made by the Colombian newspaper El Tiempo, estimated that 50% of all Colombian cocaine was controlled by the same BACRIM groups.

In the early 2010s, the Black Eagles, Los Rastrojos, Los Urabeños, Los Paisas, Los Machos, Renacer, Los Gaitanistas, Nueva Generación, Bloque Meta, Libertadores del Vichada, the ERPAC, and The Office of Envigado comprised the dominant criminal and paramilitary organizations.

There were originally over 30 BACRIM, but by late 2017, the number had been reduced to a handful as smaller groups have been absorbed by more powerful networks or dismantled by the security forces, leaving only Los Urabeños with a national presence.

These successor groups are often made up of mid-level paramilitary commanders and criminal structures that either did not demobilize in the first place or were re-activated after the demobilizations had concluded. Many demobilized paramilitaries received recruitment offers, were threatened into joining the new organizations, or have simultaneously rearmed and remained in government reintegration programs. New recruits have also come from traditional areas for paramilitary recruitment.

BACRIMs continue to be involved in the drug trade, commit widespread human rights abuses, engage in forced displacement, and undermine democratic legitimacy in other ways—both in collusion with and opposition to FARC-EP guerrillas. Their targets have included human rights defenders, labor unionists and victims of the former AUC. Members of government security forces have also been accused of tolerating their growth.

== Human rights violations ==
The right-wing paramilitaries have been blamed for many of the human rights violations during the Colombian conflict, particularly killings of civilians. In 2022, the Truth Commission for Colombia concluded that paramilitaries were responsible for 45% of all killings and 52% of forced disappearances. During some years of the conflict, the paramilitaries and state agents were responsible for approximately 73 to 85% of all political murders in Colombia. Many of these killings occur in massacres in rural areas, with the paramilitaries claiming they are eliminating alleged supporters of the guerrilla movements. Paramilitaries also engage in the use of child soldiers and sexual violence against civilians, along with kidnappings for extortion purposes.

"[The AUC] mutilated bodies with chainsaws. They chained people to burning vehicles. They decapitated and rolled heads like soccer balls. They killed dozens at one time, including women and children. They buried people alive or hung them on meat hooks, carving them ... the victims ... were civilians accused of supporting the guerrillas by supplying them with food, medical supplies, or transportation."

— Robin Kirk, Human Rights Watch investigator in Colombia

Paramilitary violence is overwhelmingly targeted towards peasants, unionists, teachers, human rights workers, journalists and liberal or left-wing political activists. Paramilitary abuses in Colombia are often classified as atrocities due to the brutality of their methods, including the torture, rape, incineration, decapitation and mutilation with chainsaws or machetes of dozens of their victims at a time, affecting civilians, women and children.

Paramilitary forces in Colombia have additionally been charged with the illegal recruitment of children into the armed ranks. Though this is an offense punishable by national law, the prosecution rate for these crimes is less than 2% as of 2008. Many of these abuses have occurred with the knowledge and support of the Colombian security forces. A 1998 Human Rights Watch report stated:

... where paramilitaries have a pronounced presence, the army fails to move against them and tolerates their activity, including egregious violations of international humanitarian law; provides some paramilitary groups with intelligence used to carry out operations; and in other cases actively promotes and coordinates with paramilitary units, including joint maneuvers in which atrocities are the frequent result. ... In areas where paramilitaries are present, some police officers have been directly implicated in joint army-paramilitary actions or have supplied information to paramilitaries for their death lists. Police have also stood by while paramilitaries selected and killed their victims. On many occasions, police have publicly described whole communities as guerrillas or sympathetic to them and have withdrawn police protection, a violation of their responsibility under Colombian law to protect civilians from harm. Instead of reinforcing the police after guerrilla attacks, police commanders have withdrawn officers, thus encouraging or allowing paramilitaries to move in unimpeded and kill civilians.

A 1999-human rights report from the U.S. State Department said:

At times the security forces collaborated with paramilitary groups that committed abuses; in some instances, individual members of the security forces actively collaborated with members of paramilitary groups by passing them through roadblocks, sharing intelligence, and providing them with ammunition. Paramilitary forces find a ready support base within the military and police, as well as local civilian elites in many areas.

In 2006, Amnesty International reported that:

The security forces have tried to improve their human rights image by letting their paramilitary allies commit human rights violations and then denying that the paramilitaries are operating with their acquiescence, support or sometimes direct coordination.

=== Massacres ===
Hundreds of massacres have been perpetrated by paramilitary groups in Colombia.

"Each night they kill groups of five to six defenseless people, who are cruelly and monstrously massacred after being tortured. The screams of humble people are audible, begging for mercy and asking for help."

— Judge Leonardo Iván Cortés, Mapiripán, Meta, July 1997

==== Mapiripan Massacre ====
In Mapiripán, Meta Department, an estimated 30 people were killed between July 14 to 20 1997. At least 100 heavily armed AUC members arrived in the town searching for people who were suspected leftist guerrilla supporters. They went from house to house referring to a list of names that had been prepared by informants earlier.

Civilians were taken to the town center where they were tortured by paramilitaries before being killed. After torturing their victims, the paramilitaries decapitated people with chainsaws, hung people from meat hooks, hacked people with machetes, cut people's throats and carved their bodies, and then threw their corpses into the nearby Guaviare River.

The local judge of Mapiripan, Leonardo Ivan Cortes, called the police and the army eight times during the 5-day massacre, but they did not arrive until the AUC paramilitaries had left. In March 1999, Colombian prosecutors accused Colonel Lino Sánchez of planning the massacre with Carlos Castaño. Sánchez was the operations chief of the Colombian Army's 12th Brigade. He had received special training by U.S. Army Special Forces soldiers on Barrancón Island on the Guaviare River. The training was finished very close to the time of the massacre. The evidence showed that the paramilitaries landed unhampered at the San Jose del Guaviare airport, which was heavily guarded by military personnel.

==== Alto Naya massacre ====
Another massacre took place at Alto Naya, Cauca department on April 12, 2001, in which an estimated 40-130 civilians were killed and thousands displaced. Approximately 100 paramilitaries from the Frente Calima ("Calima Front") participated in the killings.

The first victim was a 17-year-old girl named Gladys Ipia whose head and hands were cut off with a chain saw. Next, six people were shot while eating at a local restaurant. Another man was chopped into pieces and burned. A woman had her abdomen ripped open with a chainsaw. An indigenous leader named Cayetano Cruz, was cut in half with a chainsaw. The paramilitaries lined up the villagers in the middle of the town, and asked people if they knew any guerrillas. If they answered "no", they were hacked to death with machetes. Many of the bodies were dismembered, and strewn piecemeal around the area, making it difficult to gain an accurate body count and identify victims. Between 4,000 and 6,000 people were displaced as they fled the area during and following the violence.

Despite repeated warnings over the preceding two weeks that such an attack was about to occur, the Colombian military refused to provide protection for the villagers. And although the massacre went on for more than three days, the nearby Third Brigade did not show up until after it was over. Yet, when the FARC attempted to take over a town, in neighboring Nariño, the military responded within three hours. Some of the villagers traveled to the Colombian Army's Third Brigade an hour away. The Cauca People's Defender, Victor Javier Melendez, notified the military that a massacre was occurring on the morning of April 13. He received no response. The Colombian Public Advocate's office stated: "it is inexplicable how approximately 500 paramilitaries could carry out an operation of this type without being challenged in any way, especially since the area that these men entered is only twenty minutes from the village of Timba, where a base operated by the Colombian Army is located and has been staffed since March 30 of this year."

==== Betoyes Massacre ====
Another massacre took place in Betoyes, Arauca department in early May 2003. Several people belonging to the indigenous Guahibo community were killed and over 300 people fled. Three girls, aged 11, 12, and 15, were raped. Another 16-year-old pregnant mother, Omaira Fernández was raped, and then had her womb cut open and the fetus ripped out which they then hacked up with a machete. They then dumped the bodies into the river. An Amnesty International reported on June 4, 2003, that the Colombian army's 18th Brigade's "Navos Pardo Battalion" fully supported the AUC in carrying out the massacre: "... in Betoyes in January 2003, witnesses said that the AUC armband of one attacker slipped to reveal the words 'Navos Pardo Battalion' printed on the uniform beneath."

=== Forced displacement ===
Displaced Embera-Catios Indian girl in Cazuca near Bogotá, Colombia. Paramilitary violence is responsible for most of the displacement in the country's ongoing conflict.

More than 5 million people out of Colombia's total population of approximately 40 million have been internally displaced since 1985, making it the country with the second highest internally displaced population in the world after Sudan. Over 3 million people have been displaced after President Álvaro Uribe took office in 2002, with over 300,000 displaced in 2005 alone.

Paramilitary groups have been held responsible for the largest portion of displacement. In the years 2000 and 2001, paramilitaries were blamed for 48 percent and 53 percent of forced displacement, respectively. The displacement is not only a side-effect of the civil conflict, but also a deliberate policy to remove people from their territories, so that the land can be taken by wealthy elites, multinational corporations, and criminal syndicates, as well as to attack the civilian support base for the guerrillas.

=== Social cleansing ===
Paramilitary groups, often with the support of local merchants, the Colombian military, and local police, have engaged in extensive "social cleansing" operations against homeless people, drug addicts, orphaned children, and other people they deem socially "undesirable". In 1993 alone, at least 2,190 street children were murdered, many of whom were killed by agents of the state. An estimated 5 people per day fell victim to social cleansing operations in 1995.

== Financing ==
=== Drug trade ===
The downfall of the Medellín and Cali Cartels in the 1990s created an opening for paramilitary groups, which controlled northern Colombia (the key transnational smuggling route), to take over the international cocaine trade.

In 2001, Colombian government sources estimated that at least 40% of all cocaine exports from Colombia were controlled by far-right paramilitary groups, while only 2.5% were controlled by the Revolutionary Armed Forces of Colombia (FARC).

=== Financing by U.S. corporations ===
==== Chiquita Brands International ====
From 1997 to 2004, Chiquita Brands International gave over $1.7 million to the AUC, over $825,000 of which was given after the U.S. State Department had listed the AUC as a Foreign Terrorist Organization. Families of some of the victims filed a class-action lawsuit, Doe v. Chiquita Brands International in 2007. The indictment alleges that the payments "were reviewed and approved by senior executives of the corporation" and that by no later than September 2000, they were aware "that the AUC was a violent, paramilitary organization". Separate charges were also filed alleging that in 2001, using a Colombian port owned and operated by Banadex (a subsidiary of Chiquita), the company transported 3,400 AK-47 rifles and 4 million rounds of ammunition, which were destined for the AUC. Mario Iguarán, Colombia's attorney general in 2007, said that he would seek extradition for several Chiquita executives as part of the weapons smuggling investigation. Lawyers from the U.S. Department of Justice learned of Chiquita's relationship with the AUC in 2003. They told Chiquita executives that the payments were illegal and ordered them to stop. After receiving the order, Chiquita made at least 19 more payments. Chiquita representatives said that they were only financing terrorist organizations "in good faith", for the protection of their employees. To date, none of the Chiquita executives have been indicted for terrorism, however the company did receive a fine of $25 million. The plea deal was negotiated by Eric Holder, who was then an attorney with the law firm Covington & Burling, which represented Chiquita Brands.

==== Drummond Coal ====
In the late 1980s, Alabama-based Drummond Coal began to expand into new markets, due to the deregulation of global capital. As part of this expansion, they purchased the Pribbenow coal mine in Colombia, as well as a Caribbean port to ship the coal. They increased production at the mine by 20 million tons annually, turning it into one of the largest coal-mining operations in the world. It made up the largest share of Drummond's $1.7 billion in annual revenues.

Since it started operating in the early 1990s, Drummond's 215-mile railway has been repeatedly attacked by the FARC-EP. There is evidence that right-wing paramilitaries were hired by Drummond to guard the rail lines. In 2001, union activists working at Drummond's Colombian operations began receiving frequent death threats. In February of that year, AUC paramilitaries broke into the home of union organizer Cándido Méndez and killed him in front of his family. This was followed by a series of killings in March.

==== The Coca-Cola Company ====
In July 2001 four lawsuits were filed against The Coca-Cola Company by the International Labor Rights Fund (ILRF) and the United Steel Workers of America on behalf of Sinaltrainal (a union representing food and beverage workers in Colombia), five individuals who had been tortured or unlawfully detained for union activities, and the estate of murdered union activist Isidro Gil. The plaintiffs alleged that Coca-Cola bottlers "contracted with or otherwise directed paramilitary security forces that utilized extreme violence and murdered, tortured, unlawfully detained, or otherwise silenced trade union leaders." Coca-Cola does not deny that the murders and attacks on unionists took place at their bottling facilities, nor did they deny that the paramilitaries responsible for the killings were being paid by the bottlers, but they claimed that they could not be held liable because they are not in direct control of the bottling plants. In March 2001, district judge Jose E. Martinez decided in Miami that Coca-Cola could not be held liable, claiming they did not directly control the bottling plants, but allowed the case against the bottling companies to proceed forward.

== Political activities ==
The Colombian parapolitics scandal or parapolítica in Spanish (a combination of the words paramilitar and política) refers to the 2006–present Colombian congressional scandal in which several congressmen and other politicians have been indicted for colluding with the United Self-Defense Forces of Colombia (AUC), a paramilitary group which is responsible for killing thousands of Colombian civilians. In February 2007, Colombian Senator Jorge Enrique Robledo suggested another term, "parauribismo", indicating that the scandal was mainly affecting officials or political allies of President Álvaro Uribe's administration. By April 17, 2012, 139 members of Congress were under investigation. Five governors and 32 lawmakers, including Mario Uribe Escobar, President Uribe's cousin and former President of Congress, were convicted.

== See also ==
- Triple A (American Anti-communist Alliance)
- Brazilian militias
- Carlos Castaño
- Colombia–United States relations
- Colombian Armed Conflict
- Colombian parapolitics scandal
- Conservatism in Colombia
- Plan Colombia
- Militia organizations in the United States
- Ultraconservatism
- United Self-Defense Forces of Colombia
