= List of accidents and incidents involving helicopters =

This article is a list of accidents and incidents involving helicopters and which are notable enough to have an article on Wikipedia. It is grouped by the years in which the accidents and incidents occurred.

== 1960s ==
1968

- 22 May – Sikorsky S-61L N303Y, operating Los Angeles Airways Flight 841, suffers a mechanical failure in flight which allows the rotor blades to collide with the aircraft's fuselage. It crashes at Paramount, California, killing all 23 people on board.
- 14 August – Sikorsky S-61L N300Y, operating Los Angeles Airways Flight 417, loses a rotor blade in flight and crashes at Compton, California. All 21 people on board are killed.

== 1970s ==
1975

- 17 January – Sikorsky S-55B helicopter crashes in Iceland while en route from Reykjavík Airport to Snæfellsnes.

1977

- 10 May – A Sikorsky CH-53 Yas'ur of the Israeli Air Force crashes in the Jordan Valley. All 54 people on board are killed.

1978

- 21 June – Two Boeing CH-47 Chinooks of the Imperial Iranian Air Force are shot down by the Soviet Air Defence Forces after straying into Turkmen Soviet Socialist Republic airspace. One aircraft is destroyed with the loss of eight lives. The other is damaged; it is later repaired with permission from Soviet authorities and returns to Iran.
- 26 June – Sikorsky S-61 LN-OQS of Helikopter Service loses a rotor blade in flight and crashes into the North Sea off Bergen, Norway. All 18 people on board are killed.

== 1980s ==
1981

- 13 August – Westland Wessex G-ASWI of Bristow Helicopters suffers an engine failure and ditches in the North Sea off the coast of Norfolk, United Kingdom. All thirteen people on board are killed.

1982

- 23 July – Bell UH-1 Iroquois N87701 of Western Helicopters is damaged by pyrotechnic explosions and crashes while a scene for Twilight Zone: The Movie is being filmed at Indian Dunes, California. Actor Vic Morrow and two child actors are killed on the ground.
- 14 September – Bell 212 G-BDIL owned by Bristow Helicopters crashes while on a nighttime search and rescue mission in the North Sea, killing all six crew members on board.

1983

- 16 July – Sikorsky S-61 G-BEON of British Airways crashes into the Atlantic Ocean between the coast of Cornwall and the Isles of Scilly. Twenty of the 26 people on board are killed.

1984

- 23 October – A Bell UH-1H (number 284) of the Salvadoran Air Force is bombed by the Farabundo Martí National Liberation Front (FMLN) during the Salvadoran Civil War. All 14 people on board the helicopter are killed, including Lieutenant Colonel Domingo Monterrosa. The bomb was hidden in a reserve radio transmitter used by the FMLN's Radio Venceremos and was captured by Monterrosa's forces as a war trophy.

1986

- 18 June – Bell 206 N6TC of Helitech collides with Grand Canyon Airlines Flight 6 in mid-air over the Grand Canyon in Arizona, United States. All five people on board are killed, as are all twenty people on board the de Havilland Twin Otter that it collided with.
- 2 October – A Mil Mi-8 involved in the cleanup effort that followed the Chernobyl disaster struck the cable of a crane at Chernobyl Nuclear Power Plant, Ukrainian SSR, Soviet Union, and fell to the ground, killing all four people on board.
- 6 November – Boeing 234LR Chinook G-BWFC of British International Helicopters suffers a mechanical failure. The aircraft ditches at sea off Sumburgh Airport, Shetland Islands, killing 45 of the 47 people on board.

1988

- 13 July – Sikorsky S-61N G-BEID of British International Helicopters suffers an engine fire and ditches into the North Sea off the Shetland Islands. All 21 people on board are rescued.

== 1990s ==
1990

- 27 August – A Bell 206 helicopter carrying musicians and event staff following a concert crashes into the side of a ski slope in Elkhorn, Wisconsin, killing all five people on board including blues rock guitarist Stevie Ray Vaughan.

1991

- 4 April – A Bell 412 and Piper Aerostar collide in mid-air in a suburb of Philadelphia, Pennsylvania. All five people on both aircraft, including United States senator John Heinz, along with two children on the ground, are killed.
- 25 October – A Bell 206 crashes into a high-voltage transmission tower near Vallejo, California, during bad weather. All three on board are killed, including Bill Graham.
- 20 November – A Mil Mi-8 belonging to the Azerbaijani Government is shot down by the Armenian military during the Nagorno-Karabakh War and crashes near Karakend. All 22 people on board are killed.

1992

- 28 January – An Azerbaijani Mil Mi-8 is shot down near Shusha by Armenian forces. All 44 people on board are killed.

1993

- 26 November – Aérospatiale AS 355 F1 ZK-HIT of the New Zealand Police collides in mid-air with Piper Archer ZK-ENX over Auckland. Both aircraft crash, killing all four people on board.

1994

- 2 June – Boeing Chinook HC2 ZD576 of the Royal Air Force crashes on the Mull of Kintyre, Argyll. All 29 people on board are killed.

1995

- 19 January – Aérospatiale AS332 Super Puma G-TIGK, operating Bristow Flight 56C is struck by lightning and ditches in the North Sea off the coast of Aberdeenshire. All 18 people on board survive.

1996

- 16 September – a Eurocopter HH-65 Dolphin Israeli Navy helicopter (tail number 905) crashed into the Mediterranean Sea, approximately 12 miles (19 kilometers) off the coast of Nahariya, Israel. All three crew members aboard were killed, marking the first fatalities in the history of Squadron 193.

1997

- 4 February – Two Sikorsky S-65C-3 Yas'ur 2000s of the Israeli Air Force collide in mid-air over She'ar Yashuv and crash. All 73 people on board the two aircraft are killed.
- 8 September – Eurocopter AS332L Super Puma LN-OPG operating Helikopter Service Flight 451 suffers a mechanical failure and crashes into the Norwegian Sea. All 12 people on board are killed.

== 2000s ==
2000

- 16 September – A Mil Mi-17 of the Sri Lanka Air Force crashes in Aranayake near Kandy, Sri Lanka. All 15 people on board, including outgoing Ports Minister M H M Ashraff, were killed.

2001

- 17 September – A Mil Mi-8 of the Russian Armed Forces is shot down at Grozny, Chechnya. All 13 people on board are killed.

2002

- 27 January – A Mil Mi-8 of the Russian Ministry of Internal Affairs is shot down near Shelkovskaya, Chechnya. All fourteen people on board are killed.
- 16 July – Sikorsky S-76A G-BJVX of Bristow Helicopters crashes into the North Sea off the coast of Norfolk following the loss of its rotor head in flight. All 11 people on board are killed.
- 19 August – A Mil Mi-26 of the Russian Air Force is shot down by Chechen separatists and crashes at Khankala, Chechnya. 127 people are killed.

2003

- 4 December – A Mil Mi-8 of the Polish Air Force crashes near Piaseczno. All fifteen people on board, including the Polish Prime Minister, Leszek Miller, survive.

2005

- 26 January – A Sikorsky CH-53E Super Stallion crashes while flying during a sandstorm in the Al-Anbar province of western Iraq, near the town of Ar-Rutbah. All 31 occupants were killed.
- 10 August – Sikorsky S-76C+ OH-HCI, operating Copterline Flight 103, crashes into Tallinn Bay. All 14 people on board are killed.

2006

- 10 December – Bell 412SP N410MA of Mercy Air Services, Inc. crashes near Hesperia, California. All three people on board are killed.
- 27 December – Eurocopter AS365 Dauphin G-BLUN of CHC Helicopter crashes into Morecambe Bay. All six people on board are killed.

2007

- 5 March – An Aérospatiale AS 332C1 Super Puma collide in mid-air with a smaller Diamond DV20 Katana near the Zell am See Airport in Austria. All eight people on board the two aircraft were killed.
- 27 April – A Mil Mi-8 of the Russian Air Force crashes near Shatoy, Chechnya. All twenty people on board are killed.
- 3 June – A Mil Mi-8 of Paramount Airlines crashes at Lungi, Sierra Leone. 22 of the 23 occupants on board are killed.
- 27 July – Two Eurocopter AS350 AStars collide in mid-air above Phoenix, Arizona. All four people on board the two aircraft are killed.

2008

- 12 January – Mil Mi-17 transport helicopter belonging to the Armed Forces of the Republic of Macedonia crashes near the village of Blace, in the region of Katlanovo, approximately 10–15 kilometres south-east of Skopje. All 11 individuals aboard the helicopter, including eight passengers and three crew members, are killed.

2009

- 17 January – A Eurocopter AS 532 of the French Navy crashes shortly after take-off from the amphibious assault ship Foudre off the coast of Gabon. Eight of the ten people on board are killed.
- 12 March – A Sikorsky S-92 suffers a mechanical failure and ditches in the Atlantic Ocean off the coast of Newfoundland, Canada. Seventeen of the 18 people on board are killed.
- 25 March – A Bell 206L-4 LongRanger crashes into Mount Keş, Turkey, killing all six people on board.
- 1 April – A Eurocopter AS332L2 Super Puma Mk 2 of Bond Offshore Helicopters suffers a mechanical failure and crashes into the North Sea off the coast of Aberdeenshire. All 16 people on board are killed.
- 3 May – A Mil Mi-17 of the Venezuelan Army crashes in Táchira province. All seventeen people on board are killed.
- 3 July – A Pakistan Army Mil Mi-17 helicopter crashes in Khyber Pass, Pakistan, killing all 41 people on board.
- 8 August – A Eurocopter AS350 collides with a Piper PA-32R over the Hudson River between Hoboken, New Jersey and New York City, United States. The six occupants of the helicopter and the three occupants of the Piper aircraft all perish.
- 2 September – Andhra Pradesh Chief Minister Y. S. Rajasekhara Reddy's Bell 430 helicopter crashes, killing all five people on board.

== 2010s ==
2010

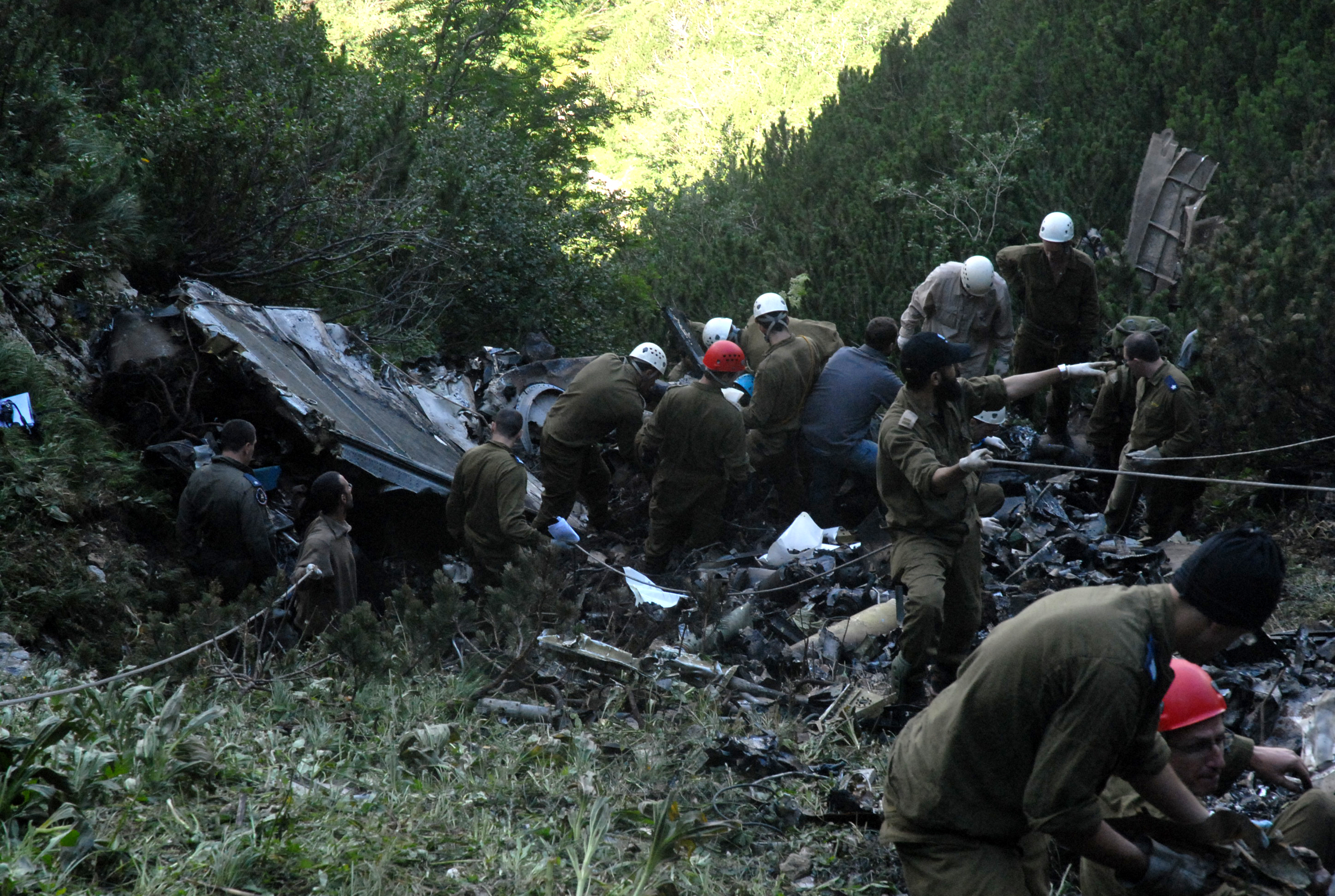
The wreckage of the Israeli Air Force Sikorsky CH-53 Yas'ur.

- 26 July – A Sikorsky CH-53 Yas'ur of the Israeli Air Force crashes in the Bucegi Mountains, Romania. All seven people on board are killed.

2011

- 19 April – Mil Mi-172 VT-PHF of Pawan Hans crashes on landing at Tawang, India. Seventeen of the 23 people on board are killed.
- 6 August – A Boeing CH-47 Chinook of the United States Military is shot down by a rocket propelled grenade in Afghanistan. All 38 people on board and a military dog are killed.

2012

- 10 June – A Eurocopter AS350 Écureuil of the Kenya Police crashes in the Ngong Forest. All six people on board are killed.
- 21 December – Mil Mi-8 RA-27003, operating as United Nations Flight 544, is shot down by the Sudan People's Liberation Army in a friendly fire incident at Likuangole, South Sudan, killing all five people on board.

2013

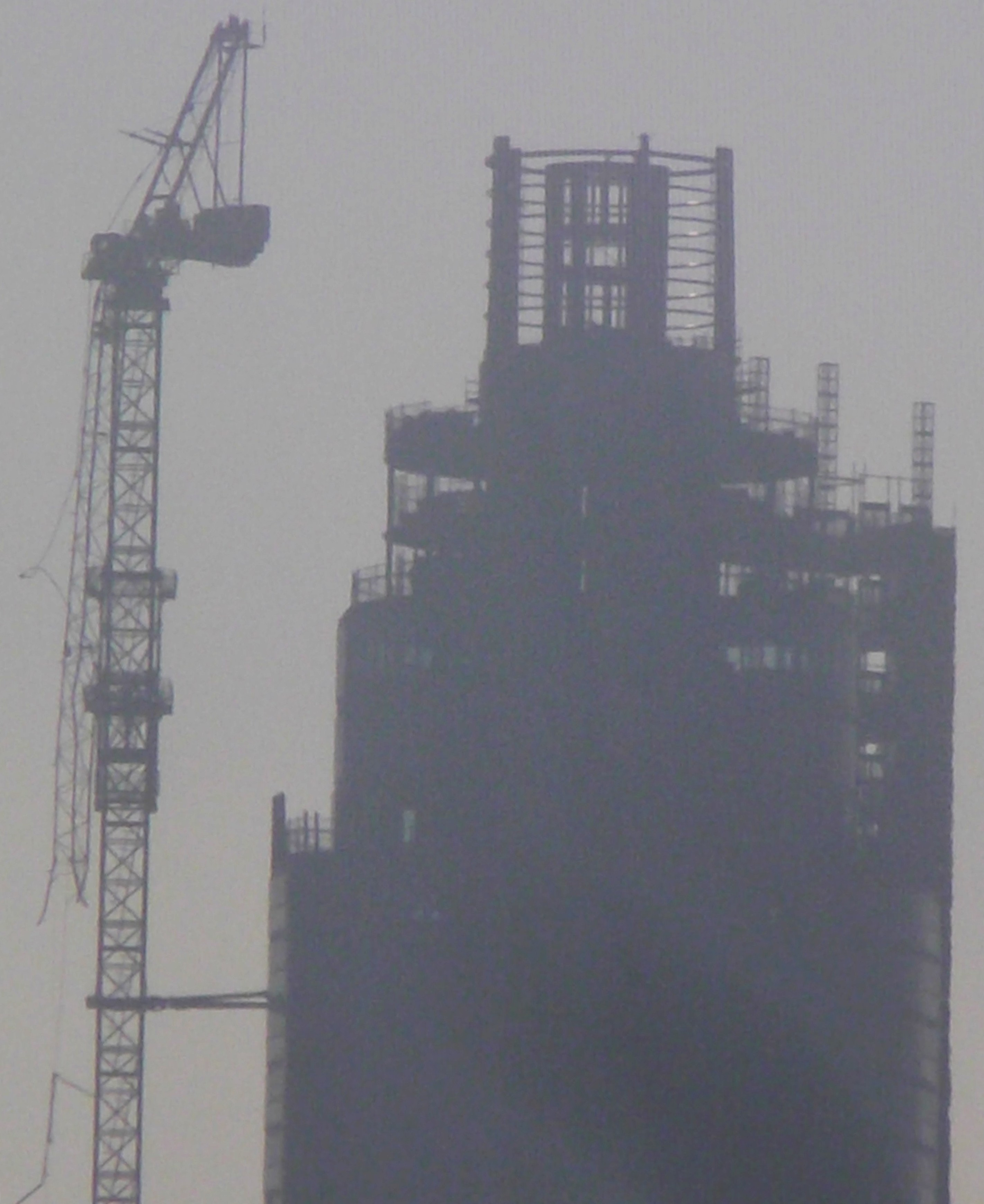
The damaged crane after the 16 January accident.

- 16 January – Castle Air AgustaWestland AW109 G-CRST collides with a crane at Vauxhall, London and crashes. The pilot is killed, as is a pedestrian.
- 21 March – A Eurocopter EC155 and a Eurocopter AS332 Super Puma collide on the ground near the Olympic Stadium in Berlin, leaving one crew member dead.
- 7 April – A Helipac Mil Mi8-PS crashes in the Loreto Region of Peru. All 13 people on board are killed.
- 2 July – Polar Airlines Mil Mi-8 RA-22657 crashes near Deputatsky, Russia. Twenty-four of the 28 people on board are killed.
- 23 August – A CHC Eurocopter AS332 Super Puma Mk 2 crashes into the sea 2 nm from Sumburgh in the Shetland Islands, Scotland while en route from Borgsten Dolphin oil platform. The accident kills four of the passengers; twelve other passengers and two crew were rescued.
- 29 November – A Police Scotland EC135 T2 crashes into a pub in Glasgow, Scotland. Three occupants of the aircraft are killed, as are seven pub patrons.

2014

- 13 March – AgustaWestland AW139 G-LBAL of Haughey Air crashes shortly after take-off from Gillingham, Norfolk, killing all four people on board
- 12 November – an Armenian Mil Mi-24 is shot down near Gəngərli village, Aghdam, Nagorno-Karabakh Republic, killing all three crew members.

2015

- 9 March – Two Eurocopter AS350B3 Ecureuils LQ-CGK and LQ-FJQ collide in mid-air and crash, killing all ten people on board.
- 10 March – A United States Army Sikorsky UH-60 Black Hawk crashes off the coast of the Florida Panhandle during a training exercise, killing all eleven people on board.
- On 8 May 2015, a Pakistan Army Mi-17 crashes near the Naltar area of Gilgit in Gilgit-Baltistan, killing the Norwegian and Philippine ambassadors and the wives of the Malaysian and Indonesian ambassadors. Two Army pilots, Major Al-Tamash and Major Faisal, are also killed. The Polish and Dutch ambassadors are injured.
- 4 August – A UH-60 Black Hawk helicopter crashes in northwestern Colombia, killing 16 of the 18 people on board
- 21 November – A Eurocopter AS350D Astar helicopter crashes on Fox Glacier in the South Island of New Zealand, killing all seven people on board.

2016

- 14 January – Two U.S. Marine Corps CH53E helicopters collide off the coast of Oahu, Hawaii, killing all 12 passengers on board.
- 29 April – A CHC Helikopter Service Eurocopter EC225 crashes near Turøy, Norway. All 13 people on board are killed.
- 26 June – A Colombian Army Mil Mi-17 crashes in mountainous terrain 180 km north-west of Bogota, killing all 17 passengers on board.
- 6 July 2016 – Prototype Bell 525 Relentless crashes near Italy, Texas, destroying the prototype Bell 525 Relentless helicopter and killing the two occupants.
- 21 October – A Skol Airlines Mil Mi-8 operating as Skol Airlines Flight 9375 crashed in Siberia's Yamal Peninsula, killing 19 of the 22 people on board.

2017

- 10 March – A Sikorsky S-76 crashes in Istanbul, killing all seven people on board.
- 14 March – A Sikorsky S-92 crashes off County Mayo on Ireland′s west coast. All four crew members die.
- 8 September – A Schweizer 269C helicopter crashed after an uncontrolled descent during a power-off landing attempt at the Flying W Airport in Medford, New Jersey, killing two, including country musician Troy Gentry.

2018

- 17 January – A Bell UH-1H Iroquois helicopter crashes and catches fire near Raton, New Mexico, killing five of the six people on board.
- 27 October – An AgustaWestland AW169 helicopter carrying Leicester City F.C. chairman Vichai Srivaddhanaprabha crashes and catches fire outside the King Power Stadium in Leicester, United Kingdom, killing all five people on board.

2019

- February 11 – A Bell 206 crashed into the Rodoanel Mário Covas highway while making an emergency landing after a mechanical failure. Both people on board were killed, including Ricardo Boechat.
- February 27 – An Air Dynasty Eurocopter AS350 crashed near Taplejung, Nepal, killing all seven people on board.
- 31 August – A Eurocopter AS350 Écureuil sightseeing helicopter crashes in Alta, Norway, killing all six occupants.

== 2020s ==
2020

- 26 January – A Sikorsky S-76 helicopter carrying retired basketball player Kobe Bryant, along with his 13-year-old daughter Gianna Maria "Gigi" Bryant, crashes outside of Calabasas, California, killing all nine on board.

2021

- 4 March – A Turkish Air Force (TAF) Eurocopter AS532 Cougar, en route to Tatvan District in Bitlis, Turkey, crashes in Bitlis Province. Eleven servicemen on board are killed in the crash, while two other servicemen survive.
- 5 March – A Robinson R44 helicopter carrying Botswana musician Sasa Klaas, crashes in the outskirts of Xumabee near Sojwe. Klaas is killed, but the pilot survives.
- 7 March – A Eurocopter AS350 Écureuil carrying French billionaire Olivier Dassault crashes shortly after takeoff in northwestern France near Deauville. Dassault and the pilot, the only people on board, are both killed.
- 8 December – A helicopter carrying the Chief of Defence Staff of India General Bipin Rawat and 13 others crashed near Coonoor in Tamil Nadu, killing all 14 on board.

2023

- 2 January – Two Eurocopter EC130s collided near Sea World in Gold Coast, Queensland, Australia, killing four people and injuring eight.
- 18 January – A Eurocopter EC225 Super Puma carrying the Minister of Internal Affairs of Ukraine, Denys Monastyrsky and other ministry officials, crashed at a kindergarten in Brovary, a suburb of Kyiv. The crash killed at least eighteen people, including Monastyrsky, while at least 29 others were injured.
- 29 March – Two U.S. Army Sikorsky HH-60 Pave Hawk helicopters collided during a training mission over Trigg County, Kentucky, killing all nine people on board.

2024

- 23 April – An AgustaWestland AW139 collided with a Eurocopter Fennec over the town of Lumut, Perak, Malaysia during a military parade rehearsal in celebration of the 90th anniversary of the Royal Malaysian Navy, killing all 10 crew members: seven on the former and three on the latter, respectively.
- 19 May – A Bell 212 helicopter crashed near Varzaqan, Iran, resulting in the death of Iranian President Ebrahim Raisi, Hossein Amir-Abdollahian, Malek Rahmati, and Mohammad Ali Ale-Hashem who were passengers on board.
- 31 August – A Mil Mi-8T helicopter crashed over Kamchatka, Russia. All 22 occupants on board were killed.
- 8 September – A Bell UH-1H Iroquois of the Salvadoran Air Force crashed in Pasaquina, El Salvador. The crash killed all 9 occupants, including Mauricio Arriaza Chicas, the director of the National Civil Police.

2025

- 29 January – A U.S. Army Sikorsky UH-60 Black Hawk collided with an American Eagle CRJ700 over the Potomac River. All 67 occupants on board were killed.
- 10 April – A Bell 206 helicopter broke up in mid-air and crashed into the Hudson River. All 6 occupants on board were killed.
- 6 August – A Ghanaian Air Force Harbin Z-9 helicopter carrying eight people to an event about fighting illegal mining crashed into a forested mountainside in the Ashanti region of Ghana, killing all eight people on board.

2026

- 20 January – A Robinson R44 Raven II on a sightseeing tour crashed inside Mount Aso, Kyushu, Japan. It is unknown what happened to all 3 people on board.
- 14 June – A Eurocopter AS 350 B2 and a Bell 206B collided above Rio de Janeiro, Brazil, killing all combined six passengers, including singer Oliver Tree, YouTuber Gaspi, director Lucas A. Vignale and music producer Lucas Frota.
- 28 June – A Leonardo AW139 operating an offshore flight for Saudi Aramco crashed on approach to Ras Tanura Airport, Eastern Province, Saudi Arabia, killing all 14 people on board.
- 8 September – A Bölkow BO-105 helicopter operated by Layang Layang Aerospace crashed and caught fire near Long Lellang STOLport in Sarawak, Malaysia, during an official flying doctor service mission, killing all five people on board.
- 15 September – A Eurocopter AS350 news helicopter operated by NBC crashed in the Chatsworth neighbourhood of Los Angeles, California, United States as they were reporting on a previous vehicle accident. Journalist Eliana Moreno, pilot George Marciniw, and a person on the ground, Edy Gutierrez Mejia, were killed.
