= 2026 Long Lellang helicopter crash =

Aviation incident in Malaysia

- Flying Doctor Services 9M-LLL, similar to the aircraft involved

Accident
- Date: 8 September 2026
- Summary: Engine fire and crash during landing approach
- Site: Near Long Lellang Airport, Ulu Baram, Sarawak, Malaysia

Aircraft
- Aircraft type: Bölkow BO-105
- Operator: Layang Layang Aerospace (on behalf of the Ministry of Health)
- Registration: 9M-LLF
- Flight origin: Miri Airport
- Destination: Long Lellang Airport
- Occupants: 5
- Passengers: 4
- Crew: 1
- Fatalities: 5
- Survivors: 0

On 8 September 2026, a Bölkow BO-105 helicopter operated by Layang Layang Aerospace crashed and caught fire near Long Lellang STOLport in Ulu Baram, Sarawak, Malaysia. The aircraft was executing an official flying doctor service mission on behalf of the health ministry when it encountered a suspected engine fire during its landing approach. All five individuals on board, consisting of the pilot and four medical personnel were killed in the accident. The Civil Aviation Authority of Malaysia and the Air Accident Investigation Bureau have launched a safety investigation to determine the definitive cause of the crash.

== Background ==
The flying doctor service in Sarawak is a critical initiative managed by the health ministry to deliver vital medical care, emergency transport and clinical services to isolated rural communities in the state's mountainous and densely forested interior. Due to the severe lack of accessible road infrastructure in regions like Ulu Baram, the service relies heavily on STOL airstrips and helicopter operations to deploy medical personnel.

The aircraft involved in the accident was a twin-engine Bölkow BO-105 S (CBS 5) helicopter, manufactured in Germany in 1991. Registered as 9M-LLF, it was owned and operated by Layang Layang Aerospace, a regional charter aviation company contracted by the government to support the state's rural healthcare logistics. The helicopter had a long-standing operational history in the region, having been actively utilized for Sarawak's flying doctor service missions for 17 years since 2009. According to statements from the Civil Aviation Authority of Malaysia and regional police, the aircraft was deemed fully airworthy and had undergone its most recent routine scheduled maintenance check on 24 August 2026, just two weeks prior to the incident.

On the day of the accident, the helicopter was operating under the tactical callsign "MEDIC-3". It departed from Miri Airport on a scheduled multi-stop routing aimed at serving rural clinics, covering Miri, Ba Lai, Long Siut, and its final intended destination, Long Lellang.

== Crew and passengers ==
The helicopter carried five individuals on board, consisting of one flight crew member and four medical personnel from the health ministry. There were no survivors. The occupants were identified as

1. Captain Zainol Afiq Bee Sham, 30, the pilot, from Negeri Sembilan
2. Dr Ainul Baraah Kamaruddin, 33, a medical officer assigned to the rural healthcare deployment team, from Kelantan
3. Alexson Adit Henry, 31, an assistant medical officer, Miri-born
4. Debra Moset, 40, a staff nurse, from Padawan
5. Jessie Paya Jok, 44, a staff nurse, Miri-born

== See also ==
- List of accidents and incidents involving helicopters
