= Halcones =

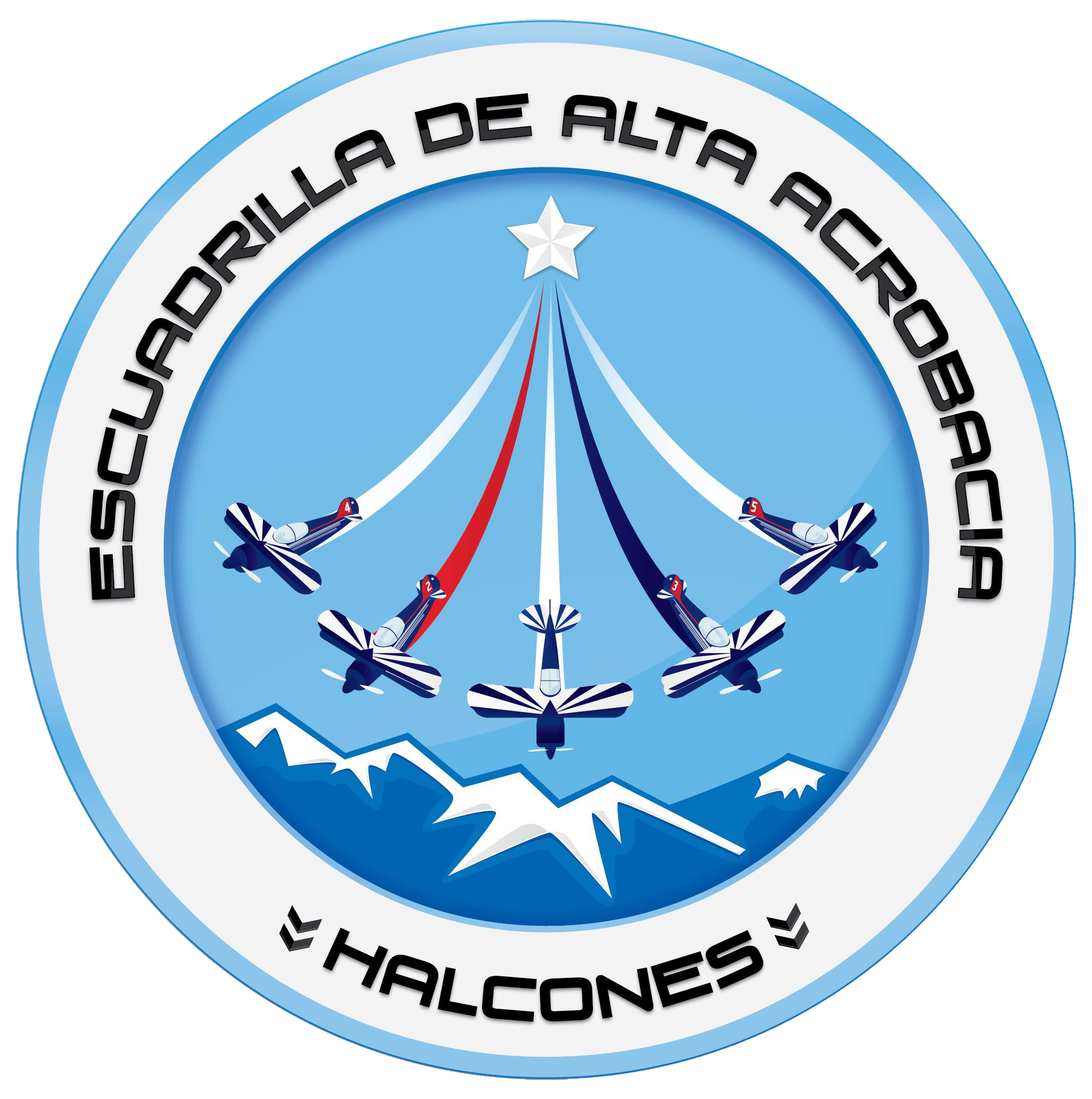
- Halcones insignia
- Active: 1981–present
- Country: Chile
- Branch: Chilean Air Force
- Role: Aerobatic flight display team
- Size: 5 Aircraft
- Colours: White, Red, Blue

Aircraft flown
- Trainer: GameBird GB1

Escuadrilla de Alta Acrobacia Halcones ("Hawks High Aerobatics Squad"), known simply as the 'Hawks' (Halcones), is an active group of nine officers of the Chilean Air Force who are trained specifically for aerobatics. One of the Halcones' signature moves is recreating the Chilean star in the air using smoke. The team may be likened to the British Royal Air Force's Red Arrows for their affinity for complex, high-risk, aviation-based manoeuvers.

The team flies GameBird GB1 aircraft. The Halcones have performed demonstrations in airshows in Argentina, Ecuador, Brazil, United Kingdom, Belgium, United States, Canada, Israel, France, Peru, Uruguay and Bolivia.

== Aircraft ==
=== Pitts S2A ===
==== 1981-1990 ====
The Halcones was formed on January 14, 1981 as the Escuadilla de Alta Acrobacia "Halcones," equipped with four Pitts Special aerobatic biplanes, although the team later increased to five aircraft. The Air Force acquired models S-2A and S-2S (the latter for the solo display). This agile biplane, which is American-made, is powered by a 200 hp Lycoming engine. The S-2S is powered by a 260 hp engine.

The Halcones used the Pitts for about 400 events in their home country and abroad. During these years, the notoriety of the pilots grew in Chile, and resulted in many invitations to international events, such as the following:

The last presentation made with these planes was on February 25, 1990.

=== Extra 300 ===
==== 1990 - 2003 ====
The Air Force, aware of the new and advancing aeronautic technology, decided to replace the Pitts for a new plane: the Extra 300.

This German-produced monoplane-wing media is powered by a Textron Lycoming engine of 300 hp. 2700 rpm 6-cylinder and 3-propeller wood blades covered with carbon fiber. The two-seater plane is built from 60% composite materials and 40% metal, and features a load factor and G + 10 - 10 G, roll rate of 360 ° per second, maximum weight 950 kg. The plane was designed to make various aerobatic maneuvers, but can only sustain 4 minutes of inverted flight.

The squad made approximately 400 presentations with the Extra 300 planes in Chile (from Arica to Punta Arenas, as well as Easter Island) and abroad. The "Halcones" presentations during this time resulted in numerous invitations to perform, such as the following:

The last presentation made by the Extra 300 plane was on May 13, 2012.

The Halcones Aerobatic Team achieved many important distinctions with the Extra 300 aircraft and its skilled Air Force pilots.

=== Extra 300L ===
==== 2003 - 2020 ====
Due to the success achieved with the Extra 300, the Team began flying the new Extra 300 L. The Extra 300 L was a result of modifications and updates to the older Extra 300 model.

This low-wing monoplane of German origin is powered by a Textron Lycoming engine of 300 hp. 2700 rpm. 6-cylinder and 4-propeller wood blades coated with carbon fiber. The two-seater plane is made of 60% composite materials and 40% metal, and features a load factor and G + 10 - 10 G, why roll of 420 ° per second, in the silencer tailpipe, maximum weight 950 kg. This version was also designed for acrobatics, but still has only 4 minutes of inverted flight time.

=== GB1 GameBird ===
==== 2020 - currently in use ====
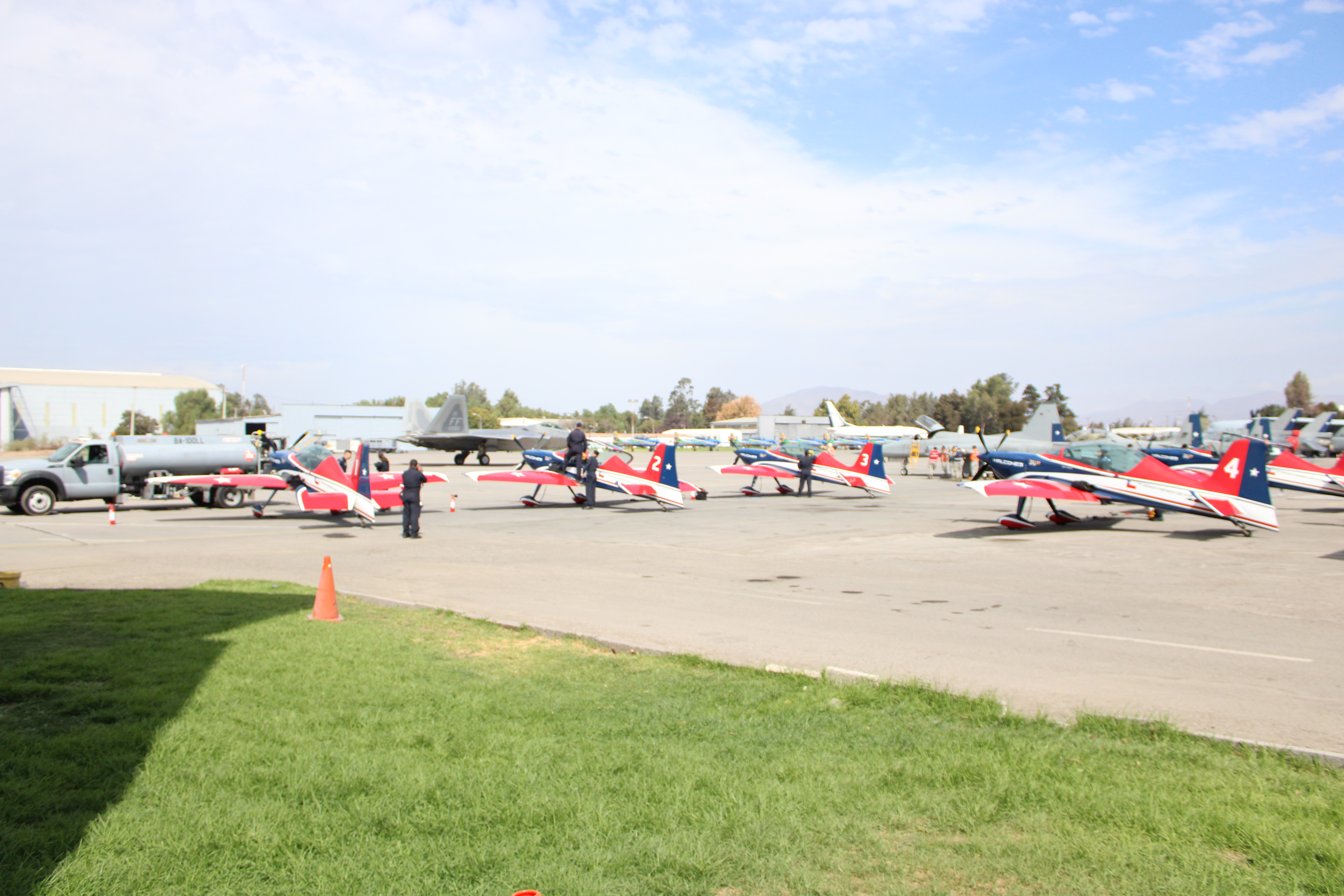
Some GB1 Game Birds of the FACH Halcones

During a meeting of Chilean Air Force new Commander in Chief, general Arturo Merino Nuñez with specialized press (March 5, 2019), it was confirmed that the new aircraft of Halcones aerobatic team will be the GameBird GB1. Seven of the type are set to be received over July and December 2019, with its public début intended for FIDAE 2020.

== Awards ==
Throughout the 31-year tenure, the High Aerobatics Squad "Halcones (Hawks)" has visited countries like Ecuador, Brazil, Canada, USA, England, Belgium, Israel, France and Peru.

=== Best Air Display ===
This prize was awarded in the city of Springfield, Illinois, United States, 1990, in honor of the presentation made by the then new aircraft, the Extra-300. The High Aerobatics Squad "Halcones (Hawks)" Team was the first team to use this aircraft for their demonstrations. The prize was awarded to the squad after just one year's experience in the Extra-300.

=== Sir Douglas Bader ===
This prize was awarded to the squad on their second visit to England for the 1993 International Air Tattoo. On this occasion, the Hawks' performance earned them the most prestigious prize of the festival.

=== Best Individual Flying Demonstration ===
In 1993, during participation in the International Air Tattoo in England, the squad received the prize for best presentation of a Team abroad, and the airplane "only" training was recognized with the distinction as "Best Individual Presentation."

=== 50 anniversary of the USAF ===
As part of the ceremony for the U.S. Air Force commemoration in 1997, the High Aerobatics Squad "Halcones (Hawks)" was invited to participate in the celebration in recognition of their prestigious career.

=== 50 anniversary of IAF ===
In 1998, during the 50th anniversary of the Israel Air Force, the High Aerobatics Squad "Halcones (Hawks)" was invited to participate in aerial events.

=== Ives Duval ===
This prize was awarded in the town of Evreux, France, in July 1998, during the First World Championship Patrol Acrobat, held to mark the centenary of the Aero-Club de France. This festival invited thirteen countries with their respective aerial teams, with the High Aerobatics Squad "Halcones (Hawks)" chosen as the "Best of the Best." The pilots participating in this event were tasked with electing the winning team; the prize was awarded by the French Defense Minister, accompanied by the Commander in Chief of the Air Force.

== Incidents ==
On August 8, 2007 the number 5 plane, piloted by Captain Mario Costa, had to make an emergency landing after hitting another plane in the group during an exercise. At landfall, the plane hit a parked vehicle, but the pilot was rescued without injuries.

On November 9, 2011, during a routine training exercise on "El Bosque", and after a tour across the country, pilot number 3, Lieutenant Cristián Padilla, 28 years old, crashed his aircraft (Extra-300L), resulting in the pilot's death. The exact cause of the accident is still being investigated.
