= 2016 Bell 525 Relentless prototype crash =

Aviation incident in Texas, United States

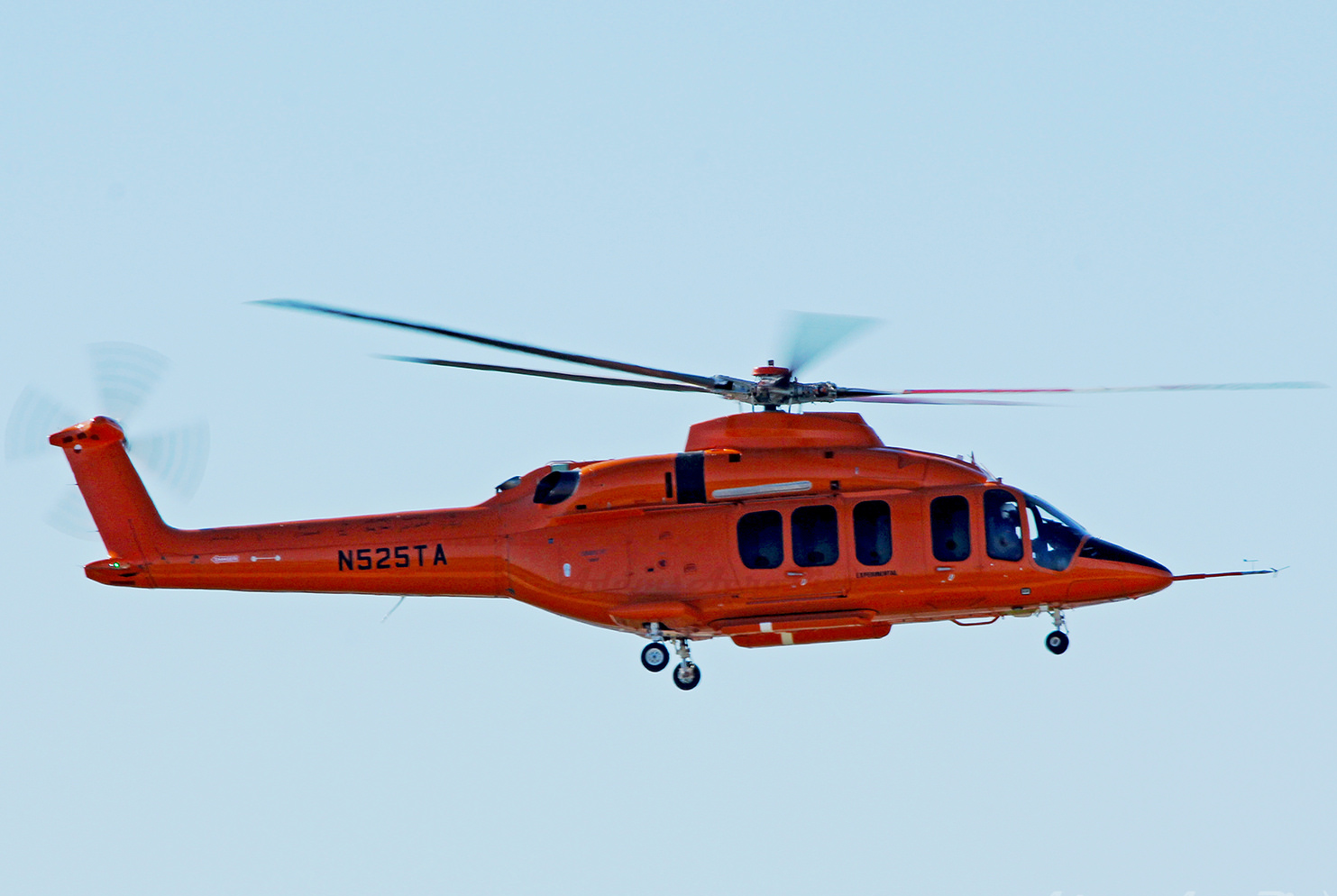
- N525TA in 2015

Accident
- Date: July 6, 2016
- Summary: In-flight breakup
- Site: Italy, Texas, US; 32.2443°N 96.9130°W

Aircraft
- Aircraft type: Bell 525 Relentless
- Operator: Bell Aircraft
- Registration: N525TA
- Flight origin: Arlington Municipal Airport (GKY)
- Destination: Arlington Municipal Airport (GKY)
- Occupants: 2
- Passengers: 0
- Crew: 2
- Fatalities: 2
- Survivors: 0

The 2016 Bell 525 Relentless prototype crash occurred during a test flight on July 6, 2016, near Italy, Texas, destroying the prototype Bell 525 Relentless helicopter and killing the two occupants. The helicopter broke up in flight while traveling about 229 mph (199 kn) at an altitude of about 2,000 feet (610 m); the main rotor contacted and severed the tail boom due to severe vertical oscillations. The crew were performing one engine inoperative (OEI) recovery testing; the test induced a scissors-mode vibration in the main rotor, which resulted in involuntary collective control input. The unintended biomechanical feedback loop exacerbated the vibration, until the rotor contacted the tail-boom.

The destruction of the prototype delayed type certification of the Bell 525 for a year and a filter was added to the collective input control to avoid recurrence of the biomechanical feedback.

== Aircraft ==
The accident involved the first Bell 525 Relentless prototype test vehicle (registration N525TA), built in 2015 and assigned serial number 62001. At the time of the accident, it had accumulated 200 hours of flight time while serving as the primary development and envelope expansion (D&EE) vehicle. Two other D&EE vehicles were built as part of the original test plan. Collectively, the three D&EE vehicles had accumulated 300 hours of flight testing and 140 hours of ground testing. The accident occurred during Test number 184 (approximately the 184th flight of the test aircraft) while recording data for record 51 (the 51st test point of test flight 184).

== Flight ==
The test flight lifted off at approximately 10:38 AM Central Daylight Time, and the pre-planned sequence of tests included several simulations of one engine inoperative (OEI) scenarios, which simulated the power loss associated with the failure of one of the aircraft's two engines; each OEI simulation was accomplished through a special software mode which limited the output of both engines without shutting down any engine. Engaging the OEI mode caused the rotor rotation speed to decrease, and the flight crew responded by lowering the collective to 50% or less to restore rotor rotation speed. A rotor rotation speed of approximately 103% is required to recover under OEI conditions.

In January 2018, the US National Transportation Safety Board (NTSB) released its findings, saying that the aircraft had suffered from severe inflight vibrations, which resulted in a loss of rotor RPM, subsequent rotor flapping and rotor impact with the tailboom, causing the inflight break-up. During Record 51, which was to be the final OEI scenario of Test 184, the software dropped engine torque output from 92% to approximately 60% at 3.5 seconds into the test. This was performed at the rated not-to-exceed speed of the aircraft, 213 mph (185 kn) true airspeed; during this test the rotor rotation speed dropped to 90% by 6 seconds after the software simulated OEI. The flight crew lowered the collective to only 60%, and the rotor rotation speed never recovered above 93%. At the same time, a significant vibration at a frequency of 6 Hz was recorded in the tail rotor gearbox and tail mast. The 6 Hz vibration was initially induced by a "scissors mode" motion in the main rotor blades; in the "scissors mode", adjacent blades move closer together and apart in a scissors-like motion. The vibration caused the test pilot-in-charge to perform involuntary collective control inputs, which exacerbated the vibration. By 10 seconds into the test, the 6 Hz vibration was recorded throughout the airframe and continued to grow; the pilot's chair experienced vertical accelerations of ±3 g at 12 and 17.5 seconds into the test, with a displacement amplitude reaching ±7% of nominal position.

At 11:48 AM, approximately 20.25 seconds into the test, the main rotor red blade was flapping out-of-plane with a displacement sufficient to exceed the instrument's capacity; 0.5 seconds later, recorded airframe loads indicated the main rotor had struck the tail boom. The tail boom severed and the aircraft broke up in-flight.

== Investigation ==
Because the aircraft was a prototype, it was not required to have a working flight data recorder. However, substantial flight data were extracted from the on-board and ground-based data recorders that were monitoring the test flight. Although the cockpit voice recorder (CVR) memory was not damaged, none of the recorded audio was pertinent to the investigation as it did not appear to have been working during the test. The NTSB stated that a working CVDR would have helped to determine when the pilots first detected the severe vibration and a cockpit image recorder for test and experimental helicopters would have shown the actions they took to respond to it.

In its preliminary report, the NTSB concluded that biomechanical feedback to the collective control contributed to the aircraft's vibration. The cyclic control was equipped with a biomechanical feedback filter to prevent unintended inputs, but the collective control was not so equipped, resulting in a feedback loop which worsened the 6 Hz vibration.

In addition, the prototype 525's attitude and heading reference system (AHRS) was designed to detect and respond to uncommanded accelerations to reduce their effects, such as external buffeting from winds. Flight telemetry indicated the AHRS responded to the initial 6 Hz vibration by effectively commanding a "cyclic stir", as if the cyclic stick had been moved in a stirring motion. This also resulted in a feedback loop which exacerbated the main rotor "scissors mode" vibration. The NTSB concluded "both of [the feedback loops] occurred due to the lack of protections in the flight-control laws against the sustainment and growth of adverse feedback loops when the 6-hertz airframe vibration initiated."

== Aftermath ==
Postcrash interviews with the manufacturer test pilots and engineers indicated the vibration could have been corrected by lowering the collective or by exiting the OEI mode, either of which could have restored rotor rotation speed and eliminated the "scissors mode" vibration. The NTSB noted that existing visual alerts to low rotor rotation speed may have been affected by the severe vertical vibration; because no distinctive aural warning tone was available and the increased collective control friction may not have been detected, the crew may not have realized the rotor rotation speed was low and did not respond accordingly, concluding that "the lack of an automated safeguard in the modified one-engine-inoperative software used during flight testing to exit at a critical [rotor rotation speed] threshold" and "the lack of distinct and unambiguous cues for low [rotor rotation speed]" further contributed to the inability to maintain control.

After the accident, Bell amended the control paradigm, improving the filter on side-stick collective inputs to block transmission of stick vibrations to the rotor system. Filtering was also added to the AHRS system to account for gusts and maneuver loads. Prior to returning the 525 to flight, Bell also made the onboard voice and flight data recorder operational, recorded and archived all communication between the flight and ground crews, and installed cockpit video cameras.

In 2018, the NTSB issued a recommendation to the Flight Test Safety Committee to develop guidance for the use of cockpit voice and flight data recorders during test flights.

== See also ==
- List of accidents and incidents involving helicopters
