= 2007 Zell am See mid-air collision =

Aviation accident

Accident
- Date: 5 March 2007
- Summary: Mid-air collision due to pilot error on both aircraft
- Site: Zell am See Airport (LOWZ); Austria; 47°18′13″N 12°46′17″E
- Total fatalities: 8 (all)
- Total survivors: 0

First aircraft
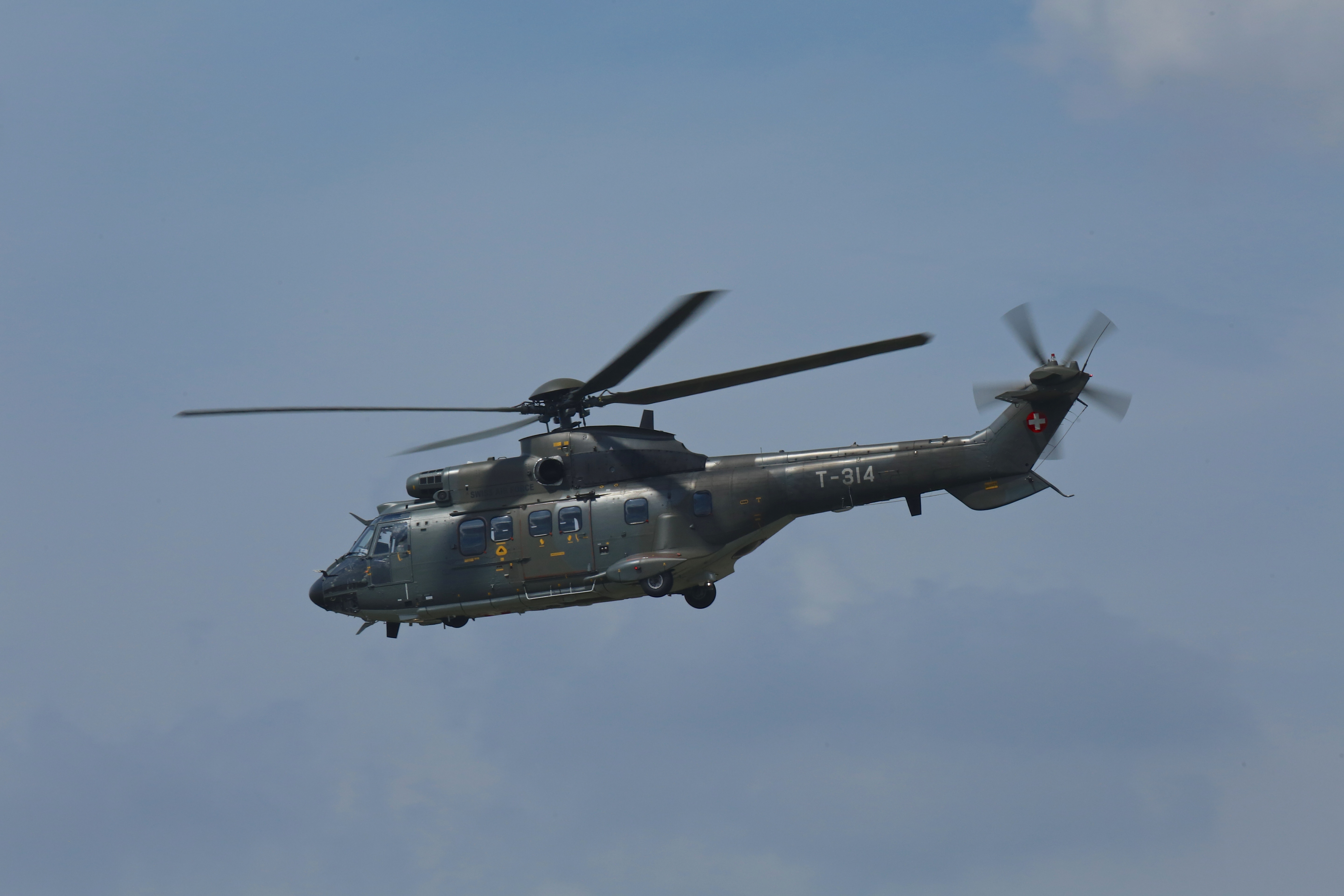
- A Super Puma similar to the one involved in the incident.
- Type: Aérospatiale SA 332 Super Puma
- Operator: Helog
- Registration: D-HLOG
- Passengers: 6
- Crew: 1
- Fatalities: 7 (all)
- Survivors: 0

Second aircraft
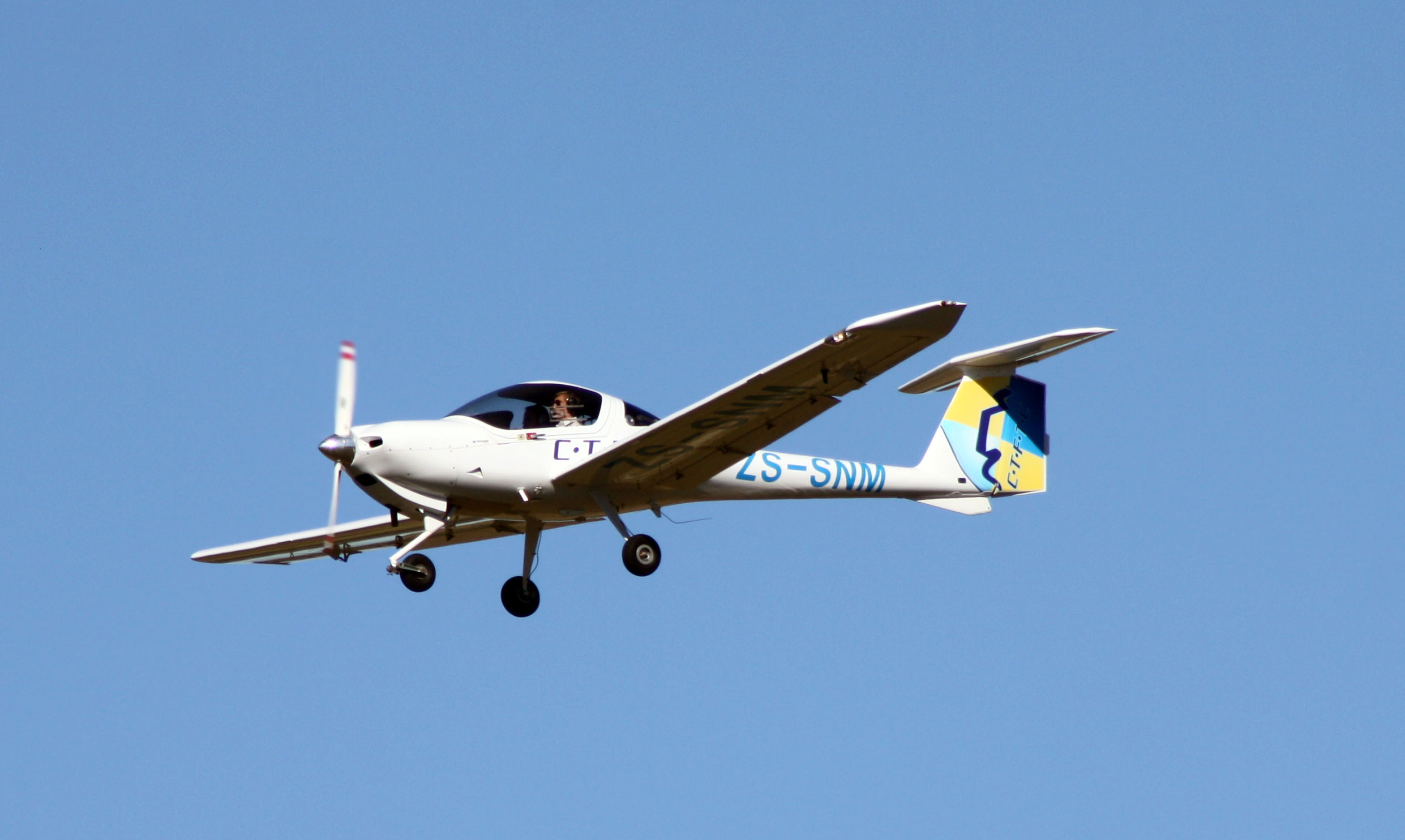
- A DV20 Katana similar to the one involved in the incident.
- Type: Diamond DV20 Katana
- Operator: Private
- Registration: OE-CEF
- Passengers: 0
- Crew: 1
- Fatalities: 1 (all)
- Survivors: 0

The 2007 Zell am See mid-air collision was an aviation accident that occurred on 5 March 2007, at 10:53 a.m. CET (09:53 UTC), in which eight people died when an Aérospatiale SA 332 Super Puma helicopter, operated by Helog, collided with a private Diamond DV20 Katana light aircraft near Zell am See, Austria.

At the time of the accident, both aircraft were operating under visual flight rules. The weather was good, with a few clouds and 50 km visibility. The collision occurred at an altitude of about 5,090 feet (1,550 m), approximately 1 nautical mile (1.9 km) north-west of Zell am See Airport, as the helicopter flew over the airport's traffic pattern travelling north-north-eastwards. At the same time, the light aircraft was climbing through the traffic pattern and was subsequently involved in a collision with the helicopter, destroying both aircraft.

The Austrian Federal Department of Aviation's Air Accident Investigation Board launched an investigation into the accident, releasing the investigation report on 9 April 2008. The report stated that the main cause of the accident was the inability of both pilots to see the other aircraft in time to avoid the collision as a result of the reduced fields of vision allowed by the cockpit designs. Another factor in the collision was the subtle limitations on visual perception relating in part to the proximity of the mountain slope not far below both aircraft, requiring both pilots' attention to maintain suitable terrain clearance.

== See also ==
- Inattentional blindness, also known as perceptual blindness, is the failure to notice a fully visible, but unexpected object because attention was engaged on another task, event, or object.
- Change blindness is a surprising perceptual phenomenon that occurs when a change in a visual stimulus is introduced and the observer does not notice it.
