= Skol Airlines Flight 9375 =

2016 aviation accident in Russia

Coordinates: 67°15′N 74°40′E

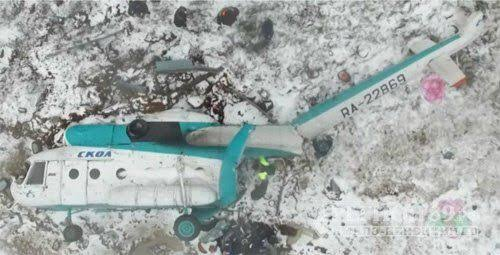
- Wreckage of RA-22869

Accident
- Date: 21 October 2016
- Summary: Spatial disorientation during emergency landing
- Site: Yamalo-Nenets, Yamal Peninsula, Siberia, Russia

Aircraft
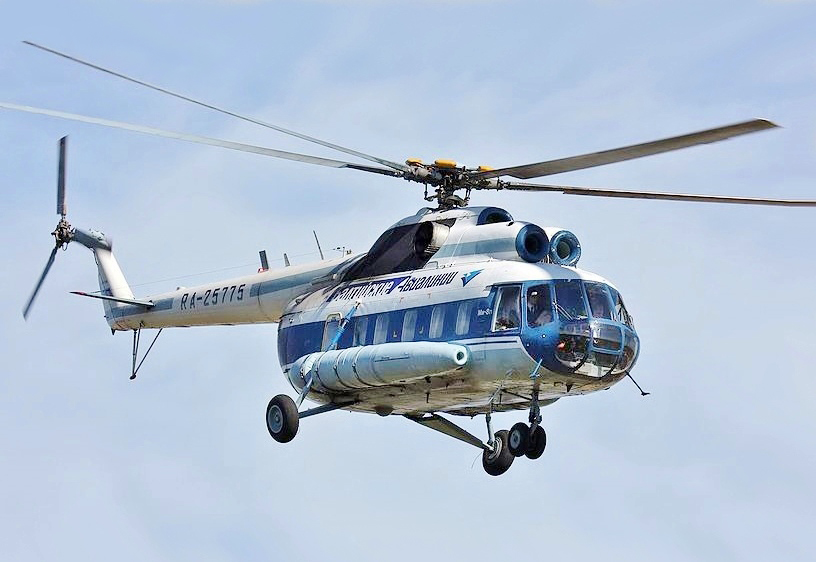
- A Mil Mi-8 similar to the one involved in the accident.
- Aircraft type: Mil Mi-8
- Operator: Skol Airlines
- Registration: RA-22869
- Flight origin: Vankor, Krasnoyarsk, Russia
- Destination: Suzumskoye oil and gas field, Staryi Urengoi, Yamalo-Nenets, Russia
- Occupants: 22
- Passengers: 19
- Crew: 3
- Fatalities: 19
- Injuries: 3
- Survivors: 3

On 21 October 2016, Skol Airlines Flight 9375 crashed in Yamalo-Nenets on the Yamal Peninsula in Siberia, Russia. Out of the 22 occupants, 19 were killed while 3 survived. The helicopter was transporting 22 passengers and crew, mainly oil and gas workers.

== Accident ==
A Mil Mi-8 helicopter was on its way to the Suzumskoye oil and gas field in Staryi Urengoi, Yamalo-Nenets from the Vankor in the Krasnoyarsk region, and was carrying mostly oil and gas workers. The helicopter crashed 45 kilometres (28 mi) northeast of its destination. It fell on its side and victims could not get out. There were three survivors, all of whom were passengers. All three crew members were killed. There were conflicting news reports, some stating that at least 19 people died, and some stating that 21 people were killed.

== Aftermath ==
Russian President Vladimir Putin expressed his condolences to the relatives of the deceased, and Yamalo-Nenets Governor Dmitry Kobylkin announced a full day of mourning and ordered that flags be flown at half-mast while cancelling entertainment events.

== Investigation ==
The final report of the Interstate Aviation Committee, released on 24 August 2017, concluded that the crash resulted from the crew becoming disorientated while attempting an emergency landing due to low fuel, at night and without light reference points.

== See also ==
- List of accidents and incidents involving helicopters
- 2016 Russian Ministry of Emergency Situations Irkutsk Il-76 crash
- 2013 Siberia Polar Airlines Mil Mi-8 crash
