= Los Angeles Airways Flight 841 =

1968 helicopter accident

Coordinates: 33.8888°N 118.1671°W

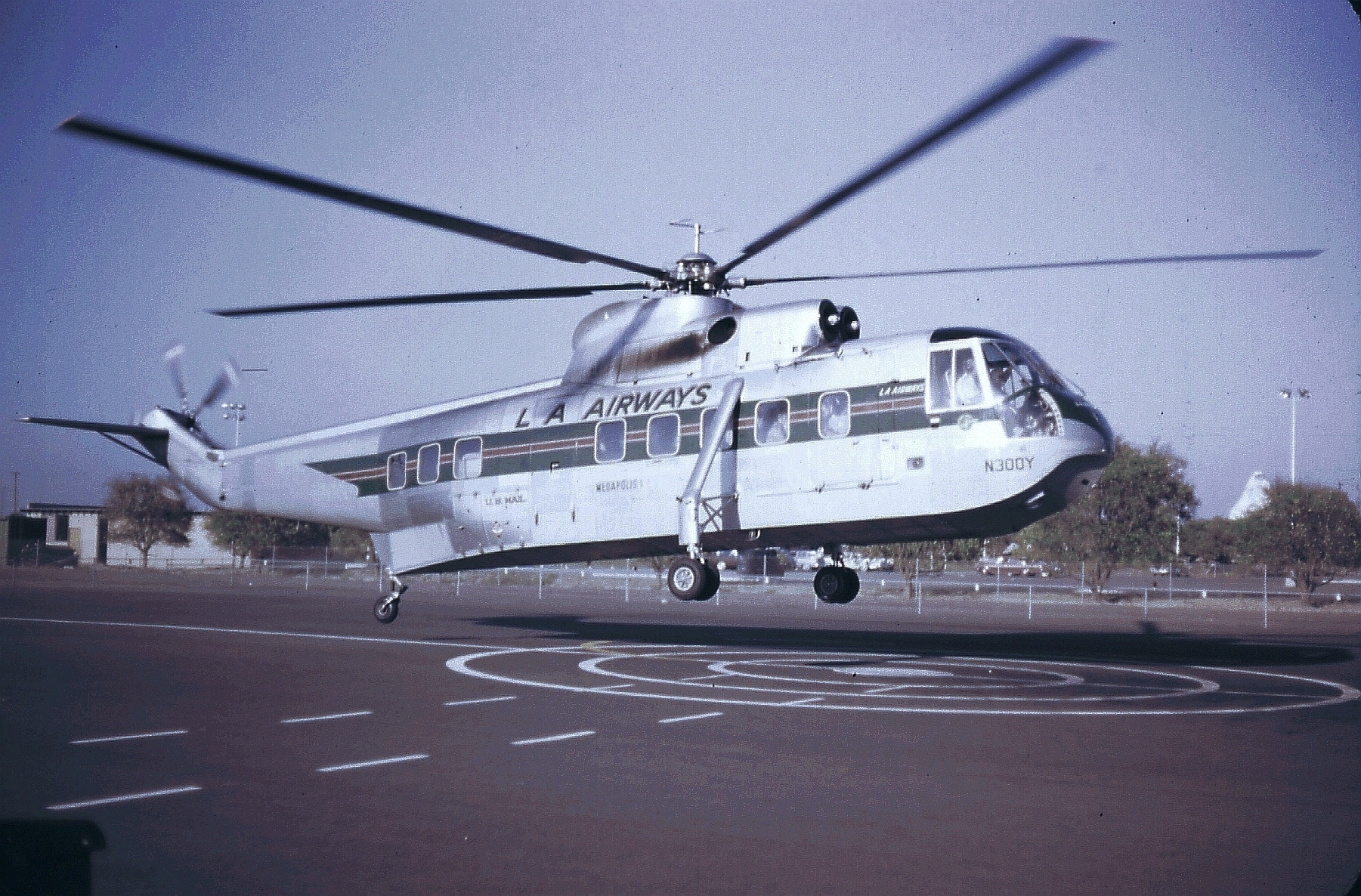
- A Los Angeles Airways Sikorsky S-61 similar to the one involved. The aircraft in the picture was the one later destroyed in the August 1968 Los Angeles Airways Flight 417 crash.

Accident
- Date: May 22, 1968
- Summary: Mechanical failure
- Site: Paramount, California, United States

Aircraft
- Aircraft type: Sikorsky 61L
- Operator: Los Angeles Airways
- Registration: N303Y
- Passengers: 20
- Crew: 3
- Fatalities: 23
- Survivors: 0

Los Angeles Airways Flight 841 was a Sikorsky S-61 helicopter that crashed at 5:50 p.m. on Wednesday, May 22, 1968, in the city of Paramount, California. All twenty passengers and three crew members were killed. The aircraft was destroyed by impact and fire. The probable cause of the accident was a mechanical failure in the blade rotor system, which then allowed one blade to strike the side of the fuselage. As a result, the other four blades were thrown out of balance. All five rotor blades then broke and the rear fuselage and tail separated from the rest of the airframe. The cause of the mechanical failure is undetermined. At the time, it was the worst helicopter-related accident in U.S. aviation history, not to be surpassed until the 1986 Grand Canyon mid-air collision which killed 25.

Los Angeles Airways (LAA) Flight 841 was a regularly scheduled passenger flight from Disneyland Heliport in Anaheim, California to Los Angeles International Airport, under visual flight rules. The flight was heading west at 2,000 feet (610 m) over Paramount, California when air traffic controllers received a distress message from pilots: "L.A., we're crashing, help us." The helicopter crashed onto a dairy farm and burst into flames. N303Y, a Sikorsky S-61L helicopter, serial number 61060, had accumulated 12,096 total flying hours prior to the accident.

Much of the debris was contained in the dairy farm where the helicopter crashed. The tail rotor was discovered one block east of the crash site in a used truck yard. The aircraft was damaged due to the impact and the fire caused by the crash.

Among those killed was a group of nine vacationers from Ohio; a Hunt-Wesson Foods executive; the mayor of Red Bluff, California; and a University of California, Berkeley professor.

== See also ==
- List of accidents and incidents involving commercial aircraft
- Los Angeles Airways Flight 417
