= Los Angeles Airways =

Helicopter airline (USA), 1947–1971

IATA	ICAO	Call sign
LX(1)	LX(1)	LOS ANGELES
- Commenced operations: 1947; 79 years ago
- Ceased operations: 1971; 55 years ago
- Hubs: Westchester, Los Angeles
- Destinations: Disneyland; Newporter Resort; Los Angeles area airports
- Headquarters: Los Angeles, California
- Key people: Clarence Belinn (president); Boyd Kesselring (operations)

Notes
- (1) IATA, ICAO codes were the same until the 1980s

Los Angeles Airways (LAA) was a helicopter airline founded in October 1947 by Clarence Belinn and based in Westchester, California, which offered service to area airports throughout Southern California.

== History ==
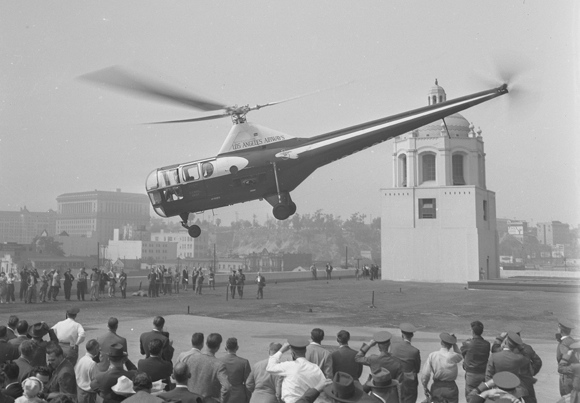
A LAA Sikorsky S-51 departs from the Terminal Annex Post office roof on its inaugural airmail flight, 1947.

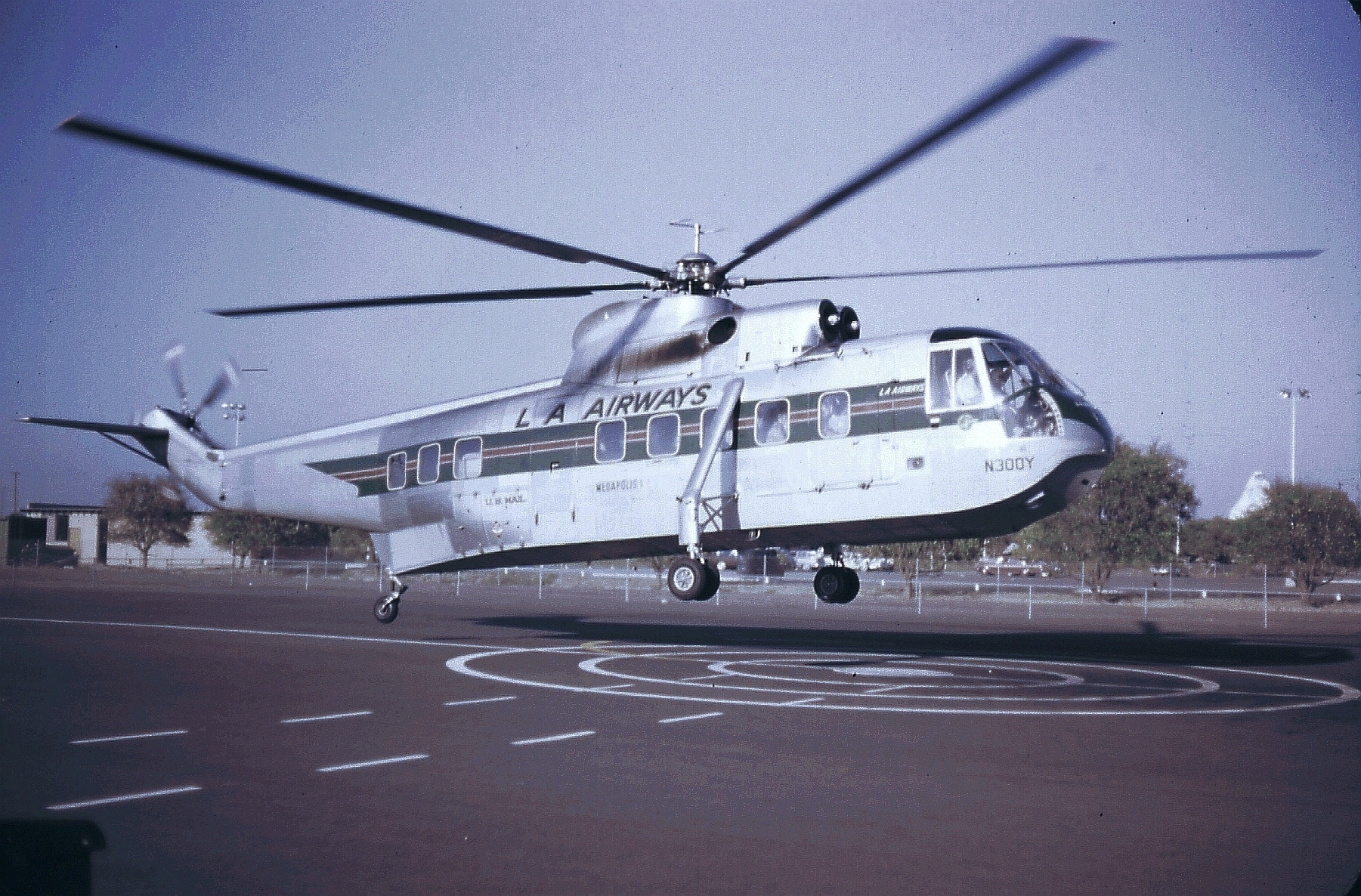
A LAA Sikorsky S-61 landing at the Disneyland Resort

Los Angeles Airways commenced airmail service on October 1, 1947, followed by scheduled passenger service in November 1954, making it the world's first scheduled helicopter airline. The main hub was Los Angeles International Airport (LAX) where passengers were flown to and from local area heliports, including Disneyland Resort in Anaheim and the Newporter Resort in Newport Beach. Service was later expanded to Ontario and San Bernardino. LAA's fleet grew with the acquisition of four Sikorsky S-61's in March 1962; the airline became the first civil operator of the type, at a purchased price of $650,000 each. On October 25, 1965, the Civil Aeronautics Board granted LAA a permanent certificate to continue scheduled passenger airline operations over the greater Los Angeles area. This, in conjunction with their authority from the Federal Aviation Administration to conduct flights under instrument flight rules (IFR), gave the company more flexibility to operate at night and in poor weather. Even though LAA was granted certification by the CAB, the CAB ended the approximately $4.3 million per year in subsidiaries for LAA, because they deemed commercial helicopter service not viable. The company considered obtaining the Sikorsky S-64 Skycrane, with detachable passenger sections, but failed to secure financing for the acquisition. In the following years the company suffered two fatal accidents, and with the failure to consummate a contract with Golden West Airlines in which it would have been purchased, Los Angeles Airways ceased operations in 1971.

=== Aircraft operated ===
- 5 Sikorsky S-51
- 7 Sikorsky S-55
- 7 Sikorsky S-61L
- 2 Sikorsky S-62A
- 4 DHC-6 Twin Otter

== Accidents ==
- In January 1949, a Sikorsky S-51 crashed off the terminal annex post office in Downtown Los Angeles, killing pilot Harry Slemmons, 27.
- On July 2, 1951, a Sikorsky S-51 crashed in an orange grove between Pomona, California and Ontario, fatally injuring pilot John De Blau, 29, and civil aeronautics inspector, Wyman Ellis Jr., 44, both of Los Angeles.
- On August 27, 1951, a Sikorsky S-51 shed main rotor blades just prior to landing at Lynwood, coming down on Lynwood Road, and killing pilot Carl D. Crew, 24, of Inglewood, California.
- On May 22, 1968, Los Angeles Airways Flight 841, operating a Sikorsky S-61L, crashed in Paramount, California resulting in the loss of 23 lives.
- On August 14, 1968, Los Angeles Airways Flight 417, crashed in Compton, California resulting in the loss of 21 lives, including the grandson of Clarence Belinn. The crash was caused due to an issue with the rotor.

== See also ==
- List of helicopter airlines
- List of defunct airlines of the United States
