= Helog =

- A HELOG Heliswiss Kaman K-Max
- Industry: Airline
- Headquarters: Bad Reichenhall, Germany
- Website: helog.de

HELOG is a former helicopter airline company based in Germany which runs training courses in Africa.

== Overview ==
According to the company's website, it is headquartered in the Bavarian town of Bad Reichenhall.

Its chief project was an academy in Liberia which trains school-leavers to maintain and repair machinery. The academy is supported by Germany's Federal Ministry of Education and Research. Helog says it has also signed an agreement with aid agency Mercy Corps to train students how to install renewable energy systems in households.

Donors include:

- HeidelbergCement,
- Labdoo, and
- Merck Group.

== History ==
In its previous incarnation, Helog operated a range of aviation services, including:

- Aerial firefighting in Germany and Switzerland, operating out of Ainring and Küssnacht.
- Humanitarian aid, disaster relief, logistics and surveillance.
- Hovercraft transport in Sierra Leone between Lungi International Airport and Freetown. Helog says that during more than 40 years of operation, it also gained experience in heavy lift and logging.

In 2009, WikiLeaks released a United Nations audit from 2007 which detailed invoices submitted by Helog. The UN disagreed about the availability of helicopters in Sudan during a $29 million peacekeeping contract. In 2010, police in Freetown became involved when a Helog helicopter was thought to have landed at a hospital without prior notice. In 2012, Helog management decided to refocus their business on training. In August 2016, Helog opened its academy in Liberia.
