= 2016 Colombian Army helicopter crash =

Aviation accident in Colombia

2016 Colombia army helicopter crash
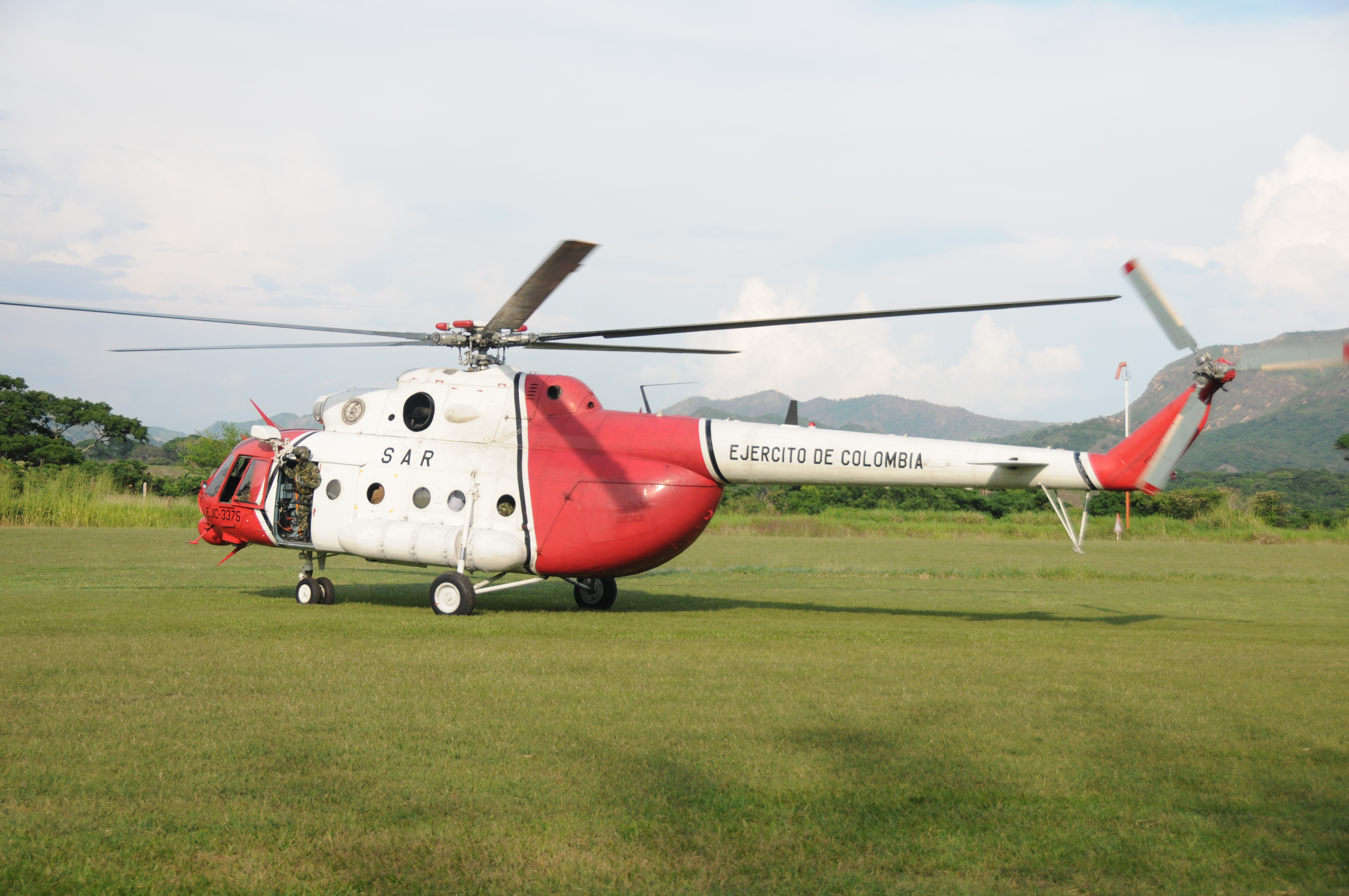
- A Mil Mi-17 of the National Army of Colombia.

Accident
- Date: 26 June 2016
- Summary: Bad weather
- Site: Pensilvania, Caldas, Colombia

Aircraft
- Aircraft type: Mil Mi-17
- Operator: National Army of Colombia
- Registration: EJC-3393
- Flight origin: Quibdo, Choco, Colombia
- Destination: Tolemaida Air Base, Tolima, Colombia
- Occupants: 17
- Passengers: 12
- Crew: 5
- Fatalities: 17
- Survivors: 0

A Mil Mi-17 of the National Army of Colombia was reported missing after taking off from the city of Quibdó on 26 June 2016. The wreckage of the helicopter was found the following day in mountainous terrain in the department of Caldas, 180 km north-west of the capital city Bogotá. It was the third helicopter crash in Colombia in 2016, and with seventeen killed was the worst accident in eleven years for the Colombian military.

== Accident ==
On 26 June, the Colombian air force took part in an offensive against the National Liberation Army (ELN) guerilla group in the department of Chocó, in the west of the country. Following the operation, the helicopter with registration number EJC-3393, took off at 2 p.m. local time from Quibdó, the capital city of the Chocó department, bound for the Tolemaida Air Base in the department of Tolima Its final report was made from a position 35 miles north of the town of Mariquita before disappearing.

Local people in the municipality of Pensilvania in the department of Caldas reported seeing the helicopter and hearing an explosion. The search team consisted of the 22 Infantry Battalion along with members of the civil defense corps, the police, the fire brigade, the Red Cross, and volunteer members of the public from Pensilvania. The wreckage was located on 27 June on a mountain side at an altitude of between 2300 and 2400 metres above sea level. Contrary to the locals' reports of an explosion, the army confirmed that no explosion appeared to have taken place, and that the helicopter appeared to have crashed directly into the mountain and broken apart on impact. All 17 people on board died in the accident.

== Investigation ==
Preliminary investigations into the cause of the accident pinpointed bad weather as the most likely cause. The head of the Colombian army, General Alberto José Mejía Ferrero, said that the helicopter had hit the mountain almost head-on and blamed poor visibility. However, he indicated that a full investigation would be carried out in order to determine the exact causes of the accident.

The accident occurred less than a year after a similar incident that killed 16 military personnel, which may have been shot down. Earlier in 2016 two other helicopters had crashed in Colombia, one killing 4 and one killing 3. Another recent crash also injured 4 people.
