= Skol Airlines =

Russian charter airline

IATA	ICAO	Call sign
—	CDV	SKOL
- Founded: 2000
- Ceased operations: 2022
- Hubs: Surgut
- Secondary hubs: Khanty-Mansiysk
- Fleet size: 35
- Headquarters: Surgut
- Website: http://www.skol.ru

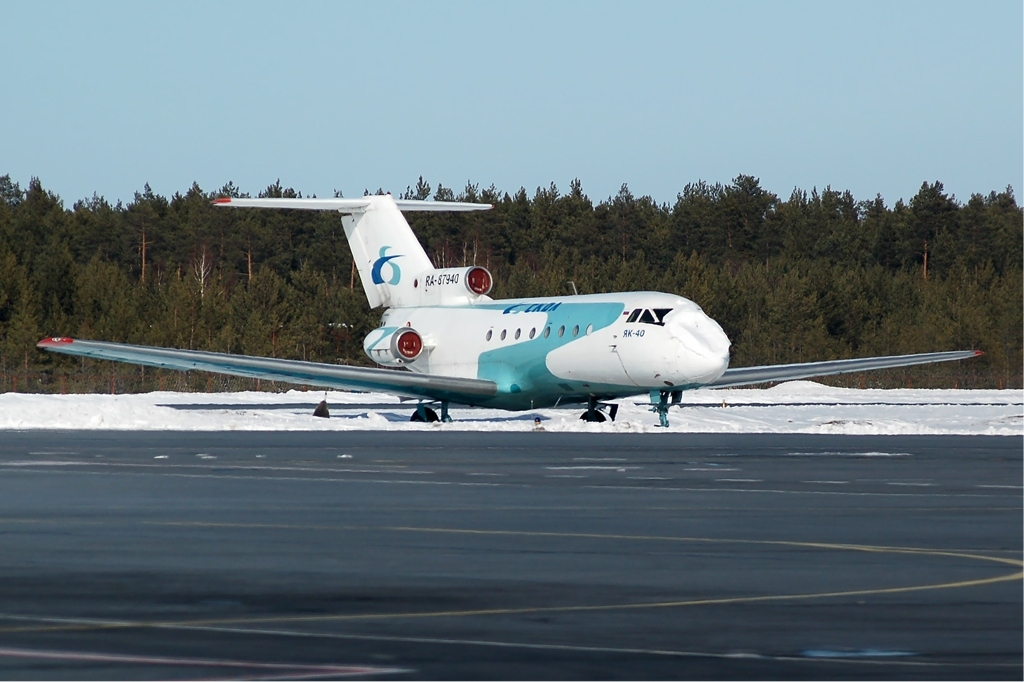
VIP Yakovlev Yak-40

Skol Airlines was a Russian charter operator providing regular passenger flights and cargo charters across Eastern and Western Siberia; its clients included Alrosa and Gazprom amongst others. The company also had its own 23 hectare heliport, the 100-room hostel on-site, dining room, Mi-8 hangar, helicopter filling station and a certified aircraft maintenance base. The company was notable for its successful efforts to curtail the 2007 Greek forest fires.

In mid-2021, Russia's Federal Air Transport Agency banned it from operating 30 helicopters and five light-engine L-410s due to debts to GTLK.

As of December 2021, the airline was banned from operating within the European Union.

The airlines' operator certificate was revoked after it went bankrupt in 2022.

The bankruptcy trustee of LLC “Airline SKOL,” Alexey Belokopyt, has announced an open auction for the debtor’s helicopters. Four aircraft will be put up for sale.

== Fleet as of 2012 ==
Aircraft type	Active	Notes
Mil Mi-8T	10	
Mil Mi-26T	7	
Mil Mi-171	5	
Mil Mi-8AMT	5	
Eurocopter AS350B3	3	
Yakovlev Yak-40	3	VIP Configuration
Cessna Caravan	3	
Let L-410 Turbolet	1	

== Accidents & Incidents ==
- On 29 November 2015, a Aérospatiale AS.350 Écureuil helicopter operated by the airline “SKOL” crashed seven kilometres from the settlement of Kedrovy in the Khanty-Mansi Autonomous Okrug. Four people were killed in the accident. The helicopter was transporting employees of the oil company “RITEK Beloyarskneft” under contract with Lukoil.
- On 21 October 2016, Skol Airlines Flight 9375, a Mi-8 helicopter with 19 passengers and a crew of 3 impacted terrain in poor weather conditions, with 19 fatalities.
