= 2017 Swan Aviation Sikorsky S-76 crash =

2017 helicopter crash in Istanbul, Turkey

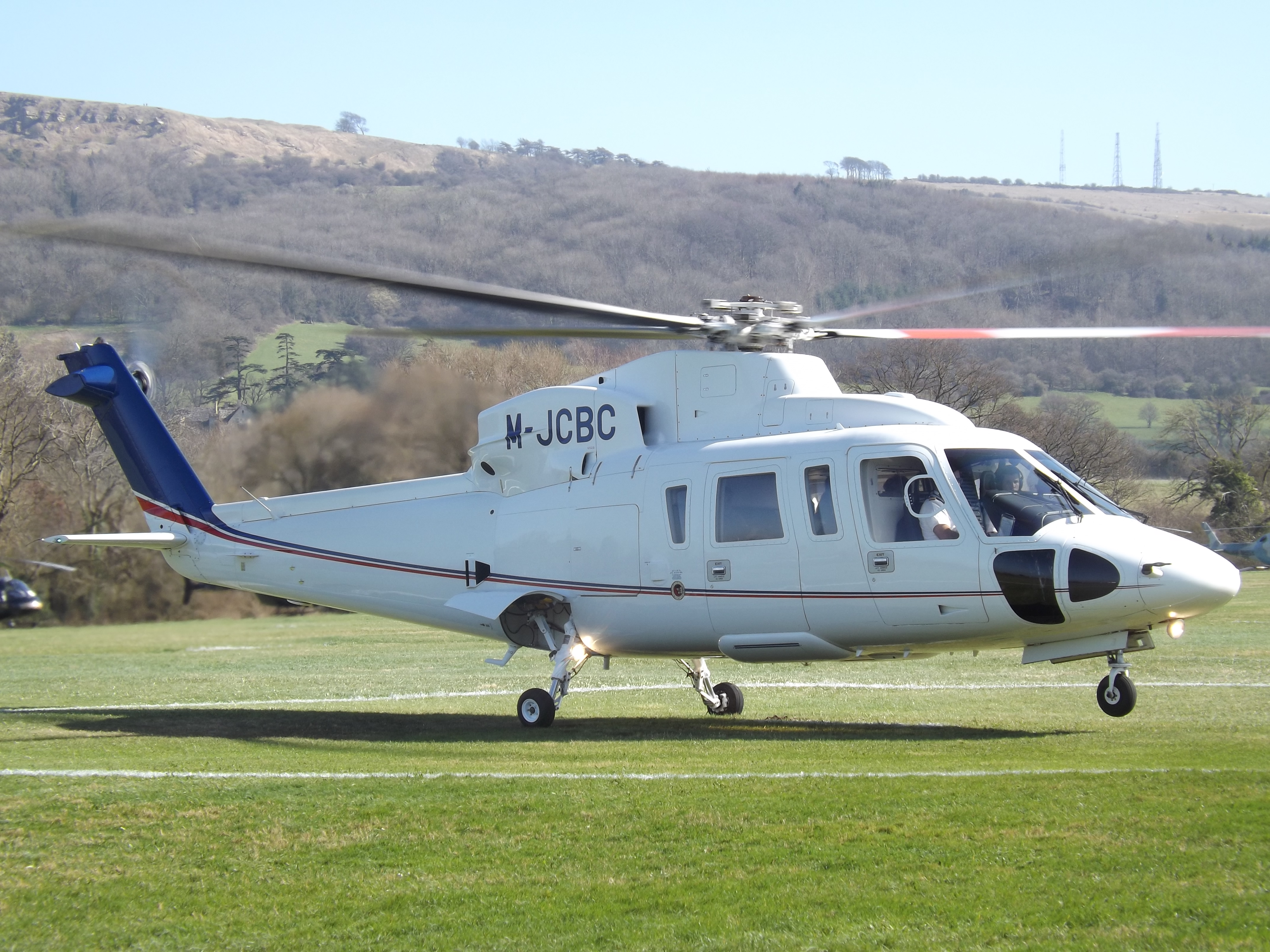
- A Sikorsky-S-76 similar to the aircraft involved

Accident
- Date: 10 March 2017
- Summary: Controlled flight into terrain
- Site: Büyükçekmece, Istanbul, Turkey; 41°01′34″N 28°37′15″E

Aircraft
- Aircraft type: Sikorsky S-76C++
- Operator: Swan Aviation
- Registration: TC-HEZ
- Flight origin: Istanbul Atatürk Airport, Turkey
- Destination: Bozüyük, Bilecik, Turkey
- Occupants: 7
- Passengers: 5
- Crew: 2
- Fatalities: 7
- Survivors: 0

On 10 March 2017, a Sikorsky S-76C++ helicopter on a private charter flight crashed in Istanbul, Turkey, killing all 7 people on board.

== Background ==
The helicopter, operated by Swan Aviation for the private use of Eczacıbaşı Holding, was scheduled to fly from Istanbul to the Bozüyük office of the company, located in northwestern Turkey.

The helicopter was carrying two pilots, a Turkish businessman from the Eczacibasi group and four Russian guests of the company for a meeting at Bozuyuk facilities scheduled at noon.

The aircraft was a Sikorsky S-76C++, with tail number TC-HEZ, manufactured in 2008.

== Crash ==
The helicopter had departed Istanbul-Atatürk Airport at 11:15 local time in heavy fog. Six minutes after the takeoff, it hit the Endem TV Tower and crashed onto the nearby State Road D100 highway. All seven people on board were killed.

== Investigation ==
In the aftermath of the crash, Directorate General of Civil Aviation informed the press that investigation was ongoing, but poor visibility conditions and the heavy fog were probably the main cause of the accident. Additionally, it was not clear why the pilots were flying near the tower, which was clearly stated on maps as "no-fly" zone and most experienced pilots were already aware of the height and location of the tower.
