= Labdoo =

Non-profit organization

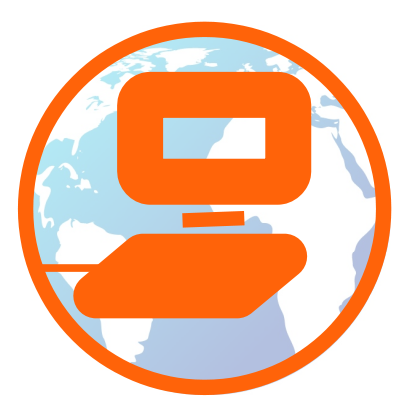
- Founded: 2010 (US), 2012 (D), 2014 (SP), 2015 (CH)
- Founders: Jordi Ros-Giralt, Wendy Lu and Calvin Shen
- Type: NGO
- Registration no.: United States; EIN: 027-3489966; Spain: 53610 – J / 1 Switzerland: CH-400.6.430.891-5; Germany: 120/5703/1940
- Location(s): Labdoo USA: Irvine Labdoo Germany: Mülheim an der Ruhr Labdoo Switzerland: Oberwil-Lieli Labdoo Spain: Provinz Barcelona
- Origins: Irvine, CA (USA)
- Region served: Worldwide
- Website: www.labdoo.org

Labdoo is a non-profit organization that provides, free of charge, refurbished laptops loaded with child-friendly educational software in local languages to schools, orphanages, and refugee projects in low-income countries around the world. The organization is dedicated to not incurring additional economic cost nor contributing to the generation of CO_{2} emissions. Through its global network of grassroots volunteers connected through more than 400 operational hubs, it has provided its services to more than 700,000 students.

== Approach ==
Labdoo's approach is based on leveraging a global volunteer social network platform, which is divided into "hubs" to carry out the work required to achieve its goal of providing children in low-income countries with computers and the opportunity to improve their digital literacy skills. The Labdoo platform allows users to engage via four types of resources.

=== Dootronics ===
"Dootronics" is what the donated used laptops or tablets are called. These devices must meet two requirements in order to be accepted for donation:

1) The device, after all the existing data is securely removed, can be repurposed and uploaded with child-friendly educational software in local languages.

2) The device can be transported via "Dootrips".

=== Dootrips ===
"Dootrips" (also called "Labdoo Trips") are contributions from individuals and organizations who, when embarking on travel, donate space in their luggage or shipments to carry the computers and laptops from the hubs to the recipient schools located in their travel destination. They claim that the Dootrips system would make it possible for these devices to be sustainably transported and delivered to the schools without incurring any additional economic cost and also without adding to CO_{2} emissions.

=== Edoovillages ===
"Edoovillages" (or "Educational Villages") are the Dootronics schools and educational spaces registered in the Labdoo platform and approved to receive the donated laptops and tablets.

=== Hubs ===
Hubs are composed of volunteers who are active in the various tasks involved in refurbishing these devices and delivering them to their destinations. This includes computer donating, collecting, sanitizing, Dootrip donations, and transportation of devices to an Edoovillage. Given that this effort is taking place globally, the Hub network model is adapted as needed to its particular location, but as part of a global collaborative community, all tasks are required to be managed in a transparent way, sharing the same volunteering principles.

== History ==
In 2004, while enrolled as a graduate student at the University of California Los Angeles (UCLA), Jordi Ros-Giralt joined the UCLA Engineers Without Borders (EWB) Chapter. His plan was to gather discarded computers from fellow students, fix it up, and then give it to a local school that needed them.. Three other classmates, Christine Lee, Michael Bruce and Charlie Fan, joined Ros-Giralt in organizing this effort. They spent the rest of the school year gathering computer donations, cleaning them, and then installing educational software. During the summer of 2005, these four traveled to the village of Antigua, Guatemala, where they set up a computer lab with 12 laptops at a local school and connected them to the Internet using a 250 kbit/s DSL connection. Following this trip to Guatemala, the four wanted to find a way to expand this effort. They developed an online collaborative tool that would allow anyone to participate in the cause of bringing educational laptops to schools. As a result, the non-profit social network Labdoo was born. The model created and strategy proposed allowed Labdoo to unlock a large pool of small volunteering resources anywhere in the world, making the project scalable and sustainable. In 2010, Labdoo.org was registered as a 501(c)(3) charity organization in Irvine, California with a board of directors composed of Jordi Ros-Giralt, Wendy Lu, and Calvin Shen.

== Funding ==
According to its charter, the Labdoo Project is operated as a zero-funding organization. A zero-funding organization is simultaneously a non-profit organization and a social business, and as such, it is self-sustainable, without any major source of monetary funding, including philanthropic donations, external investment funding, or even internal profits.

== Awards and publications ==
- In 2017, the Labdoo Project is awarded the Alan Turing Award by the Catalan Association of Electrical Engineering and Computer Science Engineers.
- In 2017, Labdoo is one of the three nominated projects in the area of sustainable development of the GreenTec Awards in 2017.
- In 2016, the German Chancellor Angela Merkel awarded the Labdoo project for its social commitment.
- In 2016, Labdoo was one of the 100 winners of the Google Impact Challenge Award in Germany.
- In 2016, Labdoo was one of the three nominated projects in the area of recycling and resources of the GreenTec Awards in 2016.
- In July 2014, an article about the Labdoo Project was published during the Humanitarian Technology Conference in Boston, United States.
- In September 2013, an article about the Labdoo Project was published during the Earth Institute International Conference on Sustainable Development Practice, in New York.
- In 2012, a chapter of the book IEEE Service-Learning in the Computer and Information Sciences was dedicated to the Labdoo Project.
