= Layang Layang Aerospace =

Charterairline of Malaysia

Layang Layang Aerospace Sdn Bhd
IATA	ICAO	Call sign
LL	LAY	LAYANG
- Founded: 1994; 32 years ago
- AOC #: AOC NO: 05
- Operating bases: Ipoh; Johor Bahru; Kota Kinabalu; Kuching; Miri; Sibu
- Alliance: Layang Layang Flying Academy
- Fleet size: 35
- Destinations: 2,000 Villages
- Parent company: Layang Layang Group
- Headquarters: Layang Layang Complex Terminal 2, KKIA Old Airport Road, Tanjung Aru, 88100 Kota Kinabalu, Sabah, Malaysia
- Key people: Hj Johan Poong Abdullah (Founder & Ground Managing Director)
- Employees: 200
- Website: www.layangaerospace.com

Layang Layang Aerospace is a regional-charter airline based in Sabah, Malaysia. It was formed to provide air services to a popular Malaysian dive site, Layang Layang Island, which is approximately 300 kilometres (190 mi) northwest of Sabah, by offering flights between Kota Kinabalu International Airport and Layang-Layang Airport. It also provides cargo services and also Emergency Medical Services (EMS).

== Overview ==
Established in 1994, Layang Layang Aerospace Sdn Bhd (LLASB) is a licensed Malaysian company providing Commercial Air Transport (CAT), approved by MAVCOM and CAAM. Specializing in Aerial Survey, Photography, Emergency Medical Services, and Flying Doctor Services, LLASB also operates the CAAM Approved Training Organization (ATO) Layang Layang Flying Academy (LLFA) in Kota Kinabalu and Ipoh. As a key partner in government contracts, LLASB is known for efficiency and trustworthiness in Malaysia's aviation sector. With offices and operating from bases throughout Malaysia, LLASB maintains a fleet of thirty-six (36) aircraft nationwide

== Incidents and accidents ==
On 8 September 2026, a Bo105 helicopter operated by Layang Layang as a Flying Doctor Service crashed at Long Lellang, killing all five people on board.

== Fleet ==
As of December 2024, Layang Layang Aerospace's fleet includes the following aircraft:

Layang Layang Aerospace fleet
Aircraft	Total	Passengers	Type
Cessna 172	5	3	Fixed-wing (Single Engine)
Piper PA-28	1	3	Fixed-wing (Single Engine)
Game GB1 Gamebird	1	1	Fixed-Wing (Single Engine)
Piper PA-34	2	4	Fixed-Wing (Twin Engine)
Britten Norman BN-2	1	8	Fixed-Wing (Twin Engine)
Nomad N22C	2	12	Fixed-Wing (Twin Engine)
Diamond DA42	1	4	Fixed-Wing (Twin Engine)
Diamond DA62	1	4	Fixed-Wing (Twin Engine)
Robinson R44	5	3	Rotary-Wing (Single Engine)
Robinson R66	1	4	Rotary-Wing (Single Engine)
Bell 206 - B3	2	4	Rotary-Wing (Single Engine)
Bell 206 - L3	1	6	Rotary-Wing (Single Engine)
Eurocopter AS350	2	5	Rotary-Wing (Single Engine)
Eurocopter AS355	3	5	Rotary-Wing (Twin Engine)
BO105	7	5	Rotary-Wing (Twin Engine)
Total Aircraft	35	-	-
