= Los Angeles Airways Flight 417 =

1968 helicopter accident

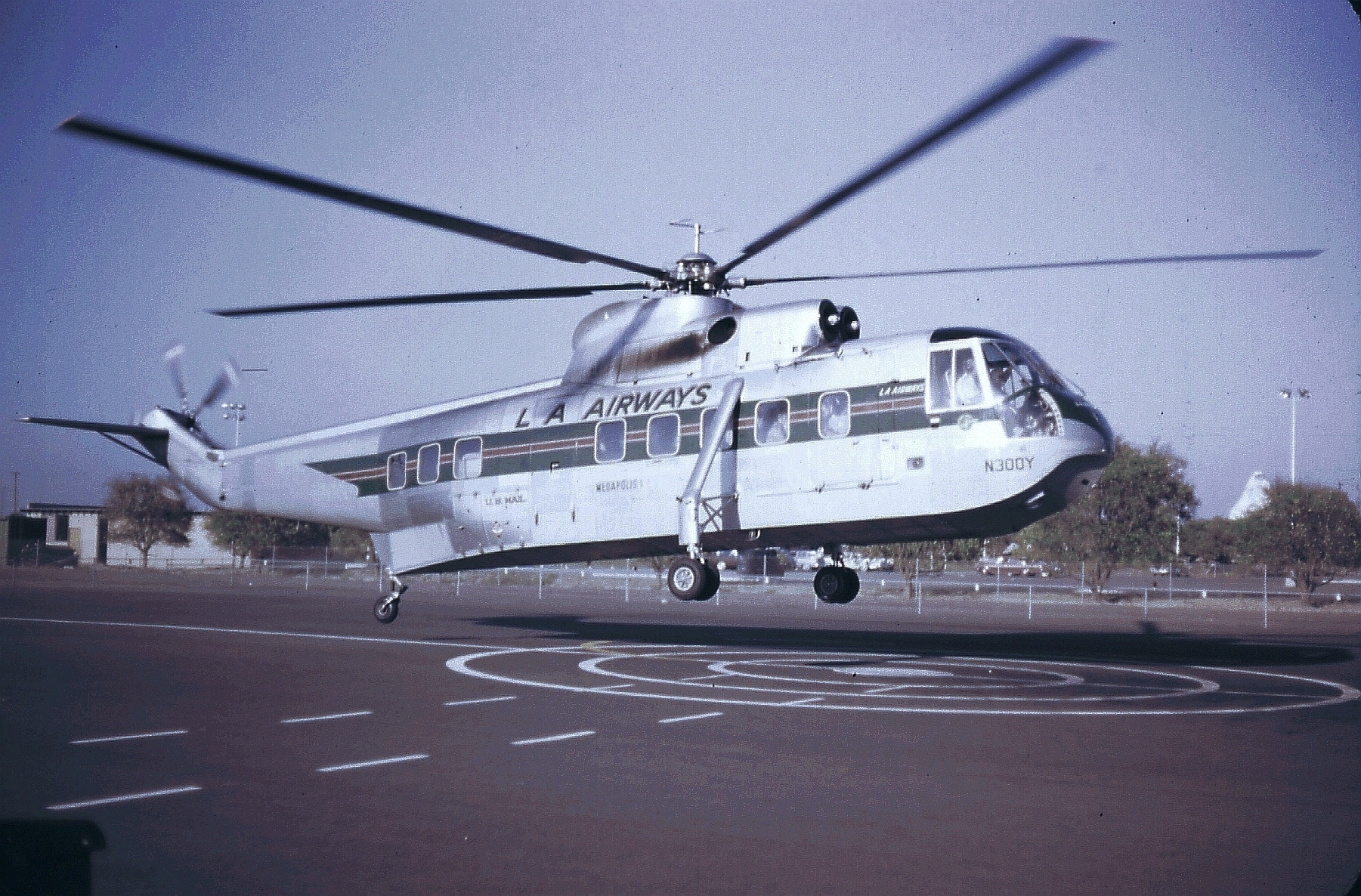
- N300Y departing the Disneyland Heliport five years prior to the accident flight

Accident
- Date: August 14, 1968
- Summary: Mechanical failure
- Site: Compton, California, United States; 33°54′N 118°12′W

Aircraft
- Aircraft type: Sikorsky 61L
- Operator: Los Angeles Airways
- Registration: N300Y
- Flight origin: Los Angeles International Airport
- Destination: Disneyland Heliport
- Passengers: 20
- Crew: 3
- Fatalities: 23
- Injuries: 0
- Survivors: 0

Los Angeles Airways Flight 417 was a Sikorsky S-61 helicopter that crashed on August 14, 1968 in the city of Compton, California. All eighteen passengers and three crew members were killed. The aircraft was destroyed by impact and fire. According to the National Transportation Safety Board the probable cause of the accident was fatigue failure. The accident happened when the arbitrarily yellow designated blade, one of five main rotor blades, separated from the spindle that attached the blade to the rotor head. Following failure, the helicopter was uncontrollable and it fell to the ground. The fatigue crack originated in an area of substandard hardness and inadequate shot peening. This was the second crash of a Los Angeles Airways helicopter operating between Los Angeles International Airport and the Anaheim Disneyland Heliport in the year 1968 (see Los Angeles Airways Flight 841).

== History ==
Los Angeles Airways (LAA) Flight 417, piloted by Captain Kenneth Lee Waggoner, former USMC helicopter pilot, was a regularly scheduled passenger flight from Los Angeles International Airport to the Disneyland Heliport in Anaheim, California. The aircraft and crew had completed three round trips to various destinations in the Greater Los Angeles Metropolitan Area beginning at 0607 PDT and departed the ramp at Los Angeles for Flight 417 at 1026. The flight, operating under Visual Flight Rules was cleared by Air traffic control to take off and proceed eastbound at 10:28:15. At 10:29:30 the flight reported to Hawthorne Tower that it was departing Los Angeles eastbound along Imperial Highway at 370 metres (1,200 ft). At 10:32:55 Air Traffic Control advised, "L.A. four seventeen, seven miles east, radar service terminated". The flight acknowledged, "Four seventeen thank you". This was the last known radio contact with the flight.

Statements were obtained from 91 witnesses. A consensus of their observations indicates that the helicopter was proceeding along a normal flightpath when a loud noise or unusual sound was heard. A main rotor blade was either observed to separate or was seen separated in the vicinity of the main rotor disc. As the helicopter fell in variously described gyrations, the tail cone either folded or separated. In order to establish an approximate altitude for the flight, several comparative flights were conducted in a similar helicopter. Most witnesses indicated the flights at 370 metres (1,200 ft) to 460 metres (1,500 ft) appeared to be most accurate.

== Wreckage ==
The aircraft crashed in Lueders Park in Compton, a recreational park located in a residential area bordering Rosecrans Avenue. The entire fuselage, both engines, main rotor head assembly, four main rotor blades, and the pylon assembly were located in the main impact area. The fifth main rotor blade (yellow) including the sleeve and part of spindle, was located approximately 400 metres (0.25 mi) north-west of the main wreckage site. Minor parts associated with this rotor blade were scattered over a three-block area northwest of the park. Examination of the yellow blade spindle (S/N AJ19) revealed a fatigue fracture in the shank of the spindle adjacent to the shoulder in the inboard end of the shank.

== Aircraft ==
N300Y, a Sikorsky S-61L helicopter, serial number 61031 was the prototype for the S-61L, and had accumulated 11,863.64 total flying hours prior to the day of the accident. It is estimated that approximately 3.17 hours were flown on August 14, 1968. The aircraft was equipped with two General Electric CT58-140-1 turboshaft engines.

The aircraft was serviced with 450 kilograms (1,000 lb) of JP-4 fuel and had a takeoff gross weight of 7,795 kilograms (17,185 lb), which was below the maximum allowable takeoff weight of 8,600 kilograms (19,000 lb). The computed centre of gravity at the time of the accident was 660.68 centimetres (260.111 in) from datum, which is 679 centimetres (267.4 in) forward of the main rotor hub centerline. The allowable limits are from 650 to 708 centimetres (256.0 to 278.7 in) for a gross weight of 7,700 kilograms (17,000 lb). The estimated gross weight at the time of the accident was 7,765 kilograms (17,118 lb).

== Findings ==
In the course of the investigation by the National Transportation Safety Board (NTSB) they made the following findings:

1. The aircraft gross weight and center of gravity were within limits.
2. The crewmembers were qualified for the flight.
3. The yellow main rotor blade separated in flight rendering the aircraft uncontrollable.
4. Blade separation was due to fatigue failure of the spindle.
5. The fatigue crack was a high-cycle, low-stress type which propagated over a long period of time.
6. The crack initiated because of a combination of the following factors:
  1. Metal hardness below specifications associated with a banded microstructure.
  2. Improper shot peening of the base metal surface.
  3. Possible detrimental effect of residual tensile stress from the plating.
  4. Pitting that may have been present in the base metal surface.
7. It is believed that the crack was present at the last Magnaglo inspection of the part, and it is not known why it was not detected.

== NTSB recommendation and FAA reaction ==
Following the initial evidence of a metal fatigue type failure, the National Transportation Safety Board recommended on August 16, 1968 to the Federal Aviation Administration:

Based on its preliminary findings in the Compton crash investigation, the Safety Board today is recommending to the Federal Aviation Administrator that he (1) require an immediate fleet inspection of all Sikorsky S-61 helicopter spindle units; (2) adopt a more precise and frequent inspection to preclude future spindle unit failures; and (3) study the need for establishing a retirement life for this vital part.

On the same date the FAA issued Emergency Airworthiness Directive 68-19-07. The directive has since been amended twice and now requires the following action:

(a) Before further flight, remove main rotor blade spindles P/Ns S6110-23325-1, S6110-23325-2, and S6112-23025-1 that either have been "salvaged" in accordance with procedures set forth in paragraph entitled "Salvage of Spindle" contained in Sikorsky Aircraft Overhaul Manual for the pertinent helicopter model, or have accumulated 3000 or more hours' time in service on the effective date of this AD, and replace with blade spindles of the same part number that have not been "salvaged" and that have less than 3000 hours' time in service.

(b) Replace main rotor blade spindles P/Ns S6110-23325-1, S6110-23325-2, and S6112-23025-1, that have not been "salvaged" and have less than 3000 hours' time in service on the effective date of this AD, before the accumulation of 3000 hours' time in service with main rotor blades spindles of the same part number that have not been "salvaged" and have less than 3000 hours' time in service.

(c) Before further flight, remove from service main rotor blade spindles P/N's S6110-23325-1, S6110-23325-2, and S6112-23025-1, serial numbers AX51, AX54, F2148, F2444, F2485, F2207, F1406, F1416, F1415, F1399, B-35, and F2451.

== See also ==
- List of accidents and incidents involving commercial aircraft
- Los Angeles Airways Flight 841
