= Flight Test Safety Committee =

The purpose of the Flight Test Safety Committee (FTSC) is to initiate and sustain a flight test related safety organization intended to promote flight safety, reduce the risk of mishap, promote risk reduction management and continually improve the flight test profession's communication and coordination.

== History ==
The Flight Test Safety Committee (FTSC) was formed in November 1994 by members of the Society of Experimental Test Pilots (SETP), the Society of Flight Test Engineers (SFTE) and the American Institute of Aeronautics and Astronautics (AIAA). Several other additional organizations presently comprise the FTSC.

== Mission statement ==
- To foster an interchange of information related to "flight test lessons learned", in order to reduce potential mishaps.
- To promote an atmosphere of sharing "lessons learned" and "best practices" for risk reduction management.
- To direct the effort of flight test safety through education.
- To gather information to compile the database to accomplish the goals of the charter.
- To assimilate the information in a user-friendly computer based system, provide worldwide access and update the database as information becomes available.
- To ensure that the data collected, used and distributed from this effort does not reflect upon the prior actions, incidents or accidents of the members or associated organizations.
