= 2013 Berlin helicopter crash =

Aviation accident in Berlin, Germany

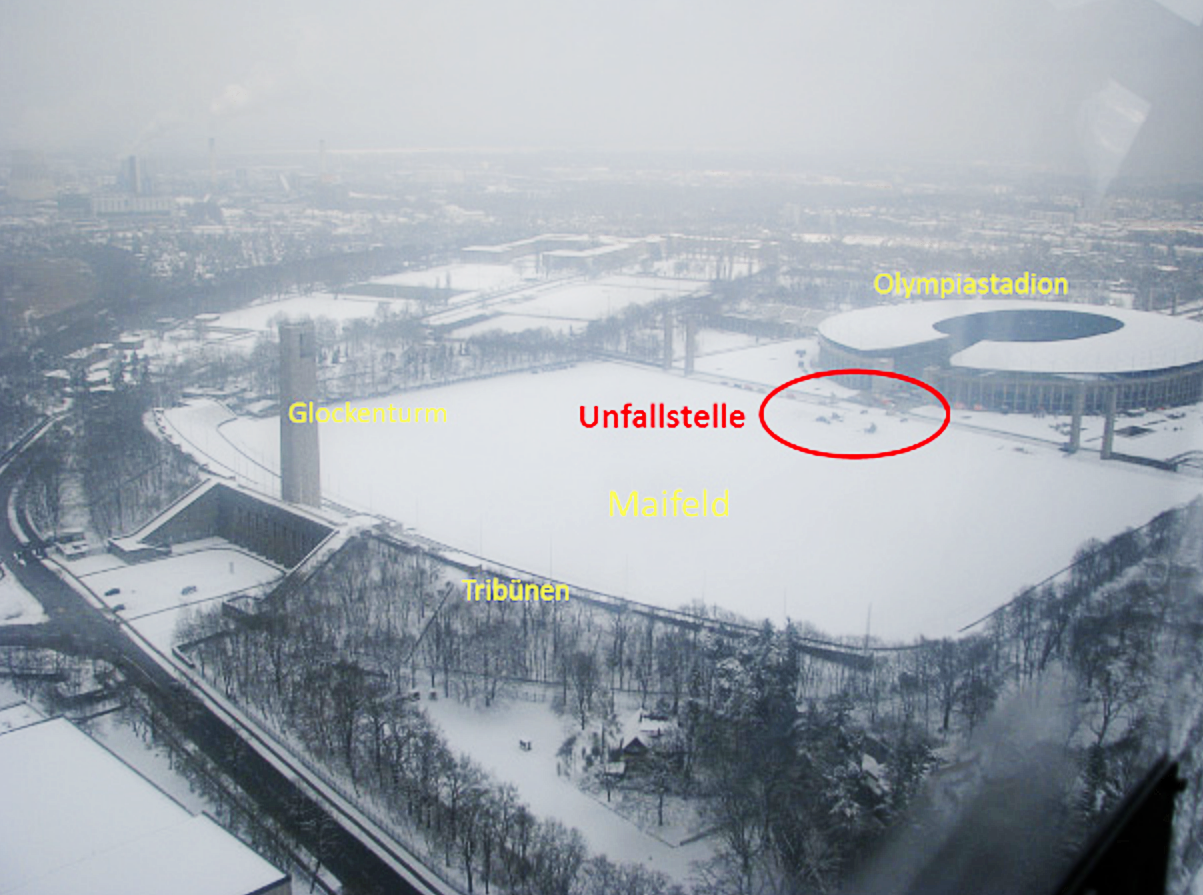
- The scene of the accident (circled in red) next to Berlin Olympic Stadium

Accident
- Date: 21 March 2013
- Summary: Ground collision on landing in whiteout conditions
- Site: Olympic Stadium, Berlin, Germany; 52.513492°N 13.23614°E
- Total fatalities: 1
- Total injuries: 9
- Total survivors: 24

First aircraft
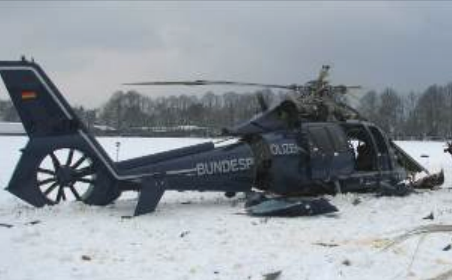
- D-HLTM, the first aircraft involved, photographed after the collision
- Type: Eurocopter EC155
- Operator: German Federal Police
- Registration: D-HLTM
- Occupants: 10
- Passengers: 8
- Crew: 2
- Fatalities: 1
- Injuries: 3
- Survivors: 9

Second aircraft
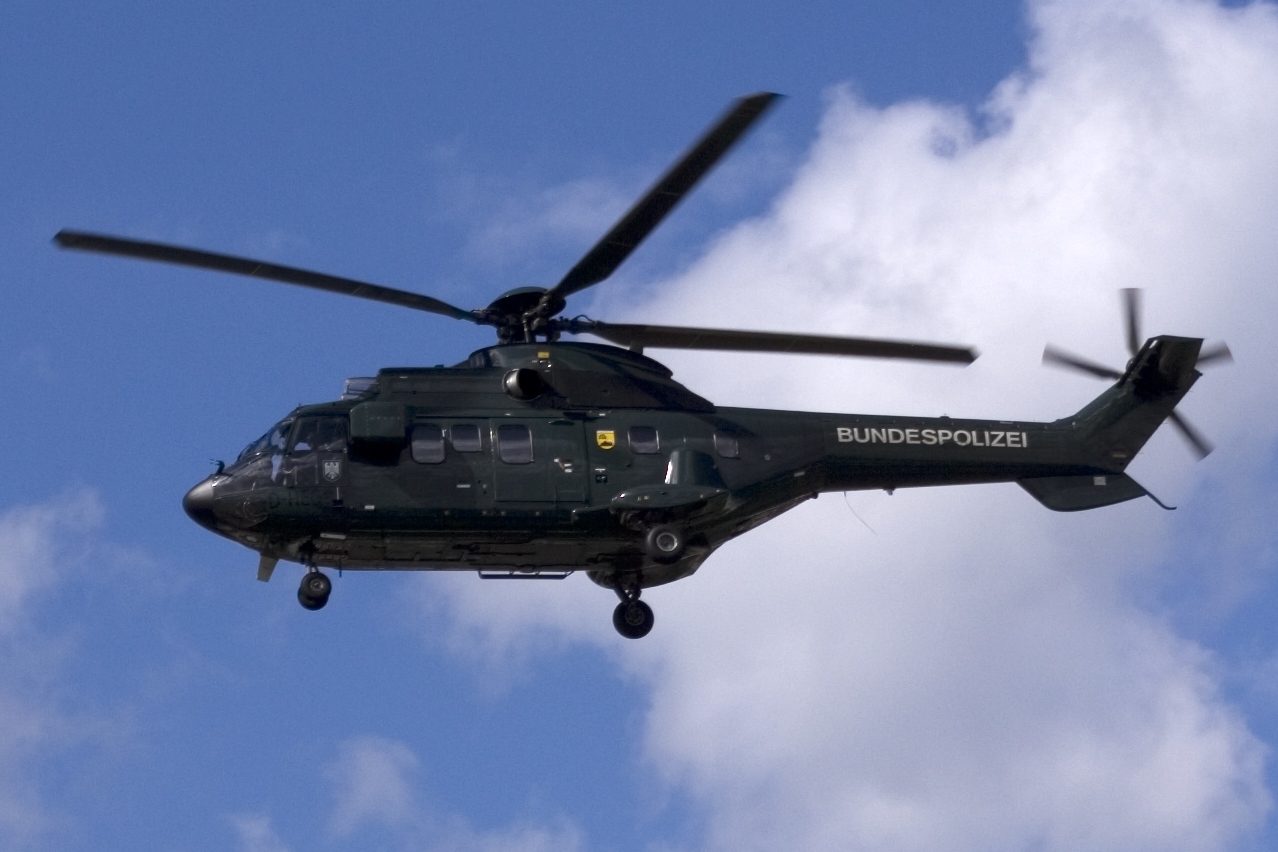
- D-HEGB, the second aircraft involved, photographed in 2007
- Type: Eurocopter AS332 Super Puma
- Operator: German Federal Police
- Registration: D-HEGB
- Occupants: 15
- Passengers: 13
- Crew: 2
- Fatalities: 0
- Injuries: 1
- Survivors: 15

Ground casualties
- Ground injuries: 5

On 21 March 2013, two helicopters of the German Federal Police collided while landing in front of Berlin Olympic Stadium, Germany, in whiteout conditions. One crew member was killed and nine other people, both on board the helicopters and on the ground, were injured.

== Background ==
During a large police exercise against football hooliganism on 21 March 2013 at the Olympic Stadium of Berlin, three helicopters of the federal German police force were scheduled to land on the Maifeld sports field in front of the stadium. Their task was the delivery of reinforcements for police at the nearby railway station. The flight comprised two Eurocopter AS332 Super Pumas and one Eurocopter EC 155.

=== Meteorological conditions ===
Visibility of 1,800 metres (5,900 ft) had been reported at 10:20 a.m. from Tegel Airport, three nautical miles from the stadium. Cloud coverage was broken with winds of 5 knots (9.3 km/h; 5.8 mph) from 310 degrees. Air temperature was −1 °C (30 °F), air pressure was 1015 hPa. Investigators measured a layer of snow of 17 centimetres (6.7 in) outside the crash site. During the morning, the air temperature had further decreased, so that the old snow cover was frozen with fresh snow lying on top. The total snow thickness at the crash site was recorded as 15 centimetres (5.9 in).

== Accident ==
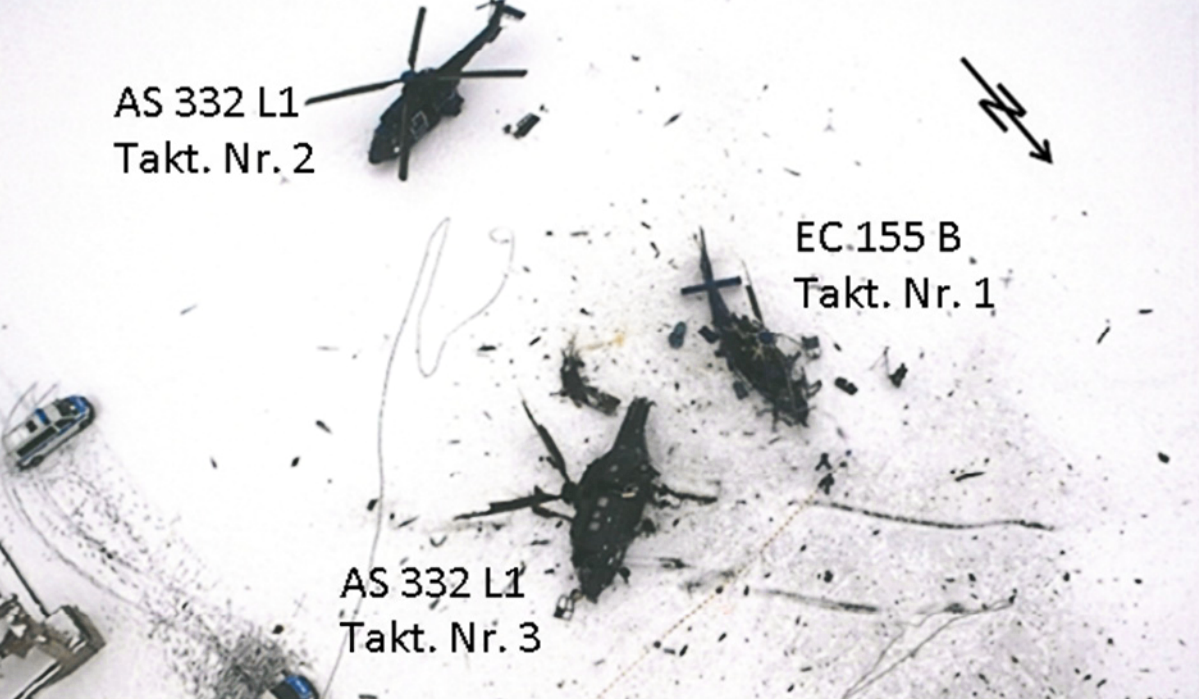
Aerial view of the crash site with annotations referring to the tactical numbers and types of the involved aircraft

The final investigation report describes the event as follows: The first aircraft, an EC 155, landed successfully around 10:28 CET but raised large amounts of snow from the ground. This helicopter carried the pilot, an engineer, seven police officers, and one journalist. It was followed by the Super Puma, which approached the landing zone at a steep angle and hovered back and forth above the ground for about 30 seconds, raising ever more snow that fully engulfed the first helicopter. During this manoeuvre, the third helicopter, also a Super Puma, approached the landing zone, carrying the pilot, an engineer, and 13 officers. This third aircraft also raised a large cloud of snow from the ground while landing, causing the pilot to lose sight of the marshalling officer on the ground. The third helicopter then touched the ground which caused the aircraft to roll over. Thereby its main rotor and tail section collided with the EC155's main rotor. The pilot of the EC155 was killed by a piece of rotor blade. Apart from a landing report made by helicopter number one and a brief report on changing positions during the landing approach of aircraft number two and three, no radio communication took place between the three aircraft during the entire landing phase.

Helicopter No. 1 (EC 155) was equipped with a cockpit voice recorder and a flight data recorder. The crashed Super Puma was equipped with a cockpit voice recorder but did not carry a flight data recorder since that was not a legal requirement when the type was first certified in 1989. Voice recorder data did not indicate any warnings about potential technical problems during the landing approach.

== Reactions ==
After the disaster, the police exercise was criticised by members of the state parliament of Berlin. Delegates of Alliance '90/The Greens and The Left questioned the use of helicopters during the bad weather conditions on the day of the exercise, and called the training scenario "unrealistic" and "disproportionate". Members of the Federal Police and politicians of the SPD and CDU stated that such exercises were useful, since real missions still have to be carried out in bad weather. The Greens and The Left also announced that they would debate the topic in the interior committee of the state parliament.

Hans-Peter Friedrich, Federal Minister of the Interior, and Berlin senator of the interior Frank Henkel visited the site of the crash on 21 March and offered their condolences to the victims and their families. Chancellor Angela Merkel announced her commiserations via her press officer Steffen Seibert.

Wolfgang Bosbach, head of the interior commission of the parliament of Germany, announced that the helicopter crash would be added to the list of subjects in a planned debate about the future structure of the federal police forces.

== Investigation ==
The German Federal Bureau of Aircraft Accidents Investigation and federal attorneys investigated the accident, and a special homicide commission was routinely established at the Berlin State Office of Criminal Investigation. In the night of 22 March, the wrecked aircraft were hauled to a police facility in Ruhleben. A post-mortem examination of the dead pilot concluded that he had obviously been killed by extraneous causes resulting from the crash. Following these findings, the special homicide commission was dissolved.

A first report by the Federal Bureau of Aircraft Accidents Investigation was published in May 2013. It listed the known facts of the accident without identifying a cause. The cause of the accident was still unclear as of September 2013.

=== Final report and criticism ===
The final investigation report was published in September 2014. The investigators stated that all pilots had ample flying experience including landings in snow, dust and sand. The pilot of helicopter No. 2 had also been flying search-and-rescue missions in mountainous areas so he was familiar with landing on unprepared snowy ground.

According to the investigation, a number of circumstances led to the fatal crash: the federal police aviation did not have any distinctive procedure for landings on snowy ground, the distances between the three individual aircraft during the landing phase had been too small, and communication between the personnel involved in the landing operation had been too scarce. The final investigation report also criticised that while the German federal police helicopter squadron was the nation's biggest non-military helicopter operator, it was not bound to the legal framework of similar civilian aviation companies. Notably European Union directive No. 216/2008 was criticised for exempting police aviation from such legal control. Also safety recommendations for police helicopter aviation issued by the Federal Bureau of Aircraft Accidents Investigation to the federal ministry of transport in 2006 had not been legally implemented.

The president of the German federal police rejected the report and claimed that own investigations had shown different results. The distance between the aircraft had been sufficient, and the communication had been reduced to a minimum according to the planned mission. Police pilots unofficially criticised the chief investigator who is a military pilot and had allegedly used inapplicable standards for the investigation. A motion to disqualify the investigator was however rejected.

== Aftermath ==
Following the crash, the federal police introduced special training units and new rules for helicopter landings in snow. In February 2017, it was reported that NATO was prompted by the 2013 Olympiastadion crash to initiate a multinational trials campaign for new technologies in low-visibility helicopter flights.
