= Game Composites GB1 GameBird =

British aerobatic aircraft

GB1 GameBird

General information
- Type: Two-seat aerobatic monoplane
- National origin: United Kingdom
- Manufacturer: Game Composites
- Designer: Philipp Steinbach
- Number built: at least 107

History
- First flight: 15 July 2015

The Game Composites GB1 GameBird is a British single-engine, two-seat, aerobatic aircraft that was designed by Philipp Steinbach and the first prototype was built by Game Composites.

Steinbach is a German aircraft designer, but not an aeronautical engineer, so he enlisted the aid of two engineers, Jing Dai and Robert Finney, to complete the design. The design work was done in the United Kingdom under Game Composites Limited of London. The aircraft is built under licence by Game Composites LLC in Bentonville, Arkansas, United States.

== Design and development ==
The GameBird is a composite structure tandem two-seat, low-wing, cantilever monoplane powered by a 303 horsepower (226 kW) Lycoming AEIO-580-B1A piston engine. The GameBird has a fixed conventional landing gear with a steerable tailwheel.

The prototype GameBird first flew on 15 July 2015.

The GameBird was certified by European Aviation Safety Agency in the CS-23 Aerobatic category on 12 April 2017 and by the US Federal Aviation Administration under FAR 23 on 29 August 2017. Game Composites received a production certificate from the FAA in June, 2019.

As of 27 September 2026, there were 115 GB1 aircraft registered in the US.

== Operators ==
=== Civilian ===
- UAE (United Arab Emirates)
  - Emirates Flight Training Academy (2)
- Malaysia ** Layang-Layang Flying Academy

=== Military ===
Peru

- Peruvian Air Force

Escruadilla Acrobática Bicolor

Chile

- Chilean Air Force

Escuadrilla de Alta Acrobacia Halcones

United States

- United States Air Force

United States Air Force Academy – Designated T-19A Kestrel in US service.

== Specifications ==
Data from European Aviation Safety Agency, Federal Aviation Administration, Flying.

General characteristics

- Length: 6.9 m (22 ft 8 in)
- Wingspan: 7.7 m (25 ft 3 in)
- Height: 2.56 m (8 ft 5 in)
- Wing area: 11.3 m^{2} (122 sq ft)
- Gross weight: 998 kg (2,200 lb)
- Fuel capacity: 311 litres (68 imp gal; 82 US gal)
- Powerplant: 1 × Lycoming AEIO-580-B1A horizontally opposed, six-cylinder aircraft engine, 226 kW (303 hp)
- Propellers: 4-bladed MT-Propeller MTV-14-B-C/C190-130, 1.9 m (6 ft 3 in) diameter clockwise rotation

Performance

- Cruise speed: 370 km/h (230 mph, 200 kn)
- Stall speed: 102 km/h (63 mph, 55 kn)
- Never exceed speed: 433 km/h (269 mph, 234 kn)
- Range: 1,900 km (1,200 mi, 1,000 nmi)
- Service ceiling: 4,572 m (15,000 ft)
- g limits: +/- 10g

== See also ==
Aircraft of comparable role, configuration, and era

- Extra 300
- Mudry CAP 230
- MX Aircraft MX2
- Corvus Racer 540
- XtremeAir Sbach 342 (XA 42)
- Zivko Edge 540
- Zlín Z-50
