= Zell am See Airport =

Zell am See Airport Flugplatz Zell am See
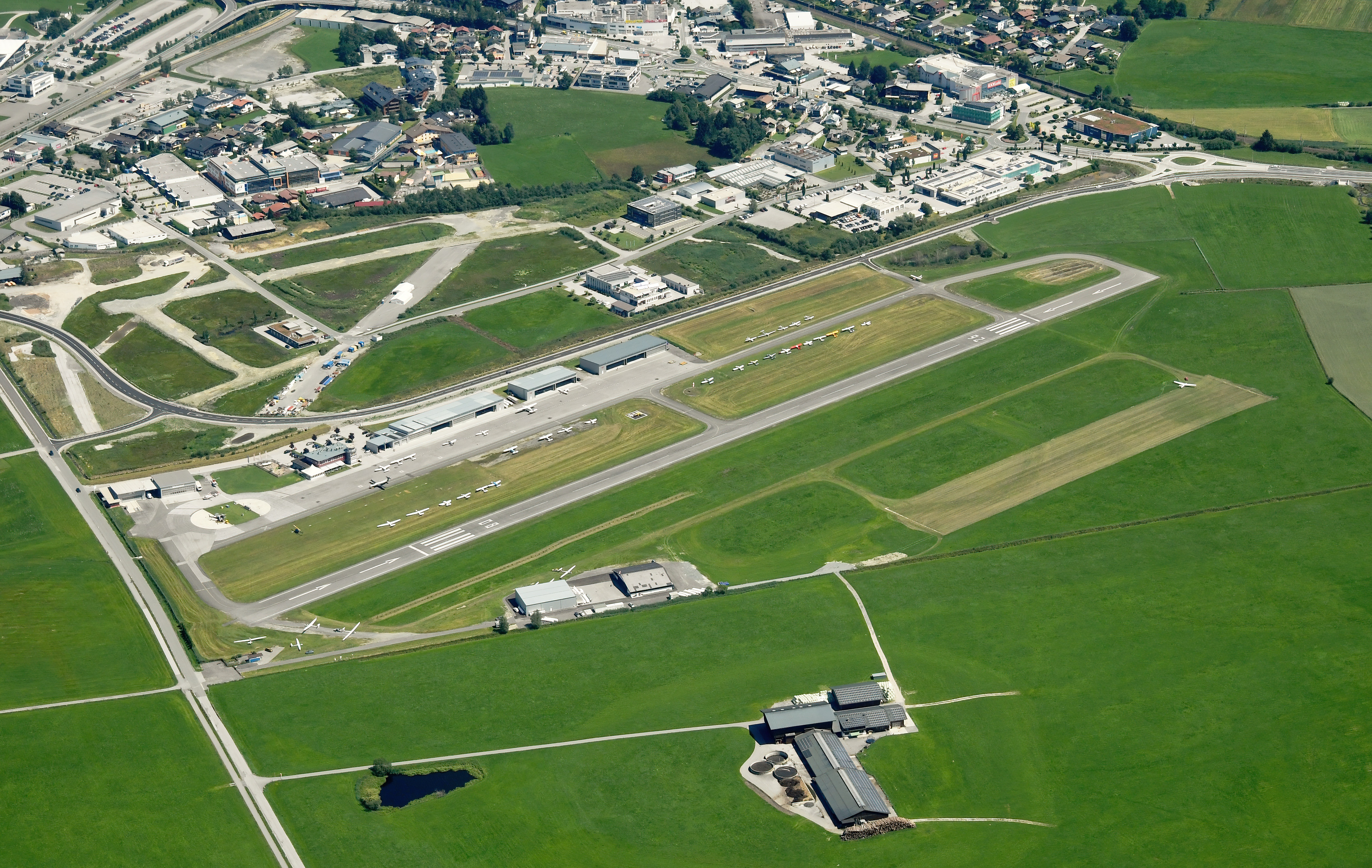
- IATA: QOZ; ICAO: LOWZ

Summary
- Airport type: Public
- Operator: Flugplatz Zell am See Betriebsgesellschaft m.b.H.
- Serves: Zell am See
- Location: Austria
- Elevation AMSL: 2,474 ft / 754 m
- Coordinates: 47°17′29.1″N 012°47′24.3″E

Map
- Location of Zell am See Airport in Austria

Runways
Direction	Length		Surface
Direction	ft	m	Surface
08/26	2,180	664	Asphalt
08C/26C	2,040	622	Grass
08R/26L	970	296	Grass
- Source: Landings.com

Zell am See Airport (German: Flugplatz Zell am See, IATA: QOZ ICAO: LOWZ) is a public use airport located 4 kilometres (2 mi) south of Zell am See, Salzburg, Austria. The airport is usable for airplanes up to 5.7 tonnes.

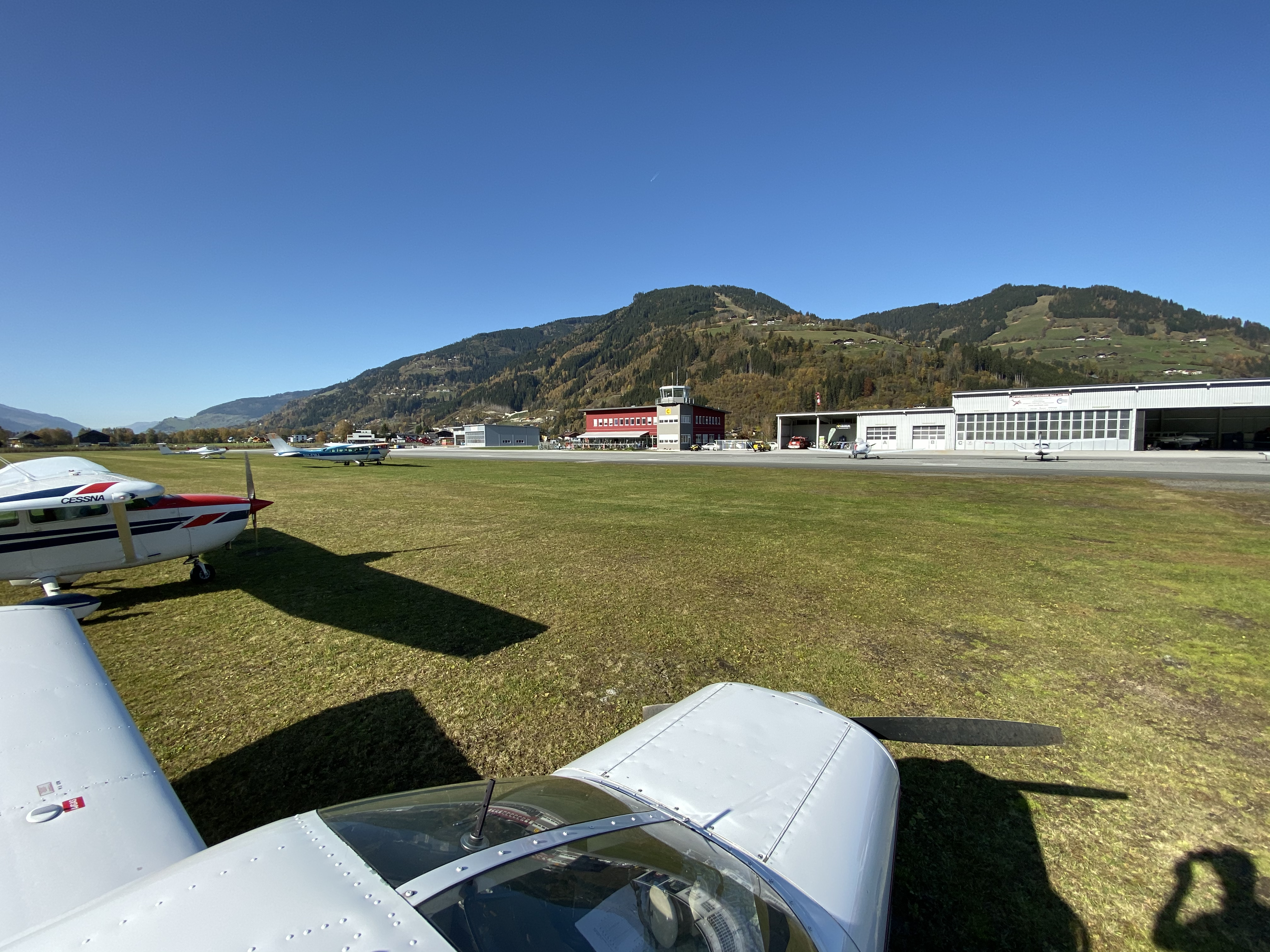
Zell am See Airport

== See also ==
- List of airports in Austria
