= 2015 Colombia helicopter crash =

Helicopter crash in Colombia

Coordinates: 4°N 72°W

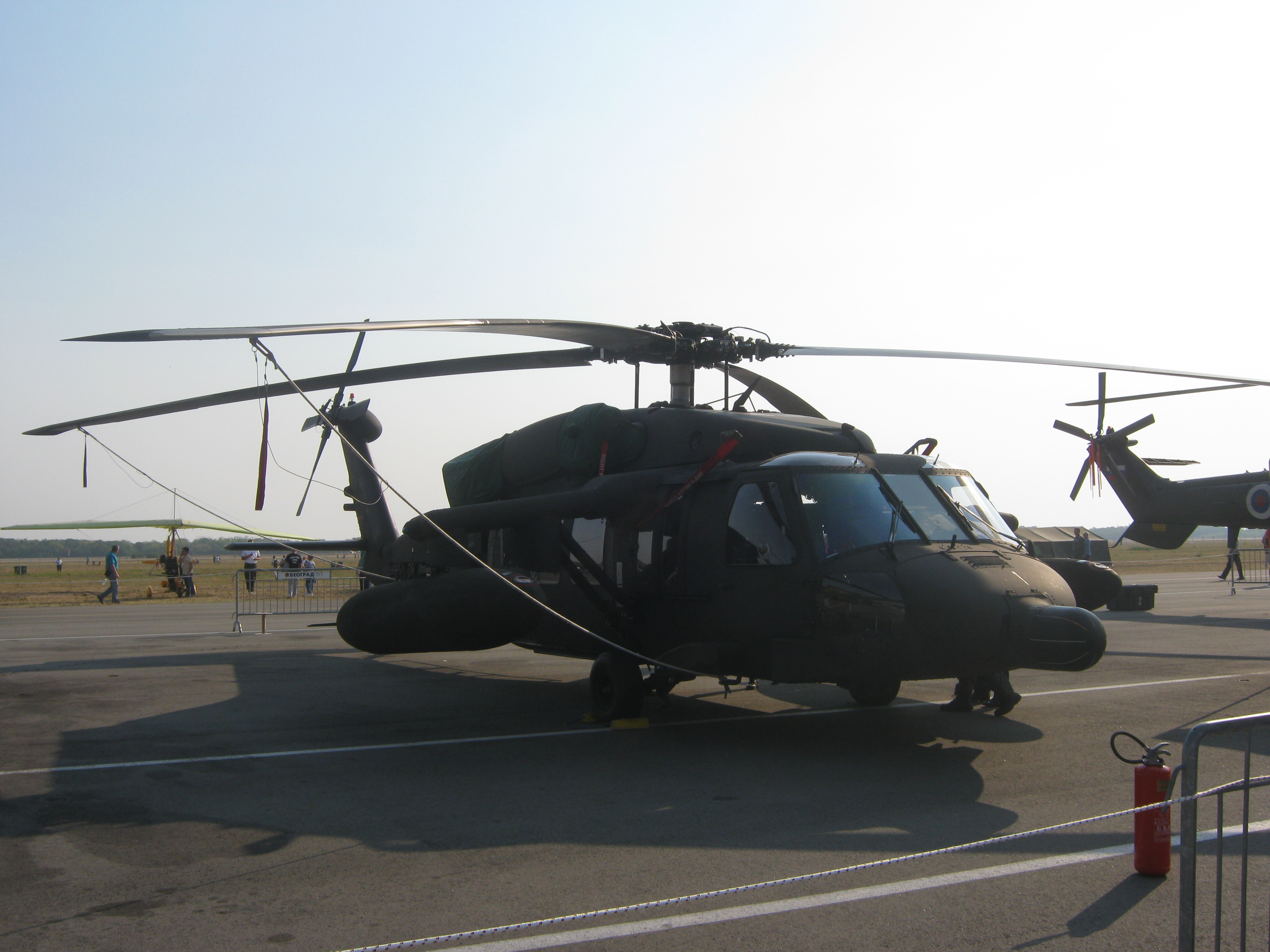
- A UH-60 Black Hawk similar to the helicopter involved in the crash

Accident
- Date: 4 August 2015
- Summary: Possible shootdown
- Site: Cesar Department, Colombia

Aircraft
- Aircraft type: UH-60 Black Hawk
- Occupants: 18
- Fatalities: 16
- Injuries: 2
- Survivors: 2

On August 4, 2015, 16 policemen died in a helicopter accident in northwestern Colombia. The Colombian Defense Minister, Luis Carlos Villegas Echeverri, stated that the crash was most likely caused by bad weather.

The flight was part of an operation against Clan Úsuga, a criminal organization composed of former right-wing paramilitary group members. Two other helicopters flew on the same mission but did not encounter difficulties and did not hear any hostile fire.

== Aftermath ==
The helicopter crash happened 4 days after a Colombian Air Force CASA/IPTN CN-235 transport airplane crashed in Cesar Department, killing all 11 service members aboard. So far in 2015, 35 members of the military or police have been killed in 5 separate accidents involving aircraft. The spate of casualties have led to questions about the efficacy of the military's air operations procedures. A debate was organized in the Congress of Colombia to discuss the accidents, and the Defense Minister and Air Force Commander were called upon to testify. An investigation found that the helicopter may have been shot down.
