= Flying Doctors of Malaysia =

Service of the Malaysian government

Flying Doctors of Malaysia is conducted under the Ministry of Health with transport provided by the Royal Malaysian Air Force.

This service is offered to natives who live deep in the jungle and cannot be contacted via other routes. The service is limited to areas that have landing zones.

In West Malaysia, the service is provided by the Maternal and Child clinics (KKIA), consisting of static and mobile. Static KKIA service is provided in the Hospital JHEOA, Gombak whereas mobile KKIA service is provided by the various interior medical posts which is under the control of JHEOA.

The districts involving the mobile KKIA services include: Pahang district - Kuala Lipis - Lenjang Post, (Landing Zone) LZ Titom, LZ Kendrong and LZ Cerong. Service is provided by the Air Doctor Service with the Helicopter support form TUDM. Kelantan district - Gua Musang Districts- P1 district- service is provided by the Air Doctor Services with assistance from TUDM. Services provided to the P2 District by 4WD vehicles.

In Sarawak, there are 12 teams of Air Land force (pasukan Darat Udara - PDU) that serve 159 locations. In 2006, the federal government spent an estimated RM 5.1 million a year in Sarawak alone for Flying Doctors services.

In Sabah there are two teams of Air Land force (pasukan PDU) that serve 41 locations and villages.

Recent reductions in flying doctors service have drawn flack from members of Parliament representative who question why Malaysian government should reduce such vital services.
