= Bell UH-1 Iroquois in Salvadoran service =

A Salvadoran Air Force UH-1H during a flight demonstration in Soyapango, 2026

The Bell UH-1 Iroquois, a utility military helicopter manufactured in the United States, has been in service with the Armed Forces of El Salvador (FAES) since at latest 1976. The UH-1 saw extensive service in the Salvadoran Air Force (FAS) during the country's civil war (1979–1992). Among notable civil war incidents involving the UH-1 include the a raid of the Ilopango Air Base where the Farabundo Martí National Liberation Front (FMLN) destroyed 6 UH-1H helicopters and a 1984 FMLN bombing of a UH-1H that assassinated Lieutenant Colonel Domingo Monterrosa.

El Salvador has operated the UH-1H, UH-1M, and UH-1N variants of the helicopter. As of 2025, the Salvadoran Air Force operates 15 UH-1 helicopters. The National Civil Police also operates some UH-1 helicopters.

== Operational history ==
US ambassador William H. Duncan and Salvadoran defense minister Vice Admiral René Merino Monroy with a UH-1H donated by the United States to El Salvador in 2023

In 1976, the United States delivered 4 UH-1H utility helicopters to El Salvador. In January 1981, leased 6 UH-1H to El Salvador. This was part of an executive order issued by US president Jimmy Carter sending emergency aid to the Salvadoran government amidst the final offensive of 1981, a military offensive conducted by the left-wing Farabundo Martí National Liberation Front (FMLN) against the Salvadoran government.

On 27 January 1982, the FMLN raided the Ilopango Air Base and destroyed several aircraft, including 6 UH-1H helicopters. The Salvadoran Air Force referred to the destruction of the UH-1H helicopters as "nothing more than a propaganda victory" ("no fue más que un golpe propagandístico") as, in the weeks following the raid, the United States sent $55 million of emergency aid to the Salvadoran government. Part of the aid included 12 new UH-1H helicopters to replace those that were destroyed. On 13 October 1982, the Salvadoran Air Force established the Helicopter Squadron (later upgraded to the Helicopter Group in 1986). In 1983, the aviation detachment of the United States Southern Command established a three-month co-pilot course at Fort Rucker that gave Salvadoran UH-1H pilots 75 hours of flight training. The course was later extended to five months that gave 130 hours of flight training.

== Usage ==
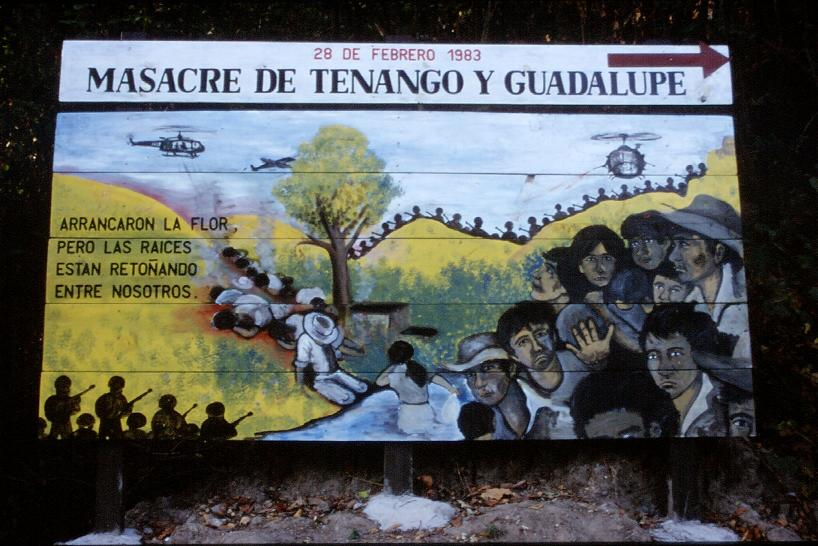
A mural commemorating the Tenango and Guadalupe massacre prominently depicting UH-1 helicopters

During the civil war, the Salvadoran Air Force utilized the UH-1H for counter-insurgency warfare in the country's mountainous countryside. The helicopters altered the Salvadoran military's tactical operations, enabling the Salvadoran military to quickly mobilize and extract forces to and from various locations across the country. The helicopters were equipped with two M2 Browning machine guns.

Around 1985, lacking a dedicated attack helicopter, the Salvadoran Air Force equipped two UH-1H helicopters with 2.75-inch (7.0 cm) rocket pods that enabled the helicopters to conduct low-altitude search and destroy operations against FMLN strongholds. Later that year, the National Guard acquired 12 UH-1M helicopters. These helped with the search and destroy operations by providing armed escort to airborne units and close air support to ground units. The UH-1Ms were equipped with M134 Miniguns, rockets, and sighting and firing devices. Towards the end of the war, some UH-1H and UH-1M helicopters were equipped with two 500-pound bombs to conduct nighttime strikes of FMLN positions. Such helicopters were referred to as "Armageddon" helicopters by 1991.

As of the 2020s, the air force primarily utilizes its UH-1 inventory for search and rescue missions, aerial transport, and support in ground and humanitarian operations.

== Variants in service ==
In 1988, the Salvadoran Air Force operated over 40 UH-1Hs and over 14 UH-1Ms, accounting for the vast majority of its helicopter inventory. As of 2025, the air force operates 15 UH-1 helicopters. The aircraft include 13 UH-1Hs and 2 UH-1Ns. The UH-1 accounts for over half of El Salvador's combat helicopter inventory. Additionally, the air force operates 3 Bell 412 helicopters, a variant of the UH-1.

UH-1 variants in Salvadoran service
UH-1H (FAS 260)

UH-1M (FAS 320)

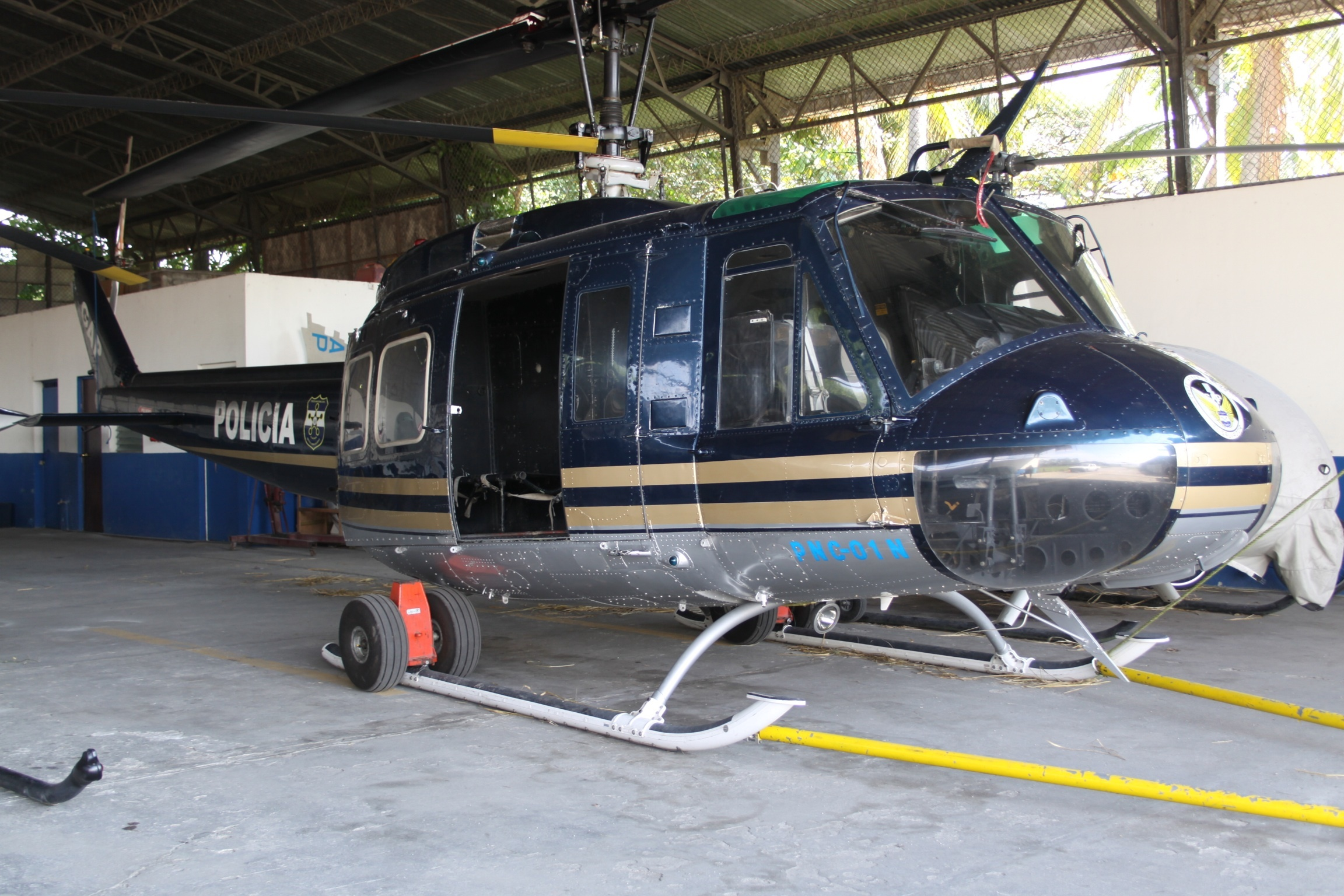
UH-1N (PNC-01N)

== Accidents and incidents ==
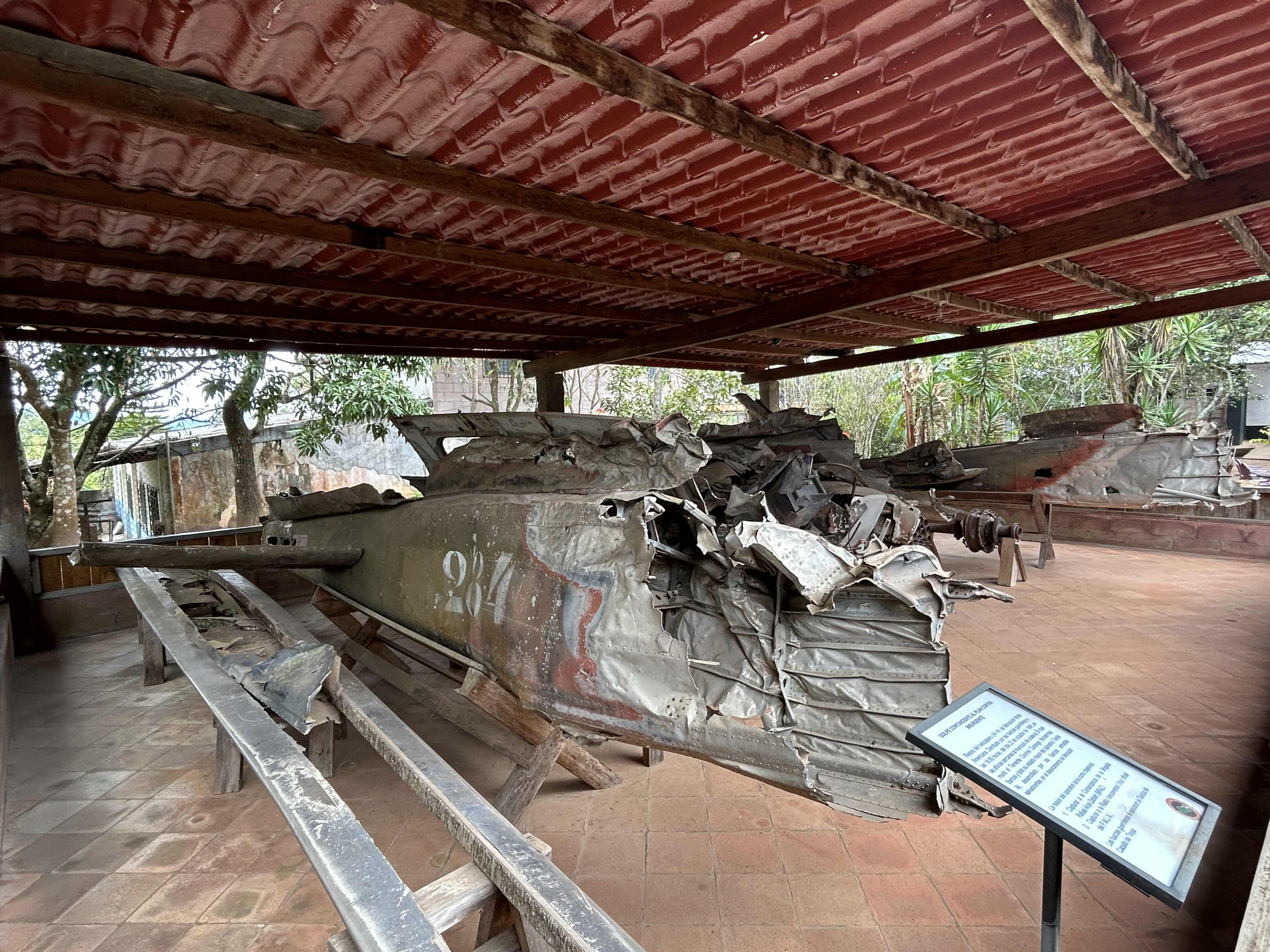
The wreckage of a UH-1H that was destroyed by a bomb in 1984, killing Lieutenant Colonel Domingo Monterrosa

On 13 October 1982, a UH-1H crashed in Las Peñas; its engine failed while evacuating wounded soldiers from the Cayahuanca Battalion of Military Detachment No. 1. The crash, that killed all 6 on board, was the first fatal accident involving the UH-1 in Salvadoran service. On 19 February 1984, two UH-1H helicopters collided into each other after one was shot at by People's Revolutionary Army guerrillas. The mid-air collision killed all 28 people onboard both helicopters.

On 23 October 1984, a UH-1H was destroyed near Joateca by a bomb onboard. The bomb was planted by the FMLN inside a radio transmitter that the military was coaxed into capturing. Believing that the radio transmitter was that of Radio Venceremos, an underground radio station that the FMLN used to broadcast propaganda, the military intended to display it as a war trophy. The bomb exploded as the UH-1H transporting it was climbing. All 14 people onboard were killed. Among them included Lieutenant Colonel Domingo Monterrosa, the commander of the 3rd Brigade. Monterrosa was the bombing's primary target as the FMLN sought to avenge over 1,000 people killed during the 1981 El Mozote massacre by the Atlácatl Battalion when Monterrosa commanded the unit. The wreckage of the bombed UH-1H is on display at the Museum of the Revolution in Perquín.

On 8 September 2024, a UH-1H crashed near Pasaquina. The crash killed 9 people, including National Civil Police director Mauricio Arriaza Chicas and Manuel Coto, a former bank manager accused of embezzlement who had been extradited to Salvadoran custody at in Honduras earlier that day. An investigation determined that bad weather, low visibility, and pilot error led to the crash.

== See also ==
- Weapons of the Salvadoran Civil War
