= Napoleón Herson Calitto =

Salvadoran commanding officer (1941–1984)

Lieutenant Colonel Napoleón Herson Calitto
- Born: Napoleón Herson Calitto Arbaiza; 14 December 1941; San Salvador, El Salvador
- Died: 23 October 1984 (aged 42); Joateca, El Salvador
- Cause of death: Helicopter crash
- Education: Captain General Gerardo Barrios Military School
- Military career
- Allegiance: El Salvador
- Branch: Salvadoran Army
- Service years: 1963–1984
- Rank: Lieutenant colonel
- Commands: Antonal Battalion
- Conflicts: Football War; Salvadoran Civil War †

Napoleón Herson Calitto Arbaiza (14 December 1941 – 23 October 1984) was a Salvadoran military officer during the Salvadoran Civil War.

== Biography ==
Napoleón Herson Calitto Arbaiza was born on 14 December 1941 in San Salvador, El Salvador. Calitto graduated from the Captain General Gerardo Barrios Military School in 1963. After graduating from the military academy, Calitto went on to take military classes from American soldiers in Panama, and later went on to Taiwan to study anti-insurgency tactics. On 13 November 1964 he became a lieutenant. His first combat assignment was as a gunman in the 2nd Artillery Brigade during the 1969 Football War against Honduras. He became a lieutenant colonel on 31 July 1981.

In December 1981, Calitto was assigned to become the founding commander of the Atonal Battalion, one of six Rapid Deployment Infantry Battalions (BIRIs). The battalion was garrisoned in the Usulután Department.

In May 1984, Calitto became the commander of the Command and Instruction Center of the Salvadoran Army. Calitto was killed in a helicopter crash on 23 October 1984. An investigation by the Salvadoran Army determined that the helicopter was bombed by the FMLN. Also among those killed included Colonel Domingo Monterrosa.

In 1985, a street in Usulután was named after Calitto. A monument was raised that commemorated his life.

== Personal life ==
Calitto married Juanita Flores and the couple had two sons, Herson Napoleón Calitto Jr. and Ronnie Stanley Calitto. Napoleón Jr. joined the Salvadoran Army in 1983 and died in combat on 19 February 1984 when the helicopter he was traveling in was shot down by the Farabundo Martí National Liberation Front (FMLN). Ronnie joined the United Nations (UN) and served with the United Nations Mission in Liberia (UNMIL) and Sudan (UNMIS). She later he joined the UN Office for the Coordination of Humanitarian Affairs (OCHA) in Afghanistan as Humanitarian Affairs and Civil-Military Coordination Officer.

Calitto also had a daughter out of wedlock in October 1967 with Leonor Herrera. He also married Frida Larreynaga in December 1975 and had another daughter.
