= Salvadoran Air Force =

Air warfare branch of the Armed Forces of El Salvador

- Fuerza Aérea Salvadoreña
- Emblem of the Salvadoran Air Force
- Founded: 20 March 1923; 103 years ago (as the Salvadoran Air Fleet)
- Country: El Salvador
- Type: Air force
- Role: Aerial warfare
- Size: 2,000; 49 aircraft
- Part of: Armed Forces of El Salvador
- Engagements: 1931 Salvadoran coup d'état; La Matanza; Palm Sunday Coup; Football War; 1972 Salvadoran coup attempt; Salvadoran Civil War; Haitian conflict (intervention)
- Website: www.fas.gob.sv/fuerza_aerea.html

Commanders
- Commander-in-Chief: President Nayib Bukele
- Minister of National Defense: Vice Admiral René Merino Monroy
- Chief of the Air Force Staff: Colonel Pablo Alberto Soriano Cruz

Insignia
- Flag

- Roundel

Aircraft flown
- Attack: A-37
- Attack helicopter: Bell 412, MD 500, UH-1H, UH-1M
- Trainer helicopter: Hughes 269
- Trainer: SR22, T-35 Pillán
- Transport: Arava, C208

The Salvadoran Air Force (Spanish: Fuerza Aérea Salvadoreña, abbreviated FAS) is the air force branch of the Armed Forces of El Salvador. As of 2025, the air force has 51 aircraft, most of which are from the United States.

== History ==
=== Early history ===
The Salvadoran Air Fleet (Flotilla Aérea Salvadoreña, abbreviated FAS) was established on 20 March 1923 by Salvadoran president Alfonso Quiñónez Molina twenty days after assuming office. He established the Military Aviation Course on 27 June 1923 with Italian pilot Enrico Massi as its flight instructor. Massi was killed later that year when the Caudron G.3 he was in crashed in Ilopango while teaching Juan Ramón Munés. On 19 February 1924, the Salvadoran government created the Salvadoran Aviation Headquarters and appointed General Carlos Carmona Tadey as Chief of Salvadoran Aviation.

On 12 July 1924, Munés and Ricardo Aberle graduated from the Military Aviation School as El Salvador's first military pilots. In 1927, the air fleet consisted of fifteen aircraft; fourteen were named after El Salvador's fourteen departments and its sole Breguet 14 bomber was named after former president Gerardo Barrios. Carmona resigned as the air fleet's chief on 7 December 1927 after a failed coup and was replaced by General Antonio Claramount Lucero.

=== Military dictatorship ===
On 8 December 1931, Munés became the chief of the air fleet six days after the 1931 coup d'état that established a military dictatorship. In January 1932, air fleet helped suppress a rebellion in western El Salvador by conducting reconnaissance missing and bombing runs of rebel positions. President General Maximiliano Hernández Martínez bought several new aircraft for the air fleet including Curtiss-Wright CW-14 Osprey trainers, Fairchild M-62 trainers, and four Caproni AP.1 bombers. During World War II, the air fleet patrolled El Salvador's coastline. The air fleet supported the 2 April 1944 Palm Sunday Coup that attempted to overthrow Martínez. North American AT-6 Texan bombers attacked loyalist positions in San Salvador but the coup failed and many pilots were executed.

El Salvador signed the Inter-American Treaty of Reciprocal Assistance in 1947 and the air force acquired American aircraft. During the 1950s, the air force used two Douglas C-47 Skytrains as the presidential transporters.

The Salvadoran Air Force first saw action in the 1969 Football War against Honduras equipped with F4U Corsairs and P-51 Mustangs. The Salvadoran Air Force attacked Honduran Air Force positions early, but the Honduran Air Force eventually retaliated and destroyed much of the Salvadoran Air Force. After the war, the Salvadoran Air Force acquired newer aircraft. After the 1972 presidential election, Colonel Benjamín Mejía attempted to overthrow the Salvadoran government in support of José Napoleón Duarte, the election's loser. The air force remained loyal to the government and bombed rebel positions in San Salvador. The coup ultimately failed.

=== Salvadoran Civil War ===
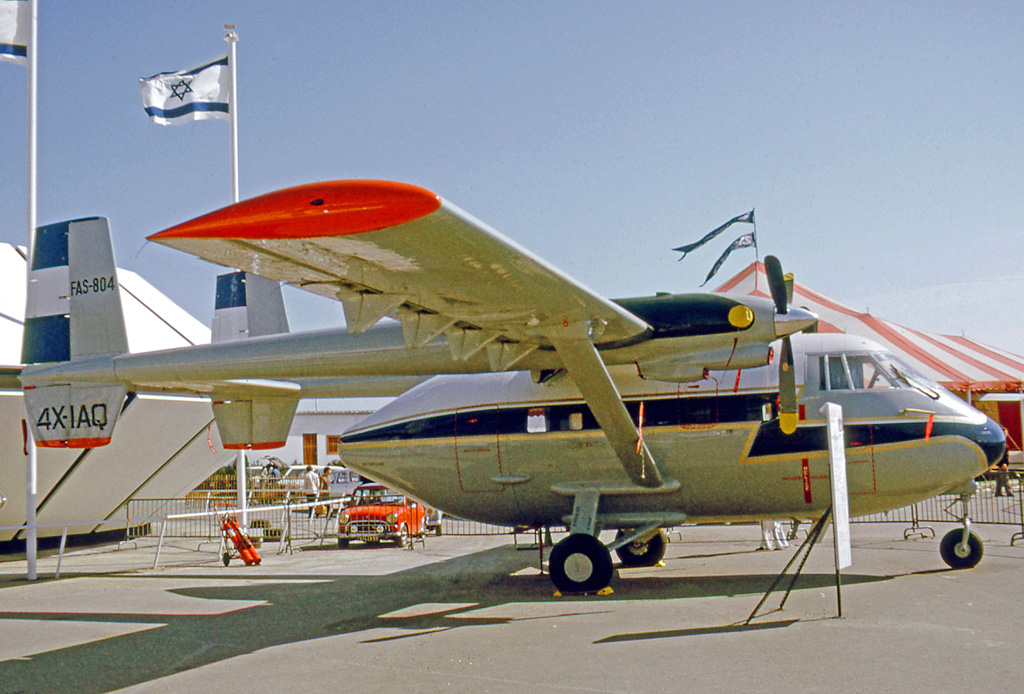
IAI Arava 201 of the Salvadoran Air Force in 1975

The Salvadoran Air Force acquired its first jet aircraft in 1974 when it acquired the Fouga CM.170 Magister. From the late 1970s, isolated guerrilla actions rapidly developed into a civil war. US aid to El Salvador in 1980 consisted of six UH-1Hs and four in 1981; they were used as gunships. Other deliveries brought that number of UH-1Hs in service up to 40. In January 1982, the rebel Farabundo Martí National Liberation Front (FMLN) launched an attack of the Ilopango International Airport. Minister of Defense General José Guillermo García described the attack as a "terrorist attack". Following the attack, the United States sent the Salvadoran government $55 million and new Bell UH-1H helicopters. During the civil war, the air force did not bomb targets indiscriminately.

On 23 October 1984, the FMLN bombed a FAS UH-1H in Joateca killing all fourteen people on board including Colonel Domingo Monterrosa. The bombing occurred when the FMLN booby trapped a radio transmitter disguised as the primary transmitter for the FMLN's Radio Venceremos. The FMLN coaxed Monterrosa into capturing the rigged transmitter and claiming it as a war trophy leading to the bomb inside detonating after takeoff.

A FAS Douglas DC-6B transporter crashed after departing Ilopango International Airport on 1 May 1986. The accident killed all 37 military personnel on board. The Salvadoran government did not rule out sabotage, but the FMLN never claimed responsibility for the crash.

A four-engined Douglas DC-6B provided long-range logistical capability between 1975 and its retirement in 1998. It was used on supply flights to and from the United States. In December 1984, two AC-47s were delivered to be in service with the other three C-47s in use. The civil war ended in mutual exhaustion in 1990 and the Air Force was geared for internal security. The air force support demining operations conducted by the Belgian company IDAS after the civil war.

=== Post-civil war ===
On 6 May 2013, in celebration of the 189th anniversary of the Armed Forces of El Salvador, the Salvadoran government announced the planned purchase of 10 A-37 aircraft from Chile.

In September 2016 it was reported that the Salvadoran Air Force in cooperation with the Colombian Aerospace Force was finalizing negotiations on modernizing its Bell UH-1H helicopters to the Huey 2 standard.

In 2023, the United States donated twelve MD Helicopters MD 530Fs to the Salvadoran Air Force. On 8 September 2024, an air force Bell UH-1H crashed in poor weather near Pasaquina killing all nine people on board including Mauricio Arriaza Chicas, the chief of the National Civil Police, and Manuel Coto, a former bank manager. In 2025, air force personnel were deployed to Haiti as part of the Multinational Security Support Mission in Haiti to combat organized gangs there.

== Structure ==
Per article 157 of the constitution of El Salvador, the president of El Salvador is the commander-in-chief of the air force. The air force is administered by the Joint General Staff and is overseen by the minister of national defense.

== Aircraft ==
=== Current inventory ===
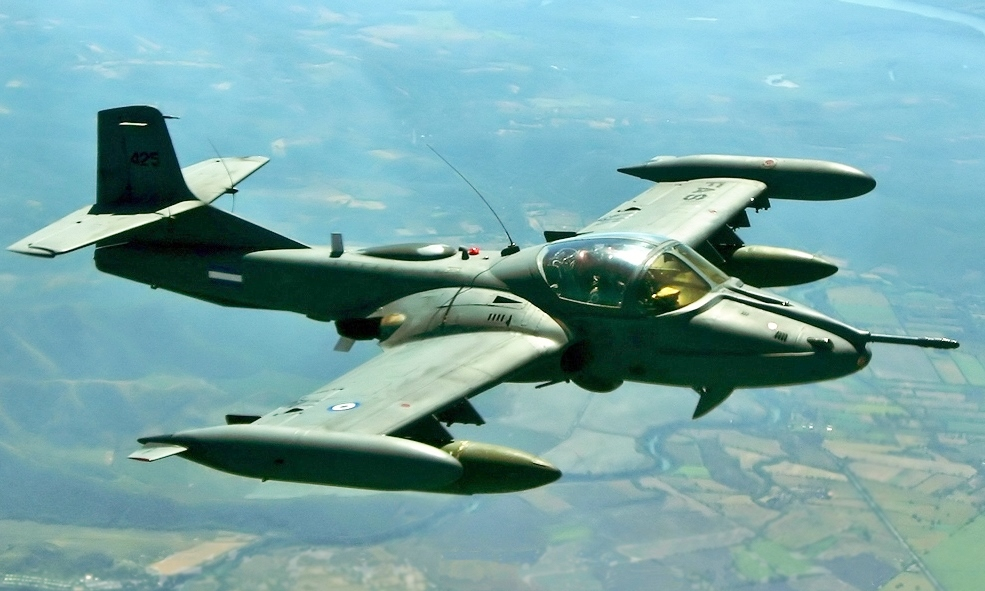
A FAS A-37 Dragonfly in flight over Mexico

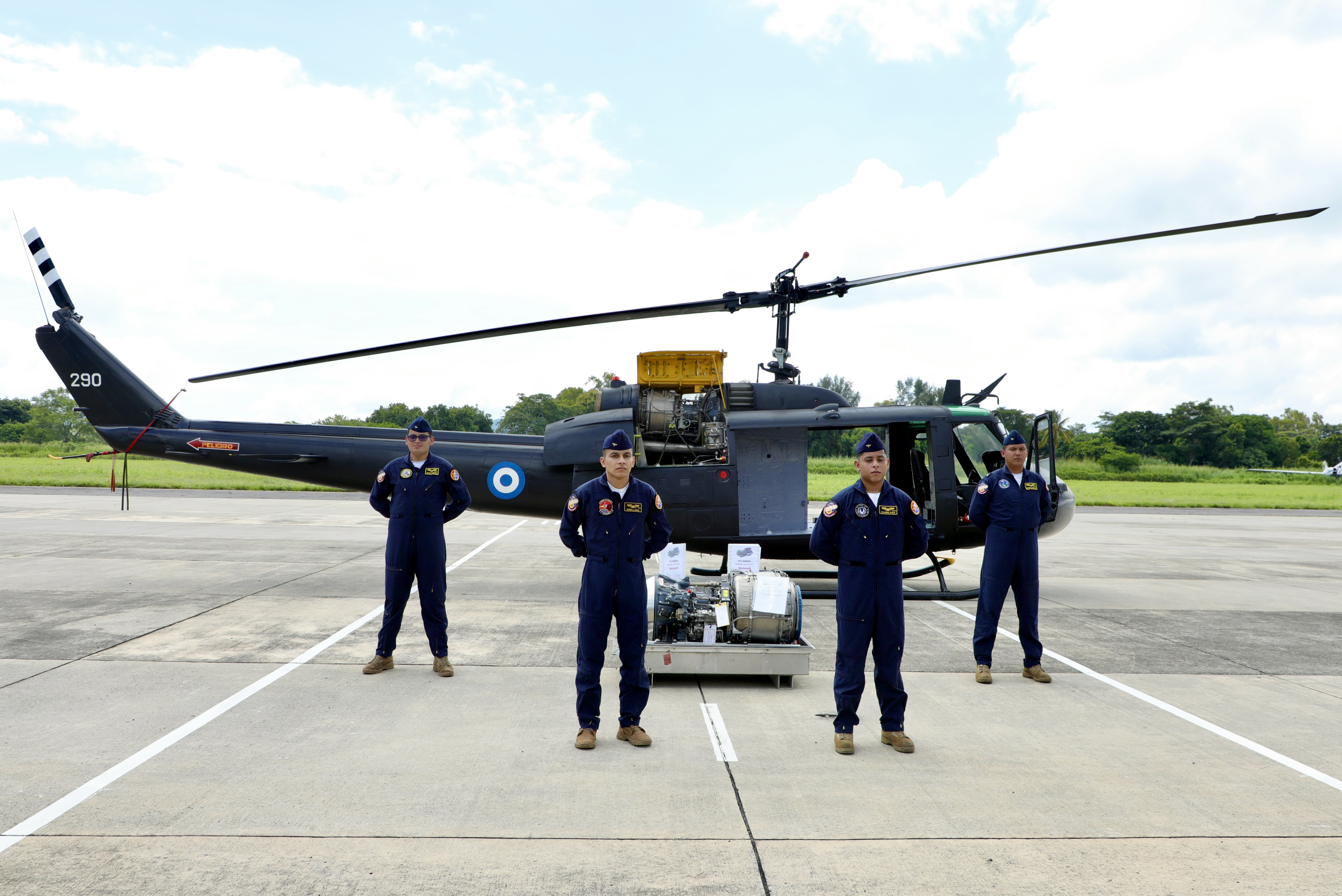
FAS servicemen with a Bell UH-1 Iroquois

The following is a list of all aircraft in the Salvadoran Air Force's inventory as of 2025.

Aircraft	Origin	Type	Variant(s)	Inventory
Combat aircraft
Cessna A-37 Dragonfly	United States	Attack	A-37B	15
Transport
Cessna 208 Caravan	United States	Transport		1 (Note: An additional 1 on order.)
IAI Arava	Israel	Transport		3
Helicopters
Bell 412	United States	Combat		3
Bell UH-1 Iroquois	United States	Combat	UH-1H, UH-1M, UH-1N	15
Hughes 269	United States	Trainer		5
MD Helicopters MD 500	United States	Combat	500E, 530F	7
Trainer aircraft
Cirrus SR22	United States	Trainer		2
ENAER T-35 Pillán	Chile	Trainer		2

=== Retired aircraft ===
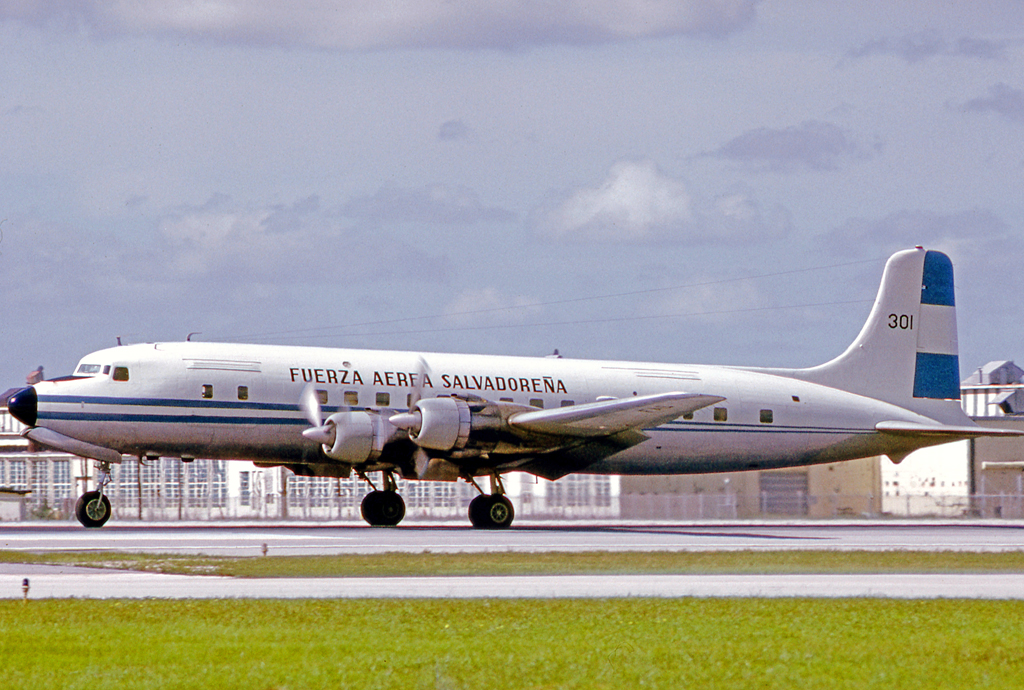
A FAS Douglas DC-6 in 1975

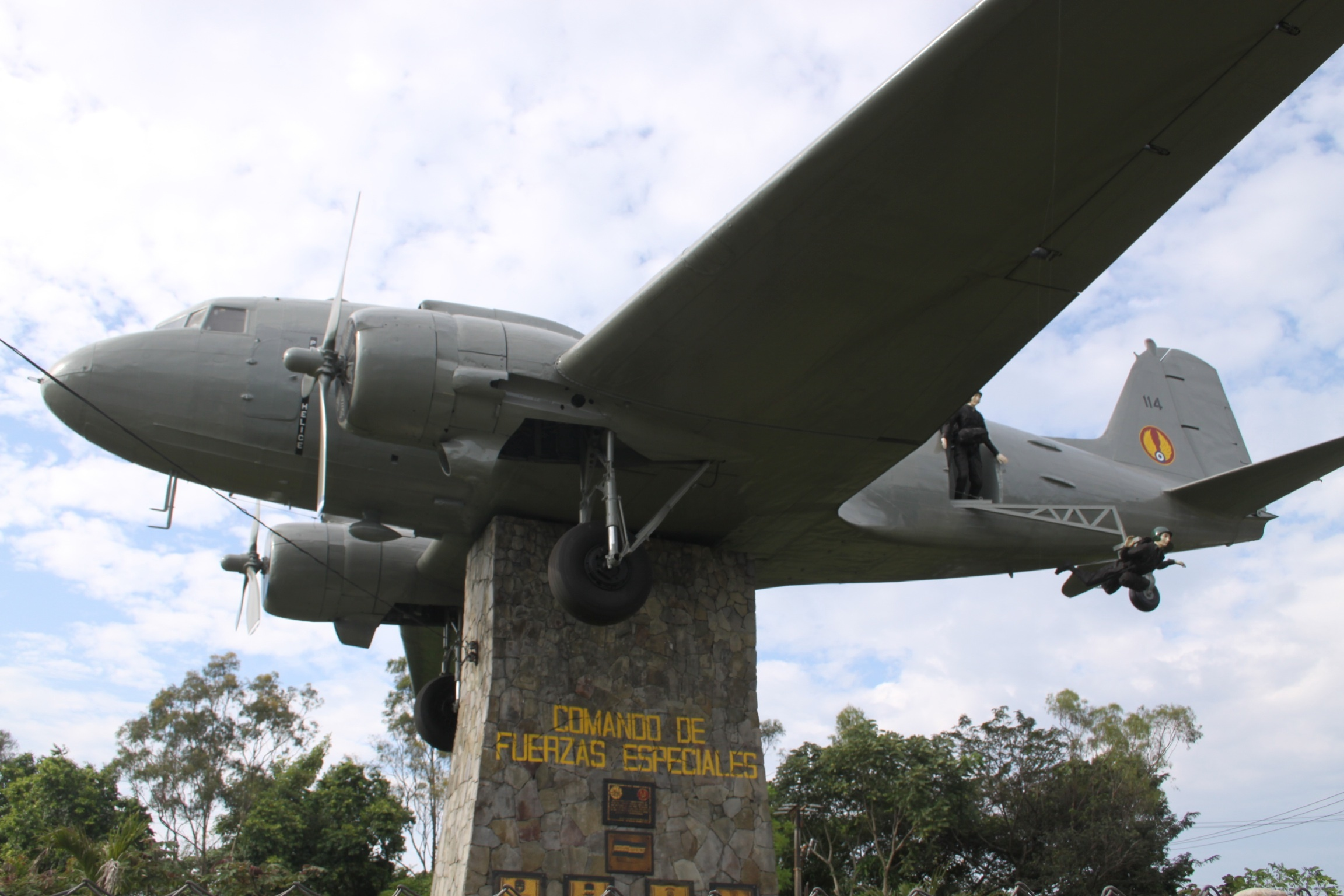
A former FAS Douglas C-47 Skytrain at Ilopango International Airport

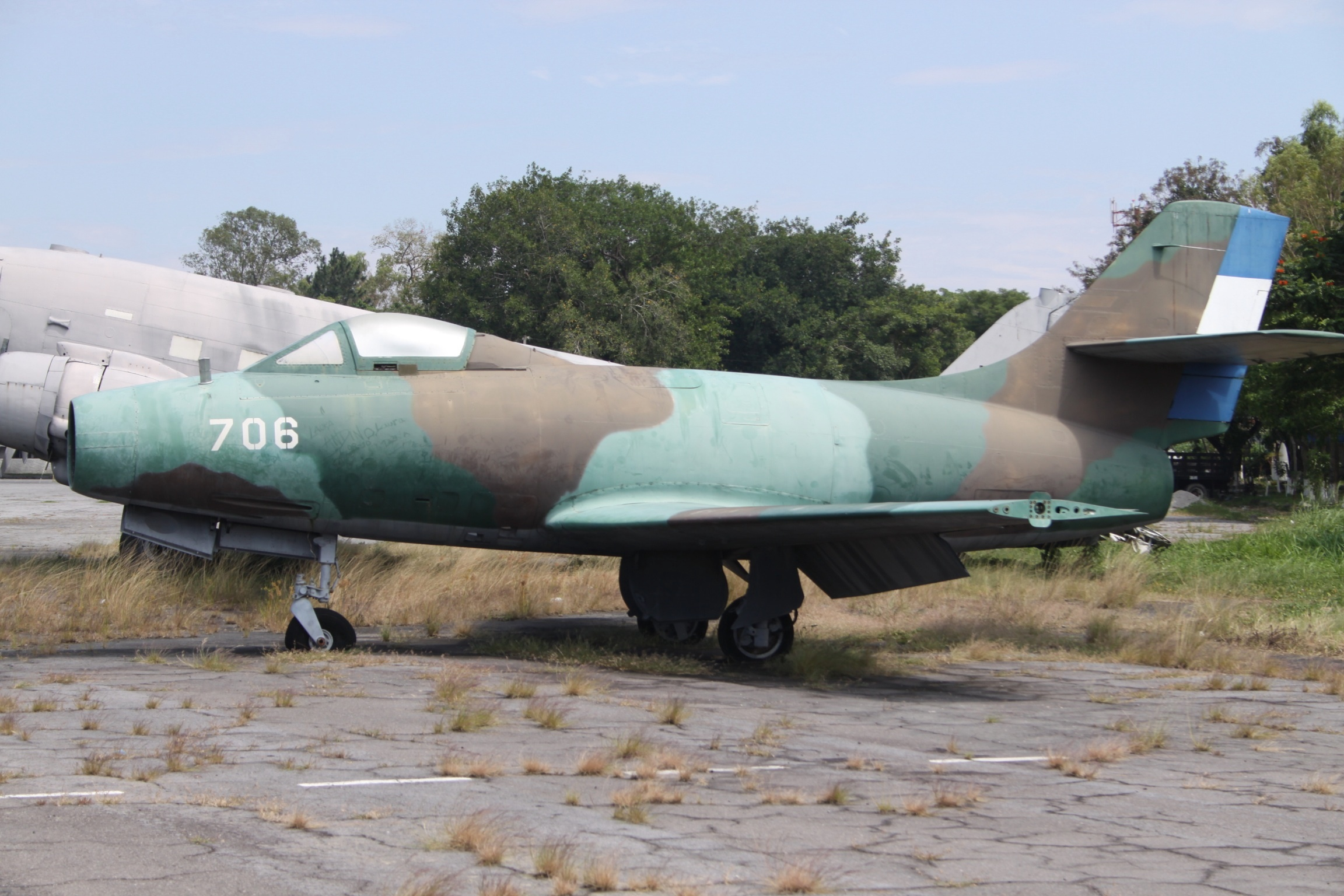
A former FAS Dassault Ouragan

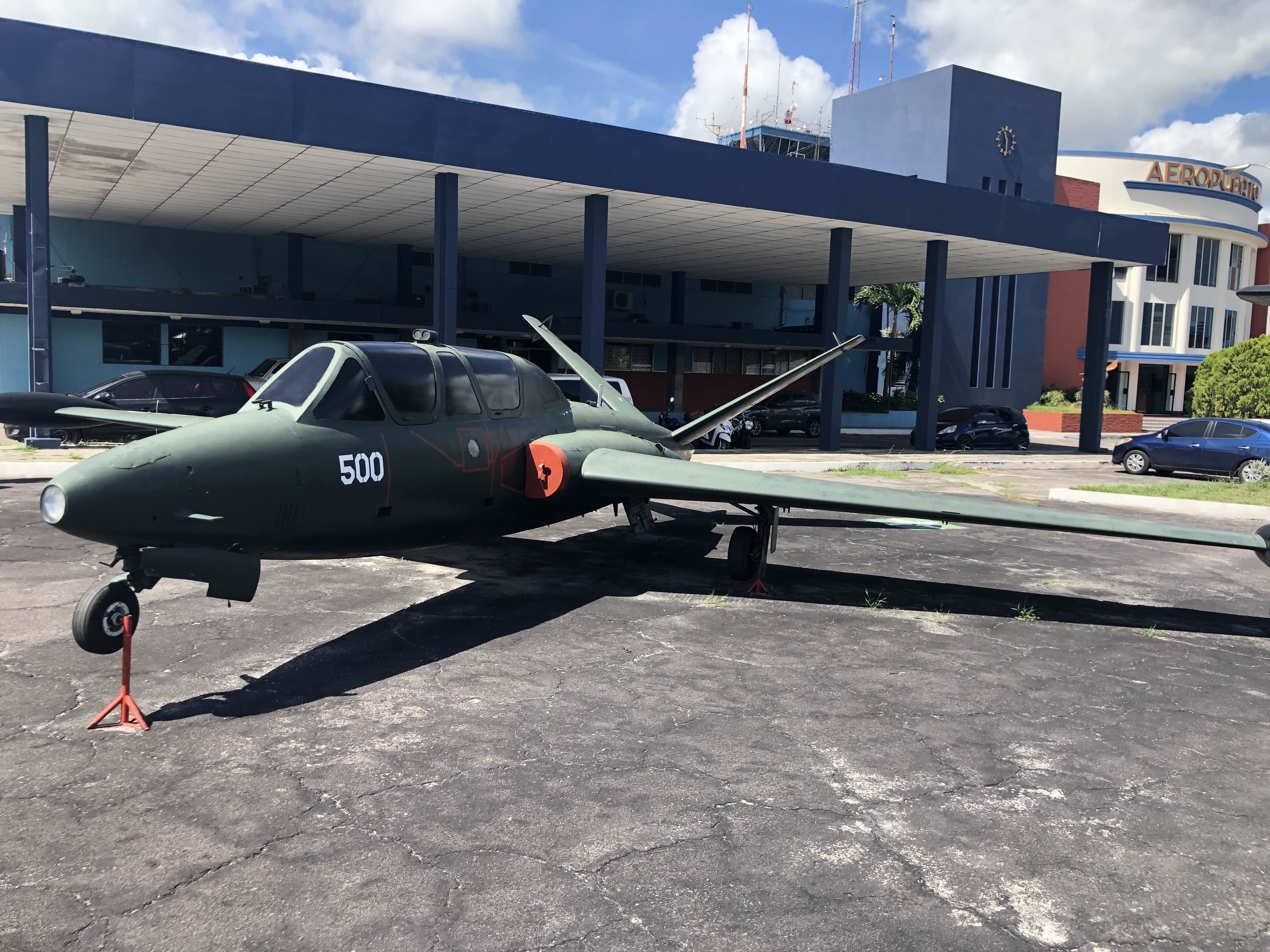
A former FAS Fouga CM.170 Magister

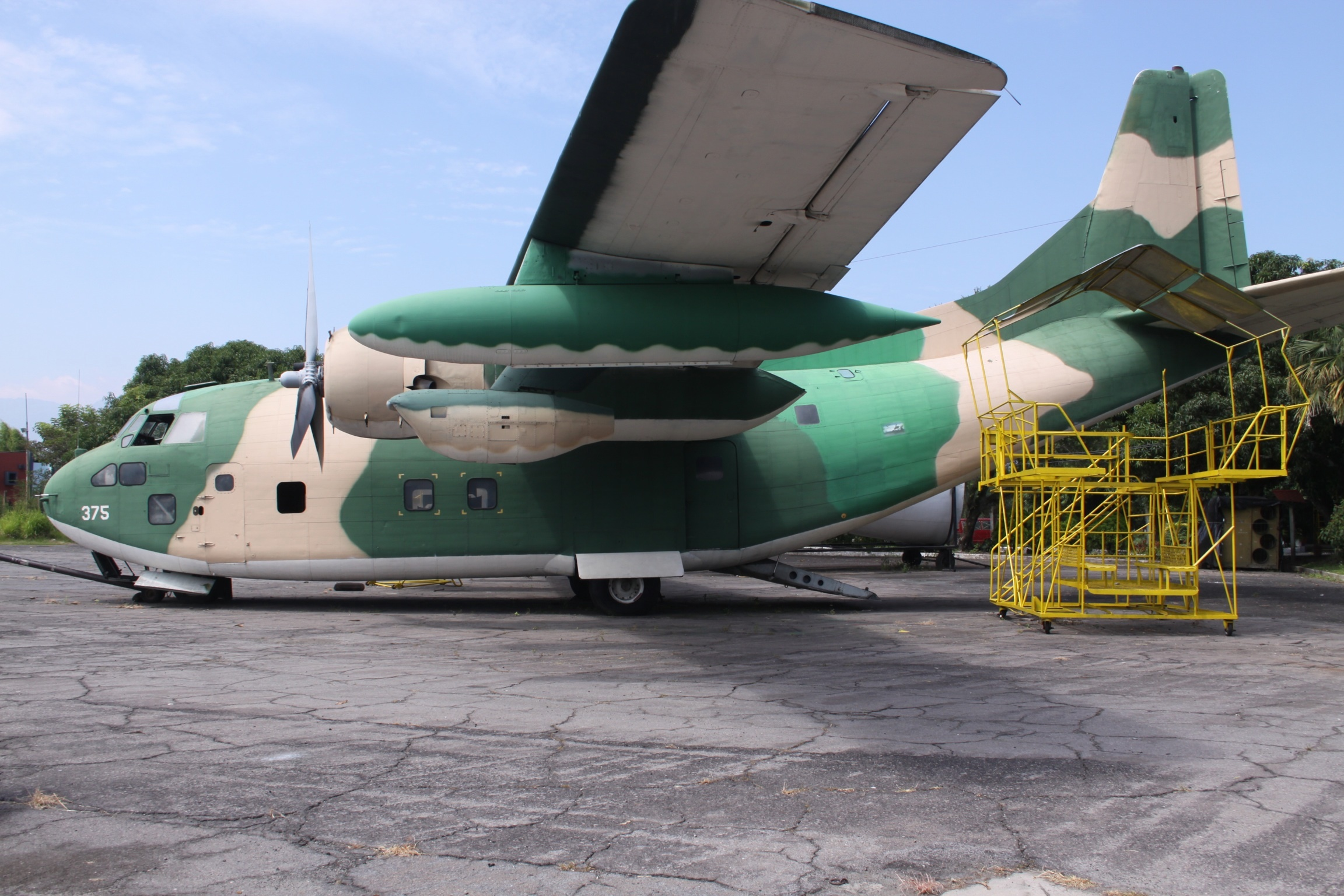
A former FAS Fairchild C-123 Provider

The following are some aircraft that the Salvadoran Air Force formerly operated.

Aircraft	Origin	Type	Variant(s)	Inventory	Ref.
Combat aircraft
Breguet 14	France	Bomber	A.2	1	
Caproni AP.1	Italy	Bomber		4	
Cavalier Mustang	United States	Ground attack	F-51D, II	25	
Dassault Ouragan	France	Fighter-bomber		18	
Dassault Super Mystère	France	Fighter-bomber		4	
Douglas B-26 Invader	United States	Ground attack	B-26B	5	
Douglas AC-47 Spooky	United States	Ground attack	AC-47D	7	
Vought FG Corsair	United States	Fighter-bomber	1D	20	
Transport
Beechcraft Model 18	United States	Transport	AT-11	1	
Cessna 170	United States	Utility		1	
Cessna 180 Skywagon	United States	Utility		1–2	
Cessna 185 Skywagon	United States	Utility	U-17	1–2	
Cessna 210 Centurion	United States	Utility		1	
Dornier Do 28	West Germany	Transport		12	
Douglas C-47 Skytrain	United States	Transport	C-47D	6	
Douglas DC-6	United States	Transport	DC-6B	2	
Fairchild C-123 Provider	United States	Transport		2	
Fairchild Swearingen Metroliner	United States	Transport	III	1	
Piper PA-23	United States	Utility	250 Aztec		
Rockwell Commander 114	United States	Transport		1	
Waco 10	United States	Transport		2	
Surveillance aircraft
Cessna Skymaster	United States	Forward air control	O-2A	5–9	
Helicopters
Aérospatiale Alouette III	France	Transport		3	
Aérospatiale SA 315B Lama	France	Utility		3	
Canadair North Star	Canada	Transport	DC-4M	1	
Fairchild Hiller FH-1100	United States	Utility		1	
Hughes 300	United States	Trainer	300C	1	
Hughes 500D	United States	Attack		9	
Trainer aircraft
Beechcraft T-34 Mentor	United States	Trainer		1	
Caudron G.3	France	Trainer			
Cessna T-41 Mescalero	United States	Trainer	A, C	7	
Curtiss JN Jenny	United States	Trainer	4D		
Curtiss-Wright CW-14 Osprey	United States	Trainer			
Fairchild PT-19	United States	Trainer	PT-19B	6	
Fouga CM.170 Magister	France	Trainer/light strike		12	
Hanriot HD.32	France	Trainer	HD.320	5	
Lincoln Standard L.S.5	United States	Trainer			
Luscombe 8	United States	Trainer	A	2	
North American T-6 Texan	United States	Trainer	AT-6C, AT-6D, SNJ-4, SNJ-5		
SOCATA Rallye 230	France	Trainer	235GS	16	
Vultee BT-13 Valiant	United States	Trainer	A	21	
Waco F	United States	Trainer		2	

== List of commanders ==
The following is a list of commanders of the Salvadoran Air Force.

#	Commander	Rank	Assumed office	Left office	Time in office
1	Humberto Aberle	Major captain	20 March 1923	20 February 1924	337 days
2	Carlos Carmona Tadey	General	20 February 1924	7 December 1927	3 years, 290 days
3	Antonio Claramount Lucero	General	7 December 1927	15 May 1929	1 year, 98 days
4	José Trabanino	General	15 May 1929	8 December 1931	2 years, 268 days
5	Juan Ramón Munés	Lieutenant colonel	8 December 1931	6 April 1944	12 years, 120 days
6	Hernán Barón	Major	6 April 1944	5 December 1944	243 days
7	Francisco Alberto Ponce	Captain	5 December 1944	15 May 1945	161 days
8	Hernán Barón	Lieutenant colonel	15 May 1945	15 June 1945	31 days
9	Gustavo López Castillo	General	15 June 1945	14 December 1948	3 years, 182 days
10	Francisco Alberto Ponce	Major	14 December 1948	16 December 1949	1 year, 2 days
11	Hernán Barón	Lieutenant colonel	16 December 1949	30 September 1950	288 days
12	Luis Felipe Escobar	Colonel	30 September 1950	14 October 1955	5 years, 14 days
13	José Velásquez	Lieutenant colonel	14 October 1955	28 October 1960	5 years, 14 days
14	Jorge Rovira Pleitez	Lieutenant colonel	28 October 1960	2 August 1967	6 years, 278 days
15	Salvador Adalberto Henríquez	Major	2 August 1967	4 December 1971	4 years, 124 days
16	Rafael Antonio Herrera	Lieutenant colonel	4 December 1971	7 April 1972	125 days
17	Felipe de Jesús Artiga	Lieutenant colonel	7 April 1972	3 January 1975	2 years, 271 days
18	Godofredo Regalado	Lieutenant colonel	3 January 1975	1 July 1979	4 years, 149 days
19	Óscar Nelson Bolaños	Colonel	1 July 1979	15 October 1979	136 days
20	Juan Rafael Bustillo	General	15 October 1979	31 December 1989	10 years, 77 days
21	Rafael Antonio Villamariona	General	31 December 1989	1 May 1991	1 year, 121 days
22	Héctor Leonel Lobo Pérez	Colonel	1 May 1991	30 June 1993	2 years, 60 days
23	Juan Antonio Martínez Varela	General	30 June 1993	30 June 1998	5 years, 0 days
24	Milton Antonio Andrade Cabrera	Colonel	1 January 1999	16 January 2002	3 years, 200 days
25	Ricardo Benjamín Abrego Abrego	Brigadier general	1 February 2002	1 June 2004	2 years, 121 days
26	Jorge Enrique Navas López	Colonel	1 June 2004	1 January 2006	1 year, 214 days
27	Salvador Palacios Castillo	Colonel	1 January 2006	1 January 2009	3 years, 0 days
28	Jaime Leonardo Parada González	Colonel	1 January 2009	1 January 2010	1 year, 0 days
29	Nelson Edgardo Hernández Díaz	Colonel	1 January 2010	1 June 2011	1 year, 151 days
30	Hugo Aristides Angulo Rogel	Colonel	1 June 2011	1 January 2013	1 year, 214 days
31	Carlos Jaime Mena Torres	Brigadier general	1 January 2011	1 January 2016	3 years, 0 days
32	Salvador Ernesto Hernández Vega	Colonel	1 January 2016	1 January 2019	3 years, 0 days
33	Manuel Fabio Calderón Menéndez	Colonel	1 January 2019	1 January 2020	1 year, 0 days
34	Pablo Alberto Soriano Cruz	Colonel	1 January 2020	Incumbent	6 years, 317 days

== See also ==
- List of aircraft shootdowns#Salvadoran Civil War (1979–1992)

== Bibliography ==
- Eastwood A.B. and Roach J.R., Piston Engined Airliner Production List, 2007, The Aviation Hobby Shop
- World Aircraft information files Brightstar publishing London File 342 sheet 2
