= 1984 Joateca Bell UH-1 bombing =

Helicopter bombed by the FMLN in El Salvador in 1984

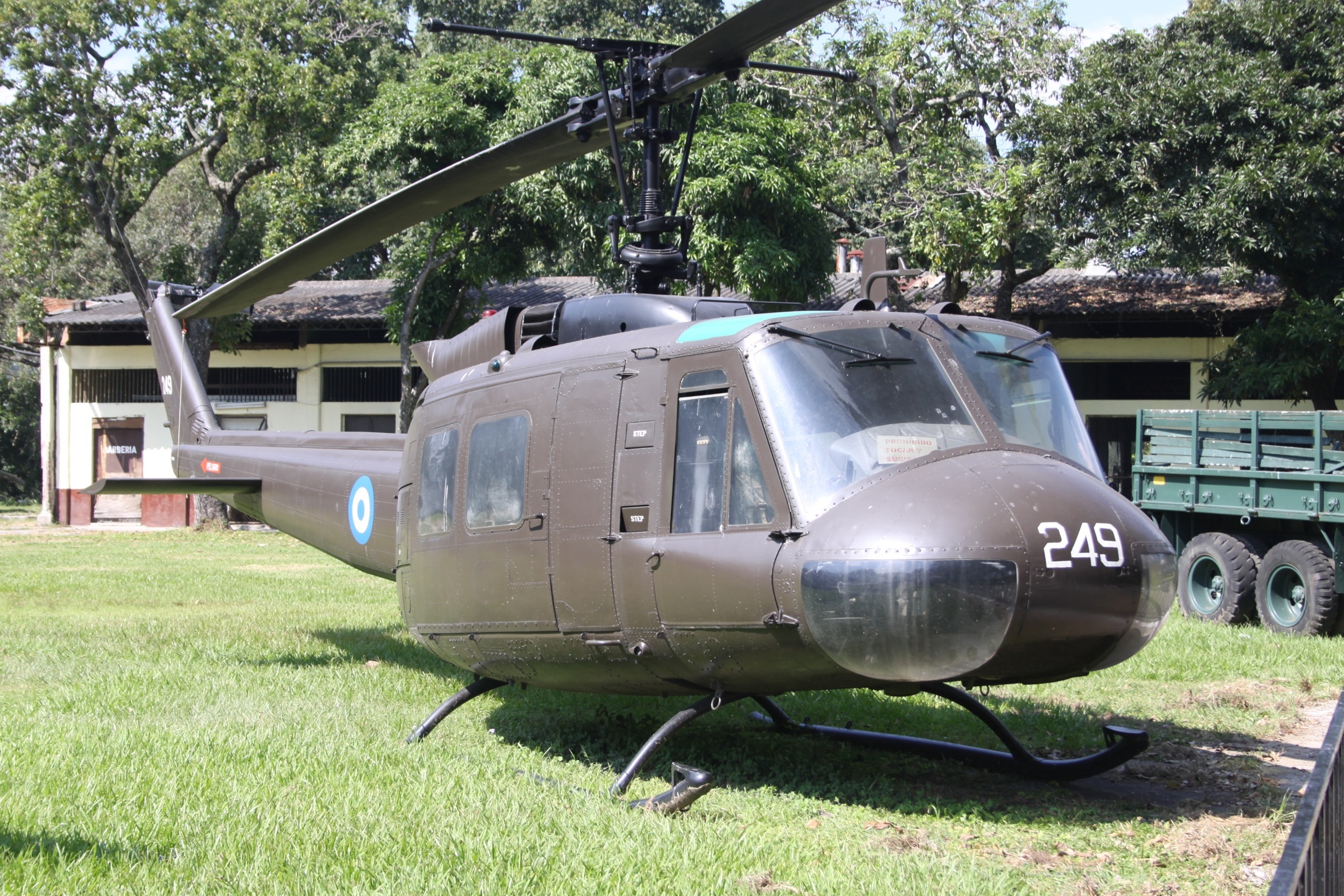
- A Bell UH-1H of the Salvadoran Air Force, similar to the one involved in the bombing

Bombing
- Date: 23 October 1984
- Summary: In-flight bombing and crash
- Site: Joateca, Morazán, El Salvador; 13°53′58″N 88°03′02″W

Aircraft
- Aircraft type: Bell UH-1H
- Operator: Salvadoran Air Force
- Registration: 284
- Flight origin: Joateca, El Salvador
- Destination: Los Comandos Airport, San Francisco Gotera, El Salvador
- Occupants: 14
- Passengers: 11
- Crew: 3
- Fatalities: 14 (all)
- Survivors: 0

On 23 October 1984, the Farabundo Martí National Liberation Front (FMLN) bombed a Bell UH-1H of the Salvadoran Air Force in Joateca, El Salvador during the Salvadoran Civil War. The bombing killed all 14 occupants on board the helicopter, including Salvadoran lieutenant colonel Domingo Monterrosa who commanded the American-trained Atlácatl Battalion.

The FMLN planted dynamite inside of a radio transmitter that they portrayed as being the primary transmitter for Radio Venceremos, a radio station that the FMLN operated. Monterrosa sought to capture the transmitter as a war trophy, and the dynamite detonated as the helicopter climbed 1,000 feet (300 m) in altitude. The Salvadoran military claimed that the helicopter crashed due to a mechanical failure while the FMLN claimed that it had shot down the aircraft with heavy machine gun fire. One month after the crash, the Salvadoran military determined that a bomb took down the helicopter.

== Background ==
=== Domingo Monterrosa ===
In December 1981, Salvadoran lieutenant colonel Domingo Monterrosa ordered soldiers of the Atlácatl Battalion to indiscriminately kill civilians in the village of El Mozote in the Arambala municipality of the Morazán Department. The massacre killed over 1,000 people. Morazán was one of the strongholds of the rebel Farabundo Martí National Liberation Front (FMLN) in eastern El Salvador during the Salvadoran Civil War (1979–1992).

When Monterrosa was promoted to command the Salvadoran Army's 3rd Brigade in 1984, the FMLN listed him as a high priority target to have killed. The FMLN's primary motivation to kill Monterrosa was because his promotion made him the Salvadoran Army's most senior military commander in eastern El Salvador, and the FMLN saw Monterrosa as their biggest threat. The FMLN also wanted to avenge the victims of the El Mozote massacre three years prior.

=== Radio Venceremos ===
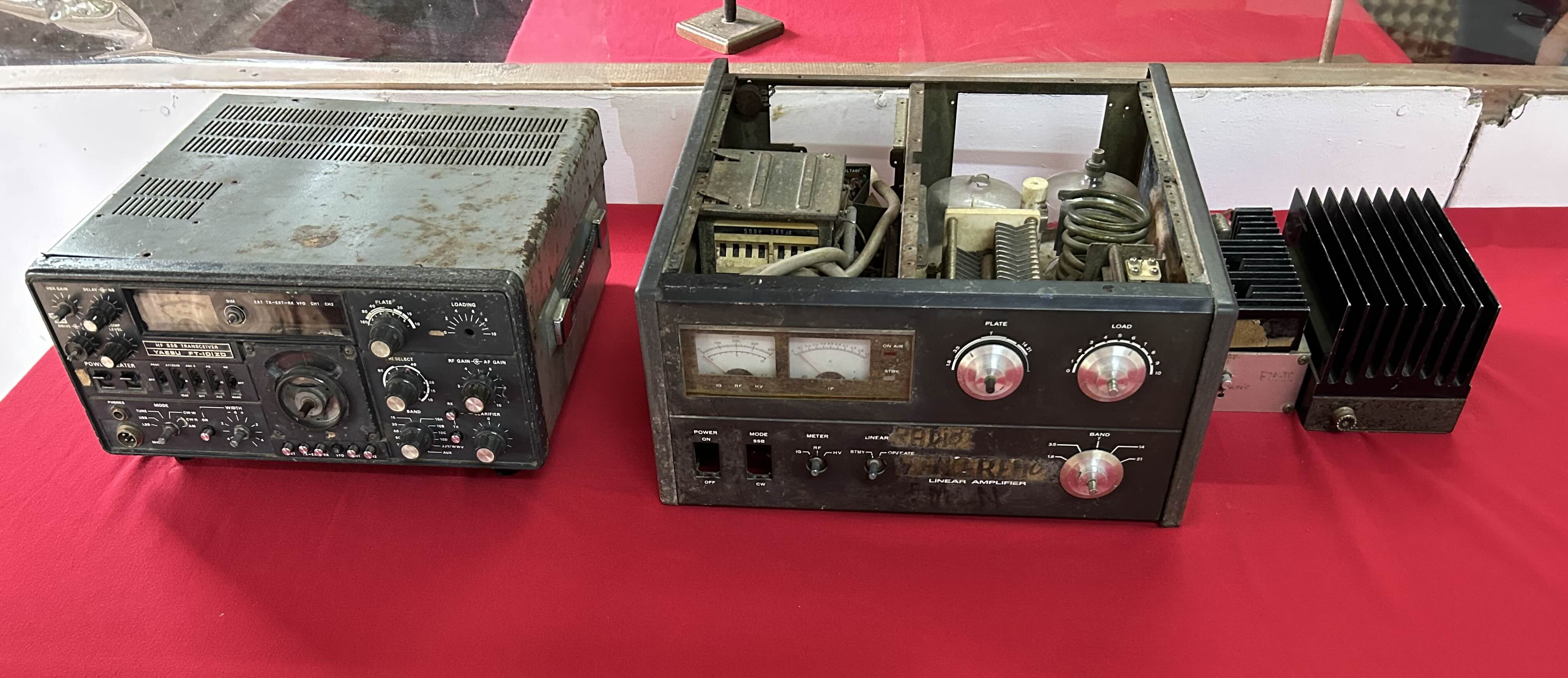
The original Radio Venceremos transmitter at the Museum of the Revolution in Perquín, El Salvador

One of Monterrosa's obsessions during the civil war was to capture the primary radio transmitter that the FMLN used to broadcast Radio Venceremos, a radio station that it used to denounce the Salvadoran government's war crimes and spread pro-FMLN propaganda. Radio Venceremos was operated under territory that Monterrosa claimed he controlled in Morazán, and he sought to capture the transmitter as a war trophy.

== Bombing ==
=== Army captures disguised bomb ===
On 23 October 1984, the People's Revolutionary Army (one of the groups that composed the FMLN) coaxed government soldiers into a skirmish near Joateca, Morazán. The FMLN retreated and appeared to abandon the primary transmitter for Radio Venceremos which was subsequently captured by the Salvadoran Army. Instead, the rebels had planted 8 sticks of dynamite into a spare radio transmitter previously used for Radio Venceremos and intentionally allowed the army to capture it in the hopes that it would kill Monterrosa himself. The dynamite was rigged to detonate if it climbed 1,000 feet (300 m) in altitude. The rigged transmitter's capture occurred during Operation Torola 4, a helicopter assault on FMLN positions in Morazán that was commanded by Monterrosa.

Monterrosa celebrated the capture of the transmitter. He, some military officers, and journalists flew to Joateca to retrieve it. In an interview, Monterrosa stated that "the myth of Morazán is over", in reference to the Radio Venceremos transmitter. Monterrosa invited domestic and foreign news outlets to view the captured transmitter in San Miguel. The FMLN ceased broadcasts of Radio Venceremos while the Salvadoran Army had the rigged transmitter in their possession leading the Armed Forces of El Salvador and press to believe that Radio Venceremos had actually been captured.

=== Flight and crash ===
On 23 October 1984, Monterrosa boarded a Salvadoran Air Force-owned Bell UH-1H (numbered 284) along with the rigged radio transmitter at Joateca, and the flight would transport them to San Francisco Gotera, the capital of Morazán. The bomb exploded shortly after takeoff around 4:50 p.m. CST. The explosion killed all 14 people on board the helicopter and it crashed near the El Salvador–Honduras border. Among those killed included Monterrosa, Lieutenant Colonel Napoleón Herson Calitto (commander of the Morazán garrison), Major Armando Azmitia (Monterrosa's successor as commander of the Atlácatl Battalion), Major Nelson Alejandro Rivas, three pilots with the rank of sub-lieutenant, two artillery soldiers, three members of the Armed Forces Press Committee, one priest, and one sacristan. Monterrosa was last seen sitting on top of the rigged transmitter as the helicopter took off.

A helicopter that was evacuating medical personnel from Perquín was diverted by the 3rd Brigade to the scene of the crash. Another helicopter arrived from the Ilopango Air Base and evacuated them from the area. The Salvadoran military guarded the crash site to ensure that the FMLN could not plant explosives inside the wreckage.

== Aftermath ==
=== Investigation ===
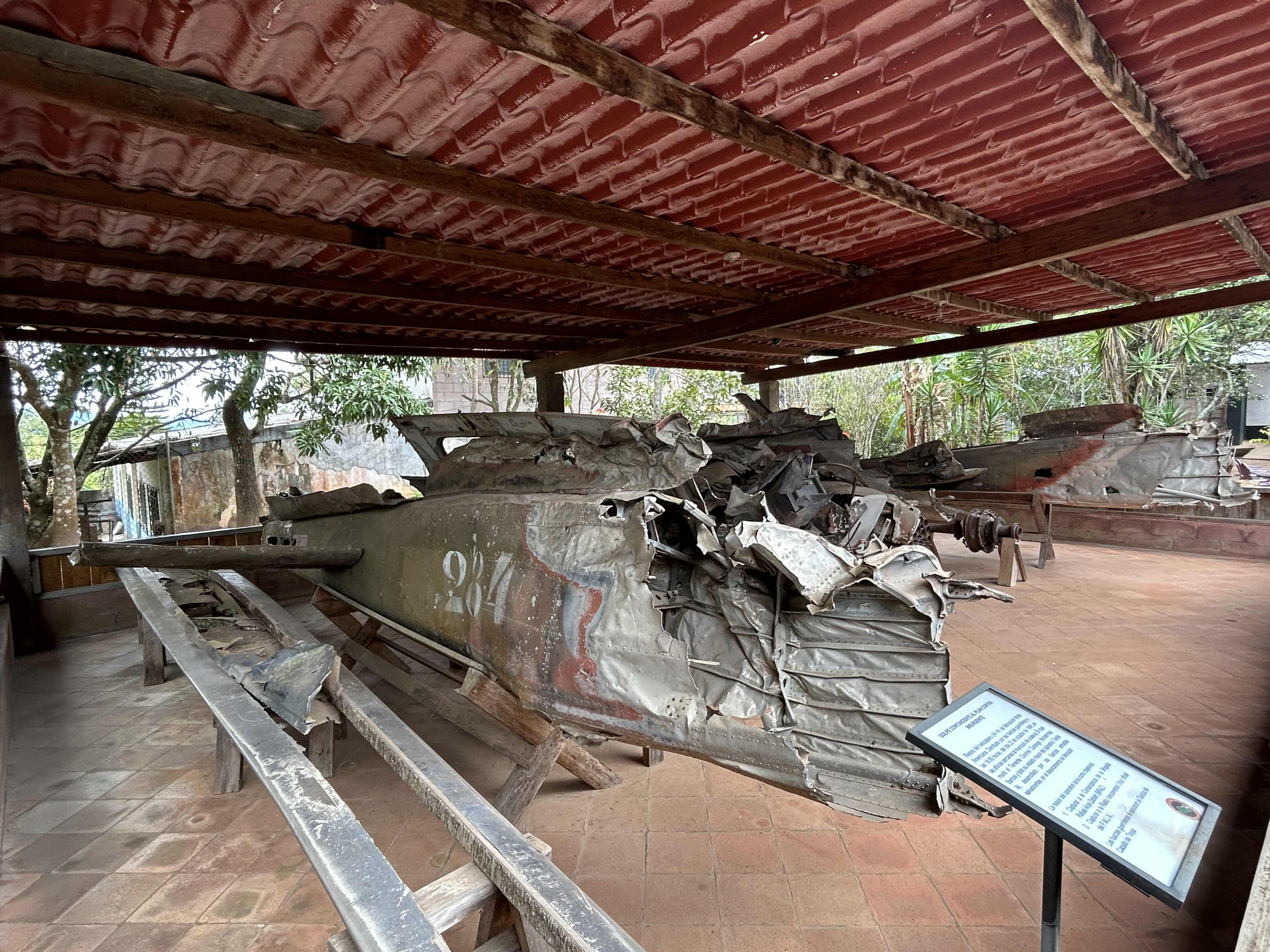
The wreckage of the destroyed helicopter at the Museum of the Revolution in Perquín, El Salvador

The day after the crash, Salvadoran president José Napoleón Duarte called for an investigation to determine whether the crash was caused by a mechanical failure or by an FMLN attack. Duarte and the Salvadoran military believed that the crash was "almost certainly" caused by a "mechanical failure" as three army officers stated that the helicopter's pilot reported that it was experiencing a mechanical problem prior to the crash. Meanwhile, the FMLN claimed that it had shot down the helicopter with a heavy machine gun, that they struck the rotors and gas tank causing the helicopter to explode. The FMLN's claim was made over renewed Radio Venceremos broadcasts.

Military investigators found the helicopter's primary rotor completely detached from the fuselage. They found that parts of the fuselage under the rotor had "black powder residue" ("residuos de pólvora negra") consistent with signs of an explosion. Investigators initially determined that the explosion occurred in the "hell hole" in the lower portion of the helicopter. By late November 1984, the Salvadoran military officially determined that a bomb brought down the helicopter due to damage patterns on the helicopter and the conditions of the bodies recovered.

=== Reactions ===
FMLN commander Joaquín Villalobos stated that "We aren't going to celebrate the death of a man. We're going to celebrate the people who'll live now that he's gone!" He further added that Monterrosa was killed in revenge for the El Mozote massacre. The Armed Forces of El Salvador began referring to those killing in the bombing as "the Heroes of Joateca" ("los Héroes de Joateca"). The 3rd Brigade was named after Monterrosa until 2019 when President Nayib Bukele ordered his name to be removed from the unit due to the controversy regarding Monterrosa's human rights abuses.

An official from the United States embassy in San Salvador stated that the helicopter crash and Monterrosa's death were a "major setback for El Salvador [...] It happened just when things seemed to be going well." The Salvadoran Army named Lieutenant Colonel Miguel Méndez as Monterrosa's successor as overall commander in eastern El Salvador. Monterrosa's funeral was held in San Salvador, El Salvador's capital city, on 27 October 1984.

=== Wreckage ===
The wreckage of Monterrosa's bombed Bell UH-1H is located at the Museum of the Revolution in Perquín along with the wreckages of four other helicopters. Author Ignacio Sarmiento described the wreckage as a war trophy for the FMLN.

== See also ==
- Bell UH-1 Iroquois in Salvadoran service
- List of accidents and incidents involving helicopters
