= Joe Sanderson =

American adventurer (1942-1982)

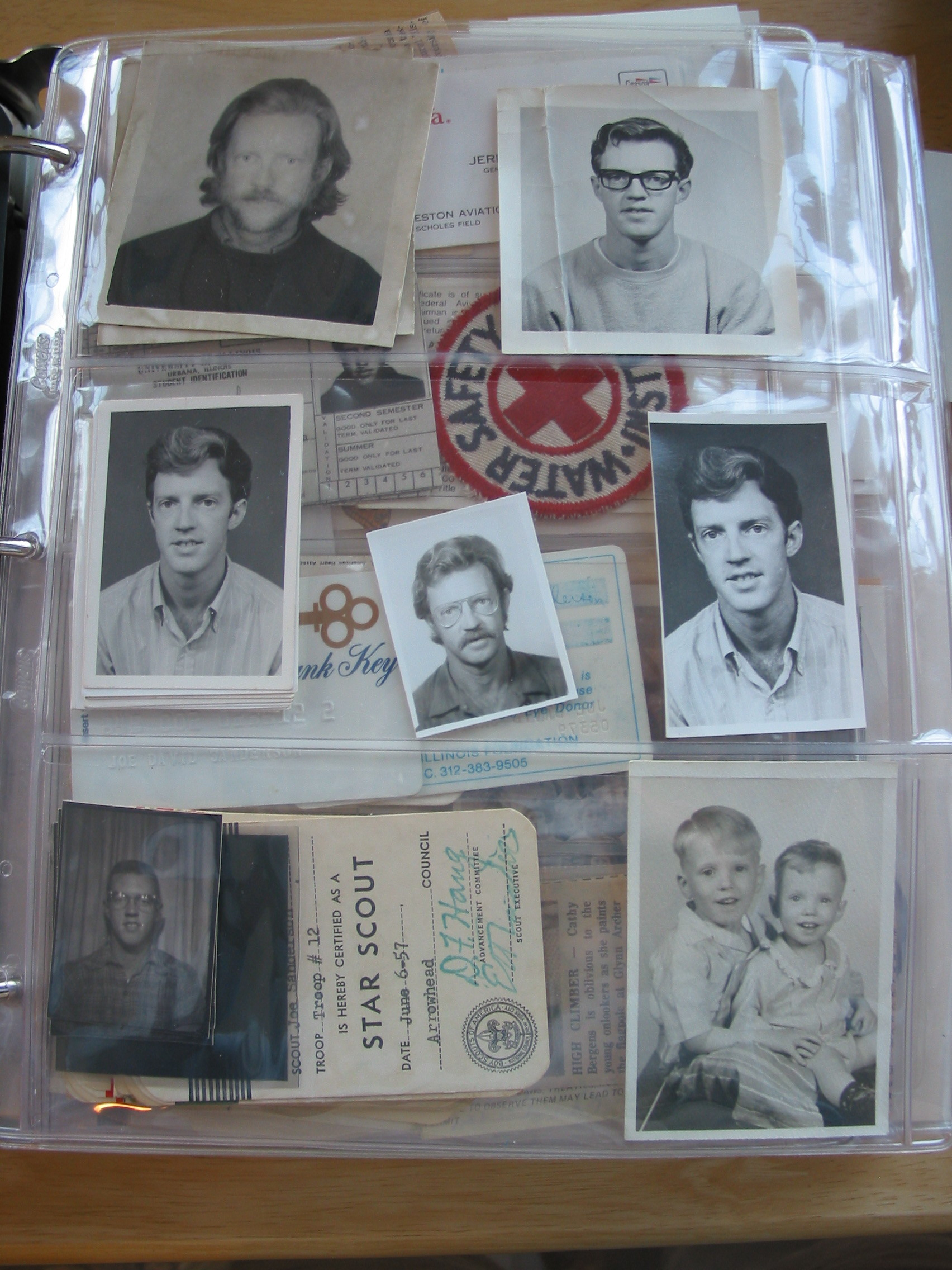
- Born: May 14, 1942; Fayetteville, Arkansas, U.S.
- Died: April 27, 1982 (aged 39); Morazán, El Salvador
- Occupation: Writer

Joe Sanderson (May 14, 1942 – April 27, 1982) was an adventurer from Urbana, Illinois who was one of two Americans to be killed in combat while fighting with leftist rebels during the Salvadoran Civil War. He traveled across more than 70 countries between 1960 and 1982, and is the subject of the novel The Last Great Road Bum by Héctor Tobar.

== Life ==
Sanderson was born the son of Milt Sanderson, a University of Illinois entomologist, and Virginia Colman, a university accountant. He was raised in Urbana, Illinois, and at one point in his childhood was a neighbor and friend of the future film critic Roger Ebert; both men were graduates of the class of 1960 at Urbana High School. After briefly attending the University of Florida and Hannover College, Sanderson dropped out of college and began two decades of journeys "road bumming" around the world. In Jamaica in 1962, he briefly camped with Rastafarian activists (who were then the subject of continual police harassment).

After backpacking and hitchhiking and taking boats across the Americas, Sanderson worked with the International Red Cross in Nigeria during the Biafran War in 1967. He was in Vietnam a few months after the Tet Offensive, posing as an aid worker and journalist, and traveled through Yemen during the North Yemen Civil War. In Kisangani, Democratic Republic of Congo, he met the white mercenaries who had been hired by the government to fight the warriors of the Simba Rebellion. And in Bolivia, he launched a hospital for the poor in the town of Sorata, but was detained by the authorities during the René Barrientos dictatorship.

Sanderson traveled to El Salvador in 1980; by now a fluent Spanish-speaker, he made contact with underground operatives of the People's Revolutionary Army, one of the armed groups that would later be allied in the Farabundo Martí National Liberation Front. Among the rebels, Sanderson took the nom de guerre "Lucas," and came to be known for his excellent shooting skills. He was with a rebel column that marched into the hamlet of El Mozote, weeks after government troops massacred an estimated 1,000 people there. The New York Times journalist Raymond Bonner interviewed him in his reporting on the events at El Mozote and their aftermath. Sanderson told Bonner he was a wandering American writer working on a novel about the Salvadoran revolution. He also worked with the rebel's Radio Venceremos station, as a photographer; and in one combat encounter with the Salvadoran army he killed at least two government soldiers.

On April 27, 1982, Sanderson was wounded by mortar fire as he attempted to capture a 50-caliber army machine gun. The founder of Radio Venceremos, Carlos Henríquez Consalvi, was with Sanderson when he died of his wounds some hours later; Sanderson was buried by the rebels near the Sapo river.
