= María Cristina Gómez =

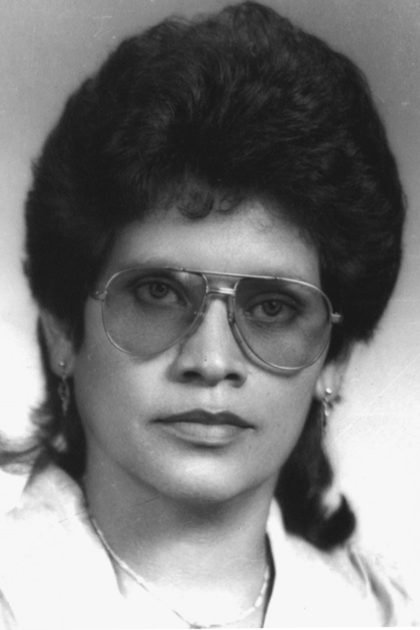
María Cristina Gómez, human rights leader in El Salvador

María Cristina Gómez (5 May 1942 – 5 April 1989) was a Baptist primary school teacher and community leader in El Salvador who was abducted and murdered on 5 April 1989.

== Christian Mission ==
A copy of the 'Maria Gómez Cross' showing scenes from her life

A member of Emmanuel Baptist church in San Salvador, Gómez was a national leader both of Baptist women and in the teachers' union. She was a founder of the National Coordination of Salvadoran Women (CONAMUS), an organization of women founded in 1986. Since then, CONAMUS has addressed the issues which directly affect poor women in El Salvador, including domestic violence and rape, economic survival, lack of political participation, and social inequality. In 1989 CONAMUS opened a clinic to respond to women who were victims of domestic violence and rape. In her spare time Gómez went out into the local villages and taught the peasant women how to read. She did this so that they in turn could teach their children how to read but also so that they could read health and farming leaflets in order to improve the quality of their lives. However, some in authority became concerned that the previously illiterate peasants would now be able to read about their rights, and would begin to demand them. She was found dead on the side of the road after being abducted.

== Abduction and murder ==
According to witnesses, on April 5, 1989, as Gómez was returning from the John F. Kennedy School in Ilopango, El Salvador, heavily armed men dressed in civilian clothing forced her into a van. Two hours later she was found dead on the side of a main road. On examination, her body showed signs of torture and burns, most likely caused by chemicals such as acid; she had been beaten in the face, and acid marks on her shoulders were found. There were four bullets in her indicating that she had been shot.

The murdered teacher had been taken from an area that was the operational base for the Salvadoran Air Force. General Juan Rafael Bustillo, the then-head of the Salvadoran Air Force, has been implicated in the murder. The National Association of Salvadoran Educators (ANDES) has stated that General Bustillo had publicly threatened Gómez on previous occasions.

ANDES ordered a two-day shutdown of all educational activities to protest Gómez's murder and demanded that the country's chief prosecutor begin proceedings to bring those responsible to justice. Leaders of the National Union of Salvadorean Workers (UNTS) also said they believed Bustillo had ordered the killing.

An organisation known as the Movement for Bread, Work, Land and Liberty (MPTL) staged a protest, calling on the people to resist the new nationwide wave of repression that marked the weeks following the Nationalist Republican Alliance's (ARENA) electoral victory. The protesters ended their march at the vigil that was held for the murdered schoolteacher.

In its defense, the Salvadoran government denied any involvement, stating instead that the apparent intent behind Gómez's abduction and murder was primarily to discredit the Air Force (which is in charge of the area in which the murder occurred). Government officials added that Gómez had never been officially arrested by any government agency, and that she had never even been questioned by the authorities.

== Legacy ==
After her death, her church commissioned a local artist to paint a wooden cross with scenes from Gómez's life, portraying her work among the poor women of El Salvador. Images of this cross have become internationally recognized, as they are used by churches and schools around the world to tell the story of Gómez's life and death.

Gómez was married to Salvador Amaya and had four grown children.
