= Lee Sanderson =

English rugby league footballer

Personal information
- Full name: Lee Sanderson
- Born: 16 December 1981 (age 43) Salford, Greater Manchester, England

Playing information
- Height: 5 ft 7 in (1.70 m)
- Weight: 12 st 6 lb (79 kg)
- Position: Scrum-half, Hooker
Club
Years	Team	Pld	T	G	FG	P
2001–03	Leigh Centurions	32	11	38	0	120
2002(loan)	→ St Helens	0	0	0	0	0
2004–05	London Broncos	7	1	7	0	18
2005(loan)	→ London Skolars
2006	Rochdale Hornets
2007	Oldham	8	1	20	0	44
	Total	47	13	65	0	182

Lee Sanderson (born 16 December 1981) is a former professional rugby league footballer who played as a scrum-half for the Leigh Centurions, London Broncos, Oldham and the Rochdale Hornets. He also spent time on loan from Leigh at St Helens in the European Super League, and from the Broncos at the London Skolars in National League Two.

== Background ==
Sanderson was born in Salford, Greater Manchester, England on 16 December 1981. Daughter is Jazmin Greenwood.

== Leigh Centurions ==
He played for Leigh East and Leigh Miners as a junior and joined the Leigh Centurions as a professional, featuring in a number of friendlies in 2000. In 2001 he made his debut for the club in the Northern Ford Premiership, scoring four tries against Hunslet in the process. As a teenager he won the 2001 Northern Ford Premiership with the Centurions. Following a broken jaw he received in 2002, he spent time on loan at St Helens.

== London Broncos ==
Sanderson was brought to London ahead of the 2004 Super League season, with the side from the capital paying a transfer fee to take him from Hilton Park. His 2004 season was disrupted by injury. He had knee reconstruction surgery in January 2005 ahead of the 2005 Super League season. In 2005, after undergoing major surgery on his knee, he spent time on loan from the Broncos at the London Skolars in National League Two. He did not take the field for the Broncos first team in 2005 and was released at the end of his contract in 2005.

== Rochdale Hornets ==
He was out of the game for 18 months with a serious injury before joining the Rochdale Hornets.

== Oldham ==
He later played for Oldham.

== Personal life ==
His father, Mark Sanderson also played for Rochdale, and Lee's grandfather Bill Sanderson and great-grandfather Joe Sanderson both played for Leigh in the 1930s and 1950s respectively. Lee's uncle Ian Sanderson also played for the Roughyeds.
