= La Palabra =

La Palabra (Spanish for The Word) may refer to:

- La Palabra (musician), Cuban bandleader, singer-songwriter, pianist, record producer, and arranger
- La Palabra, a magazine founded by Catholic martyr Anacleto González Flores
- "La Palabra", an episode on The West Wing (season 6)
- La Palabra 1490, former radio station in Austin, Texas, now KJFK
- palabra, an online magazine published by the National Association of Hispanic Journalists

== See also ==
- Museo de la Palabra y la Imagen, located in San Salvador, El Salvador
- Las palabras de Max, 1978 Spanish film
- La tercera palabra, 1955 Mexican film
