= The Last Great Road Bum =

2020 novel by Héctor Tobar

- Author: Héctor Tobar
- Publisher: Farrar, Straus and Giroux
- Publication date: August 25, 2020
- Pages: 416
- ISBN: 978-0-374-18342-4

The Last Great Road Bum is a novel by Héctor Tobar. The book is an fictionalized account of Joe Sanderson's life.

The book is set in the 1960s through the 1980s, focusing on Sanderson's travels. The book ends with Sanderson's death in 1982 as a guerrilla fighter in the Salvadoran Civil War.

Héctor Tobar, serving at the time as the Mexico City bureau chief for the Los Angeles Times first came across Sanderson's papers in an encounter with a researcher from San Salvador, who told Tobar about his diary, which had been preserved by archivists. Tobar would later contact Sanderson's brother, Steve, who would give Tobar access to the family's collection of mail from Sanderson. Tobar initially tried to write it as non-fiction, but later wrote it as a novel.

Throughout the book, Sanderson travels throughout the Middle East, Africa, Asia, and Central America, in the pursuit of writing an novel about his experiences, which he describes as akin to an Great American Novel.
