= Héctor Tobar =

American journalist (born 1963)

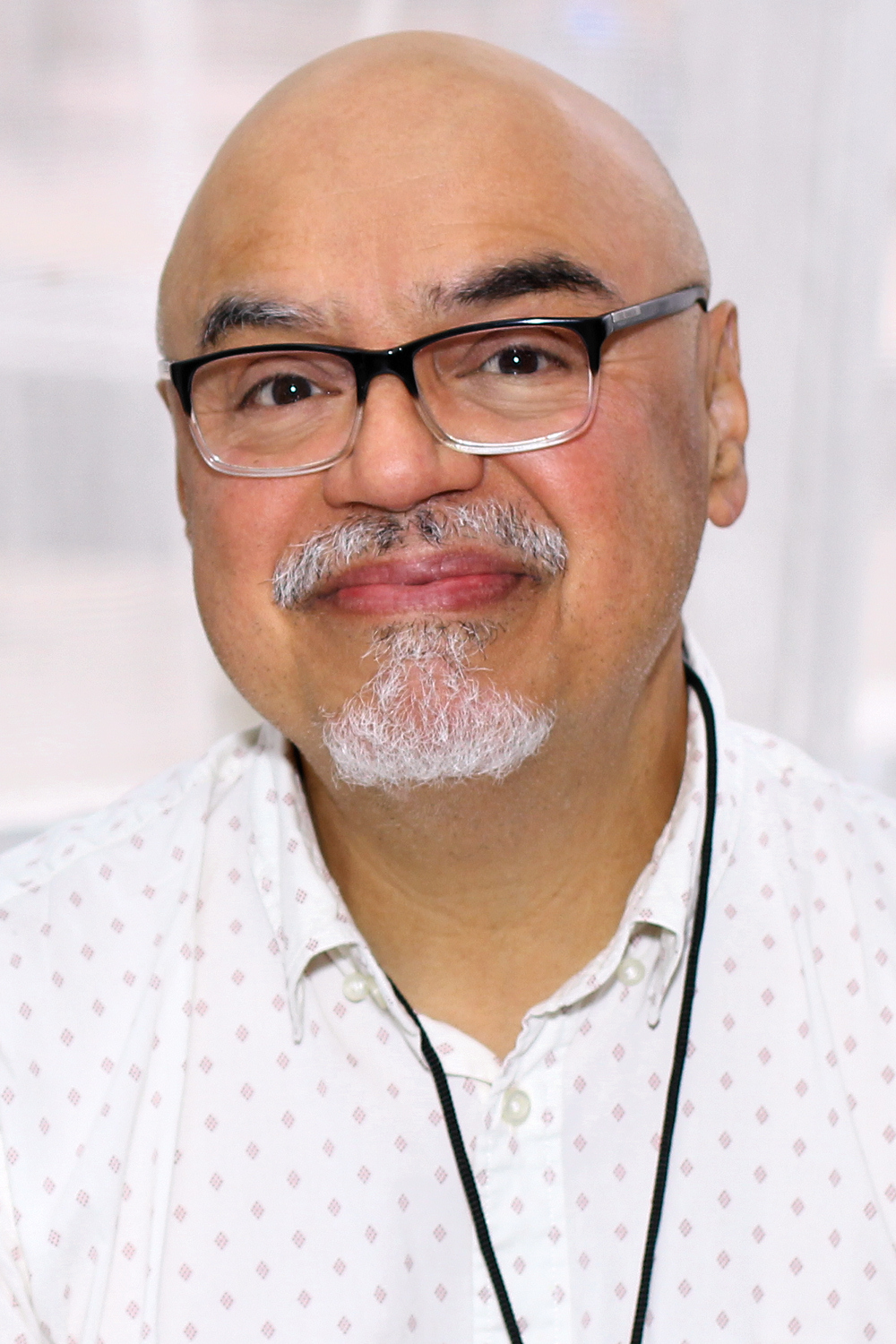
- Tobar at the 2023 Texas Book Festival
- Born: 1963 (age 62–63); Los Angeles, California, U.S.
- Education: University of California, Santa Cruz; University of California, Irvine
- Occupations: Author, journalist
- Website: www.hectortobar.com

Héctor Tobar (born 1963) is a Los Angeles author, novelist, and journalist, whose work examines the evolving and interdependent relationship between Latin America, Latino immigrants, and the United States. In 2023, he was named a Guggenheim Fellow in Fiction.

== Life ==
Tobar was born in Los Angeles, the son of Guatemalan immigrants. He is a graduate of the University of California, Santa Cruz, and the MFA program in Creative Writing at the University of California, Irvine.

His long career in journalism includes work for The New Yorker, LA Weekly, and many positions at the Los Angeles Times. He was a Metro columnist for The Times, a book critic, and the paper's bureau chief in Mexico City and in Buenos Aires, Argentina. He also worked for several years as the National Latino Affairs Correspondent. Additionally, Tobar contributed to the newspaper's Pulitzer Prize-winning coverage of the Los Angeles riots of 1992.

Tobar is the author of The Tattooed Soldier, a novel set in the impoverished immigrant neighborhoods of Los Angeles in the weeks before the riots, and in Guatemala during the years of military dictatorship there. His non-fiction Translation Nation: Defining a New American Identity in the Spanish-Speaking United States, is a cross-country journey with stops in many of the new places where Latin American immigrants are settling, including Rupert, Idaho; Grand Island, Nebraska; and Memphis, Tennessee. His third book, The Barbarian Nurseries, is a sweeping novel about class and ethnic conflict in modern Southern California: it was named a New York Times Notable Book for 2011 and won the 2012 California Book Award gold medal for fiction. In 2023, a Los Angeles Times poll of California writers named The Barbarian Nurseries alongside works by Joan Didion, Thomas Pynchon, and others, as one of the 16 best literary novels in Los Angeles history.

In 2006, Tobar was named one of the 100 Most Influential Hispanics in the United States by Hispanic Business magazine.

During the 2010 Copiapó mining accident, while still trapped in the mine, the 33 miners chose to collectively contract with a single author to write an official history so that none of the 33 could individually profit from the experiences of others. The miners chose Héctor Tobar, who was then provided exclusive access to the miners' stories. In October 2014, he published an official account titled Deep Down Dark: The Untold Stories of 33 Men Buried in a Chilean Mine, and the Miracle That Set Them Free. It was a finalist for the 2014 National Book Critics Circle Award (General Nonfiction). His 2020 novel The Last Great Road Bum is a fictionalized account of the life of Joe Sanderson, an adventurer from Urbana, Illinois, who was one of two Americans to die fighting with leftist rebels in El Salvador.

Tobar has been an adjunct professor at Loyola Marymount University and Pomona College, was an assistant professor at the University of Oregon's school of journalism and communication, and is currently a professor at the University of California, Irvine.

== Writing ==
Tobar's The Tattooed Soldier was published in 1998. Eric Vázquez in "Interrogative Justice in Hector Tobar's The Tattooed Soldier" writes of it: "Much of this scholarship stresses the novel's pertinence to a demand for the [US] representation of the Central American diaspora. Consequently, in adopting cultural recognition as a precept, these Latinx literary critics often interpret the novel as an allegory for the diaspora’s success or failure to achieve recognition and inclusion within the broader polity. For critic and novelist Arturo Arias, the novel and its characters express the null space of Central American cultural and social identity within US multiculturalism." This interpretation of the novel reflects the valuable implications it serves for the Central American Community.

== Works ==
=== Novels ===
- The Tattooed Soldier (1998), Delphinium Books, Penguin Books, ISBN 978-1-883285-15-9
- The Barbarian Nurseries (2011), Farrar, Straus and Giroux
- The Last Great Road Bum (2020), Farrar, Straus and Giroux

=== Short stories ===
- "Secret Stream" (The Best American Short Stories 2016), originally published in Zyzzyva, Issue 103.
- "The Sins of Others" (The Best American Short Stories 2022), originally published in Zyzzyva, Issue 120.

=== Non-fiction ===
- Translation Nation: Defining a New American Identity in the Spanish-Speaking United States (2005), Riverhead Books, ISBN 978-1-57322-305-8, sociology
- Deep Down Dark: The Untold Stories of 33 Men Buried in a Chilean Mine, and the Miracle That Set Them Free, or The 33 (2014), Farrar, Straus and Giroux, ISBN 978-0-374-28060-4
- Our Migrant Souls: A Meditation on the Meanings and Myths of 'Latino', ISBN 978-0-374-60990-0

== Awards and honors ==
- 2011: California Book Awards Gold Medal Fiction winner for The Barbarian Nurseries
- 2014: California Book Awards Silver Medal Nonfiction winner for Deep Down Dark
- 2021: Radcliffe Fellowship, Harvard University
- 2023: Guggenheim Fellowship, Fiction
- 2023: Kirkus Prize, nonfiction winner, for Our Migrant Souls

== Adaptations ==
- The 33 (2015), film directed by Patricia Riggen, based on Deep Down Dark: The Untold Stories of 33 Men Buried in a Chilean Mine, and the Miracle That Set Them Free
