= Juan Rafael Bustillo =

Salvadoran military officer (born 1935)

Juan Rafael Bustillo (born January 31, 1935) is a former general and chief of the Salvadoran Air Force who is accused of planning the murder of six Jesuit priests, a housekeeper and her daughter at the Universidad Centroamericana "José Simeón Cañas" (UCA) in El Salvador on November 16, 1989.

Bustillo was born in San Miguel in 1935 to John and Elena Toledo Bustillo. He entered the Salvadoran Military Academy on February 1, 1954, and was promoted to lieutenant in 1962, Captain in 1966, major in 1972, lieutenant colonel in 1976, colonel in 1980 and general in 1984.

Bustillo is wanted in France for torturing, raping and murdering 27-year-old Madeleine Lagadec in El Salvador in 1989. Her raped, bullet-riddled body was found with its left hand severed.

As the head of the Salvadoran Air Force, Bustillo oversaw the Contras' operation of importing weapons into Nicaragua that were paid for by crack cocaine smuggled into the United States. He is also accused of ordering Air Force officials to torture and murder members of the teachers union in El Salvador, including Maria Cristina Gomez.

On November 13, 2008, The Center for Justice and Accountability (CJA) filed a criminal case in Madrid in Spain against former Salvadoran military officials, including Bustillo, for their role in the Jesuits Massacre of 1989. The CJA and their colleagues with the Spanish Association for Human Rights (APDHE) jointly filed the case as prosecutors in the Spanish National Court, using Spain’s universal jurisdiction law. On January 13, 2009, the 14 officers and soldiers named in the case were formally charged with crimes against humanity and state terrorism.

Bustillo resides in El Salvador.
