= Museo de la Palabra y la Imagen =

War museum in San Salvador, El Salvador

Museum of the Word and the Image
- Museo de la Palabra y la Imagen
- Established: 1990s
- Location: San Salvador, El Salvador
- Coordinates: 13.7093°N 89.2049°W
- Founder: Carlos Henríquez Consalvi

The Museo de la Palabra y la Imagen (Spanish for Museum of the Word and the Image) is a museum located in San Salvador, El Salvador. It was founded in the late 1990s by the Venezuelan journalist Carlos Henríquez Consalvi as a museum dedicated to collecting and preserving memories of the Salvadoran civil war, incorporating memories across the political spectrum. The general enthusiasm of the public quickly prompted the MUPI to expand and it now includes a variety of exhibits that deal with various moments in the nation's past.

== Projects ==
One of its projects has been the production of the documentary Cicatriz de la Memoria (Scars of Memory) with U.S. historian Jeffrey Gould regarding the 1932 Salvadoran peasant uprising. Integral to the project was the idea of the "cine-forum," in which the MUPI took the documentary "on tour" throughout the country and abroad, organizing screenings in community centers, schools, and universities, followed by lively discussion sessions. More recently, the MUPI has worked in an exhibit regarding the memory of the massacre of El Mozote, and has also worked in collaboration with the art museum MARTE in a joint exhibit about the acclaimed Salvadoran writer and artist, Salarrué.

== Archives ==
The MUPI has an impressive archive that includes historical photographs, manuscripts, and video recordings:

- Movie archive: considered El Salvador's most important audiovisual archive including takes from the Salvadoran civil war, Salvadoran productions (Baltazar Polio, Alejandro Coto, Guillermo Escalón, etc.) and registers about literature, history, folklore, etc. This archive is used for audiovisual productions, TV programs or educative products.
- Photo archive: contains more than 35,000 images dating from 1872 until present. Most important themes are:
  - Images about indigenous culture. 1896
  - 1932 Salvadoran peasant uprising.
  - Armed conflict 1980 - 1992.
  - Personalities collection: Masferrer, Claudia Lars, Roque Dalton, Monseñor Romero, María de Baratta, etc.
  - Kabrakan collection: Images about natural phenomenon in El Salvador: earthquakes, eruptions, tsunami and floodings.
  - Women's collection: Prudencia Ayala, Amparo Casamalhuapa, etc.
  - History collection: important events in El Salvador.
- Audio archive: conserves Radio Venceremos transmissions as well as recordings about cultural and contemporary history themes including personalities voices and testimony about human rights or Women's rights in El Salvador.
- Social Science library: especialized in historic investigation and social sciences about El Salvador and Central America.

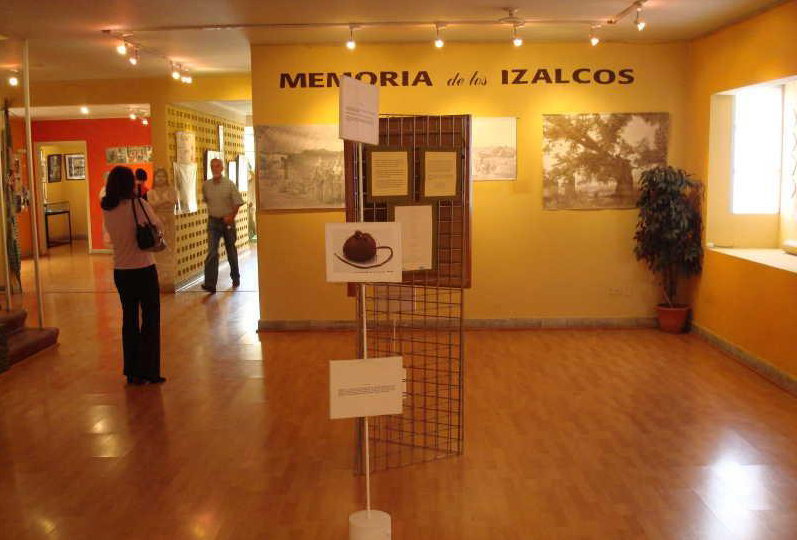
Una sala de exposición

== Local in San Salvador ==
The museum owns a building in the capital and organizes exhibitions about identity, culture and historic memory. It has various exhibition halls as well as a cinema hall and produces books, audiovisual works and many educational and cultural activities.
