= Museum of the Revolution (El Salvador) =

Coordinates: 13.6925°N 89.2418°W

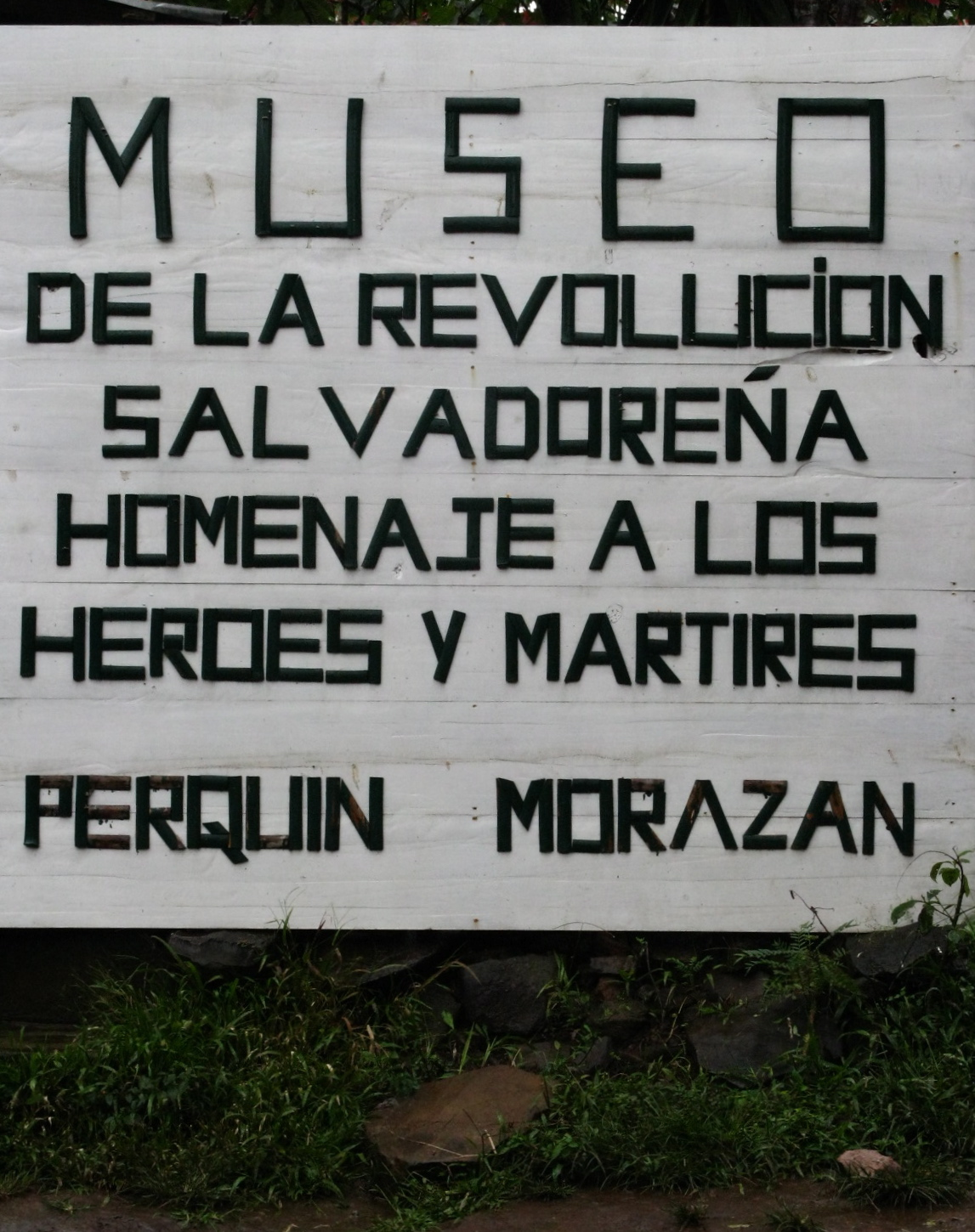
- Location: Perquín, Morazán Department, El Salvador
- Type: History museum

Museum of the Revolution (Spanish: Museo de la Revolución) is a museum commemorating the antecedents and events of the Salvadoran Civil War that took place from 1979 to 1992. The museum is located in Perquín, in the Morazán Department of El Salvador. This area was dominated during the war by the Farabundo Martí National Liberation Front (FMLN).

The museum includes an exhibit honoring the FMLN's radio network, Radio Venceremos, as well as the weaponry used during the war years and a downed helicopter that had carried military leader Lt. Colonel Domingo Monterrosa Barrios, a leader of the Atlácatl Battalion. An additional outdoor exhibit shows the crater created by a 500-pound (230 kg) U.S.-made bomb, together with a disarmed example of such a bomb. Former members of the guerrilla staff the exhibits and answer guests' questions.
