= Domingo Monterrosa =

Salvadoran military officer (1940–1984)

Lieutenant Colonel Domingo Monterrosa
- Born: José Domingo Monterrosa Barrios; 4 August 1940; Berlín, El Salvador
- Died: 23 October 1984 (aged 44); Joateca, El Salvador
- Cause of death: Helicopter crash
- Education: Captain General Gerardo Barrios Military School; School of the Americas
- Military career
- Allegiance: El Salvador
- Branch: Salvadoran Army
- Service years: 1963–1984
- Rank: Lieutenant colonel
- Commands: Atlácatl Battalion
- Known for: El Mozote massacre
- Conflicts: Football War; Salvadoran Civil War X

José Domingo Monterrosa Barrios (4 August 1940 – 23 October 1984) was a military commander of the Armed Forces of El Salvador during the Salvadoran Civil War, responsible for the El Mozote murders. He was killed in a helicopter crash when a bomb planted by the Farabundo Martí National Liberation Front in a radio transmitter detonated over Joateca.

== Early life ==
José Domingo Monterrosa Barrios was born on 4 August 1940 in Berlín, Usulután, El Salvador. Monterrosa graduated from the Captain General Gerardo Barrios Military School in 1963 and attended the School of the Americas in 1966.

== Military career ==
In 1969, Monterrosa participated in the Football War against Honduras.

In 1980, he was assigned to become the leader of the Atlácatl Battalion, comprising El Salvador's elite soldiers. The Atlácatl Battalion was held responsible for committing the El Mozote massacre in 1981. Monterrosa was allegedly seen arriving by helicopter by a local guide prior to the start of the massacre, as told by reporter Mark Danner. However, Danner also reported that Monterrosa had been contacted by a U.S. military advisor to share the outcome of the battle that had taken place in El Mozote, a village located north of Morazán. At that point, Monterrosa was in the Atlácatl's headquarters. According to Danner's story, after the conversation with the U.S. advisor, Monterrosa boarded a helicopter and headed to Morazán. The Washington Post reported in 2007 that Monterrosa had ordered the massacre.

Monterrosa was known to be obsessed with destroying the pro-rebel Radio Venceremos, which "specialized in ideological propaganda, acerbic commentary, and pointed ridicule of the government". Monterrosa was a supporter of President José Napoleón Duarte's efforts to hold peace talks in 1984, and his death seriously weakened them.

== Death ==
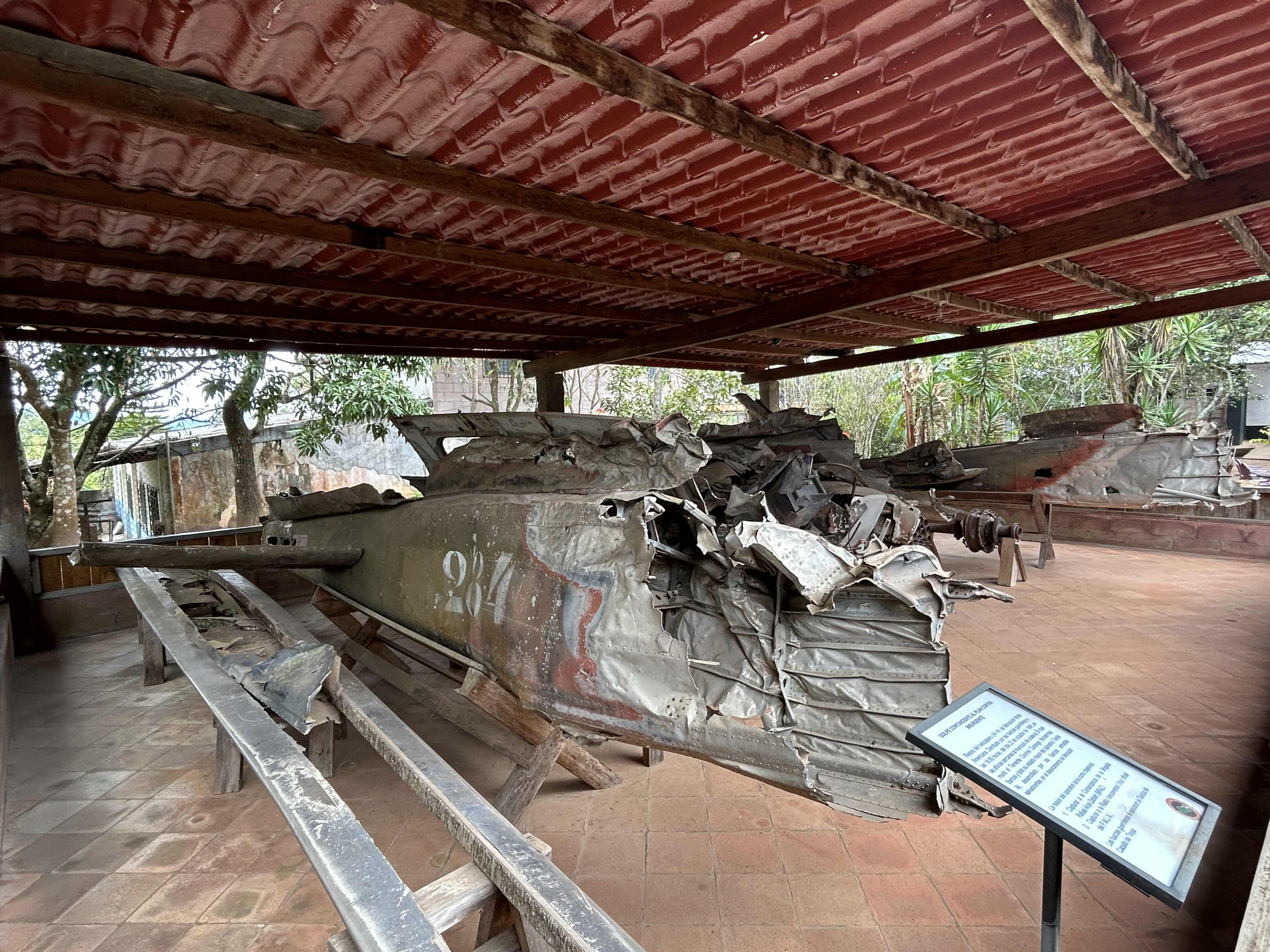
The wreckage of Monterrosa's helicopter at the Museum of the Revolution

The Farabundo Martí National Liberation Front set a booby trap in a fake rebel radio transmitter that Monterrosa took with him as a victory trophy. The bomb went off while he was in flight; the bombing and crash killed all 14 people on board the aircraft, including Monterrosa. Remnants of his helicopter can be found in the Museum of the Revolution in Perquín, Morazán Department.

== Legacy ==
The Military Museum of the Armed Forces of El Salvador designated a special section for Monterrosa. After his death, the Legislative Assembly of El Salvador honored Monterrosa with the title of "Hero of Joateca" and declared him a national hero for his service to the country.

In 2019, the Salvadoran president Nayib Bukele ordered the removal of Monterrosa's name from one of the main military units of the Salvadoran Army. Years earlier, another Salvadoran president, Mauricio Funes, asked for forgiveness from the state and the people of El Salvador for the crimes committed by state actors during the civil war, and directed the army to review their behavior in those years.
