= Carlos Henríquez Consalvi =

Venezuelan author, journalist, radio producer and museum director

Carlos Henríquez Consalvi, alias Santiago is a Venezuelan author, journalist, radio producer and museum director.

== Life ==
=== Youth and study ===
Consalvi was born in Mérida in 1947. His parents were opponents of the Venezuelan dictatorship, which caused that part of his youth he grew up in Mexico and Costa Rica. In 1958, after the end of this era, the family returned to its home country.

He studied journalism at the Central University of Venezuela. After an earthquake in 1972 devastated Managua in Nicaragua greatly, Consalvi traveled with a group of young people to the Nicaraguan capital to help the victims there.

=== Career ===
Consalvi's intense interest in history brought him for research in archives in Paris, Madrid and Rome. Afterwards he went to Nicaragua for research of Central America in the 19th century. He was here as well, when Pedro Joaquín Chamorro Cardenal, the owner of the paper La Prensa, was killed in 1978. There-upon Consalvi started to write editorial articles on human rights in the country for this paper.

After the fall of the Somoza family in 1979 and at the beginning of the government of the sandinists, Consalvi moved to El Salvador where he founded Radio Venceremos in 1980, an underground radio station that counterbalanced the news emissions of the Salvadoran government during the civil war (1980–1991). On this period he later wrote his book La Terquedad del Izote.

Realizing the importance of the memory of cultural history for the reconstruction of a society, in 1996 he founded the Museo de la Palabra y la Imagen. The museum opened its doors in 1999 and preserves a unique collection of films, photographs, writings and objects on the culture and history of El Salvador. With the museum he holds the objective to promote human rights, social justice and peace.

Furthermore, Consalvi wrote several novels and a great number of literary narrations. He produced audiovisual work, among which the documentary films 1932, cicatriz de la memoria, "La palabra en el bosque", La Frontera del Olvido, and an animated cartoon of the Salvadoran writer Salarrué, called Cuentos de Cipotes.

In 2008 Consalvi was honored with a Prince Claus Award from the Netherlands. The jury rewarded him "for his outstanding work as a broadcaster, for creating spaces of freedom, and for his commitment to the promotion of memory and its active role in the reconstruction of Salvadoran society."

== Work ==
=== Bibliography ===
- 1977: La Muerte los miraba desde el mar, Nicaragua, historical narrative
- 1992: La Terquedad del Izote: La historia de Radio Venceremos, ISBN 978-9992384008, translated into English as Broadcasting the Civil War in El Salvador: A Memoir of Guerrilla Radio, ISBN 978-0292722859
- 1996: Luciérnagas en el Mozote, San Salvador, human rights
- ca. 1997: Tentaciones y Estropicios, historical narratives
- ca 2000 "Ernesto interiano, los mendigos me amaban" historical narratives
- 2006: Morazan: Recuerdos del Futuro, ISBN 978-9992384039
- 2010: Prudencia Ayala: La Hija de la Centella, women rights

=== Expositions ===
- La Huella de la memoria
- Roque Dalton: La palabra del volcán
- Kabrakan, la furia de los Dioses
- El Legado de Salarrué
- Prudencia Ayala, la lucha por los derechos femeninos
- De la Guerra a la Paz
- El Mozote, nunca más
- Memoria de los Izalcos
- Patria Peregrina, Vida y Obra de Pedro Geoffray Rivas
- "1932, insurrección en la oscuridad"
- " Nuestras voces"
- "Mujer, la desnudez de mi lenguaje"
- "Trémula tierra"
