= Battle of Ilopango Airport =

1982 military engagement in El Salvador

- Part of the Salvadoran Civil War
Date	27 January 1982
Location	Ilopango Airport, Ilopango, El Salvador 13°41′30″N 089°07′32″W
Result	FMLN victory

Belligerents
Armed Forces of El Salvador	Farabundo Martí National Liberation Front

Commanders and leaders
Unknown	Alejandro Montenegro

Strength
Unknown	8

Casualties and losses
6 helicopters destroyed 8 aircraft destroyed	Unknown
- Location in El Salvador

The Battle of Ilopango Airport was a military engagement fought at the Ilopango International Airport in El Salvador in late January 1982. The battle was a part of the Salvadoran Civil War. It was fought between soldiers of the Salvadoran Air Force and guerrillas of the Farabundo Martí National Liberation Front.

== Background ==
On 15 October 1979, the Salvadoran Civil War began with a coup being staged against the President, Carlos Humberto Romero. After the coup, the Revolutionary Government Junta of El Salvador was established and in 1980, the Farabundo Martí National Liberation Front engaged in a guerrilla war against the government.

== Battle ==
On the morning of 27 January 1982, 8 FMLN guerrillas led by Alejandro Montenegro entered the Ilopango International Airport, used by the Salvadoran Air Force as a military base, and planted bombs on the air force's aircraft stationed there. The guerrillas' primary goal was to damage infrastructure as to hamper the efforts of the government in stopping the FMLN. As a result, aircraft and helicopters were the primary target of the attack.

The bombs detonated at 1:30 a.m. local time. The attack destroyed six Bell UH-1H Iroquois helicopters, five Dassault Ouragan fighter-bombers, and three Douglas C-47 Skytrain military transport aircraft. The FMLN claimed that it destroyed 28 aircraft, while Minister of Defense José Guillermo García stated that 11 aircraft and 4 helicopters were destroyed. García described the raid as a "terrorist attack".

== Aftermath ==
In February 1982, U.S. president Ronald Reagan signed an executive order that authorized the U.S. military to send $55 million in emergency military aid to the Salvadoran government. The military supplied the Salvadoran Air Force with new Bell UH-1H helicopters as a part of the emergency military aid to replace those destroyed in the Ilopango Airport raid.
