= Joateca =

- District
- Location in El Salvador
- Coordinates: 13°54′N 88°03′W
- Country: El Salvador
- Department: Morazán Department
- Elevation: 2,799 ft (853 m)

Population (2024)
  - District: 3,831
  - Rank: 217th in El Salvador
  - Rural: 3,831

Joateca is a municipality in the Morazán department of El Salvador. It has a population of 4,210.
