= Radio Venceremos =

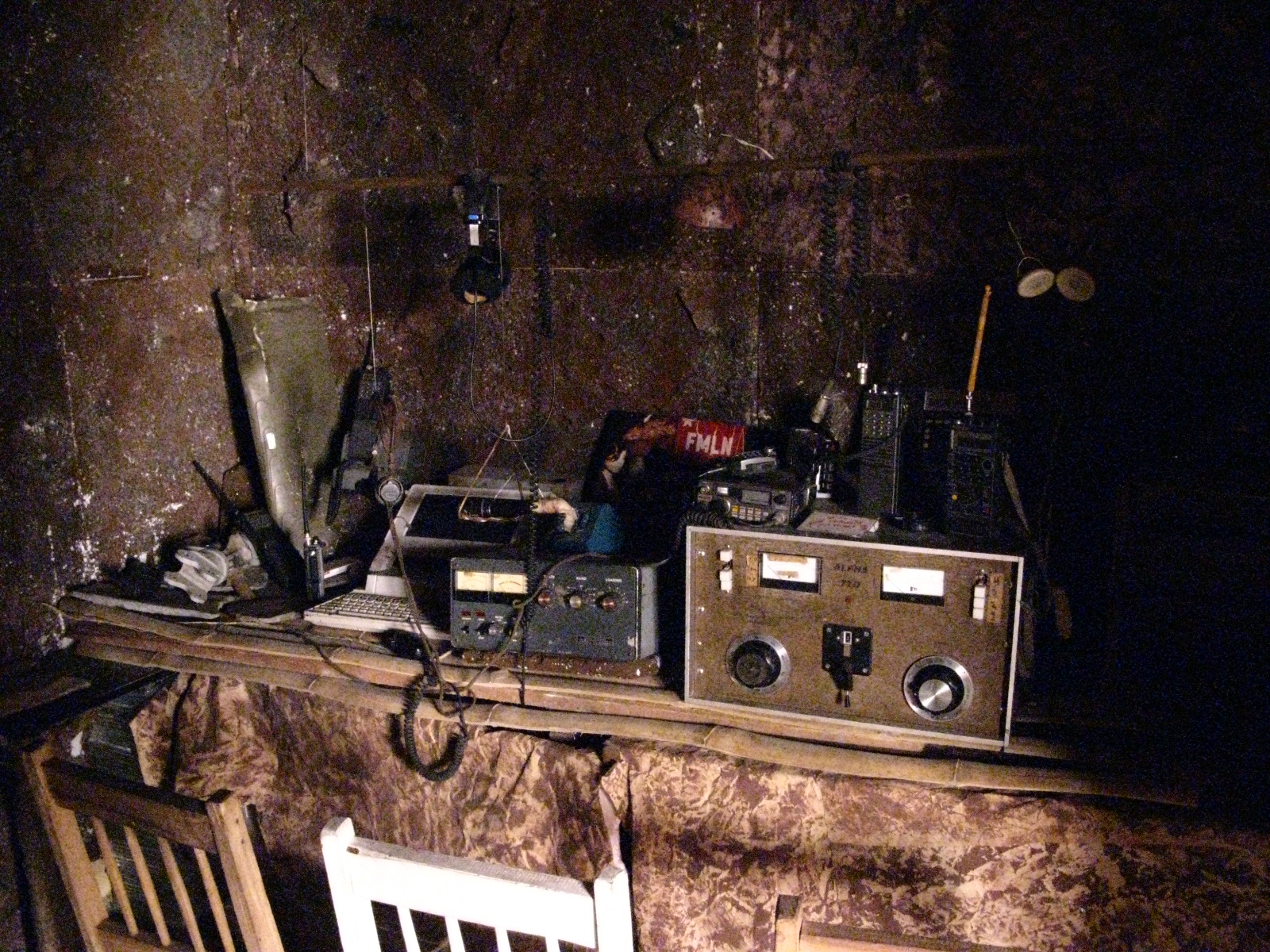
- A reconstruction of Radio Venceremos at the Museo de la Palabra y la Imagen, El Salvador
- El Salvador
- Broadcast area: Morazán Department
- Frequencies: FM, HF

Programming
- Language: Spanish language

Ownership
- Operator: People's Revolutionary Army

History
- First air date: January 10, 1981
- Last air date: 1994

Radio Venceremos (Spanish; in English, "'We Shall Overcome' Radio") was an 'underground' radio network of the anti-government Farabundo Martí National Liberation Front (FMLN) during the Salvadoran Civil War. The station "specialized in ideological propaganda, acerbic commentary, and pointed ridicule of the government". The radio station was founded by Carlos Henríquez Consalvi (Santiago).

Despite the end of the war in 1992, the network continues to broadcast. The war years of the station and its national and international influence were documented in the Spanish-language book Las mil y una historias de radio Venceremos and its English translation, Rebel radio: the story of El Salvador's Radio Venceremos, by the author José Ignacio López Vigil (translator: Mark Fried), a book recorded by the American Library of Congress. An exhibit honoring Radio Venceremos, including a studio room with original equipment, forms a prominent part of the Museum of the Revolution in Perquín, Morazán, El Salvador.

Digitized recordings of the Radio Venceremos broadcasts are freely available online through the Human Rights Documentation Initiative at the LLILAS Benson Latin American Studies and Collections at the University of Texas at Austin.
