= Abimbola Jayeola =

First Nigerian female pilot

Captain Abimbola Jayeola
- Born: Nigeria
- Occupation: helicopter pilot

Abimbola Jayeola is the first Nigerian female helicopter pilot and first Nigerian female to graduate from Bristow Academy.

== Early life and education ==
Abimbola is the oldest of three children and an indigene of Ekiti state, Okemesi Ekiti to be precise. She attended Abeokuta Grammar School. In 2008, she graduated from Bristow Academy in Florida, USA. She earned her FAA certification with JAA and a certificate on the S-76.

== Career ==
In December 2014, Abimbola became the first female helicopter pilot for Bristow Helicopters Nigeria flying the Sikorsky S-76.

In February 2016, Abimbola as the captain of the Bristow helicopter ditched it into the Atlantic Ocean, an action that saved the lives of 11 passengers aboard.

She also flew the 5B BJQ Bristow helicopter which was heading to Lagos from Port Harcourt but ended up ditching it to avert casualties.

In 2017, her name was listed in Leading Ladies Africa (LLA)’s 100 Most Inspiring Women in Nigeria.
