= Bell 212 =

1968 utility helicopter family by Bell

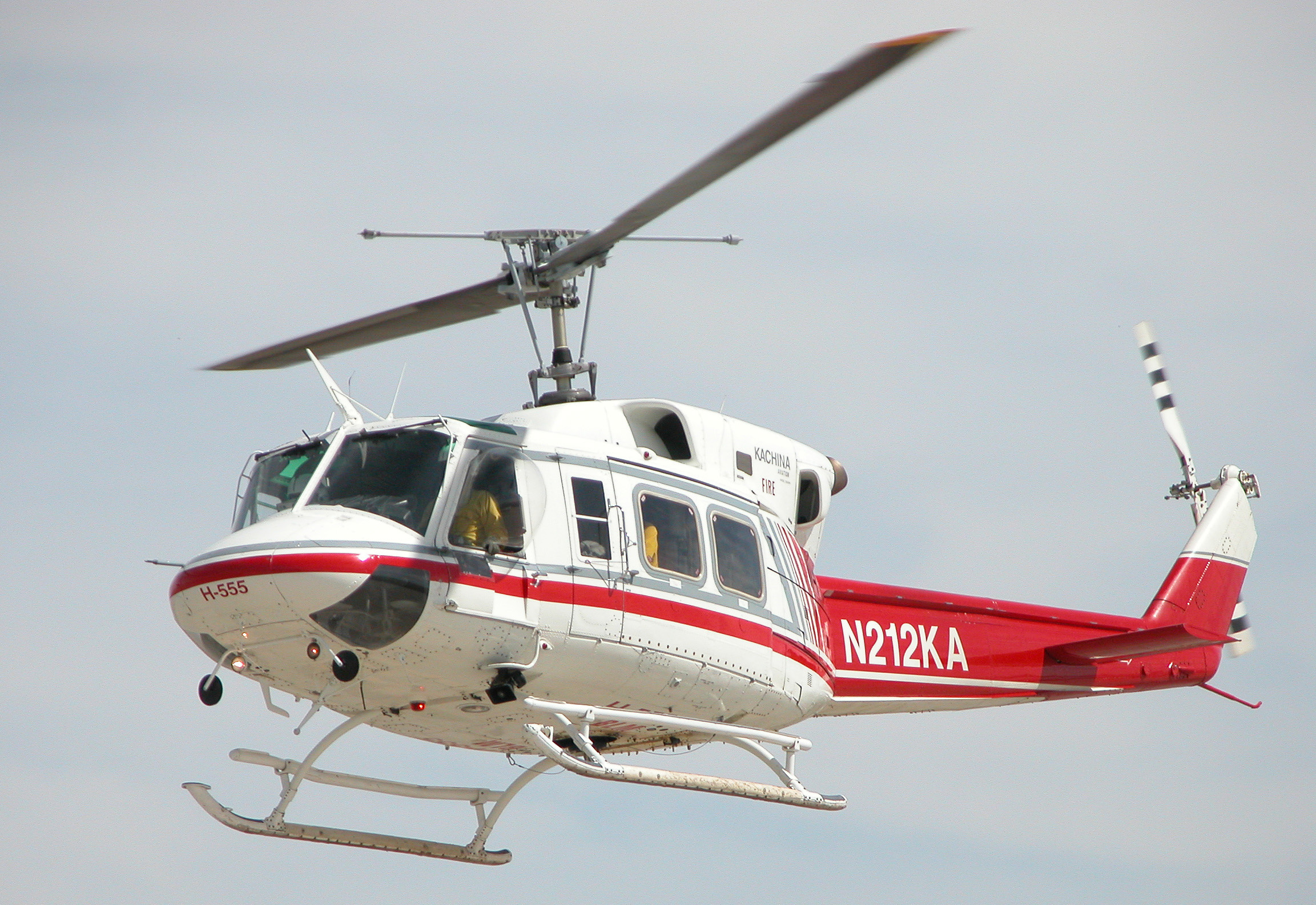
- Bell 212 operated by Kachina departs from the Mojave Spaceport

General information
- Type: Medium utility helicopter
- National origin: United States/Canada
- Manufacturer: Bell Helicopter
- Status: Production completed
- Primary user: CHC Helicopter

History
- Manufactured: 1968–1998
- Introduction date: 1968
- First flight: 1968
- Developed from: Bell 204/205
- Variant: Bell UH-1N Twin Huey
- Developed into: Bell 412

The Bell 212 (also known as the Bell Two-Twelve) is a two-blade, twin-engine, medium helicopter that first flew in 1968. Originally manufactured by Bell Helicopter in Fort Worth, Texas, United States, production was moved to Mirabel, Quebec, Canada in 1988, along with all Bell commercial helicopter production after that plant opened in 1986.

The 212 was marketed to civilian operators and has up to a 15-seat capacity, with one pilot and fourteen passengers. In cargo-carrying configuration, the 212 has an internal capacity of 220 ft^{3} (6.23 m^{3}). An external load of up to 5,000 lb (2,268 kg) can be carried.

== Development ==
Based on the stretched fuselage Bell 205, the Bell 212 was originally developed for the Canadian Forces as the CUH-1N and later redesignated as the CH-135. The Canadian Forces took delivery of 50 starting in May 1971. At the same time the United States military services ordered 294 Bell 212s under the designation UH-1N.

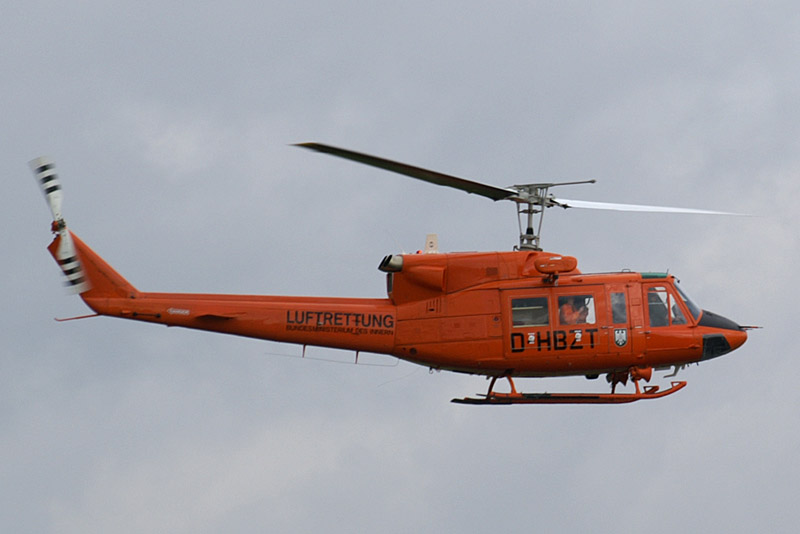
German Bell 212 used as air ambulance by the Ministry of the Interior

By 1971, the Bell 212 had been developed for commercial applications. Among the earliest uses of the type in civil aviation was by Helicopter Service AS of Norway to be used in support of offshore drilling; it proved popular across the offshore sector in particular as it had been certified for operating under marginal weather conditions. Today, the 212 can be found used in logging operations, maritime rescue and resupply in the Arctic on the Distant Early Warning Line or North Warning System.

The 212 is powered by a Pratt & Whitney Canada PT6T-3 Twin-Pac made up of two coupled PT6 power turbines driving a common gearbox. They are capable of producing up to 1,800 shp (1,342 kW). Should one power section fail the remaining section can deliver 900 shp (671 kW) for 30 minutes, or 765 shp (571 kW) continuously, enabling the 212 to maintain cruise performance at maximum weight.

Early 212s configured with an Instrument Flight Rules (IFR) package were required to have a large and very obvious fin attached to the roof of the aircraft, above and slightly behind the cockpit. This fin was initially determined necessary to alter the turning performance of the aircraft during complex instrument flight maneuvers, but is no longer required due to revised stipulations of the type certificate. Many aircraft still fly with the modification.

In 1979, with the purchase of eight by the Civil Air Authority, the 212 became the first U.S. helicopter sold in the People's Republic of China.

The ICAO designator for this aircraft as used in a flight plan is "B212". Bell developed the Model 212 further with the Bell 412; the major difference being the composite four-blade main rotor. The last Bell 212 was delivered in 1998.

== Variants ==
- Bell Model 212 - Bell Helicopters company designation for the UH-1N.
- Twin Two-Twelve - Civil utility transport version. It can carry up to 14 passengers.
- Agusta-Bell AB 212 - Civil or military utility transport version. Built under license in Italy by Agusta.
- Agusta-Bell AB.212ASW - Anti-Submarine Warfare variant of AB.212
- Bell Model 412 - Bell 212 with a four-bladed semi-rigid rotor system.
- Eagle Single - Bell 212 converted to a single-engine configuration. Produced by Eagle Copters of Calgary, Alberta, Canada, using a Lycoming T5317A, T5317B, or T5317BCV engine.

== Operators ==
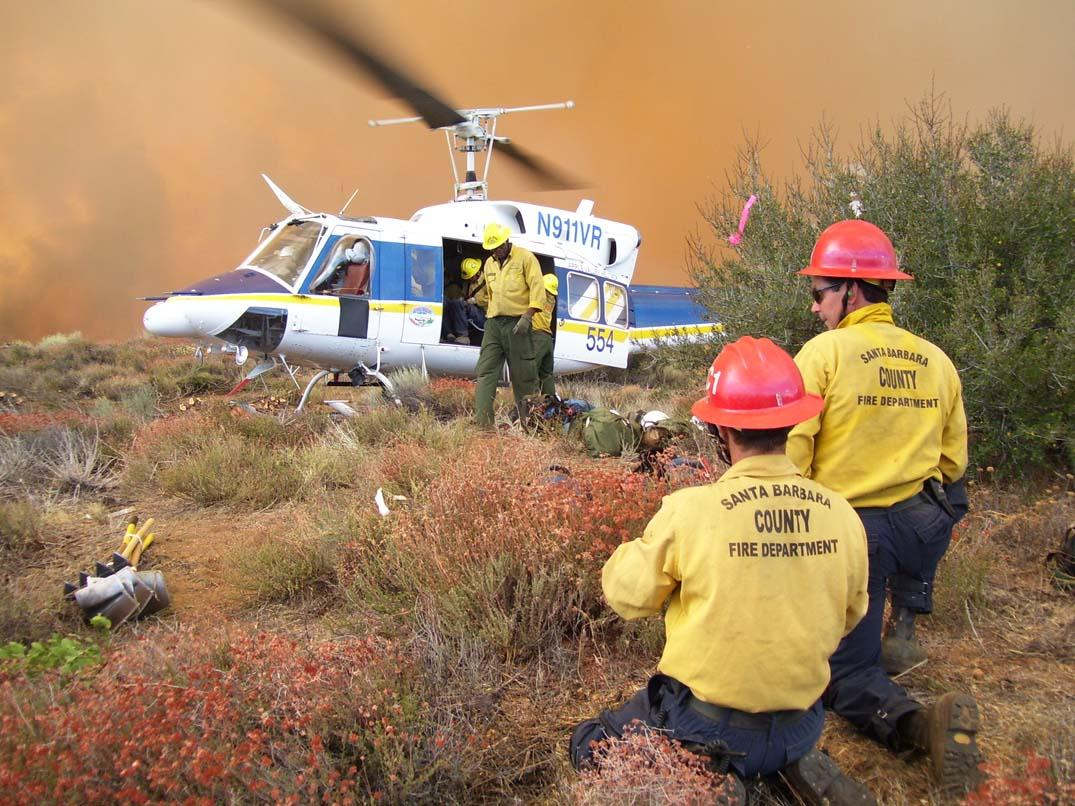
Santa Barbara County Handcrew and a Bell 212 on the Day Fire

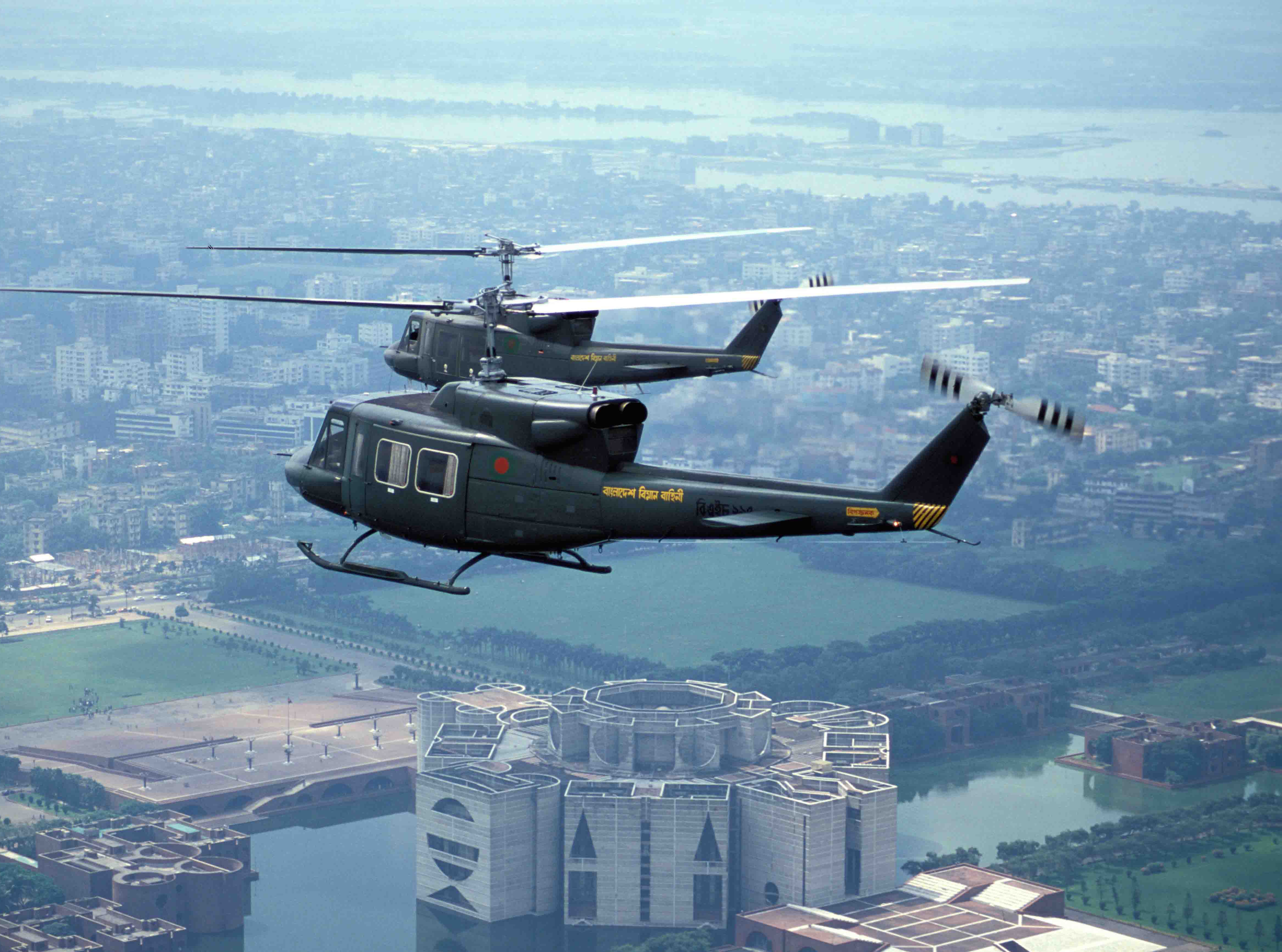
Bangladesh Air Force Bell-212s flying in formation over the National parliament of Bangladesh

=== Civil and government operators ===
The Bell 212 is used by many private and commercial operators, it is particularly popular in the oil industries and for law enforcement use.

Bosnia and Herzegovina

- State Investigation and Protection Agency

Canada

Canadian Mountain Holidays (CMH) have used 212s for 30+ years

- Canadian Coast Guard - former operator of six 212s

Croatia

- Croatian Police

Colombia

- Policía Nacional de Colombia

Greenland

- Air Greenland

Iran

- Iranian state

Japan

- Japan Coast Guard

North Macedonia

- Police of North Macedonia

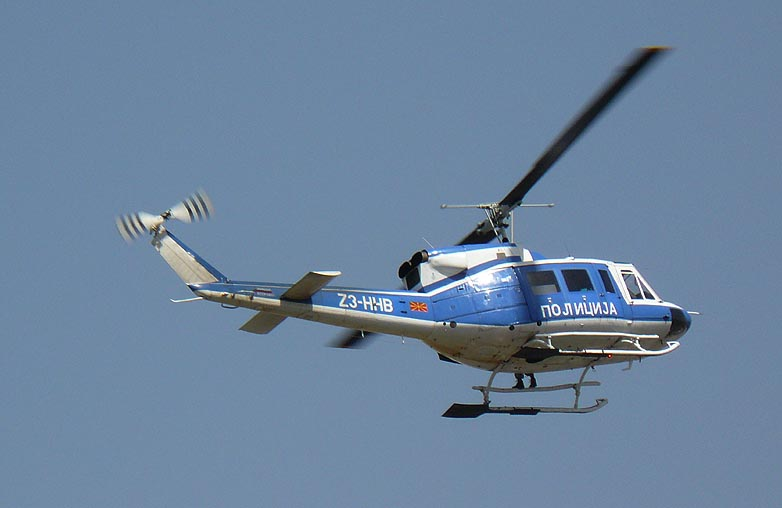
Bell 212 of the Macedonian Police (now Police of North Macedonia) flying over Skopje in 2008

Serbia

- Serbian Police

Slovenia

- Slovenian National Police since 2022 no longer uses the helicopter. They donated it to Pivka Park of Military History where it is displayed.

Thailand

- Royal Thai Police

United States

- San Bernardino County Sheriff's Department
- San Diego Fire Department

== Specifications (Bell 212) ==
Bell 212 3-view drawing

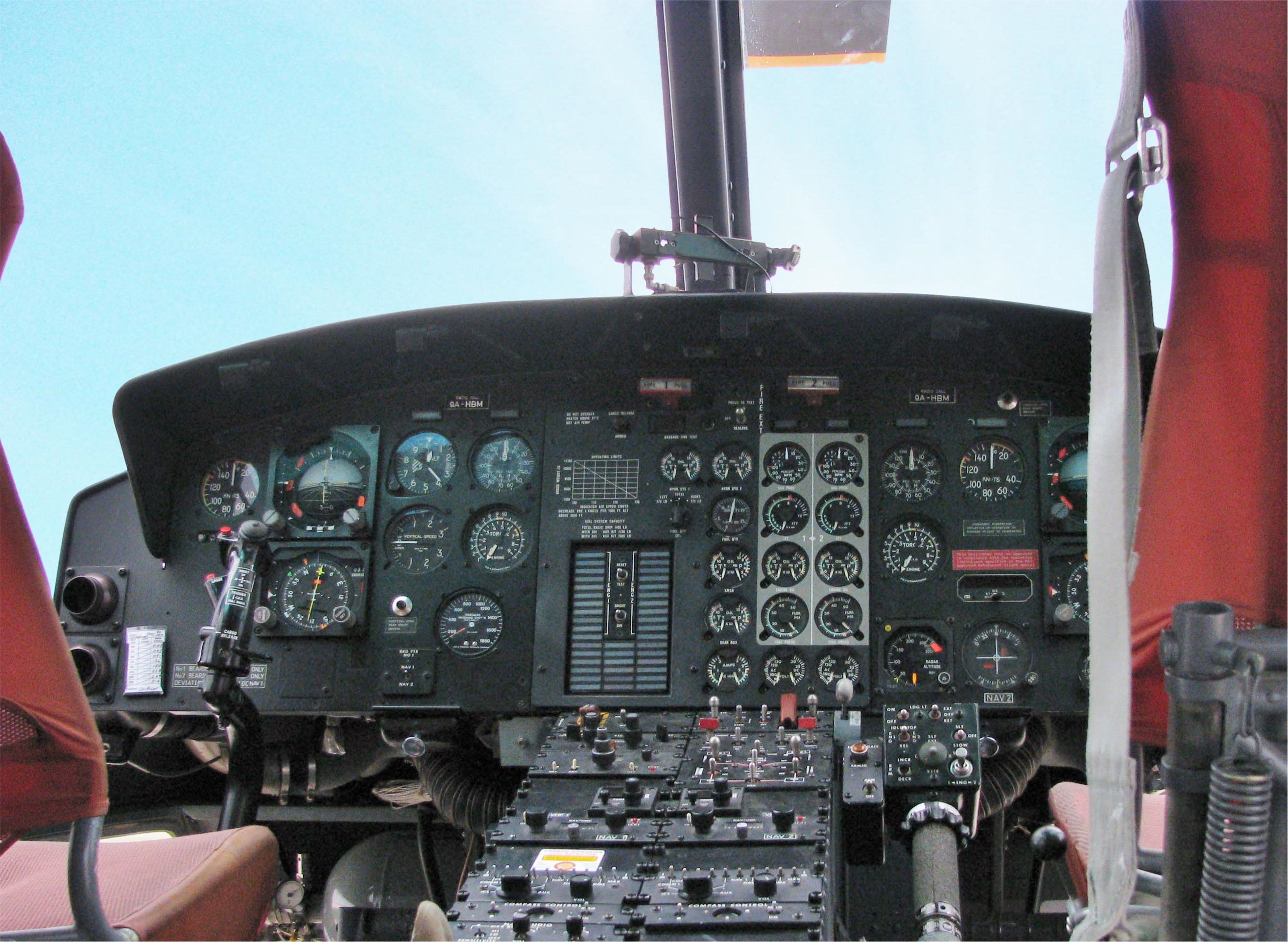
Cockpit

Data from Bell 212 Rotorcraft Flight Manual

General characteristics

- Crew: 1 (two for IFR operation)
- Capacity: 14 passengers
- Length: 57 ft 1.68 in (17.4163 m)
- Height: 12 ft 6.83 in (3.8311 m)
- Empty weight: 6,529 lb (2,962 kg)
- Max takeoff weight: 11,200 lb (5,080 kg)
- Powerplant: 1 × Pratt & Whitney Canada PT6T-3 or -3B coupled turboshaft engine, 1,800 shp (1,300 kW) (TwinPac)
- Main rotor diameter: 48 ft 0 in (14.63 m)
- Main rotor area: 1,809.5 sq ft (168.11 m^{2})
- Blade Section: root: NACA 0010.8; tip: NACA 0005.4 mod

Performance

- Cruise speed: 100 kn (120 mph, 190 km/h)
- Never exceed speed: 120 kn (140 mph, 220 km/h)
- Range: 237 nmi (273 mi, 439 km)
- Service ceiling: 17,400 ft (5,300 m)
- Rate of climb: 1,745 ft/min (8.86 m/s)
- Disk loading: 6.19 lb/sq ft (30.2 kg/m^{2})

== Notable incidents ==
- 1982 Bristow Helicopters Bell 212 crash: On 14 September 1982, a medical evacuation helicopter flight operated by Bristow Helicopters crashed during the early hours of the morning in driving rain and poor visibility over the North Sea. All six crew members on board died when their aircraft plunged into the sea near the Murchison platform while trying to locate the Baffin Seal seismic survey vessel.
- 2012 Rampayoh helicopter crash: On 20 July 2012, a Bell 212 helicopter of the Royal Brunei Air Force (RBAirF) crashed in the region of Kuala Belait, at Ulu Rampayoh in Mukim Labi. Twelve of the fourteen people on board were killed. The two survivors were in serious condition but recovered.
- 2024 Varzaqan helicopter crash: On 19 May 2024, a Bell 212 helicopter operated by the Islamic Republic of Iran Air Force carrying Iranian President Ebrahim Raisi, Foreign Minister Hossein Amir-Abdollahian, Governor of East Azerbaijan Malek Rahmati, and the Supreme Leader's representative in East Azerbaijan Mohammad Ali Ale-Hashem crashed near the Iranian city of Varzaqan, East Azerbaijan, killing all 8 people on board.
- A Sri Lanka Air Force (SLAF) Bell 212 helicopter crashed into the Maduru Oya reservoir on May 9, 2025, resulting in the deaths of six military personnel(four army personnel and two air force personnel) The incident occurred during a demonstration for a Special Forces passing-out parade.
- A Sri Lanka Air Force (SLAF) Bell 212 helicopter crash-landed in the Gin Oya river near Lunuwila/Wennappuwa on 11/30/2025, during disaster relief operations, resulting in the death of the pilot. The pilot, Wing Commander Nirmal Siyambalapitiya, was posthumously promoted to the rank of Group Captain and has been hailed as a hero for his actions.

== See also ==
Related development

- Bell 204/205
- Bell 412
- Bell CH-146 Griffon
- Bell UH-1 Iroquois
- Bell UH-1N Twin Huey
- Bell UH-1Y Venom

Related lists

- List of aircraft of the AOC
- List of civil aircraft
