= 1982 Bristow Helicopters Bell 212 crash =

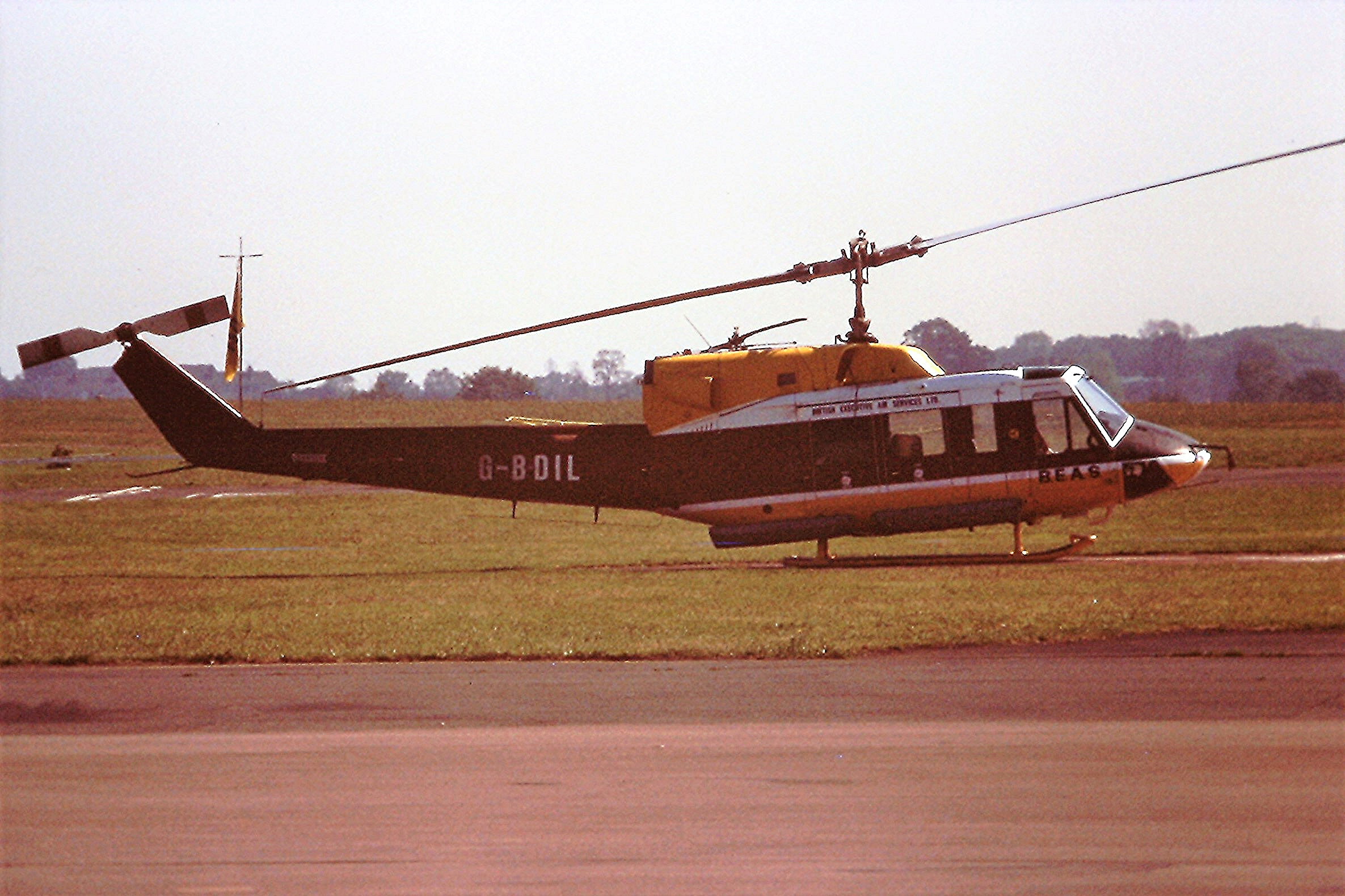
- G-BDIL, the aircraft involved in the accident

Accident
- Date: 14 September 1982
- Summary: Crashed into sea; cause undetermined
- Site: North Sea; 61°35′58″N 1°58′51″E

Aircraft
- Aircraft type: Bell 212
- Registration: G-BDIL
- Flight origin: Treasure Finder flotel platform
- Destination: Baffin Seal seismic survey vessel
- Occupants: 6
- Crew: 6
- Fatalities: 6
- Survivors: 0

On 14 September 1982 a medical evacuation helicopter flight operated by Bristow Helicopters crashed during the early hours of the morning in driving rain and poor visibility over the North Sea. All six crew members on board died when their aircraft plunged into the sea near the Murchison platform (Note: This production platform was decommissioned and removed by 29 June 2017) while trying to locate the Baffin Seal seismic survey vessel.

The Accidents Investigation Branch of the United Kingdom issued the final report on the cause of the crash on 22 June 1984. It concluded that there was insufficient evidence to determine a conclusive cause of the accident, although adverse weather, total darkness, and a difficult mission profile were all major factors.

== Accident details ==
=== Background ===
The large petroleum reserves under the North Sea have been exploited since 1965. The Treasure Finder semi-submersible accommodation platform supported a number of offshore oil rigs and normally carried a group of four Bell 212 support helicopters for inter-rig transfers of passengers and freight and medical evacuation. Treasure Finder also contained hospital facilities servicing the Brent oilfield. On 14 September 1982, a crewman on the Baffin Seal seismic survey vessel suffered an injury, and the captain sent a request for medical assistance to the Treasure Finder. The Baffin Seal's helicopter deck was obstructed, so the rescue helicopter would not be able to land on the vessel but instead would have to winch the casualty aboard. To accomplish this, the helicopter took off with a full crew of pilot, co-pilot, winch operator, winchman, doctor and medic.

=== Flight summary ===
The Bell 212 lifted off at 2.25 am (all times are UTC) on a course to the Baffin Seal's reported location with a plan to lower the two medical personnel onto the ship and, if necessary, winch them back onboard with the injured crewman. At 2.31 am the co-pilot told approach control that they were unable to establish marine VHF communication with the vessel, and asked for navigational assistance from the Murchison platform. Witnesses on the platform and its stand-by vessel later saw the helicopter pass by in a northeasterly direction in driving rain and poor visibility. At 2.36 am approach control informed the helicopter that the survey vessel had a searchlight and could turn it on and point it vertically to assist in location and the co-pilot replied a minute later that they could see the Baffin Seal and were in radio communication. At 2.41 am approach control attempted to call the helicopter but received no reply. The last transmission from the aircraft was on marine radio at 2.42 am: "Five miles north of the Murchison platform letting down to surface contact."

After repeated attempts to contact the helicopter were unsuccessful, approach control declared an alert at 2.50 am. Four helicopters, a Royal Air Force Nimrod, a United States (Note: Although the UPI twice identifies this as a "United States Air Force" aircraft, United States governmental operators of the Lockheed P-3 Orion have only been the United States Navy, National Oceanic and Atmospheric Administration, and Customs and Border Protection making it probable this was a Navy aircraft.) Orion and several support vessels in the area searched for the missing aircraft. At 10.23 am two inflated life rafts were spotted floating upside-down 16 miles (26 km) northeast of the Murchison platform. Other pieces of helicopter debris and three bodies were found and recovered 17 to 22 miles (27 to 35 km) northeast of this platform during the day. On 17 September an underwater locator beacon led searchers to the bulk of the wreckage and two more bodies, 14 miles (23 km) from the platform at 1,120 ft (340 m) below water.

=== Company operations ===
At the time of the accident, Bristow Helicopters was the largest private operator of helicopters in the United Kingdom, with a fleet of 70 aircraft. Bristow was responsible for providing four search-and-rescue helicopters based on the Treasure Finder with pilots and crew. Normally, fourteen pilots were on the rig and a similar number ashore, of which four were qualified for nighttime search-and-rescues. The pilot of the accident aircraft, who was also the Chief Pilot for the Brent Field, was one of only two such qualified pilots available that night; the other night-qualified pilot had flown extensively earlier that day.

The accident was one of a series suffered by Bristow helicopters in the North Sea in just over a year. These included the 12 August 1981 loss of another Bell 212 and the 13 August 1981 loss of a Westland Wessex. Soon after the crash, former Labour Secretary of State for Social Services David Ennals called for a Trade Department inquiry into the safety of helicopter operations in the North Sea oil industry. The accident brought the total number of dead from North Sea helicopter accidents by all UK operators to 40.

=== Accident aircraft ===
The Bell 212 registered as G-BDIL was a twin-engine two-bladed medium helicopter manufactured on 18 July 1975. For the flight the rear bench seats were removed to allow fitting a rescue winch, leaving only two rear seats available and the remaining two cabin crew using safety harnesses. The aircraft had a Certificate of Airworthiness that was valid until 30 January 1983 and a Certificate of Maintenance that was valid until 27 October 1982 or 7,567.5 airframe hours. The airframe had a total of 7,532.25 hours at the time of the accident. The gross weight of the aircraft and the estimated center of gravity were both within authorized limits. The aircraft had two liferafts installed and all six personnel were wearing immersion survival suits and life vests with personal locator beacons. The aircraft was also equipped with a SARBE beacon and an underwater locator beacon, both activated by immersion in salt water. Available navigation equipment installed included a Decca Navigator System, VOR, and ADF receivers. During the flight, the co-pilot had asked for the non-directional beacon on the Murchison platform to be turned on to assist in finding the Baffin Seal but the beacon remained off until after the accident because the platform's radio operator was fixing an equipment issue.

== Investigation ==
Two oilfield diving support vessels were placed at the service of investigators on the day of the accident, the Kommandor Michael and the British Voyager, equipped with sonar, underwater video equipment, lifting gear, and an underwater location beacon receiver. Kommandor Michael was also equipped with two remote-control unmanned submersibles while British Voyager carried two manned submersibles. After locating the wreckage on the sea floor on 17 September at 61°35′58″N 1°58′51″E in about 1,100 feet (340 m) of water, one of British Voyager's submersibles performed a video survey and located the bodies of two of the missing aircrew. Due to the water depth, the impact damage to the airframe, and a prolonged period of dangerous weather, it was not until 10 October that the semi-submersible lifting vessel Uncle John was able to retrieve the wreckage for analysis.

The damage to the airframe showed that it had sustained a severe impact to the front right quarter, consistent with a high-speed impact with the ocean surface while nose-down, banked to the right, with both the main and tail rotors spinning. Investigators did not document any pre-impact damage to the helicopter, its engines, transmission, rotors, avionics, or other systems nor were there any documented physiological impairments to the aircrew. Evidence recovered from the navigational systems and the position of and damage to the wreckage indicated the helicopter lost altitude during a turn to the right while flying at a low altitude searching for the Baffin Seal.

The investigation was unable to determine a specific cause of the accident. The flight took place in darkness and weather conditions of high wind and rain soon after the aircrew had been awakened, and at a very low altitude while attempting to locate a difficult target—in such conditions there was a low margin for safety and any loss of altitude would have been fatal.

== See also ==
- List of accidents and incidents involving helicopters
- 1981 Bristow Helicopters Westland Wessex crash
