= 2012 Rampayoh helicopter crash =

Helicopter accident in Brunei

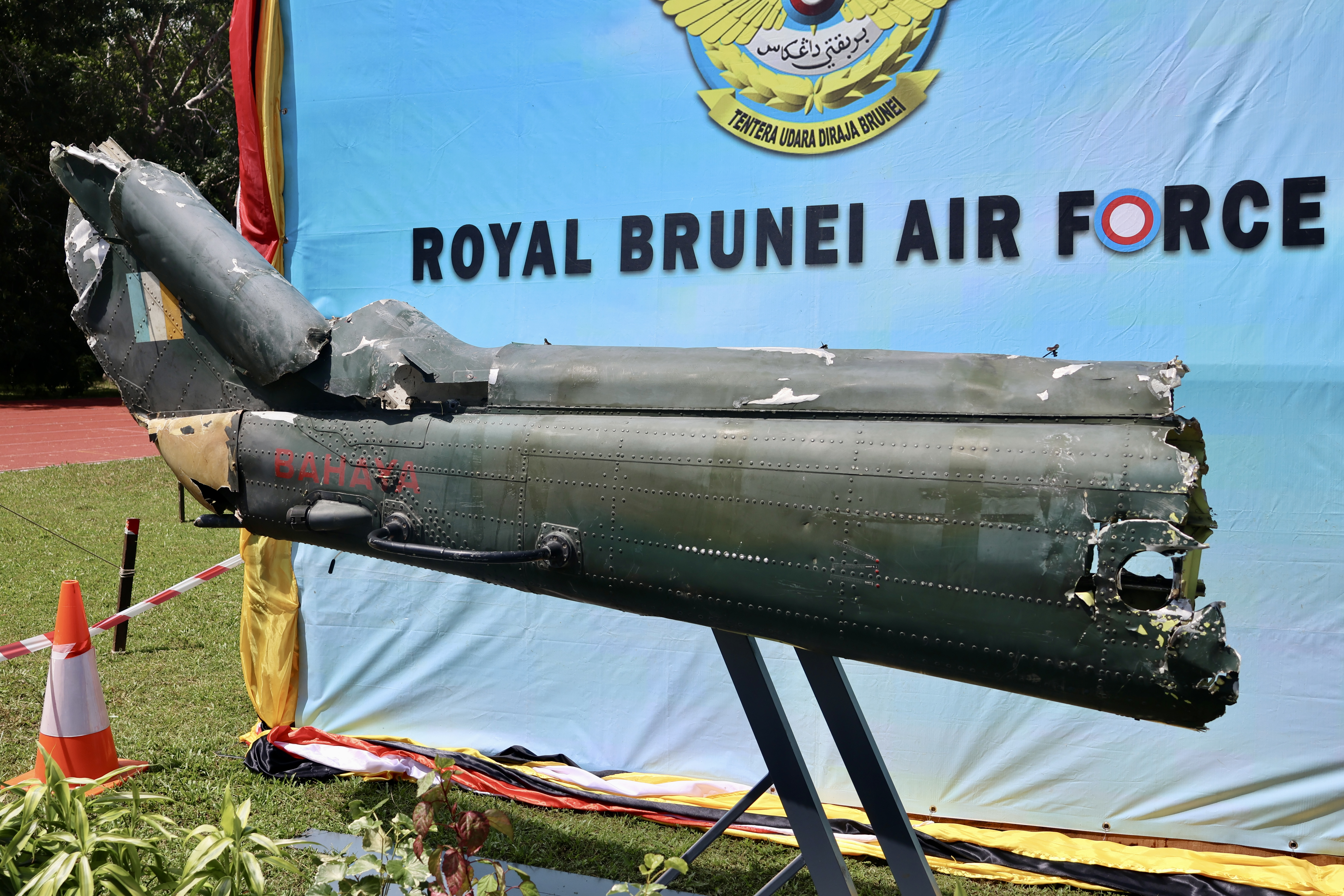
- The tail of the aircraft involved on display at Penanjong Camp in 2024

Accident
- Date: 20 July 2012
- Summary: Controlled flight into terrain due to pilot error
- Site: Rampayoh, Belait, Brunei

Aircraft
- Aircraft type: Bell 212
- Operator: Royal Brunei Air Force
- Call sign: TY
- Registration: TUDB-133
- Flight origin: KB 404
- Destination: KB 199
- Occupants: 14
- Passengers: 11
- Crew: 3
- Fatalities: 12
- Injuries: 2
- Survivors: 2

On 20 July 2012, a Bell 212 helicopter of the Royal Brunei Air Force (RBAirF) crashed in the region of Kuala Belait, at Ulu Rampayoh in Mukim Labi. Twelve of the fourteen people on board were killed. The two survivors were in serious condition but recovered. The Ministry of Defence (MinDef) of the country revealed on the following day, what is thought to be the biggest aviation accident in the country's history. (Note: The crash was also deemed the "worst tragedy in the history of Brunei's defence," according to the Borneo Bulletin.) In order to stop such mishaps from happening again, the board of inquiry suggested that the air force enhance safety, protocols, and training after the incident.

The Royal Brunei Armed Forces (RBAF) and the MinDef formed the Supreme Board of Inquiry (BOI) on 25 July 2012, with the goals of looking into the Bell 212 helicopter crash, suggesting ways to avoid such events in the future, and strengthening safety procedures. After 40 years of service, the Bell 212 fleet was officially retired on 1 August 2014, and replaced with Sikorsky S-70i helicopters.

== Accident ==
On 20 July 2012, a RBAriF Bell 212 helicopter was on its way back to Bandar Seri Begawan, the capital, following the passengers' completion of training in jungle warfare. At 10:15 a.m., in a location known as Ulu Rampayoh, the helicopter carrying fourteen military men went down. Eleven military servicemen and three crew members were on board, however it was not immediately known who they were. The incident happened one day before the observation of the first day of Ramadan on Saturday.

The following service members were on board the aircraft:

- 765 Lieutenant (U) Pengiran Haji Arif Iskandar bin Pengiran Haji Shahbuddin
- 770 Captain Md Ismael bin Dato Setia Haji Samid
- 810 Lieutenant Md Khairol Mahdi bin Haji Sahri
- 13203 Staff Sergeant (U) Haji Mohd Amin bin Mahmud
- 17808 Corporal Mohd Mahdinie bin Nuruddin
- 18223 Lance Corporal (U) Khairuddin bin Haji Abbas
- 19967 Officer Cadet Mohd Khairul Anuar bin Haji Tahir (aged 24)
- 19969 Officer Cadet Mohd Fadhullah Harun bin Hj Asmat
- 19970 Officer Cadet Mohd Azhar bin Sulong (aged 24)
- 19988 Officer Cadet (U) Nurul Azizi bin Shahri (aged 23)
- 21700 Officer Cadet Dayangku Nurazimah binti Pengiran Hassanan
- 21703 Officer Cadet Farhana binti Jaidin (aged 22)
- 21707 Officer Cadet Siti Nabeelah binti Haji Naidi (aged 25)
- Officer Cadet Mohd Zaim bin Haji Mohd Norzairi

== Response and aftermath ==
At around 1.53 pm of the same day, the RBAirF declared the aircraft missing, and only then did search and rescue (SAR) activities begin. According to the report, at around 3:55 p.m., the wrecked remnants of the airplane were discovered in Wasai Wang Tebadak. The RBAirF carried on its SAR mission for the missing accident victims until the noon of 21 July 2012. By midday on the same day, it was announced that every individual involved in the collision had been identified, resulting in a total of 12 dead and 2 survivors.

After being transported to the Raja Isteri Pengiran Anak Saleha Hospital (RIPAS Hospital), the two survivors (Note: The two survivors are Mohd Zaim bin Haji Mohd Norzairi and Mohd Fadhullah Harun bin Hj Asmat.) were reported to be in a stable state. One of the two cadets who survived the incident inquired, "How is my squad?" while suffering severe injuries, according to the report. According to the report, one cadet was receiving treatment for a broken arm and a sprained leg, while the other had surgery but was recovering well. Pehin Dato Adanan Yusof, the Minister of Health, ensured that the survivors received the finest care available for their wounds.

Sultan Hassanal Bolkiah gave permission to visit the air force base and see the casualties who had been flown back from the scene. Second Lieutenant Prince Abdul Mateen was also present. After then, the Sultan gave his permission to visit the hospital and see how the victims who were receiving care were doing. His Majesty gave permission for the victims' relatives to be met when they were in the RIPAS Hospital and the air force base. In addition to offering his condolences to the victims' families, the Sultan also wished for the victims' blessings and presence among the religious. The two survivors were interviewed by Crown Prince Al-Muhtadee Billah during his morning visit to RIPAS Hospital on 28 July.

All of the dead have been taken to the surau of Bolkiah Garrison since the night of the crash and the next morning so that they will be buried under the supervision of RBAF Religious Department staff. Officers and staff from the MinDef and the RBAF, together with family members and relatives, attended the prayer service for the victims. A religious ceremony of reading the Yassin (Ya-Sin) and Tahlil was held simultaneously this morning at two separate surau, Bolkiah Garrison for female personnel and Berakas Garrison for male personnel, with the aim of deepening the sympathy of the MinDef and RBAF for the families of the victims.

== Aircraft ==
The Bell 212, call sign TY, msn 31230, was the aircraft involved in the crash. The aircraft had many changes to its registration, including AMDB-133, ABDB-133, ATUDB-133, and TUDB-133.

The aircraft's primary function was to provide aerial medical care to Brunei's remote districts. Furthermore, it has the ability to do many tasks, particularly relevant to operations in Brunei's limited jungle and open terrain. The Bell 212 also handles suppressing weapon delivery, logistical distribution by abseil or jungle line replenishment, and SAR missions. Additionally, it uses fast-roping for offensive troops and multi-rope rappelling to transport soldiers within limited spaces. Over the course of its existence, it has undergone a number of improvements, with the most recent being in the late 1990s, allowed the Bell 212 fleet to conduct operations at night by employing night vision goggles (NVG).

== Investigation ==
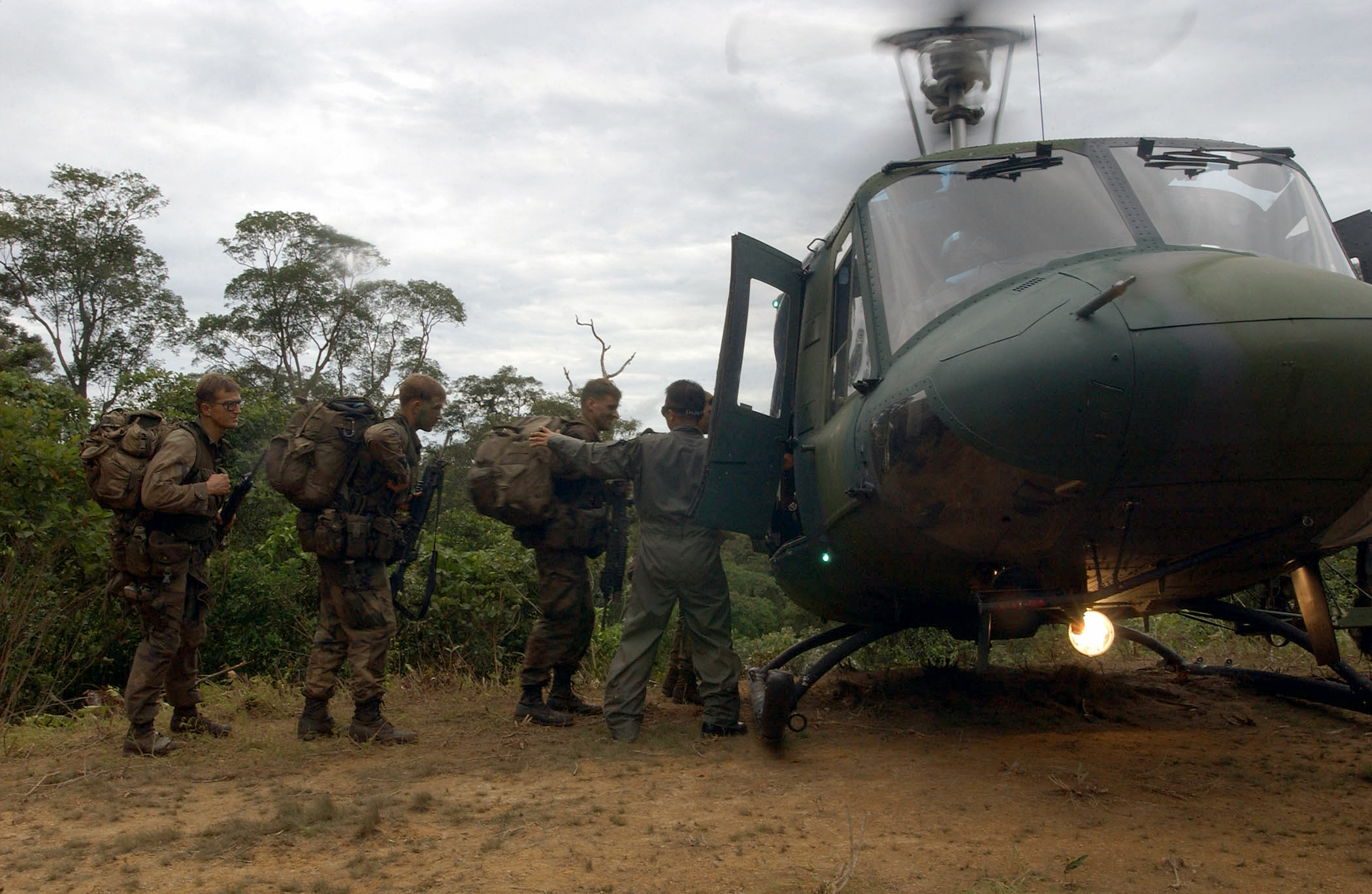
A Bell 212, similar to the aircraft involved

The accident was determined to be primarily the result of "human error," according to the Supreme BOI report written by the RBAF with assistance from foreign experts, as reported by Borneo Bulletin. According to investigations, the helicopter's pilot violated flight regulations by engaging in "unauthorised low-level flying," which resulted in a "Controlled Flight into Terrain (CFIT)" mishap.

According to the study, when the Bell 212's radio transmission dropped off the "Brunei Radar," the Department of Civil Aviation's (DCA) Air Traffic Control Unit failed to notify the appropriate parties in accordance with aviation control protocols. On 1 September 2012, during a news conference held at the MinDef at Bolkiah Garrison, the Supreme BOI announced the results of its five-week inquiry. The Commander of the RBAF, Major General Aminuddin Ihsan and the Deputy Minister of Defence, Mustappa Sirat, convened the news conference.

First Admiral Abdul Halim, Commander of the Royal Brunei Navy, who was in charge of the BOI, presented a detailed report in which he stated that, according to illustrations taken from the report of its findings, the helicopter's pilot had engaged in "unauthorised low-level flying" around the Wasai Wang Tebadak area (LP KB 195A) at a speed of about 60–80 knots (110–150 km/h; 69–92 mph) before the crash. He then made a 45-degree "banking" to follow the river's path. He stated:

The aircraft strayed and was reduced from its original altitude due to a G-force factor... At the very last minute, the aircraft attempted to raise its altitude but (it) was in vain and it subsequently crashed into two large trees.

— First Admiral Dato Seri Pahlawan Haji Abdul Halim bin Haji Mohd Hanifah

The investigation also said that on 20 July 2012, the day of the event, at around 8.55 a.m., the Royal Brunei Air Force Base in Kampong Rimba was the departure point for the RBAF's Bell 212 helicopter. The crash happened about 09:17 a.m., after taking off and losing contact with the "Brunei Radar." in the morning in clear weather. After a training exercise was over, the aircraft was moving troops between landing zones from KB 404 to KB 199. Of the 14 military people transported on the mission, three were aircraft crew, two were trainers, one was staff, and eight were officer cadets. According to the report, the aircraft was thought to have crashed at approximately 10.15 a.m.

All aircraft flying in the nation's airspace are required to make bps regular call communication every 30 minutes, under the aviation control protocol of the Air Traffic Control Unit of the DCA. However, there was no further contact, and the DCA Air Traffic Control Unit neglected to notify the RBAF to initiate a "distress procedure" and to issue an INCERFA (uncertainty phase) warning. This continued for several hours, leading to a "alerting service" that was not carried out in accordance with protocol, the report continued.

According to Dato Halim, the BOI evaluated environmental and material considerations, verifying that the aircraft was airworthy and the weather was favourable at the time of the event. According to the verification of three foreign inquiry specialists, there were no technical issues discovered before the disaster. Expert teams from Bell Textron, Pratt & Whitney, and the United States Army Combat Readiness Center's Air Accident Investigation Team provided support to the BOI. The results of the investigation were communicated to the accident victims' relatives before the press presentation, and the full BOI report—which includes further recommendations—will be made public on 16 September 2012.

== Reactions and later developments ==
Following the crash, Sultan Hassanal Bolkiah received sympathy letters from President Tony Tan Keng Yam, Prime Minister Lee Hsien Loong, and Minister for Defence Ng Eng Hen.

The Supreme BOI was founded on 25 July 2012, by MinDef and RBAF. The board was entrusted with investigating the helicopter accident, gathering information about its causes and circumstances, and recommending actions that should be taken to ensure that a similar catastrophe never occurs. The original assessment, dated 6 August 2012, made several strong suggestions, some of which have been implemented, particularly with regard to safety and process reinforcement by the RBAF.

The Bell 212 helicopters were scheduled for replacement shortly after the crash as formal deal was inked earlier on 2 December 2011 by Sikorsky Aircraft and the Brunei MinDef to provide 12 Sikorsky S-70i helicopters to the nation. The fleet of Bell 212 and Bo105 aircraft was getting close to the end of its useful life when fresh orders were being placed for Sikorsky. The 4th Brunei Darussalam International Defence Exhibition in 2013 saw the unveiling of the first two Sikorsky S-70i helicopters. On 1 August 2014, the Bell212 helicopters performed their final flypast, signifying the aircraft's formal decommissioning after 40 years of service.

== See also ==
- List of accidents and incidents involving helicopters
- List of accidents and incidents involving military aircraft (2010–2019)
