= Teraja Waterfall =

Waterfall in Brunei

- Wasai Teraja
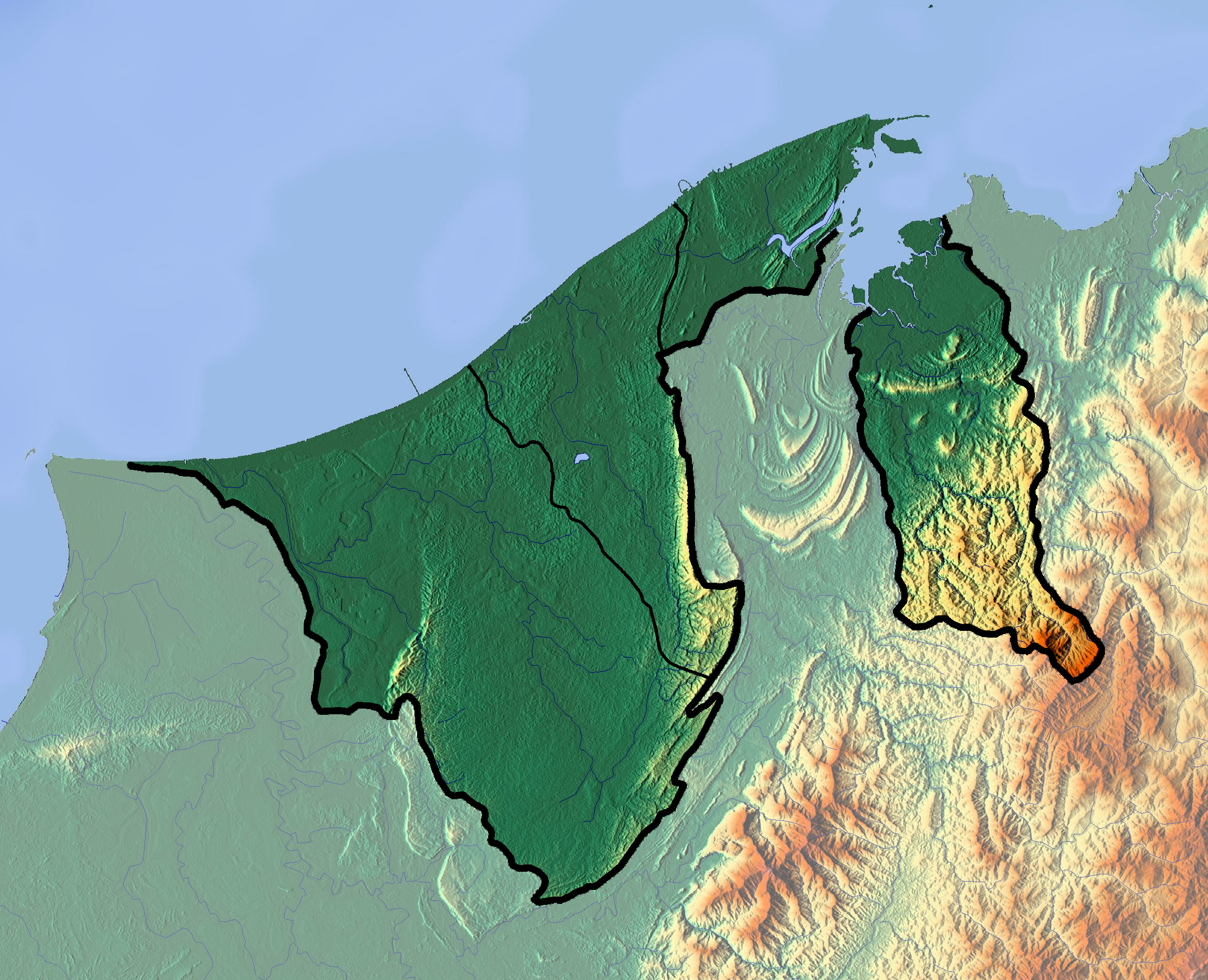
- Location within Brunei
- Location: Teraja, Belait, Brunei
- Coordinates: 4.2880462°N 114.4309903°E
- Type: Block
- Watercourse: Teraja River

Teraja Waterfall (Malay: Wasai Teraja) is a waterfall in Mukim Labi, Belait District, Brunei, on the upper reaches of the Teraja River. Out of 40 waterfalls in area of Labi, it is one of the two waterfalls open to public.

== Geography ==
The area of Mukim Labi, especially Kampong Teraja, has flora and fauna as well as protected forest areas and has now been recognized as the Heart of Borneo area. It is the aspiration of the government that wants the forest area not to be explored or developed by any party but to continue to receive holistic recommendations for protection towards the conservation of the biological diversity of the tropical forest as a national tourist destination that holds a lot of the flora and fauna, especially the wasai found in the village area. Although the area in the waterfall is not very big, rapid waterfall, cold water and decorated with various types of forest orchids that grow in the surrounding area.

== Development ==
The Youth and Sports Department (JBS) District Branch through the Youth Development Unit has organized a 'Weekend Activity' (Wasai Trail) project by exploring two areas of the waterfall (wasai) in Kampong Teraja namely Wasai Teraja and Wasai Beluluk for filling the free time of the youth with filling programs aimed at active human development. The project organized by JBS first explored Teraja Waterfall. Before the activity started, the participants first listened to a briefing and explanation about their personal safety and then they were divided into five groups to start walking towards Teraja Waterfall to clean the waterfall area in that place as their community service.

== Activities ==
A trail which led eastwards of the river, to the waterfall and the highest point in the general vicinity Teraja Hill was made. Activities such as group trekking are carried out regularly with safety precautions due to the waterfall's remoteness.

== Transportation ==
It is within 40 minute walking distance from a nearby longhouse in Kampong Teraja. It can be accessed by driving until the very end of the Labi Road. Many challenges had to be faced such as crossing several creeks.
