= 1981 Bristow Helicopters Westland Wessex crash =

1981 helicopter accident

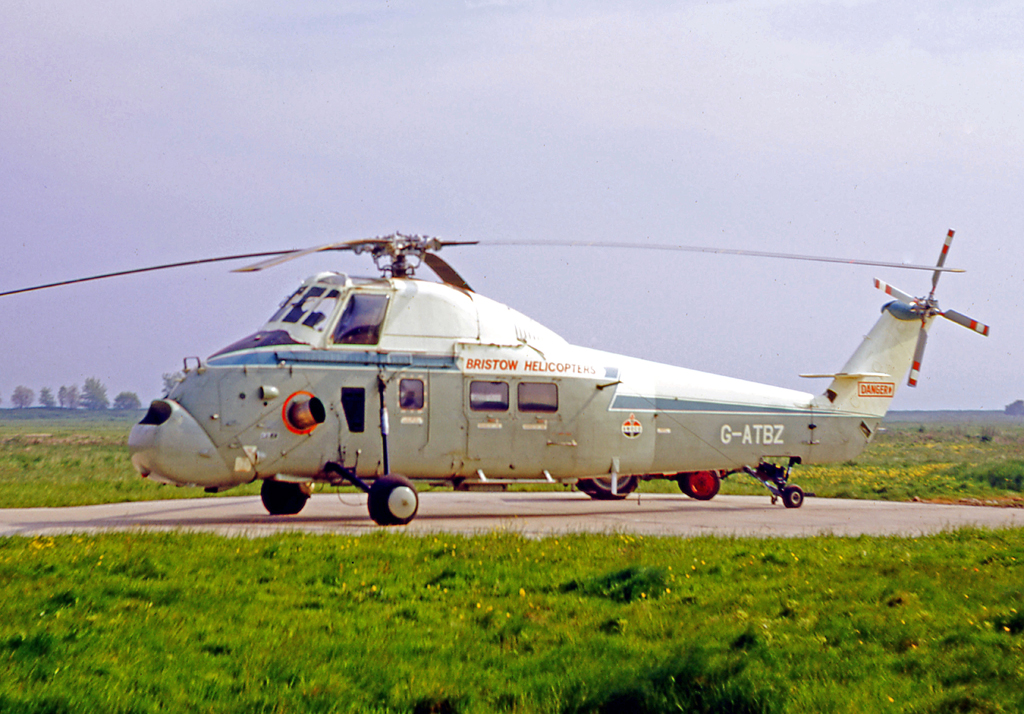
- A Bristow Westland Wessex 60 of the same type as G-ASWI

Accident
- Date: 13 August 1981
- Summary: Loss of power
- Site: Near 12 miles ENE of Bacton, Norfolk in the North Sea; 52°56′N 1°46′E

Aircraft
- Aircraft type: Westland Wessex
- Operator: Bristow Helicopters
- Registration: G-ASWI
- Occupants: 13
- Passengers: 11
- Crew: 2
- Fatalities: 13
- Survivors: 0

On 13 August 1981, a Westland Wessex 60 was operated by Bristow Helicopters between the Bacton Gas Terminal in Norfolk and Amoco gas platforms in the North Sea. During the flight, the helicopter lost power to the main rotor gearbox, going out of control during the ensuing autorotation and crashing into the North Sea. The flight was carrying 11 gas workers from the Leman gas field to Bacton. All 13 people on board died.

== Aircraft ==
G-ASWI had previously been the Westland Helicopters Company demonstrator before being purchased by Bristow Helicopters Ltd. in April 1970.

== Accident and outcomes ==
G-ASWI left the North Denes airfield at 13:47 on Thursday 13 August 1981 on a routine passenger and freight flight between rigs on the Leman and Indefatigable gas fields. The crew consisted of a pilot and a cabin attendant.

At 15:41, returning from the Leman field to the landing site at Bacton, the commander, Ben Breach, sent a distress message reporting that he was ditching due to engine failure. Radar lost the aircraft three seconds later. A Royal Air Force Search and Rescue Westland Sea King left RAF Coltishall at 15:47, sighting floating wreckage from G-ASWI at 15:57. There were no survivors.

Efforts to recover the wreck were delayed, meaning that the wreck was beyond recovery by the time salvage operations started. There was insufficient evidence to explain either the loss of power or loss of control that caused the aircraft to crash. The inquest into the deaths of those on board recorded an open verdict.

== Memorial ==
On 13 August 2014, a memorial to those killed in the crash was unveiled at Great Yarmouth Minster. A major article on the ongoing effects of the crash was published in the Eastern Daily Press in September 2014.

== See also ==
- 1982 Bristow Helicopters Bell 212 crash
