= Mukim Labi =

Mukim of Brunei

- Mukim
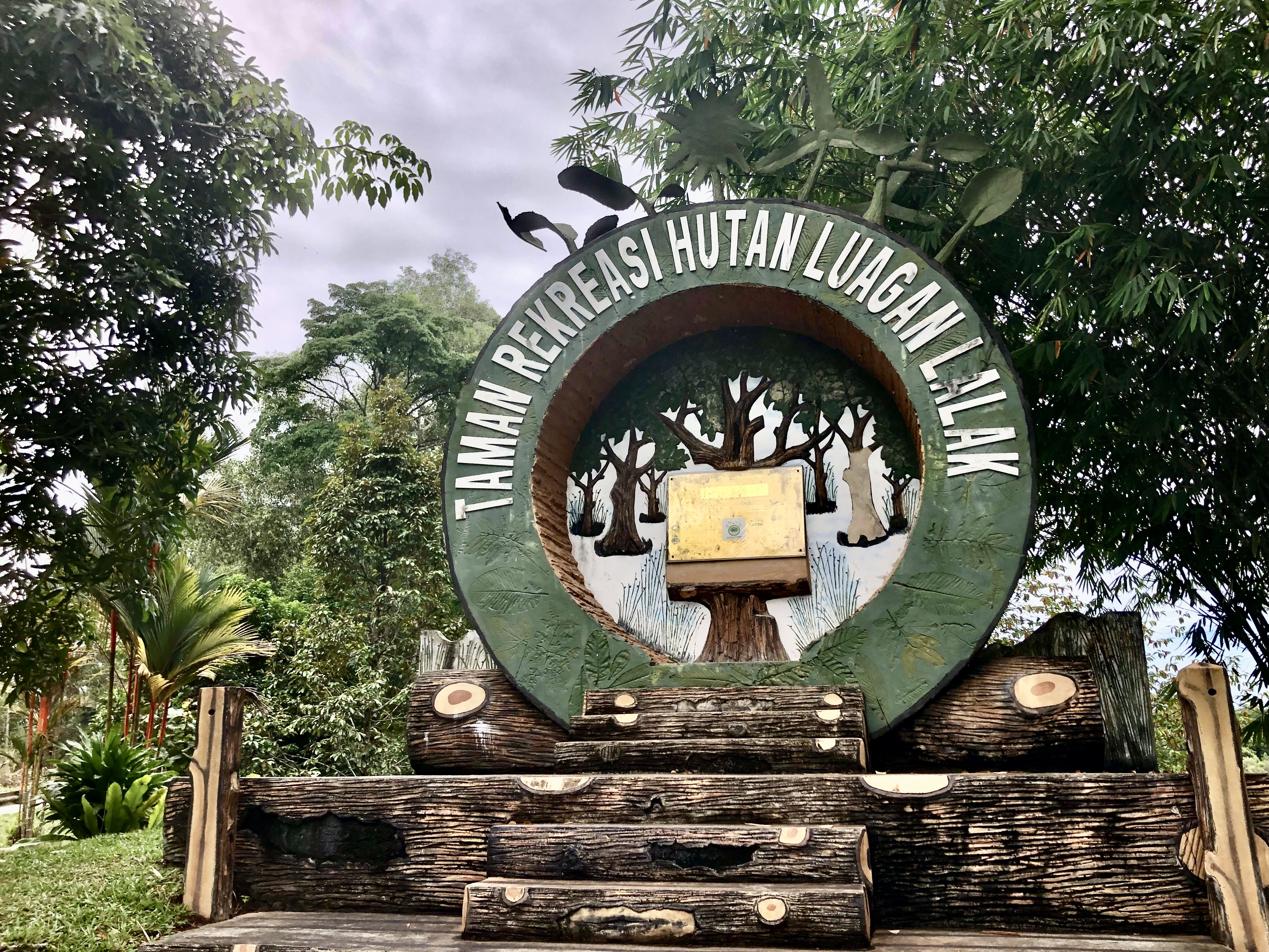
- Luagan Lalak Forest Recreation Park

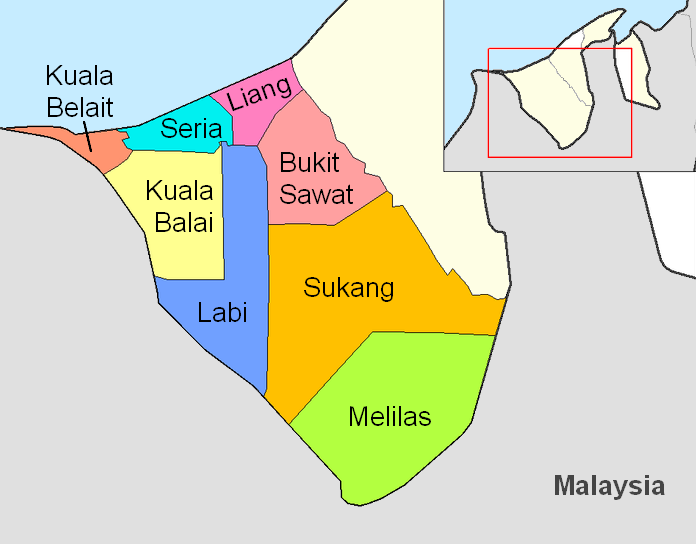
- Labi is in blue.
- Coordinates: 4°25′18″N 114°27′48″E
- Country: Brunei
- District: Belait

Government
  - Penghulu: Nurazri Abdul Mustafah (Acting)

Area
  - Total: 361.8 km^{2} (139.7 sq mi)

Population (2021)
  - Total: 727
  - Density: 2.01/km^{2} (5.20/sq mi)
- Time zone: UTC+8 (BNT)
- Postcode: KExx37

Labi (Mukim Labi) is a mukim in the interior of Belait District, Brunei. It has an area of 361.8 square kilometres (139.7 sq mi); the population was 1,216 in 2016.

== Geography ==
The mukim is located in the central and south-western part of the district, bordering Mukim Liang to the north, Mukim Bukit Sawat to the north-east, Mukim Sukang to the east, the Malaysian state of Sarawak to the south and west and Mukim Kuala Balai and Mukim Seria to the north-west. It is regarded as part of Ulu Belait ("Belait Interior"). The mukim is named after Kampong Labi, one of the villages it encompasses.There are also many local fruit orchards such as durian in these two areas which can be an addition to their sources of sustenance in addition to gardening and farming.

== Name ==
Folklore holds that some 70 years ago, a Chinese resident named Ah Lam came across a freshwater turtle in the area and gave it the name Labi.

== Demography ==
As of 2016 census, the population was 1,216 with 54.7% males and 45.3% females. The mukim had 343 households occupying 325 dwellings. The entire population lived in rural areas. The residents of these two villages consist of various races and tribes such as Belait, Kedayan, Dusun, Iban and Chinese and adhere to various religions including Islam, Christianity, Buddhism and others.

== History ==
The first known well for oil exploration in Brunei was drilled not far from the capital, Bandar Seri Begawan, in 1899. Six firms, including Royal Dutch Shell, which began operations in 1913 following the discovery of the Miri field in Sarawak, Malaysia, were involved in the oil search. In 1924, Royal Dutch Shell continued to investigate and discovered some deposit of oil and gas in Labi, all other businesses had left by 1918. A total of 18 oil wells were investigated during that time, but the discovery was too tiny to be exploited, so Royal Dutch Shell abandoned it and the area was then turned into a settlement. Oil exploration started in 1911 at Labi and Bukit Puan, moved to Tutong District in 1923, and finally relocated to Seria, where oil was discovered in 1929.

The Iban tribe established its first settlement in Labi during the 1940s. In Teraja along the river, they constructed the first outlying longhouse, and the inhabitants subsisted off the land. In the past, the area was a major producer of rubber, rice, beeswax, and jelutong, a soft wood that is perfect for carving and pattern-making.

== Administration ==
As of 2021, the mukim comprised the following villages:

Settlements	Population (2021)	Ketua kampung (2024)
Kampong Bukit Puan	122	Hanapi bin Mohd Siput
Kampong Sungai Petai	110	Hanapi bin Mohd Siput
Kampong Tapang Lupak	25	Hanapi bin Mohd Siput
Kampong Tanajor	80	Hanapi bin Mohd Siput
Kampong Ratan	57	Hanapi bin Mohd Siput
Kampong Terunan	19	Hanapi bin Mohd Siput
Kampong Gatas	47	Hanapi bin Mohd Siput
Kampong Kenapol	59	Hanapi bin Mohd Siput
Kampong Labi	22	—N/a
Kampong Labi Lama	4	—N/a
Kampong Mendaram Kecil	58	Muhammad Nurazri bin Haji Abdul Mustafah
Kampong Terawan	43	Muhammad Nurazri bin Haji Abdul Mustafah
Kampong Rampayoh	65	Muhammad Nurazri bin Haji Abdul Mustafah
Kampong Teraja	16	Muhammad Nurazri bin Haji Abdul Mustafah

For administrative purposes the villages above are overseen by two village heads (ketua kampung):

Village head area	Area (km^{2})	Total villages	Villages
Kampong Labi I	136.9	10	Kampong Bukit Puan, Kampong Gatas, Kampong Kenapol, Kampong Melayan Atas, (Note: Not included in the latest census) Kampong Ratan, Kampong Sungai Petai, Kampong Tanajor, Kampong Tapang Lupak, Kampong Terunan, Kampong Tesilin
Kampong Labi II	224.9	5	Kampong Mendaram Besar, Kampong Mendaram Kecil, Kampong Rampayoh, Kampong Teraja, Kampong Terawan
Total	361.8	15 (Note: There is discrepancy of the total villages between what is stated in the latest census and the news article in mention.)	-

== Villages ==
=== Kampong Teraja ===
The head of the Teraja MPK Women's Bureau, Embong Anak Munah, claims that Kampong Teraja has a number of unique wasai (waterfall) fruits in the village's forest that frequently draw visitors and tourists from both domestic and international nations. Wasai Teraja (Teraja Waterfall) is one of the waterfall that is frequently visited. Visitors must register at Rumah Panjang Teraja (Teraja Longhouse) and pay a fee of BND3 for adults and BND1 for children under the age of 12 in order to visit waterfall or any other wasai located in the hamlet. The group will be required to pay BND60 for those who want to hire a villagers-only guide.

In addition to the waterfall, Kampong Teraja is well recognized for the handicrafts made by the locals. Visitors to the Teraja Longhouse who are interested in the art of weaving have been won over by the unique designs and weaving baskets of all sizes and forms. They actively participate in expos and bazaars both domestically and overseas. Teraja Longhouse also has a homestay business to an equal extent. For BND15 per person, guests can opt to spend the night in the Teraja Longhouse's outside "Ruai," or they can pay BND20 per person in the living room. Visitors will have the chance to see cultural events while they are there, including ngajat dance performances, Iban wedding demonstrations, handicraft and weaving displays, and gulingtangan performances. Visitors may go jungle hiking to view the stunning flora and fauna in the Teraja region if they're looking for more strenuous activities.

== Economy ==
Among the products worked on by the residents of Labi Mukim through the Mukim Consultative Council/Village Consultative Council (MPM/MPK) by making handicrafts and woven goods as 1K1P products and also rosella juice. Mukim Labi is also famous for its fertile soil where there are vegetable and fruit gardens. The residents here also partially keep livestock, such as cows, buffaloes and goats, in addition to farming freshwater fish.

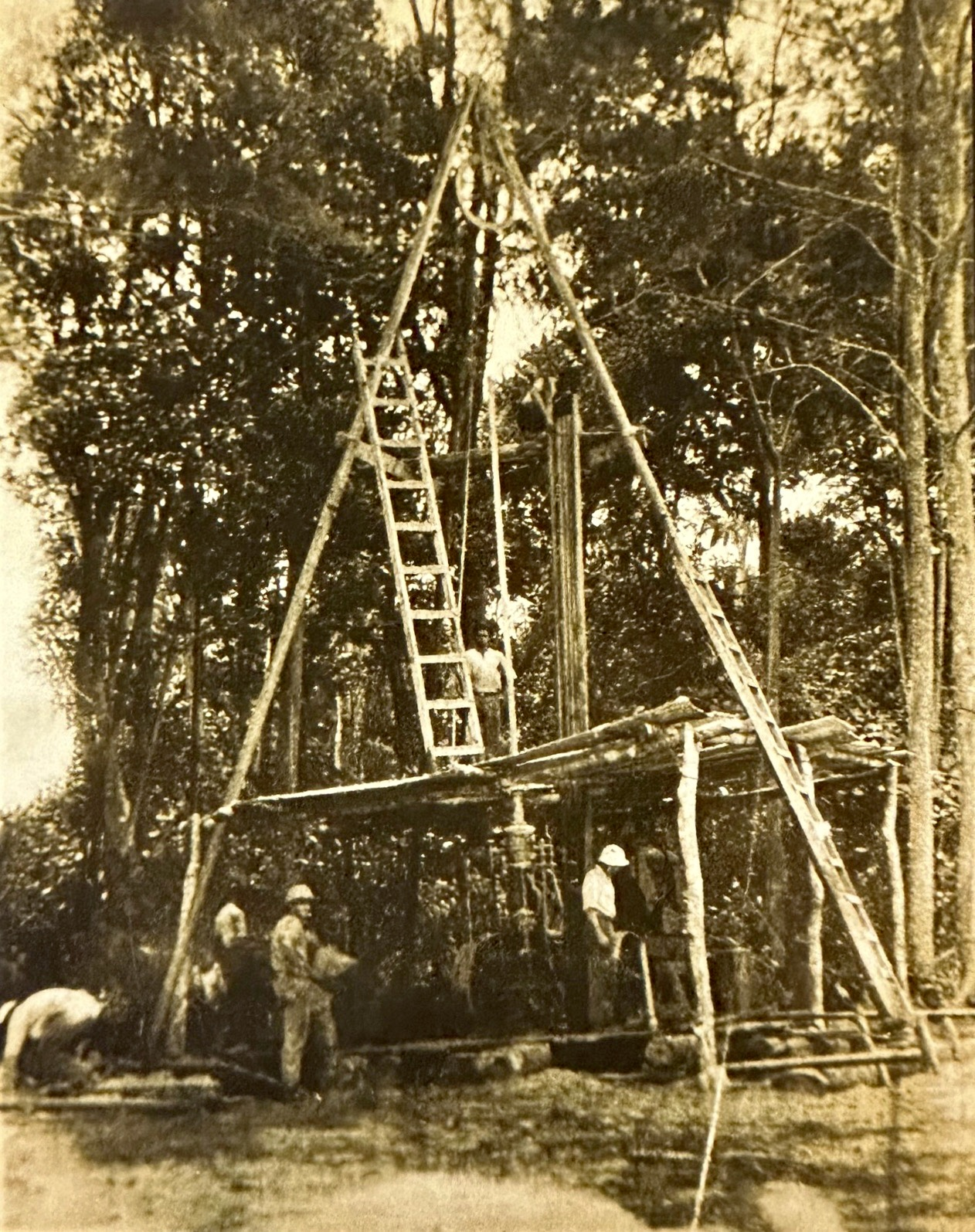
A Labi drilling team as seen in 1926

=== Oil and gas ===
Oil exploration is now possible thanks to current, advanced technology like 3D seismic, aeromagnetic, and 2D seismic methods. The likelihood of finding oil in the region that Royal Dutch Shell abandoned will bear. Brunei Shell Petroleum has given the Australian oil company TAP Energy (Borneo) permission to explore for oil at Block M, which covers a 3,100 square kilometres (1,200 sq mi) region primarily in the remote area of Labi and the southern part of the Tutong District.

As of 2009, BGP, a subsidiary of China National Petroleum Corporation (CNPC), has been given the responsibility of carrying out the seismic acquisition project in Block M. Even for seasoned BGPs, the topographic elements of Tap Oil-operated Block M's hills and jungles present a significant obstacle. To complete the seismic acquisition task on time, BGP has engaged hundreds of Indonesian workers. The construction works and rig-up preparation for the drilling operations on its first exploratory well are nearly finished in 2010, thanks in part to the efforts of Polyard Petroleum International Group and its subsidiaries, China Sino Oil. With its main goal being the delineation and evaluation of oil reservoirs close to proven discoveries in the Belait Anticline, the Mawar-1 will be an exploration well in Block M.

The Mawar-1 onshore exploratory well in Block M has spudded, according to a report from Tap Oil in August 2010, and it should take about 28 days to drill and analyze it without incident. It is the first well to be drilled in Block M since 1988 and the first well for the Brunei National Petroleum Corporation (PetroleumBRUNEI) to be drilled by the Block M Joint Venture.

=== Agriculture ===
The mukim is home to Lot Sengkuang, one of the important rice cultivation area in the country. It was established in 1962, initially on a 20-hectare (49-acre) land. A total of 300 hectares (740 acres) has been dedicated for the purpose of increasing local rice cultivation output. The mukim is also home to the first commercial coffee plantation; the first coffee trees were planted in 2012 and has since grown to about 10,000 trees on a 10-hectare (25-acre) land. Most of the villagers in this area still grow rice which is a normal activity done by the people in this village because rice has been their main food since ages. Rice farming activities are usually done once a year depending on the type of rice planted.

In 2003, it was estimated that Labi produced 607 metric tonnes of vegetables, nearly 1,700 metric tonnes of fruits and 170 metric tonnes of paddy.

== Infrastructure ==
Primary and secondary schools, mosques, police stations, fire stations, community halls, water supply and electricity supply, flats and barracks for government staff and officials and resorts. Facilities in the mukim include:

- Labi Primary School — a government primary school established in 1959
- Chung Hwa School, Labi — a private Chinese primary school established in 1946
- Labi Health Clinic — a community health centre opened in 2002 and has since provided residents with mainly outpatient and dental
- Labi Police Station — established in 1967
- Labi Post Office — established in 1966

=== Religion ===
The first mosque in Kampong Labi, known as Keling Mosque, was built in 1920 by Indian workers, also known as Keling people, with help from nearby locals, according to Orang Kaya Setia Haji Razali bin Haji Mohd. Yusof, Penghulu Mukim Labi. In that year, an estimated 600 Indians came to Kampong Labi, mostly to work for Shell. The Indian workers employed the locals to collect wood while the mosque was being built. Since Kampong Labi's inhabitants were not yet Muslims, Imam Tinggal, a Malay from Sarawak, was chosen as the first Imam once it was finished. Islam was first introduced to the village with the construction of the mosque, and its impact increased when Muslims from Kuala Balai moved to Labi.

The mosque remained open to the locals even after the Indian population in Labi moved to Kuala Belait in 1927. In 1949, a second mosque was constructed in Kampong Labi as the Muslim population grew. Approximately 21 centimetres (8.3 in) in length and 2 centimetres in thickness, the new building was built using the boards from the previous mosque, which showed exceptional resilience despite being 67 years old. With government assistance, a new mosque was built in 1974 to replace the second one, costing B$270,000. A beduk crafted from cowhide by Tuan Imam Haji Ahmad bin Metassim in 1952 is one example of an artifact that was moved to the new mosque from the second mosque. The present day Kampong Labi Mosque became the sole mosque in the mukim, inaugurated on 22 June 1979; it can accommodate 200 worshippers.

=== Tourism and recreation ===
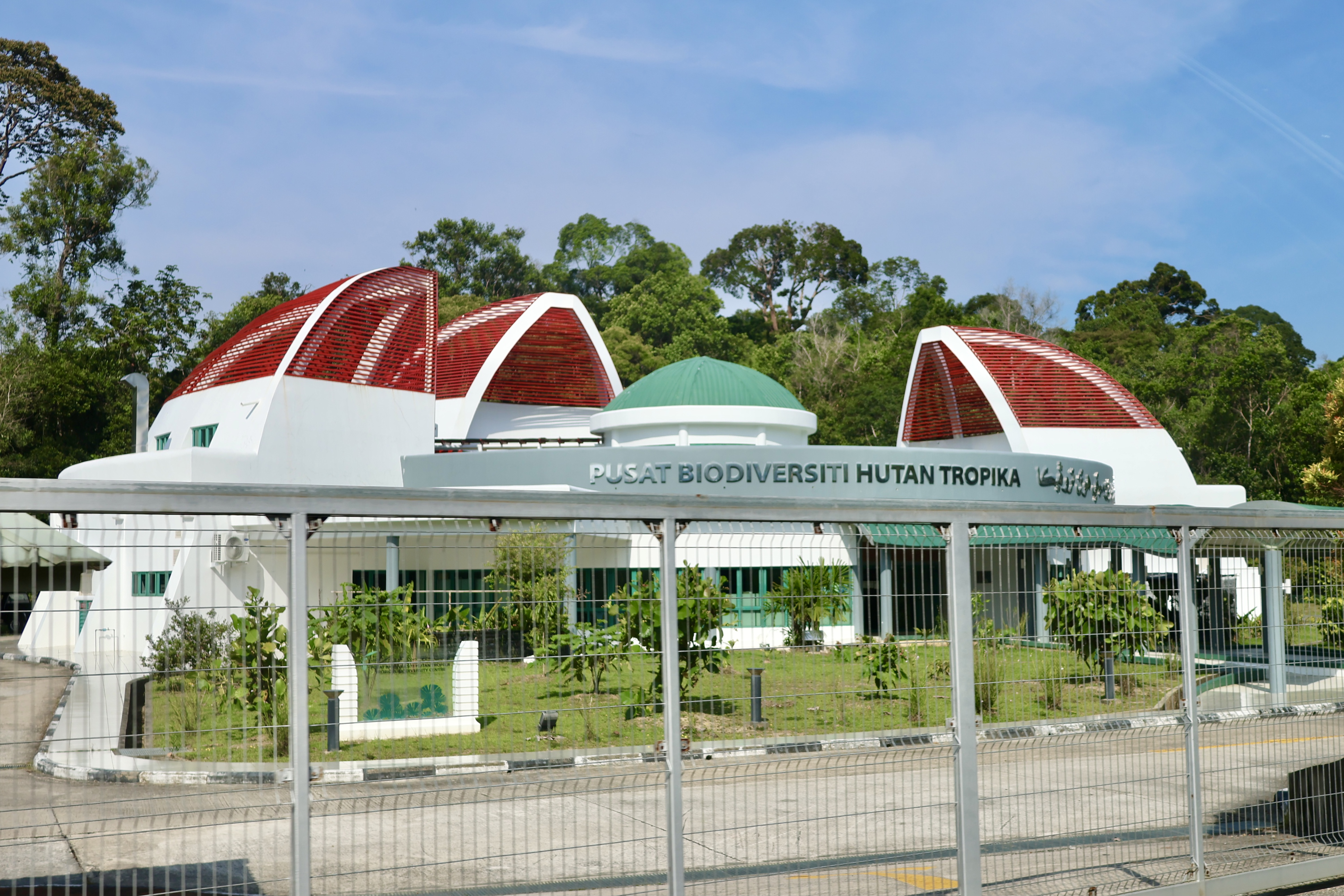
Tropical Biodiversity Centre

Tourist attractions and recreation parks in the mukim include:

- Tropical Biodiversity Centre — a public learning hub about the country's biodiversity
- Luagan Lalak Forest Recreation Park — a recreation park built around and on a pond
- Teraja Longhouse — a longhouse in Kampong Teraja
- Rampayoh Longhouse — a longhouse in Kampong Rampayoh
- Mendaram Besar Longhouse — a longhouse in Kampong Mendaram Besar
- Belulok Waterfall — a waterfall in Labi
- Teraja Waterfall — a waterfall from Teraja River
- Wong Kadir Waterfall Resort Park — a popular picnic spot with its waterfall with jungle trekking and camping.
- Bukit Labi Forest Reserve — a 270 hectares park covered with marshland and fresh water. During the rainy season, the lake will be filled with water and during the dry season it will dry up.

== Notable people ==
- Shari Ahmad, a military officer

== See also ==
- 2012 Rampayoh helicopter crash
