= Bristow Helicopters =

British civil helicopter operator

Bristow Helicopters Limited
- Bristow logo and wordmark
IATA	ICAO	Call sign
UH	BHL	BRISTOW
- Founded: 1955; 71 years ago, Scotland, United Kingdom
- Fleet size: 490 aircraft
- Parent company: Bristow Group Inc.
- Traded as: NYSE: VTOL; S&P 600 component
- Headquarters: Houston, Texas, U.S.
- Key people: Chris Bradshaw (CEO)
- Revenue: ▲US$1.67B (FY 2014)
- Operating income: ▲US$177m (FY 2014)
- Net income: ▲US$187m (FY 2014)
- Total assets: ▲US$3.54B (FY 2014)
- Total equity: ▲US$1.77B (FY 2014)
- Website: BristowGroup.com

Bristow Helicopters Limited (IATA: UH, ICAO: BHL), is a British civil helicopter operator, founded in 1955; 71 years ago in Scotland within the United Kingdom, and originally based at Aberdeen Airport in eastern Scotland. Bristow Helicopters is currently a part of the United States-based Bristow Group Inc (NYSE: VTOL), with its corporate headquarters in Houston, Texas, within the United States of America. In 2020, Bristow Group was merged with Era Helicopters, a large U.S.-based commercial helicopter operator, which was previously a division of Era Aviation; with the two companies then continuing to use the Bristow name.

Bristow Helicopters was established by Alan Bristow in June 1955. Two years later, it acquired its first pair of helicopters, namely the Westland Widgeon. The company quickly expanded overseas, as well as various services; including helicopter training (aircrew and ground crew), oil exploration facilitation, search and rescue, and charter flights. Having entered the African market in 1960, Nigeria became Bristow's biggest profit source during the 1970s. Entering North Sea operations, also during the 1960s, Bristow became Aberdeen Airport's largest single employer during the 1980s, and was operating the majority of offshore flights in the North Sea.

The company went through repeated changes in ownership during the 1980s and 1990s; leading to its current acquisition by American helicopter operator Offshore Logistics in 1996. As a result of corporate rebranding in February 2006, Offshore Logistics became legally known as Bristow Group Inc.

Bristow Helicopters Limited (in the United Kingdom) holds a UK Civil Aviation Authority (CAA) Type A Operating Licence; it is permitted to carry passengers, cargo, and mail, on aircraft with 20 seats or more, for commercial gain.

In the United States, the U.S. division of Bristow is a Federal Aviation Administration (FAA) approved Part 135 air carrier. On 11 May 2019, the United States division of Bristow Group operations entered Chapter 11 bankruptcy protection, affecting North America operations; overseas operations were unaffected by this, and continued existing normal operations. After an aggressive expansion earlier in the decade, helicopter aviation demand was cut back as crude oil prices dropped, and the total debt of Bristow Group Inc. reached US$1.44 billion by 30 September 2018. Bristow Group completed the UK's Eastern Airways sale on 10 May 2019, and still wishes to sell its interest in Australia's Airnorth, hoping to achieve US$230 million combined.

== History ==
'Bristow Helicopters Limited' traces its origins back to the endeavours of British inventor, aviator, and businessman Alan Bristow. A former test pilot for both the Royal Navy and Westland Helicopters, Bristow had chosen to invest his earnings into forming multiple companies, the first of which being 'Air Whaling Ltd'. In June 1955, he opted to establish Bristow Helicopters Limited after securing a contract for the supply of helicopter crews at Shell to support rigs in the Persian Gulf. During 1957, Bristow Helicopters received a contract from BP, which allowed the firm to purchase its own helicopters, a pair of Westland Widgeons. That same year, having realised that few companies could afford helicopter services, Bristow began to seek work around the globe; the company soon launched successful ventures into both Iran and Bolivia.

In 1960, Bristow Helicopters chose to enter the African market via the acquisition of crop-spraying specialist 'Fison-Airwork', which had also operated in locations in Central America and the UK. Bristow opted to discontinue crop-spraying activities in favour of focusing on oil exploration work in Nigeria on behalf of Shell; by the start of the Biafran War in 1967, the company had a fleet of eleven helicopters committed the Nigerian oil exploration operation, based at Port Harcourt. Early on in the conflict, Bristow helped to evacuate oil workers in the region to the safety of Fernando Po; despite the risks, Bristow maintained its Nigerian operations throughout the three years of war via a reduced presence in Lagos and Warri. This decision to remain gave the company a head-start on rivals as oil companies returned to the region after the war's end. Throughout much of 1970s, Nigeria proved to be Bristow's biggest profit source; it continued to grow through the decade via contracts from Shell, Mobil, Texaco, and other companies.

In the mid-1960s, Bristow opted to enter the North Sea market; being the second helicopter operator (after BEA Helicopters Limited) to establish operations at Aberdeen Airport in eastern Scotland; it was relatively well positioned to take advantage of the region's oil boom. Starting on 17 February 1965, the company operated the Westland Wessex 60 ten-seat helicopter to support these off-shore installations. Throughout the 1970s, Bristow would expand its Aberdeen operation, its main oil and gas support hub being based at Dyce Airport; in 1972, the company allocated the first of several Sikorsky S-61N to Sumburgh Airport in support of Shell's offshore rigs in the northern area of the North Sea. Following an expansion programme, which included the building of new on-site accommodation for workers and their families, around thirty S-61N flights were routinely flying daily from Sumburgh, supported by round-the-clock maintenance coverage, at the peak of operations during the 1970s. During the 1980s, Bristow became Aberdeen Airport's largest single employer, its personnel in Aberdeen having increased one-hundred-fold, as well as operating the majority of offshore flights in the North Sea. In 1980 alone, nearly 400,000 passengers and over 2,300 tons of freight passed through Bristow's Aberdeen terminal.

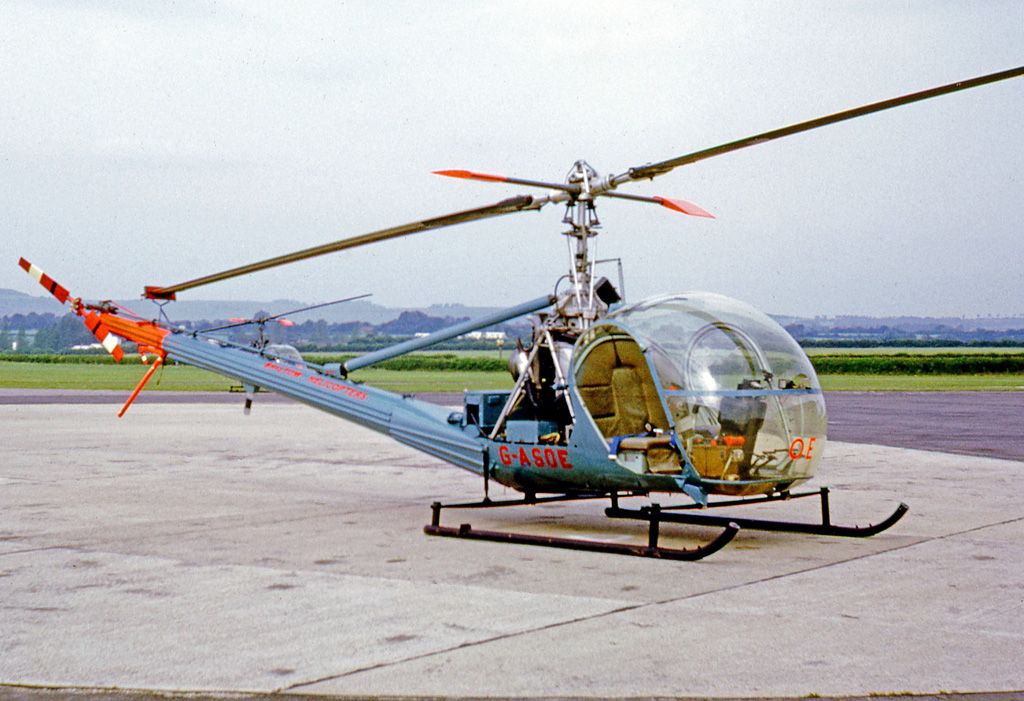
Hiller UH-12C used by Bristow to train Army Air Corps pilots.

Another key source of business was the provision of training services; in 1961, Bristow Helicopters commenced training of helicopter pilots on behalf of the Royal Navy at Redhill Aerodrome, Surrey; further training contracts were quickly secured from other helicopter operators in India, Australia, and New Zealand. By 1970, Bristow had also established a training joint venture in Iran, although this was discontinued after the Iranian Revolution of 1979. During the late 1960s, Bristow Helicopters operated a fleet of Hiller UH-12 training helicopters based at AAC Middle Wallop, which were used to train flight crews on behalf of the Army Air Corps. In 1986, the company began training overseas pilots at its flying school at Redhill Aerodrome; this programme ran for many decades, being rebranded as the 'Bristow Academy'. In addition to pilot training, Bristow has also been involved in training ground crew, having started sponsoring students at the Nigerian College of Aviation Technology, (NCAT), Zaria, in 1986.

Starting in 1971, Bristow Helicopters began providing civilian search and rescue (SAR) services in the United Kingdom; replacing military Westland Whirlwinds with Bristow-operated Sikorsky S-55s at RAF Manston in Kent, south-east England. The then-unfamiliar concept of using a private company for SAR services led to a public outcry and intense lobbying efforts thus, after three years, operations were turned back over to RAF Coastal Command. Bristow reentered the UK's SAR sector in 1983 when it commenced operations on behalf of the Maritime and Coastguard Agency (MCA) from Sumburgh Airport in the Shetland Islands; the company held the contract until 2007, and secured it again in June 2013. Other locations, including Stornoway on the Isle of Lewis in the Outer Hebrides, and Lee-on-Solent, and Portland in southern England, would also be operated by Bristow on behalf of MCA. Over the years, Bristow's SAR units have responded to multiple incidents, including rescue efforts in the recovery of survivors of the Piper Alpha disaster.

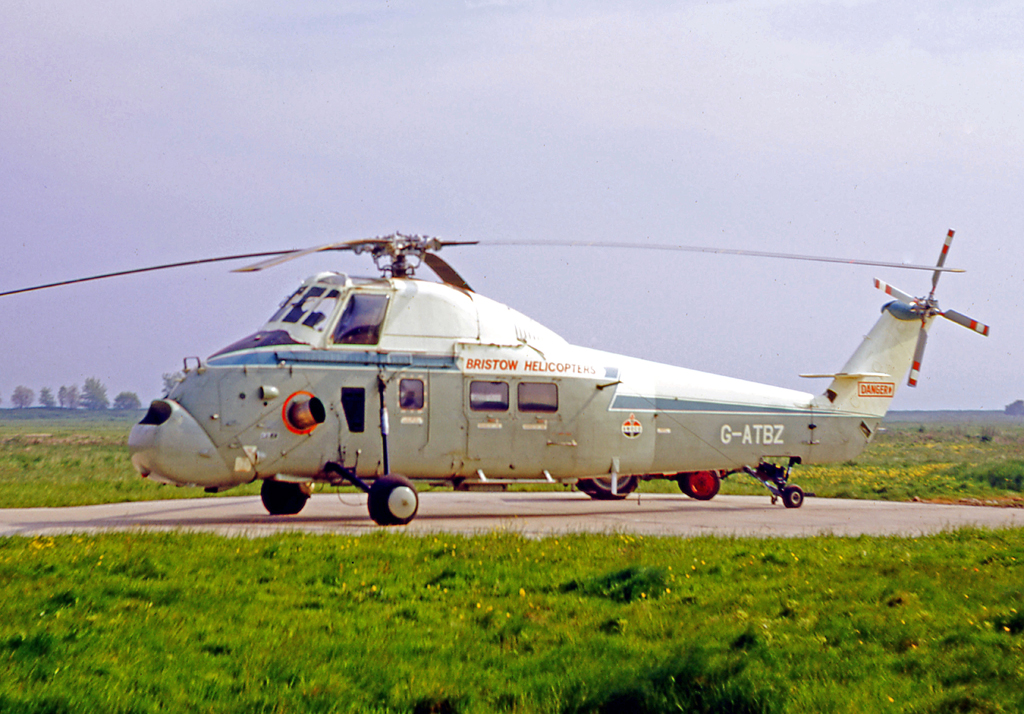
Bristow Westland Wessex 60 helicopter in 1970.

During the early 1970s, the backbone of Bristow's fleet consisted of the Westland Whirlwind, Westland Wessex, and Bell 206, along with a handful of other types, including several fixed-wing Britten-Norman BN-2 Islanders. By the 1980s, Bristow had entirely phased out the Whirlwinds and Wessexes; the bulk of its fleet came to consist of Bell 206s, Bell 212s, and Sikorsky S-76s, amongst other types, during this period. Bristow was in fact the first European operator to adopt the Sikorsky S-76 into commercial service. The company also played a leading role in the development of the Aérospatiale Super Puma, having consulted with Aerospatiale to shape its design for the oil and gas market, branding it 'Tiger', rather than 'Super Puma' for its own fleet. Bristow decided to place a large order for thirty-five Super Pumas, or 'Tigers', this being the largest civil helicopter order to have been made at the time; the first examples of the type were introduced in early 1982.

Within the company's first three decades, Bristow Helicopters had expanded into the provision of various helicopter-based services, including the provision of pilot training, search and rescue coverage, cargo transportation, and charter flights, in addition to its more traditional helicopter transport services. The business had also developed a worldwide presence within a similar timeframe, providing its services in the North Sea, Middle East, South America, Africa, Asia, India, Bermuda, Trinidad, Australia, and New Zealand.

The company went through repeated changes in ownership during the 1980s and 1990s. In 1985, Bristow Helicopters was acquired by British and Commonwealth Holdings plc. That same year, Alan Bristow stood down from his active role in managing the company. It was soon sold on as a component of the Bricom Group via a management buy-out in 1988. In July 1990, Bricom was acquired by Scandinavian investment company Rochfield. In 1991, Bristow Helicopters was subject to another management buy-out, headed by managing director and chief executive Bryan Collins.

In 1996, Bristow Helicopters was purchased by 'Offshore Logistics', an American offshore helicopter operator which previously operated as 'Air Logistics' in the U.S. Gulf of Mexico and Alaska, and was structured as a reverse takeover. The group operates and maintains a global fleet of over 400 aircraft. In February 2006, Offshore Logistics opted to re-brand itself as the 'Bristow Group Inc.'. In January 2010, Bristow announced the retirement of the Air Logistics name, and Gulf of Mexico operations would operate under the Bristow brand.

The Bristow Group expanded their portfolio in April 2007, with the purchase of Helicopter Adventures, a Florida-based flight school; Helicopter Adventures was subsequently renamed 'Bristow Academy'. The deal also provided the Bristow Group with the world's largest civilian fleet of Schweizer aircraft.

In January 2019, it was announced that Bristow would acquire Columbia Helicopters for $560 million. The deal was later cancelled, and Bristow paid Columbia a $20 million termination fee.

It was announced in April 2022 that Bristow Group was to acquire British International Helicopters (BIH) in an all cash transaction; the sale was completed on 2 August 2022. The purchase included all of BIH's aircraft, employees, and existing contracts. The BIH name and branding will be phased out and replaced by that of the wider Bristow Group.

== Current operations ==
=== Joint ventures ===
In addition to its wholly owned international operations, Bristow Group maintains service agreements and equity interests in helicopter operators in Brazil, Canada, Colombia, Egypt, Kazakhstan, Turkmenistan, Mexico, Norway, and Russia (Sakhalin), along with its foundin country: the United Kingdom. This allows Bristow to extend its range of services into new and developing oil and gas markets, and helps provide a lower cost structure in some operating areas. Partners include:

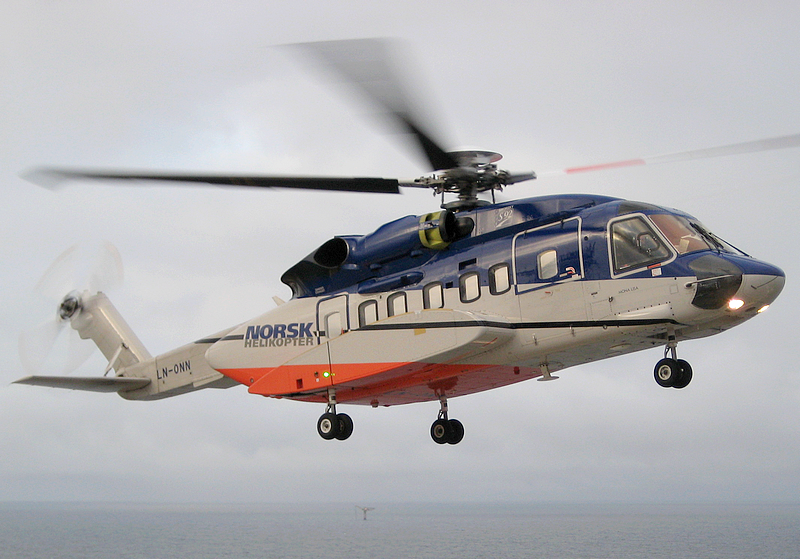
Norsk Helikopter-scheme.

- Cougar Helicopters
- Helicopteros Nacionales de Colombia, Helicol S.A., Colombia
- Petroleum Air Services, Egypt
- Atyrau Bristow Airways Services (ABAS), Kazakhstan
- Turkmenistan Helicopters Limited, Turkmenistan
- Heliservicio Campeche, Mexico
- Norsk Helikopter, Norway – now Bristow Norway
- Sakhalin Bristow Air Services AKA Aviashelf, Sakhalin, Russia
- FBH Limited, UK

Fixed Wing Bristow has controlling interests in Eastern Airways which is a regional airline based in the U.K. operating fixed wing regional jet and turboprop aircraft and Airnorth, also a regional airline, based in Australia operating fixed wing regional jet and turboprop aircraft. Both Eastern Airways and Airnorth operate scheduled passenger services, shuttle flights for oil and gas industry personnel, and charter services.

Although not a joint venture, in 2015 Bristow and AgustaWestland agreed to develop offshore and search and rescue capabilities for the AW609 tiltrotor. This could simplify a typical trip from Clapham Common to an oil rig by using just one aircraft. Bristow intends to order more than 10 tiltrotors.

=== Search and rescue ===
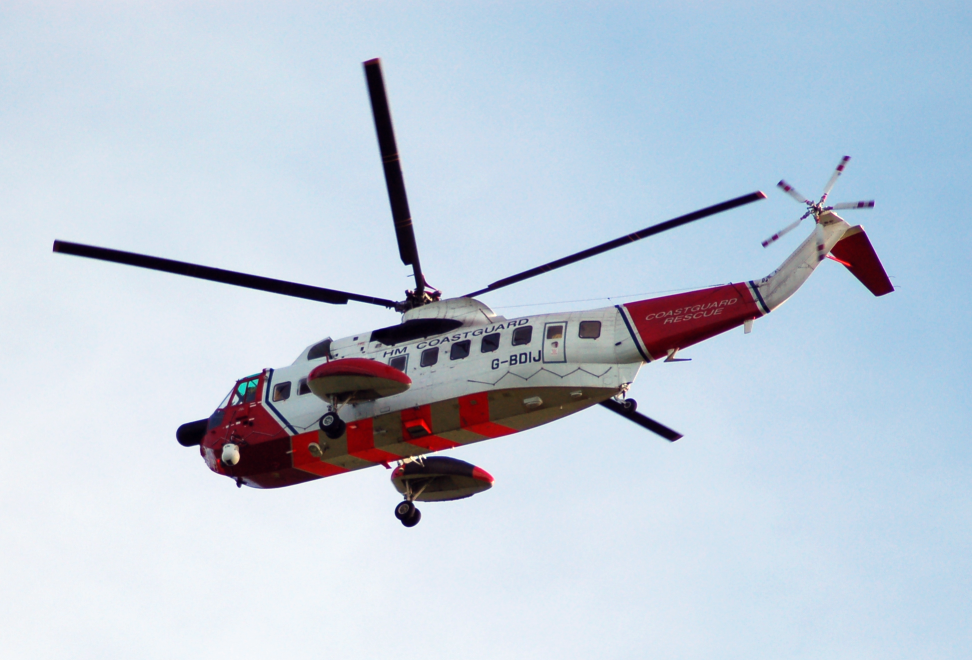
Sikorsky S-61N G-BDIJ operating for His Majesty's Coastguard.

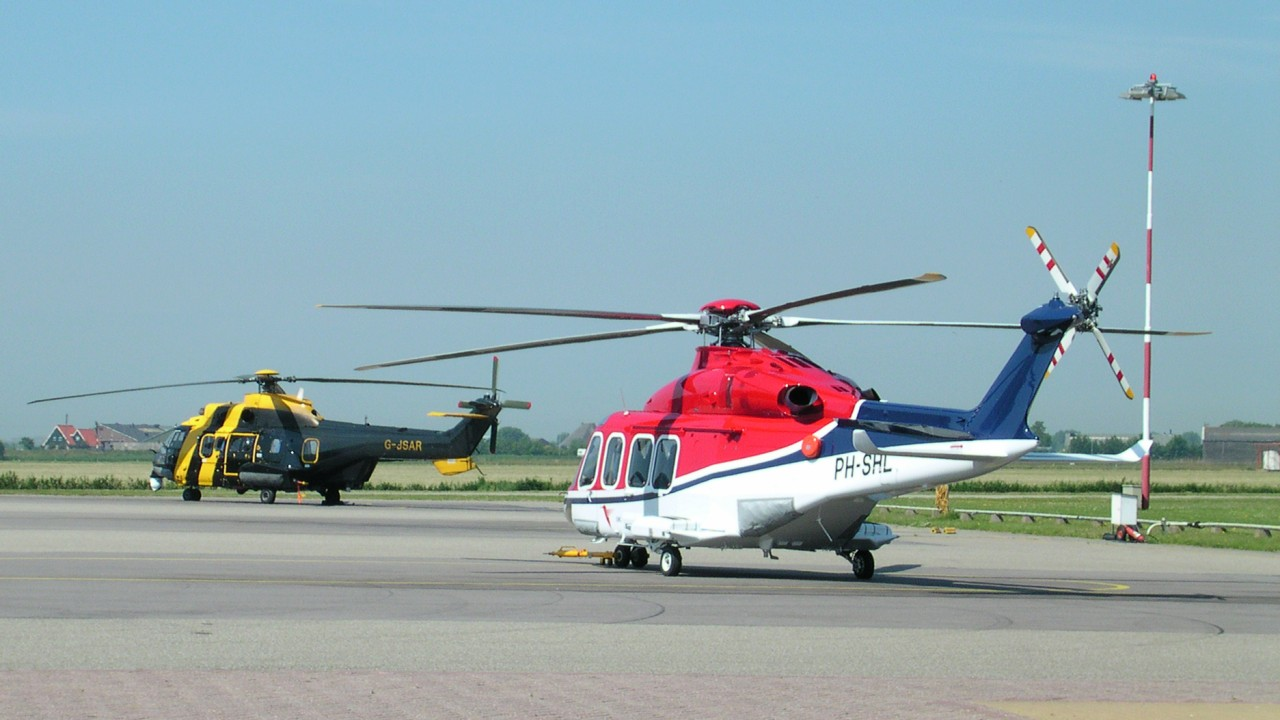
Bristow Helicopter G-JSAR at De Kooy Airfield; G-JSAR was configured a search and rescue helicopter.

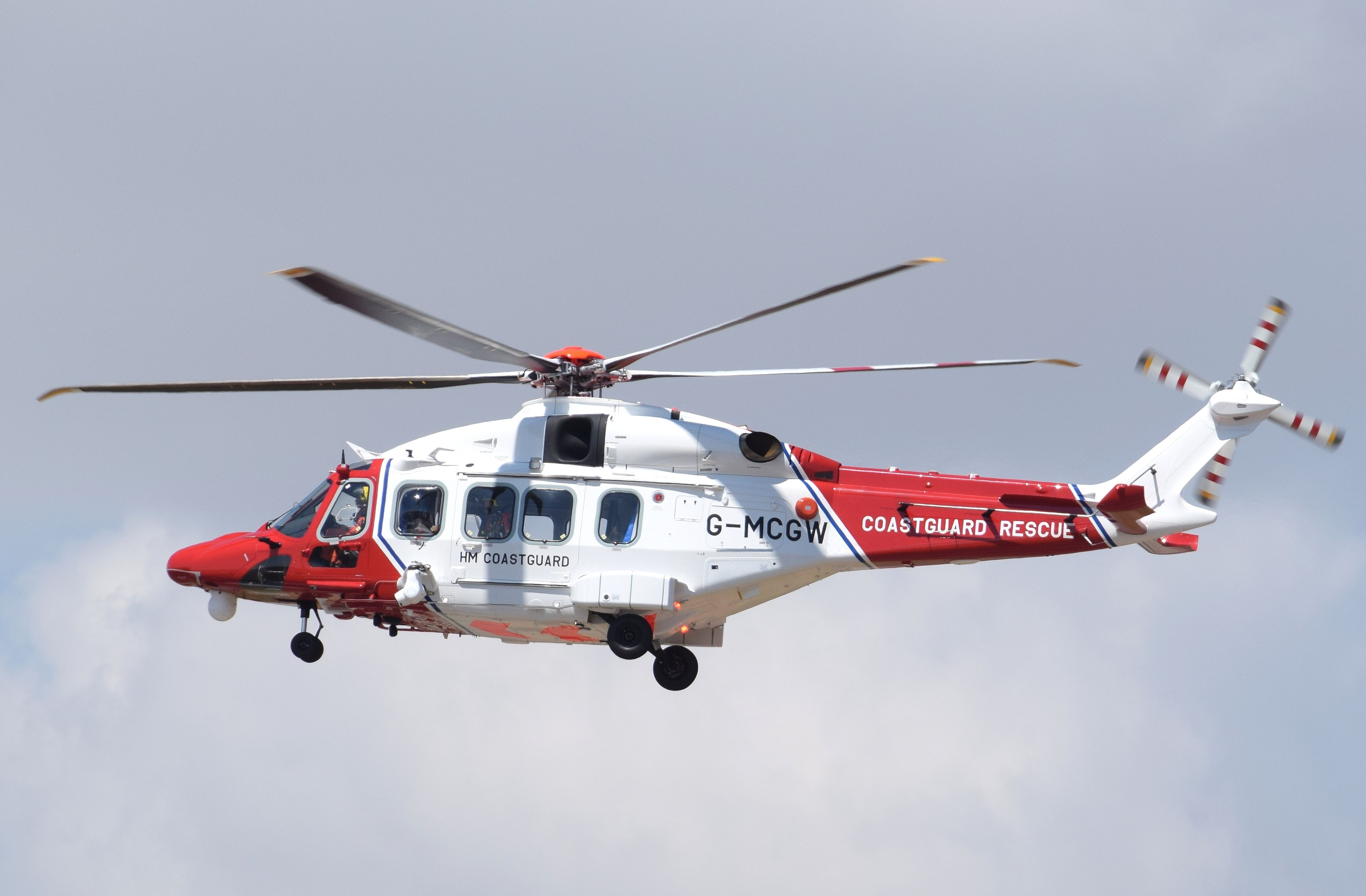
AgustaWestland AW189 G-MCGW search and rescue helicopter of His Majesty's Coastguard, operated by Bristow Helicopters, 2018.

Bristow helicopters operated Sikorsky S-61N helicopters on behalf of His Majesty's Coastguard, the United Kingdom's coastguard, until July 2007 after which there was a 12-month transitional period whilst CHC Helicopter took over the contract replacing the S-61N with new helicopters.

Bristow operated four dedicated Search and Rescue (SAR) sites in the UK, on behalf of HM Coastguard. The units were located at Portland (EGDP) and Lee-on-Solent (EGHF) on the south coast of England, at Stornoway (EGPO) in the Outer Hebrides, and at Sumburgh (EGPB) in the Shetland Isles.

Northern North Sea services operated from Aberdeen (EGPD), Scatsta (EGPM) and Stavanger (ENZV).

Southern North Sea services operate from Norwich (EGSH), Humberside (EGNJ) and Den Helder (EHKD) with its support organisation based at Redhill (EGKR).

Bristow S-61N's were responsible to carry out SAR tasks, operating from Den Helder Airport on behalf of the oil and gas industry.

On 26 March 2013, Bristow was awarded a 10-year contract to operate the search and rescue operations in the United Kingdom, at the time being provided by CHC Helicopter (on behalf of HM Coastguard), the Royal Air Force and the Royal Navy. Bristow is currently operating AgustaWestland AW139, AgustaWestland AW189 and Sikorsky S-92 helicopters in support of this contract.

As part of its acquisition of British International Helicopters, Bristow also operates support as well as search and rescue helicopters out of RAF Mount Pleasant in the Falkland Islands. Two Sikorsky S-92 helicopters are used for everyday military transport and land logistic support around the islands, where there are few roads and a 12-mile (19 km) strip of sea separates the two main islands. Search and rescue is conducted using two AW189 helicopters.

In July 2022 it was announced that Bristow had been awarded a second ten-year contract.

== Fleet ==
Bristow operates a large fleet of nearly 500 helicopters and aircraft, which includes unconsolidated affiliates and joint venture partners. Bristow intends to reduce fleet variety from twenty-four helicopter types to six. For its subsidiary Airnorth fixed-wing jet and turboprop aircraft, see Airnorth.

== Accidents and incidents ==
The following is a list of notable accidents and incidents of Bristow Helicopters owned and / operated aircraft; since its foundation until the present day:

- On 4 April 1967, '5N-ABQ', a Scottish Aviation Twin Pioneer Series 1, crashed in Nigeria during a single engine approach.
- On 13 August 1981, 'G-ASWI', a Westland Wessex 60 lost power to the main rotor gearbox, causing a loss of control during the ensuing autorotation. The flight was carrying 11 gas workers from the Leman gas field to the Bacton Gas Terminal in Norfolk, East Anglia. All persons onboard were lost.
- On 14 September 1982, 'G-BDIL', a Bell 212 crashed into the North Sea near the Murchison oil platform while on a night-time search and rescue mission.
- On 4 July 1983, 'G-TIGD', an Aerospatiale AS332L Super Puma crashed whilst attempting to land at Aberdeen Airport. During the approach to Aberdeen from the North Hutton platform, a loud bang was heard, followed by severe vibration. A PAN-PAN call was made to air traffic control by the flight crew. Shortly before landing, control was lost, and G-TIGD struck the runway heavily on its side; 10 of 16 passengers received serious injuries. A tail boom panel had become detached in flight and damaged all five tail rotor blades. The resulting imbalance to the tail rotor assembly led to the separation of this unit and subsequent loss of control.
- In 1984, 'G-BJJR', a Bell 212, crashed with the loss of two crew on approach to the Cecil Provine.
- On 5 December 1991, 'VR-BIG', an Australian-registered Bristow-owned Aerospatiale SA-330J Puma, ditched in Mermaid Sound at Dampier, Western Australia, after a pick-up from a departing LNG tanker during night visual flight rules (VFR) conditions; it entered a vortex ring state. After ditching, it stayed afloat for over two hours.
- On 14 March 1992, 'G-TIGH', an Aerospatiale Tiger (Bristow's own name for its Aerospatiale Super Puma), lost altitude and crashed whilst ferrying passengers from the Cormorant Alpha to the flotel Safe Supporter (accommodation). Of the two crew and fourteen passengers onboard, one crew member and ten passengers were lost.
- On 19 January 1995, 'G-TIGK', an Aerospatiale AS-332L Super Puma operating on Bristow Flight 56C between Aberdeen Airport and various oil rigs in the North Sea, was struck by lightning. The flight was carrying sixteen oil workers from Aberdeen to an oil platform at the Brae oilfield. All persons onboard survived.
- On 16 July 2002, 'G-BJVX', a Sikorsky S-76A operated by Bristow Helicopters from its UK southern base at Norwich Airport, crashed into the southern North Sea whilst it was making a ten-minute flight between the gas production platform Clipper and the drilling rig Global Santa Fe Monarch, after which it was due to return to Norwich Airport. The 22-year-old helicopter was flying at an altitude of about 320 feet (98 metres), when workers on the Global Santa Fe Monarch heard "a loud bang". Witnesses watched the G-BJVX steeply dive into the sea; one also reported seeing the helicopter's rotor head with rotor blades attached falling into the sea after the body of the helicopter had impacted. The accident caused the death of all those onboard (two flight crew members and nine Shell worker passengers). The body of ten persons were recovered, the eleventh man was never recovered.
- On 22 November 2006, 'G-JSAR', a Eurocopter Super Puma configured for search and rescue (SAR) ditched in the North Sea. Although United Kingdom registered, G-JSAR was being operated from Den Helder Airport in the Netherlands, on behalf of Netherlands-based oil companies. All onboard survived uninjured.
- On 12 August 2015, '5N-BGD', a Sikorsky S76C+ returning to Lagos, Nigeria, from an offshore rig with ten oil workers crashed into the Lagos lagoon close to the 11.8 kilometres (7.3 miles) long third mainland bridge, the longest of three bridges connecting the Lagos mainland to the island. 5N-BGD was five minutes away from landing at the Murtala Muhammed International Airport in Lagos. Four oil worker passengers and the two flight crew died, whilst six others were rescued alive.

== In popular culture ==
- Whirlwind – a novel by James Clavell, first published in 1986, which was inspired by the true struggle of Bristow Helicopters to escape the revolutionary forces and get their employees and equipment out of the unstable, deteriorating situation in Iran. Much of the story mirrors these and other contemporary events.

== See also ==
- Bristow Norway (formerly Norsk Helikopter) – a Norwegian helicopter company which transports offshore personnel to oil installations in the North Sea
- Petroleum Helicopters International
