= Flotel =

Living quarters on bodies of water

Flotel, a portmanteau of the terms floating hotel, is the installation of living quarters on top of rafts or semi-submersible platforms. Flotels are used as hotels on rivers or in harbour areas, or as dwelling for working people, especially in the offshore oil industry.

== Deepwater Horizon oil spill ==
Flotels were extensively used to house cleanup workers for the 2010 Deepwater Horizon oil spill in the Gulf of Mexico. Cities along the shore in some cases were unable to accommodate the large number of workers needed for the cleanup, so BP used flotels to house some of the workers. BP told the media that flotels were convenient because they allowed workers to be close to cleanup sites, lessening travel time.

== Coronavirus pandemic ==
In Singapore, two floating hotels, the Bibby Renaissance and Bibby Progress were served as quarantine ships before March 2021 during the Coronavirus pandemic.
