= Shelkovskoy =

Shelkovskoy (masculine), Shelkovskaya (feminine), or Shelkovskoye (neuter) may refer to:

- Shelkovskoy District, a district of the Chechen Republic, Russia
- Shelkovskaya, a rural locality (a stanitsa) in the Chechen Republic, Russia
