= 2005 Shelkovsk incident =

Unknown illness in Chechen schools

Shelkovsk incident
- Native name: Шелковской район
- Date: December 2005
- Location: Shelkovskoy District, mostly in the village of Starogladovskaya; 43.638°N 46.415°E
- Cause: Toxic substance; Other explanations of being stress induced
- Target: Schools in Shelkovskoy District
- Deaths: 3
- Injuries: 100 reported

The 2005 Shelkovsk incident was an incident in Chechnya where there was a mass outbreak of respiratory problems, seizures, and other symptoms suggestive of nervous system hypersensitivity alongside hallucinations, and "strange laughter" among children and teachers from specific schools. Doctors who treated the patients diagnosed them with "an intoxication of unknown aetiology". After the hospitalisation of 19 children and 3 adults on December 16, 2005, a government commission chaired by V Boriskina (Deputy Chief of Staff of Alu Alkhanov) with Russian military specialists and chemical defence officers called in. In total about 100 people, mostly children, were hospitalised with signs of poisoning.

== Course of the outbreak ==
The first case was recorded when 13-year-old Taisa Minkailova, a pupil at the Starogladovsk school started suffering asphyxia attacks, spasms, a severe headache and numbness in her extremities and was admitted to hospital in Kizlyar, Dagestan. Then on December 9 two high school seniors at the same school were taken to a hospital in Grozny. On December 19 hospitalization peaked with 19 children and 3 adults being hospitalized with similar symptoms. This precipitated a government commission being formed by the regional government assisted by the Russian military.

== Symptoms ==
The symptoms observed in patients included respiratory distress, panic attacks, seizures, severe muscle spasms (one woman was described as having her feet touching the back of her head), nausea, vomiting, diarrhea, hallucinations (often accompanied by disturbing laughter), muscle weakness, amnesia, coma, severe headaches, numbness, pain (initially in the eyes and mucous membranes), chills, high blood pressure, and nosebleeds. Doctors attending the patients could not identify a specific cause but diagnosed the cases as the result of "an intoxication of unknown aetiology".

The symptoms also mirror very closely those observed at an incident that happened in 2000 at Starye Atagi when two faint explosions followed by columns of smoke 150m high that hung over the village. An epidemiological report stated:

"A day after the explosions, the first cases occurred showing signs of poisoning: powerful tonic spasms, loss of consciousness, aggressive agitation, inhibited movement, uncontrollable vomiting, severe headaches, sensation of fear and, in some, haemoptysis [coughing up blood]."

Of the 23 victims of this event 3 died.

== Explanations ==
=== Findings by the Russian government commission ===
The Government Commission released its findings on December 23 and concluded:

1. No evidence of chemical poisoning
2. No potentially dangerous objects were revealed on the school premises
3. Final diagnosis: dissociative (conversional) disorders - dissociative disorders of movement and sensation, dissociative disorders of motor activity, dissociative spasms
4. The commission has come to the conclusion that there was an outbreak of mass hysteria in the Shelkovsk region related to the prolonged emergency situation in the Chechen Republic.

However before the findings from the commission were released a leaked memo from a military specialist that was submitted to the chairman was obtained by Anna Politkovskaya and other journalists from Novaya Gazeta The leaked memo confirmed the presence of a toxic substance which led to the poisoning of the teachers and school children. The memo stated:

"The source of the poisoning was located in the main school building, presumably on the second floor [where the ill teachers were working]. The primary route of intoxication could be the respiratory tract, though direct contact is not ruled out. The aggregate state of the toxic substance was probably a liquid or solid, which, under the effects of the environment, could separate into poisonous vapors. It is not possible to determine accurately the form of the toxic substance from only one clinical picture [the victims' symptomology]. Recommended: in order to clarify what the toxic substance was, conduct toxicological testing of the victims and have this examined by toxicology specialists with the necessary equipment and reagents."

=== Skepticism and other explanations ===
Parents, journalists, and attending doctors were entirely skeptical of the commission's findings. The chief doctor of the Shelkovskoi hospital (which treated many of the patients) and Huseyn Nutayev (head of the Shelkovskaya administrative district where the schools were located) suggested that the illness was the result of nerve gas, however due to Chechnya's poor medical infrastructure especially after its devastation by war the only way to test for such substances was via military labs. Chechen separatist leaders agreed with this explanation, accusing Russia of testing new chemical weapons on Chechen civilians.

Other explanations by outside doctors include mercury poisoning, and ethylene glycol. Sultan Alimkhadzhiev deputy health minister and head of pediatrics of the Grozny hospital supported the official explanation that the illness was entirely psychosomatic. The chief narcologist of Chechnya at the time said the cause was from Chechen children being exposed to situations of stress. However, local residents dismissed this explanation and asserted that if this was the case then it would first of all affect children from Grozny, who had to hide for weeks under the intense bombardment of the city a few years prior. Furthermore, the Shelkovskaya region had not been subject to active hostilities in the war.

== Aftermath ==
On 22 December psychiatrist Musa Dalsayev (chief narcologist of the Chechen Republic) accused an assembly of the parents of the sick children of encouraging them to fake seizures in order to claim money from the state (despite no claims having been made).

On 25 December hospitals started discharging most of the victims. 17 children and 3 adults who were seriously ill were sent to a secure psychiatric facility. Those who continued to suffer symptoms were attacked by government officials as "malingerers".

Some of the sickest victims were sent to a medical academy clinic in Stavropol where they were treated. However the patients were not told what medicines were used, the results of any tests, or what they were being treated for. After being discharged, their medical records did not include any such information either. Results of tests carried out on them or other victims of the events were never released by the commission or any other governmental authority.
