= Mil Mi-8 =

Family of transport helicopters

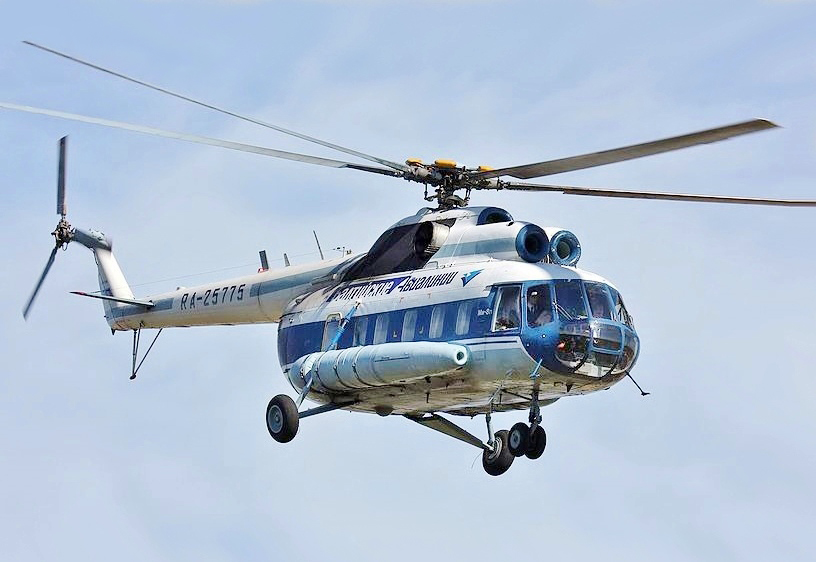
- Mil Mi-8 of Baltic Airlines taking off at Peter and Paul Fortress in Saint Petersburg

General information
- Type: Transport helicopter (also several armed versions)
- National origin: Soviet Union/Russia
- Manufacturer: Kazan Helicopter Plant; Ulan-Ude Aviation Plant
- Designer: Mil Moscow Helicopter Plant
- Status: In service
- Primary user: Soviet Union (historical); Russia; Approx. 80 other countries, see Operators below
- Number built: >17,000 and production continues today; world's most-produced helicopter

History
- Manufactured: 1961–present
- Introduction date: 1967
- First flight: 7 July 1961
- Variant: Mil Mi-8M/Mi-17
- Developed into: Mil Mi-14; Mil Mi-24

The Mil Mi-8 (Russian: Ми-8, NATO reporting name: Hip) is a family of medium twin-turbine helicopters, originally designed by the Soviet Central Aerohydrodynamic Institute (TsAGI) in the 1960s and introduced into the Soviet Air Force in 1968. As of 2024, Russian production of the aircraft model continues. In addition to its most common role as a transport helicopter, the Mi-8 is used as an airborne command post, armed gunship, and reconnaissance platform.

The Mi-8 is the world's most-produced helicopter, with over 17,000 units used by over 50 countries. As of 2015, when combined with the related Mil Mi-17, the two helicopters are the third most common operational military aircraft in the world.

== Design and development ==
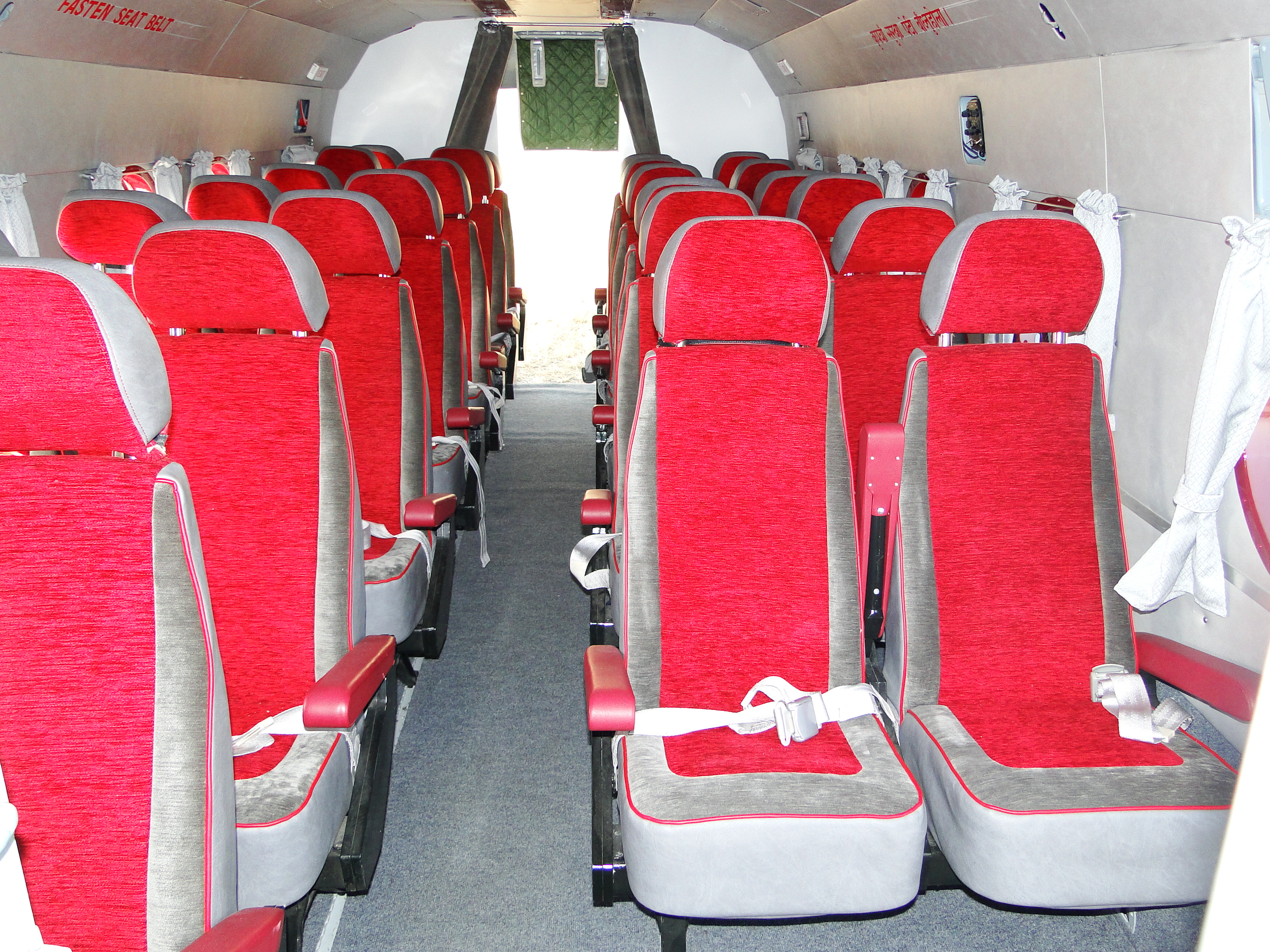
Passenger cabin of a Shree Airlines aircraft

Mikhail Mil originally approached the Soviet government with a proposal to design an all-new two-engined turbine helicopter in 1959 after the success of the Mil Mi-4 and the emergence and effectiveness of turbines used in the Mil Mi-6. After design and development, the Mi-8 was subsequently introduced into the Soviet Air Force in 1967.

The Soviet military originally argued against a new helicopter, as they were content with the current Mil Mi-4. To counter this, Mikhail Mil proposed that the new helicopter was more of an update to new turbine engines instead of an entirely new helicopter, which persuaded the council of ministers to proceed with production. Due to the position of the engine, this enabled Mikhail Mil to justify redesigning the entire front half of the aircraft around the single engine.

The prototype, which was named V-8, was designed in 1958 and based on the Mil Mi-4 with a larger cabin. Powered by an AI-24 2,010 kW (2,700 shp) Soloviev turboshaft engine, the single engined V-8 prototype had its maiden flight in June 1961 and was first shown on Soviet Aviation Day parade (Tushino Air Parade) in July 1961.

During an official visit to the United States in September 1959, Nikita Khrushchev took a flight in the S-58 presidential helicopter for the first time and was reportedly extremely impressed. On Khrushchev's return, he ordered the creation of a similar helicopter, which was to be ready for the return visit by the American president, to save face. A luxury version of the Mi-4 was quickly created and Khrushchev took an inspection flight, during which Mikhail Mil proposed that his helicopter in development was more suitable. However, it would be necessary to have a second engine for reliability.

This gave Mikhail Mil the power under the orders of Khrushchev to build the original two-engined helicopter, which for the first time in Soviet history would need purpose-built turbine engines, rather than those adapted from fixed wing aircraft (as in the Mil Mi-6 and the first prototype V-8) and an entirely new main rotor gear box that would be designed in-house for the first time. In May 1960, the order was given for Mikhail Mil to create his twin engine helicopter. The Sergei Isotov Design Bureau accepted the task of creating the engines.

The second prototype (still equipped with the one turbine engine as the Isotov engines were still under development) flew in September 1961.

Two months after the engines were completed by Isotov, the third prototype designated V-8A equipped with two 1,120 kW (1,500 shp) Isotov TV2 engines, made its first flight piloted by Nikolai Ilyushin on 2 August 1962, marking the first flight of any Soviet helicopter to fly with purpose built gas turbine engines. The aircraft completed its factory based testing in February 1963.

The fourth prototype was designed as a VIP transport, with the rotor changed from four blades to five blades in 1963 to reduce vibration, the cockpit doors replaced by blister perspex slides and a sliding door added to the cabin.

The fifth and final prototype was a mass production prototype for the passenger market. In November 1964, all joint testing had been completed and the Soviet government began mass production. Production started in the Kazan Production Plant, with the first aircraft completed by the end of 1965.

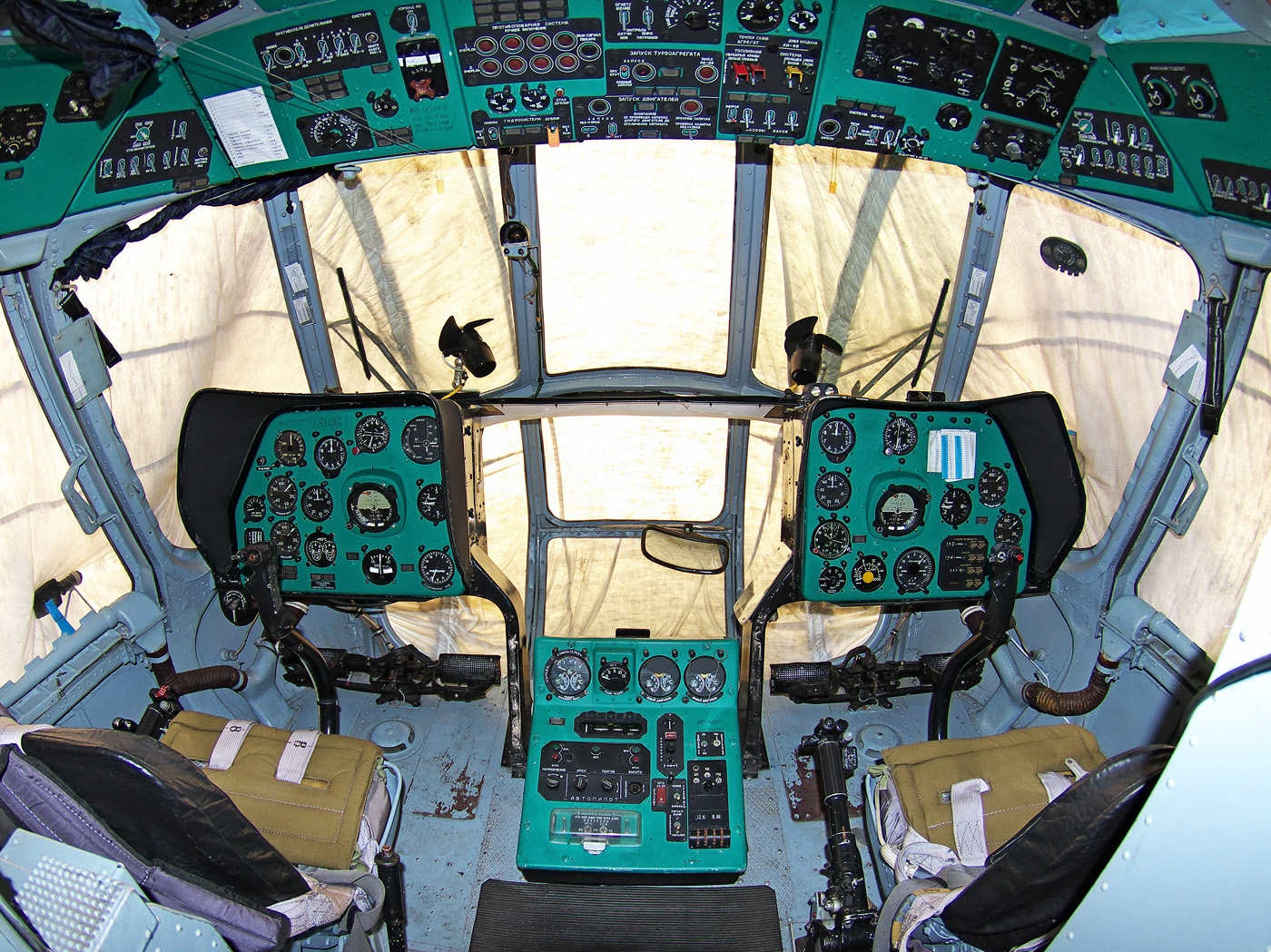
Cockpit view

The Soviet military originally showed little interest in the Mi-8 until the Bell UH-1's involvement in the Vietnam War became widely publicised as a great asset to the United States, allowing troops to move swiftly in and out of a battlefield and throughout the country. It was only then that the Soviet military rushed a troop-carrying variant of the Mil Mi-8 into production. By 1967, it had been introduced into the Soviet Air Force as the Mi-8.

There are numerous variants, including the Mi-8T, which, in addition to carrying 24 troops, is armed with rockets and anti-tank guided missiles. The Mil Mi-17 export version is employed by around 20 countries; its equivalent in Russian service in the Mi-8M series. The only visible differences between the Mi-8 and Mi-17 are A) the position of the tail rotor (Mi-8 right side, Mi-17 left side), B) the shape of the exhausts (Mi-8 circular, Mi-17 oval), and C) Dust shields in front of engine air intakes for the Mi-17. Also Mi-17 has some improved armour plating for its crew. The naval Mil Mi-14 version is also derived from the Mi-8.

The Mi-8 is constantly being improved and the newest version still remains in production in 2024. However the second generation of the Mi-8 was changed to a tractor-tail rotor configuration as this configuration has increased yaw authority from the upwards advancing tail rotor blades into the downwash. The increase of the airspeed flowing over the rotor blades increases overall tail rotor effectiveness and yaw authority, whereas with the 'Pusher' tail rotor configuration the advancing rotor blade moves downwards. This decreases the airspeed across the rotor blade, reducing its overall effective yaw authority.

== Operational history ==
=== Finland ===
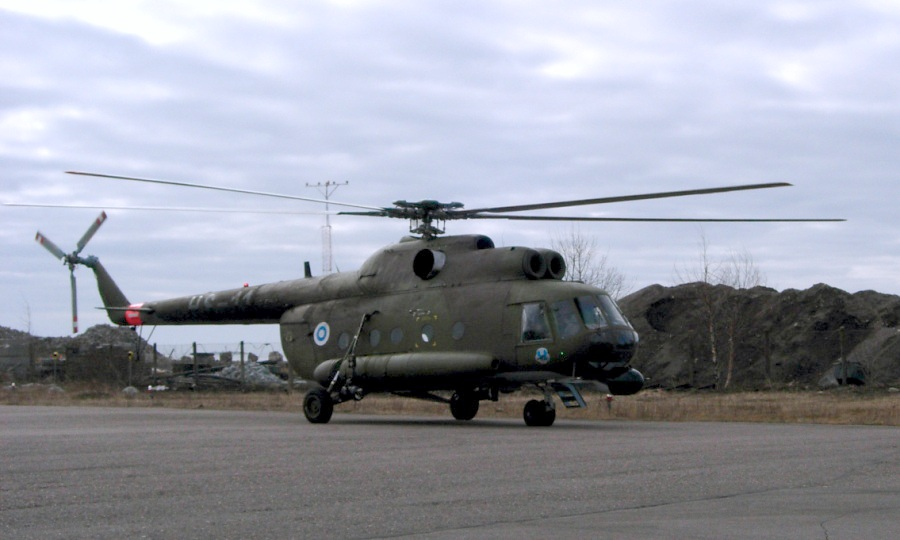
Finnish Mi-8 in Hernesaari, Helsinki, in 2005

The Finnish Defence Forces and the Finnish Border Guard began using Mi-8s in the 1970s, with the Finnish Air Force receiving its first, serialed HS-2, on 28 May 1973, and the second, HS-1, on 31 May 1973. Six Mi-8Ts were obtained at first, followed by further two Mi-8Ts and two Mi-8Ps. Three of the helicopters were handed over to the Border Guard Wing. One of these was lost after sinking through ice during a landing in April 1982. It was soon replaced by a new Mi-8.

After their Border Guard service, the helicopters were transferred to the civil register, but shortly thereafter to the Finnish Air Force. In 1997 it was decided that all helicopters, including the remaining five Mi-8Ts and two Mi-8Ps, should be transferred to the Army Wing at Utti. All Mi-8s have now been retired. One Mi-8 is on display at the Finnish Aviation Museum in Vantaa, and one is at the Päijänne Tavastia Aviation Museum in Asikkala, near Lahti. One Mi-8T is on display in Tuulos. The two final Mi-8Ts were given to Hungary in August 2011 with all the remaining spare parts.

=== Georgia ===
The Georgian air force started operating Mi-8 and Mi-17 helicopters from 1991 onwards. During the War in Abkhazia (1992–1993) Mi-8 helicopters were used by both sides. Several were shot down, the first being a Georgian civilian Mi-8T which was destroyed in Sukhumi by an RPG-7. On 14 December 1992, a Russian Air Force Mi-8T was shot down by a SA-14 missile near Lata.

On another occasions Abkhaz Mi-8MTVs were shot down by Georgian forces, by SA-14 in one case and by RPG-18 in a second case, both during 1993. In the final case, Georgian Mi-8MTV carrying civilian refugees was shot down, killing 25 people. Georgian Air Force and Police currently operate about 20 Mi-8T/MTVs.

=== India ===
The Indian Air Force inducted the Mi-8 in the 1970s as part of a growing rotary-wing fleet that evolved without centralised long-term planning. Acquired in the wake of geopolitical deals and stop-gap needs, the Mi-8 formed the backbone of medium-lift capability before being succeeded by the Mi-17.

=== Iraq ===
Mi-8s were employed by the former Iraqi Army Aviation and Iraqi Air Force under Saddam Hussein. In the Iran–Iraq War of the 1980s, there were air-to-air combat between Iraqi and Iranian Army Aviation helicopters, including between Iranian Bell AH-1J Cobras and Iraqi Mi-8s.

=== South Sudan ===
United Nations Mil Mi-8MT in 2019

On 21 December 2012, a Nizhnevartovskavia owned Mi-8 working for the United Nations Mission in South Sudan (UNMISS) was shot down and crashed near Likuangole in the South Sudanese state of Jonglei during the South Sudan internal conflict. All four Russian crewmembers on board were killed, and after some initial confusion, a UN spokesman said that the South Sudanese army confirmed on 22 December that it mistakenly fired at the helicopter.

On 26 August 2014, a UTair Aviation owned Mi-8 working for the United Nations crashed as it approached a landing airstrip near Bentiu. Three of the Russian crew members died and one was injured. Rebel commander Peter Gadet claimed that his forces brought it down using a rocket-propelled grenade.

=== Soviet Union ===
The Mi-8 family of helicopters became the main Soviet (and later Russian) helicopter, covering a large range of roles in both peace time and war time. Large fleets of Mi-8 and its derivatives were employed by both military and civil operators.

Large numbers of Mi-8 family helicopters were used during the Soviet–Afghan War during the 1980s. Its rugged construction allowed easier in-theater operations and maintenance. A large number of Mi-8s were lost with several shot down by enemy fire, with the Mi-8 and its derivatives being the main aircraft model lost by the Soviet Union in Afghanistan.

Between April and May 1986, Mi-8s were used in large numbers to drop radiation-absorbing materials into the No. 4 reactor of Chernobyl Nuclear Power Plant after the Chernobyl disaster, and the fire was extinguished by the combined effort of helicopters dropping over 5000 metric tons of sand, lead, clay, and neutron-absorbing boron onto the burning reactor and injecting liquid nitrogen into it. Most of the helicopters were severely irradiated and abandoned in a giant junkyard, the so-called "machines cemetery" near Chernobyl, with several disappearing from the site in later years. During the initial operation, one crashed near the power plant after hitting a construction crane cable with all the crew of four being killed in the crash. It is now known that virtually none of the neutron absorbers reached the core.

=== Ukraine ===
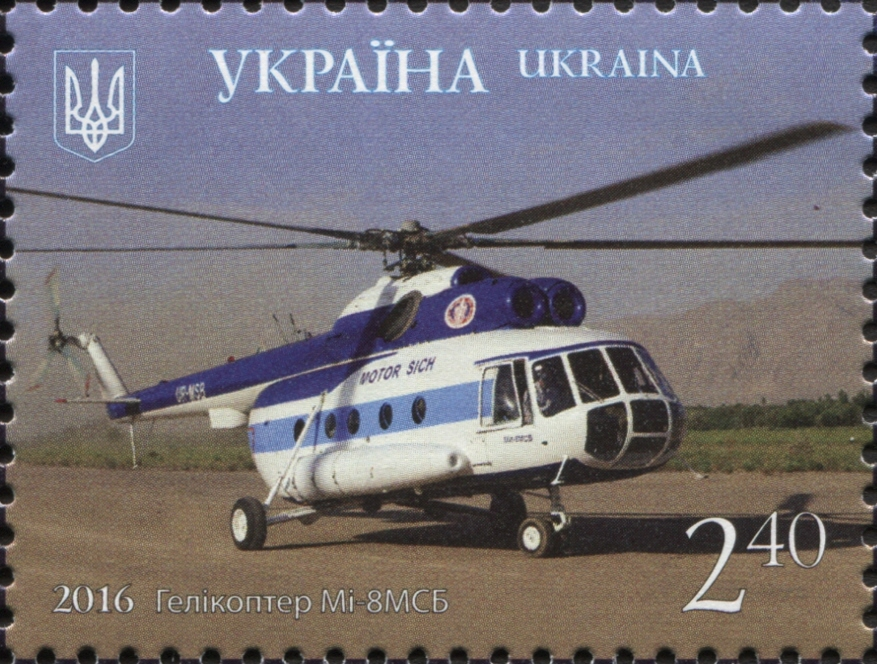
Mi-8MSB on a 2016 Ukrainian stamp

On 16 August 2013, the Ministry of Defense of Ukraine reported that one of its Mi-8MSB had set a world altitude record of 9,150 metres (30,020 ft) at the Kirovske military airfield on 15 August.

The Ukrainian Armed Forces used Mi-8MSB along with Mi-24s in operations against separatists in Eastern Ukraine during the Russo-Ukrainian War. On 29 May 2014, a Ukrainian National Guard Mi-8 was brought down by Russian separatist forces in Donbas using a MANPADS near Slavyansk with 12 personnel, including an Army general, killed and one seriously injured. On 24 June 2014, a Ukrainian National Guard Mi-8 was shot down by separatist forces again using a MANPADS near Slavyansk with nine personnel killed. Ukrainian forces used Mi-8 helicopters to resupply forces during the Siege of Mariupol at Azovstal iron and steel works and bring in additional reinforcements for the Azov Regiment. Some 16 Mi-8s were used a number of times, two of which were shot down. Russia claimed on 5 April that it shot down two Ukrainian Mi-8s that it said were being used to evacuate commanders of the Azov Regiment. In late August 2023, it was reported that a Russian defector named Maksym Kuzminov handed over a Mi-8AMTSh to the Ukrainian forces in coordination with Ukrainian Intelligence agents.

On 16 October 2023, Ukrainian Colonel General Oleksandr Syrskyi said that the 25th Separate Airborne Brigade had shot down a Mi-8 without supplying the location. According to the Oryx database 63 Mi-8 helicopters have been shot down in Ukraine thus far during the war, 29 of them being Ukrainian, and 34 Russian respectively.

On 31 July 2024, a Russian Mi-8 helicopter was shot down over occupied Donetsk by Ukrainian FPV drones. The first time a helicopter in combat was destroyed by a drone. The Mi-8 was believed to have been attacked on the ground either during landing or take off.

On 31 December 2024, a Russian Mi-8 was shot down by a MAGURA V5 sea drone armed with R-73 Sea Dragon missiles near Cape Tarkhankut, Crimea, while a second helicopter was damaged but managed to return to base, according to the Main Directorate of Intelligence.

As of 17 November 2025, Ukraine has lost 28 Mi-8 helicopters with one damaged during the Russian invasion of Ukraine. Russian losses currently stand at 41 destroyed, with 12 damaged, and 1 lost through defection.

On 6 June 2025, a Russian Mi-8 was destroyed at Bryansk International Airport by a Ukrainian drone, and a Russian Mi-35 nearby was also damaged during the attack.

On 29 September 2025, the 59th Assault Brigade destroyed a Russian Mi-8, near the village of Kotliarivka, Pokrovsk district, Donetsk Oblast. Using a $500 FPV drone, according to the Ukrainian commander of the Unmanned Systems Forces Major Robert “Madyar” Brovdi.

On 18 May 2026, a Telegram channel announced that Russian Mi-8MTPPR-1 had been lost through an unknown cause. One of five lost during the war in Ukraine according to the Oryx (website).

On 1 October 2026, a Mi-8 was shot down by a Su-35S, in a friendly fire incident, over Voronezh Oblast killing all three crew onboard. The helicopter being mistaken for a UAV.

On 30 October 2026, the 3rd Assault Brigade destroyed a Russian Mi-8, using Hornet drones, “dozens of kilometres” behind the frontline in the Luhansk Region. The first Hornet chased the helicopter but it escaped, the second struck it when it had landed.

=== United States ===
During the initial stages of Operation Enduring Freedom, Mi-17s and Mi-8s were extensively used by the CIA and US Special Forces to assist the Northern Alliance in their fight against the Taliban.

A number of Mi-8s and Mi-17s are used by US government agencies as of 2022.

=== Yugoslavia ===
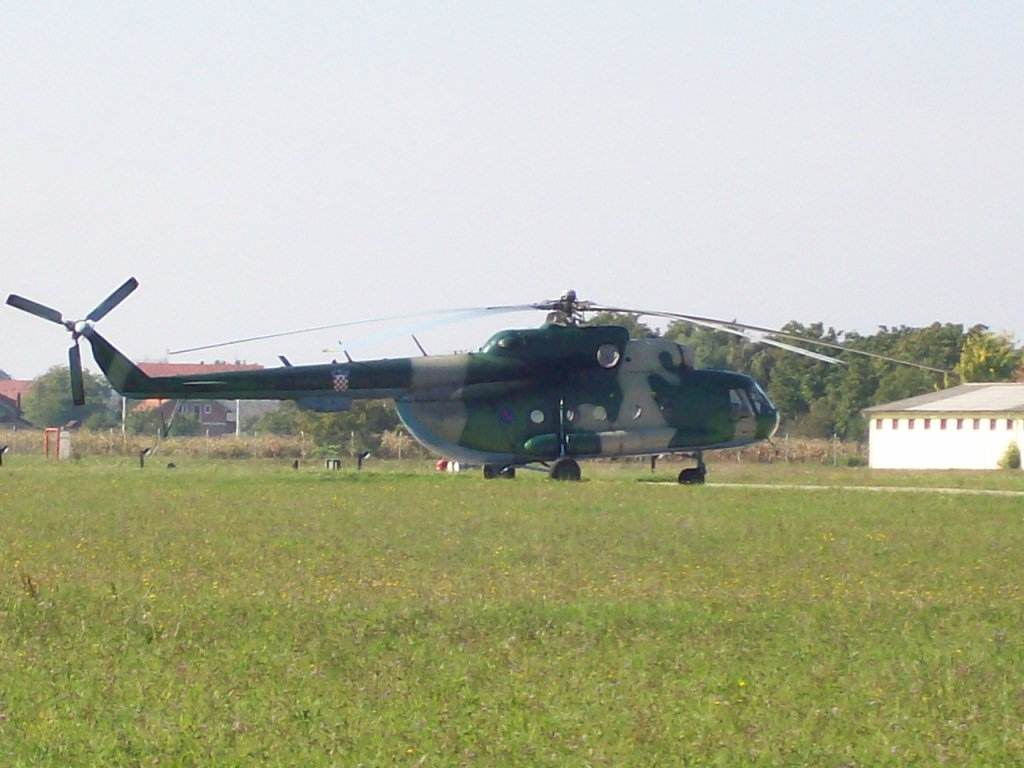
Croatian Mil Mi-8MTV-1

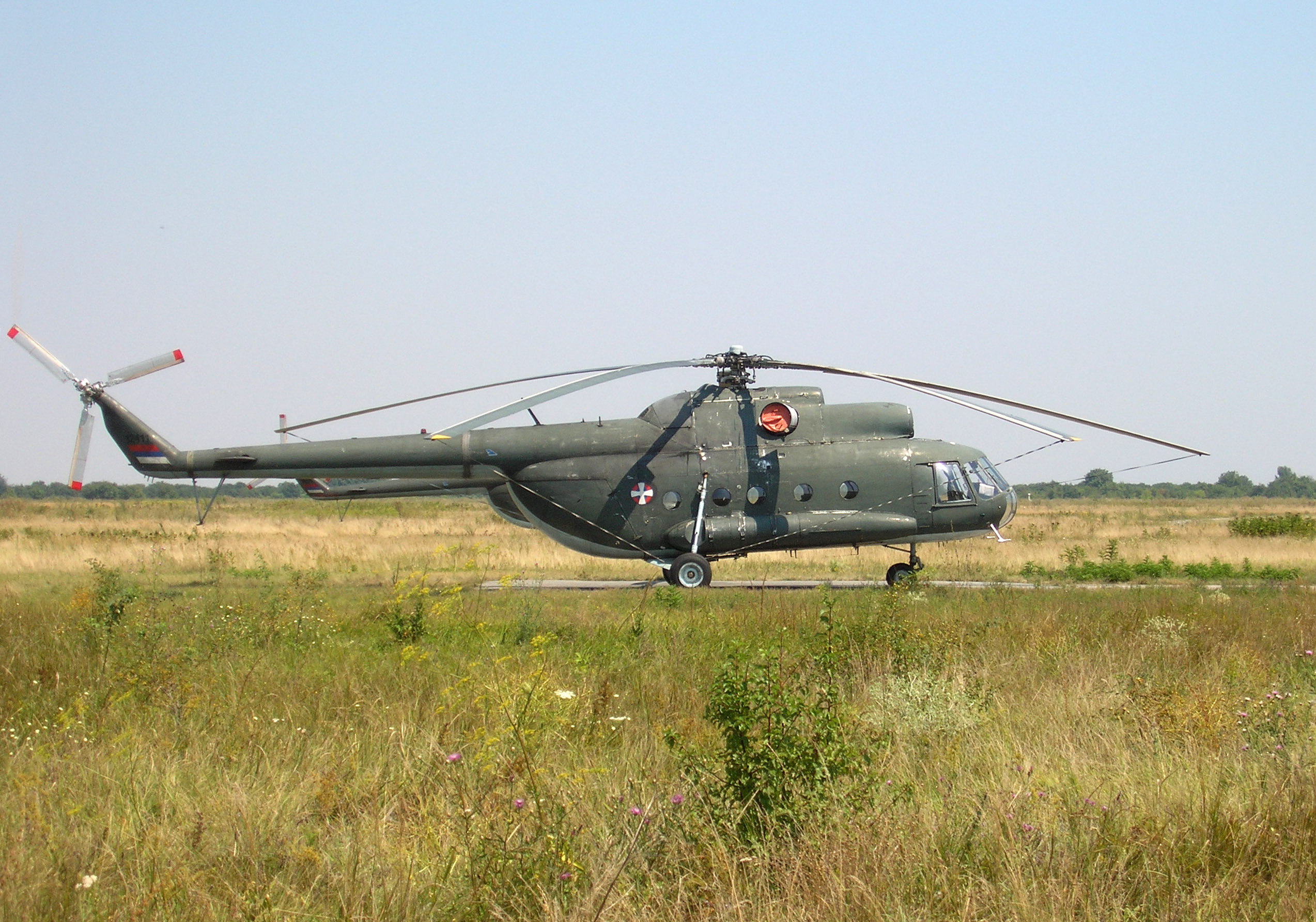
Serbian Mi-8T cargo helicopter

The Yugoslav Air Force took delivery of 24 Mi-8T (Hip C) transport helicopters between May 1968 and May 1969 to equip two squadrons of the newly formed 119th transport regiment from Niš military airport, each squadron with 12 helicopters. Subsequently, from 1973 to the early 1980s, Yugoslavia purchased more Mi-8T helicopters to re-equip two squadrons of 111th regiment from Pleso military airport near Zagreb and the 790th squadron from Divulje military airport near Split, which was under the command of the Yugoslav Navy. In total, the Yugoslav Air Force received 92 Mi-8Ts, designated by the Yugoslav People's Army as the HT-40, while local modification of several helicopters into electronic warfare variants produced the HT-40E. Some 40 helicopters were equipped for firefighting operations.

The Yugoslav Mi-8s' first combat operations were transport of Yugoslav People's Army troops and federal police forces to border crossings in Slovenia on 27 June 1991 during the Ten-Day War. The members of Slovenian Territorial Defence fired Strela 2 MANPAD, and shot one helicopter down, killing all crew and passengers.

During combat in the winter of 1991 in the Croatian war and in the spring of 1992 in the Bosnian War, the Yugoslav People's Army used the Mi-8 fleet for the evacuation of injured personnel, transport of cargo and search and rescue for the crews of aircraft forced down. As most flights were made behind the front, the Croatian forces were able to down just one helicopter, which was hit by small arms fire near Slavonski Brod on 4 October 1991.

After Bosnian Serbs declared their state in the spring of 1992, some former Yugoslav Air Force Mi-8s continued service with the Republika Srpska armed forces. The inventory of the 82nd mixed helicopter squadron, of the 92nd aviation brigade of the Army of Republika Srpska comprised 12 Mi-8T helicopters, which continued in service until Operation Koridor. During that period, the Republika Srpska Air Force lost three Mi-8 helicopters to enemy fire. Three helicopters painted in a blue and white colour scheme flew in the first part of 56th helicopter squadron of the Krajina Milicija, using Udbina military airport in Lika as their main base. The Republika Srpska Air Force continued to operate nine helicopters, albeit suffering problems with maintenance and spare parts, until it was formally disbanded in 2006.

On the other side, Mi-8 helicopters were also used as main air transport. The Croatian National Guard obtained its first on 23 September 1991, near Petrinja, when a Yugoslav Air Force Mi-8 made an emergency landing after being damaged by small-arms fire. A further 6 Mi-8T and 18 Mi-8MTV-1 helicopters were bought from ex-Warsaw Pact countries during the war, with 16 being used in active service, and remaining were used as source for spare parts. The remaining Mi-8Ts were retired from service in the Croatian Air Force after the war, while the Mi-8MTVs continued their service in 20th Transport Helicopter Squadron and 28th Transport Helicopter Squadron. The latter has been re-equipped with new Mi-171Sh helicopters bought from Russia.

The Army of the Republic of Bosnia and Herzegovina secretly obtained Mi-8T, Mi-8MTV and Mi-17 helicopters from various sources. Two helicopters were shot down by Serb air defenses, one around Žepa, while one Mi-17 was shot down by 2K12 Kub M, killing the Bosnian Foreign Affairs Minister Irfan Ljubijankić, a few other politicians, and the helicopter's Ukrainian crew. A few Croatian Mi-8MTVs secretly supported Croatian Defence Council operations in Herceg Bosna. After the war, the Army of the Federation of Bosnia and Herzegovina operated the remaining five Mi-8MTVs and one Mi-8T in the Air Force and Air Defense Brigade of Armed Forces of Bosnia and Herzegovina.

The North Macedonian Air Force bought two Mi-8MT helicopters in 2001 from Ukraine. They fly in the Transport Helicopter Squadron (ex 301. Transport Helicopter Squadron). One crashed, killing all 8 passengers and 3 crew members in an accident in January 2008.

During the Kosovo War of 1998 and 1999, the Federal Yugoslav Air Force used Mi-8s for transport of personnel and material to forces in otherwise-inaccessible mountain areas. Evacuation of injured personnel also occurred during the 1999 NATO bombing of Yugoslavia, flying at low altitude to avoid detection by NATO aircraft. In 1999, Yugoslav Mi-8s shot down at least one US Army Hunter UAV with the door gunner's 7.62 mm machine gun. Two Mi-17V helicopters secretly operated by the Special Operations Unit post-1997 were also active during the Kosovar conflict. After the unit disbanded in 2003, the helicopters were transferred to Serbia and Montenegro's air force.

As of mid-2020, the Serbian Air Force, the successor of the Federal Yugoslav Air Force, operates a small amount of Mi-8T which are now being replaced by Mi-17 helicopters. There are 13 Mi-17 in the Serbian air force currently. They are in the 138th Mixed-Transport-Aviation Squadron of 204th Air Base and 119th Combined-Arms Helicopter Squadron (ex 199th regiment) of 98th Air Base.

=== Others ===
- Canada – After Canada committed combat forces to fight the Taliban in Afghanistan, they realized their mobility depended on borrowed helicopter airlift. In 2007, the Minister of National Defence Peter MacKay announced the lease of 6 to 8 Mi-8s, particularly Kazan Helicopters Mi-17-V5s, until the introduction of 6 interim CH-47Ds in 2008 and later delivery of 15 new-build CH-47Fs in 2013 by the RCAF.
- Poland – On 4 December 2003, a Polish Mi-8 crashed near Piaseczno while carrying Prime Minister Leszek Miller, ten other passengers and four crewmen. There were no fatalities. The cause of the accident was the icing of the engines. The pilot was accused of causing the crash, but he was found not guilty.
- Syria – During the Yom Kippur War of October 1973, Syria landed special forces troops behind Israel Defense Forces lines on the Golan Heights at Mt. Hermon, Tel Fares, Vaset, Nafach and Ein Zivan – A Dalve.
- Yemen—On 19 November 2023, Houthi rebels utilized a captured Mi-17 helicopter to conduct an air assault boarding and seizure of the Japanese owned cargo ship Galaxy Leader.
- Vietnam- On 22 November 1992 a Vietnamese Mi-8 was sent from Hanoi carrying rescue workers for Flight 474, but it crashed near Ô Kha mountain on the same day. All seven people aboard were killed
- Paraguay - One Mil Mi-8 was rented from a Hungarian company. It arrived to the country the 16th of May, 1992 and eventually used by the National Police of Paraguay, until it was destroyed in an accident in 1994.

== Variants ==
=== Prototypes/experimental/low production rate ===
V-8 (NATO – Hip-A)
The original single-engined prototype.
V-8A
A twin-engined prototype, featuring TV2-117 turboshaft engines, the prototype underwent further modifications during its life.
V-8AT
Prototype of the Mi-8T utility version.
Mi-8 (NATO – Hip-B)
Twin-engined prototype.
Mi-8TG
Conversion to operate on liquefied petroleum gas (LPG).
Mi-18
Prototype design, a modification of the existing Mil Mi-8. Two Mi-8s were extended by 0.9 meters (3 ft), the landing gear made retractable, and a sliding door added to the starboard side of the fuselage. The Mi-18s were used in the Soviet invasion of Afghanistan, and later used as static training airframes for pilots of the Mi-8/17.

=== Basic military transport/airframe ===
Mi-8T (NATO – Hip-C)
First mass production utility transport version, it can carry four UV-16-57 unguided rocket pods, (with S-5 rockets), mounted to four hardpoints on two outrigger pylons, and is armed with one or two side-mounted PK machine guns.
Mi-8TV
Armed version of the Mi-8T.
Mi-8TVK (NATO – Hip-E, a.k.a. Mi-8TB)
Version used as a gunship or direct air support platform. Airframe modifications add 2x external hard points for a total of 6, and mount a flexible 12.7 mm (0.5-inch) KV-4 machine gun in the nose. Armament of 57 mm S-5 rockets, six UV-32-57 rocket pods, 551-lb (250-kg) bombs, or four AT-2 Swatter ATGMs.
Mi-8TBK (NATO – Hip-F)
Armed export version, fitted with six launch rails to carry and fire Malyutka missiles.

=== Command and electronic warfare ===
Mi-8IV (NATO – Hip-G, a.k.a. Mi-9)
Airborne command post version fitted with "Ivolga" system, characterized by antennas, and Doppler radar on tail boom.
Mi-8PP (NATO – Hip-K)
Airborne jamming platform with "Polye" (field) system. From 1980, the type was fitted with the new "Akatsiya" system and redesignated the Mi-8PPA. It is characterized by six X-shaped antennas on each side of the aft fuselage. Built to escort troop-carrying versions of this helicopter, and disrupt potentially nearby SPAAG radars, such as those of the Flakpanzer Gepard.
Mi-8PD
Polish airborne command post version.
Mi-8SMV (NATO – Hip-J)
Airborne jamming platform with "Smalta-V" system, characterized by two small boxes on each side of the fuselage. Used for protection of ground attack aircraft against enemy air defenses.
Mi-8VKP (NATO – Hip-D, a.k.a. Mi-8VzPU)
Airborne communications platform with rectangular communication canisters mounted on weapons racks and with two frame-type aerials above the rear fuselage.

=== Other military ===
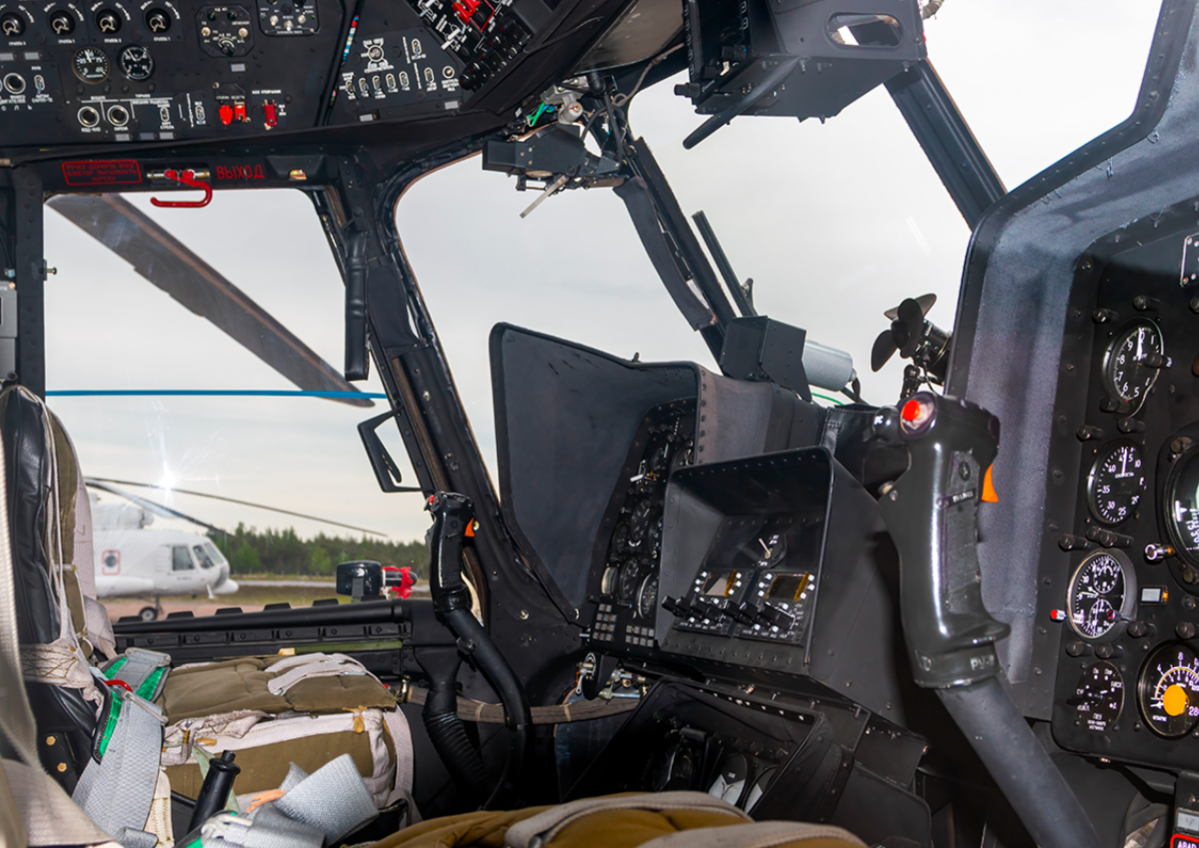
Mi-8 helicopter cockpit

Mi-8AD
Minelaying version with four VSM-1 dispensers.
Mi-8AV
Minelaying version with VMR-1 or −2 system for 64 or 200 anti-tank mines.
Mi-8BT
Mine-clearing version.
Mi-8MB "Bissektrisa"
Military ambulance version.
Mi-8R (a.k.a. Mi-8GR)
Tactical reconnaissance version with Elint system "Grebeshok-5".
Mi-8K
Artillery observation, reconnaissance version.
Mi-8SMT
Military staff transport version, fitted with improved radio equipment R-832 and R-111.
Mi-8SKA
Photo-reconnaissance version.
Mi-8SP
Spacecraft tracking and recovery version.
Mi-8T(K)
Photo-reconnaissance version.
Mi-8TZ
Fuel transport tanker version.
Mi-8TB
The Mi-8TB was developed in the GDR and specially adapted to the military needs there. It was equipped with various missile and bomb systems, including S-5 missiles and FAB-500 bombs, which could be used to attack ground targets. These adjustments made them a type of "transport bomber," which explained the "TB" designation.
Mi-8MTYu
Only one was built and used by the Ukrainian Air Force, based at AB "Kirovske". Intended for detection of re-entry vehicles, and small surface targets. In the nose radar antenna.
Mi-8MSB
Modernized passenger-transport version for civil aviation.
Mi-8MSB-V
Modernized multipurpose helicopter for the Ukrainian Armed Forces.

=== Civil ===
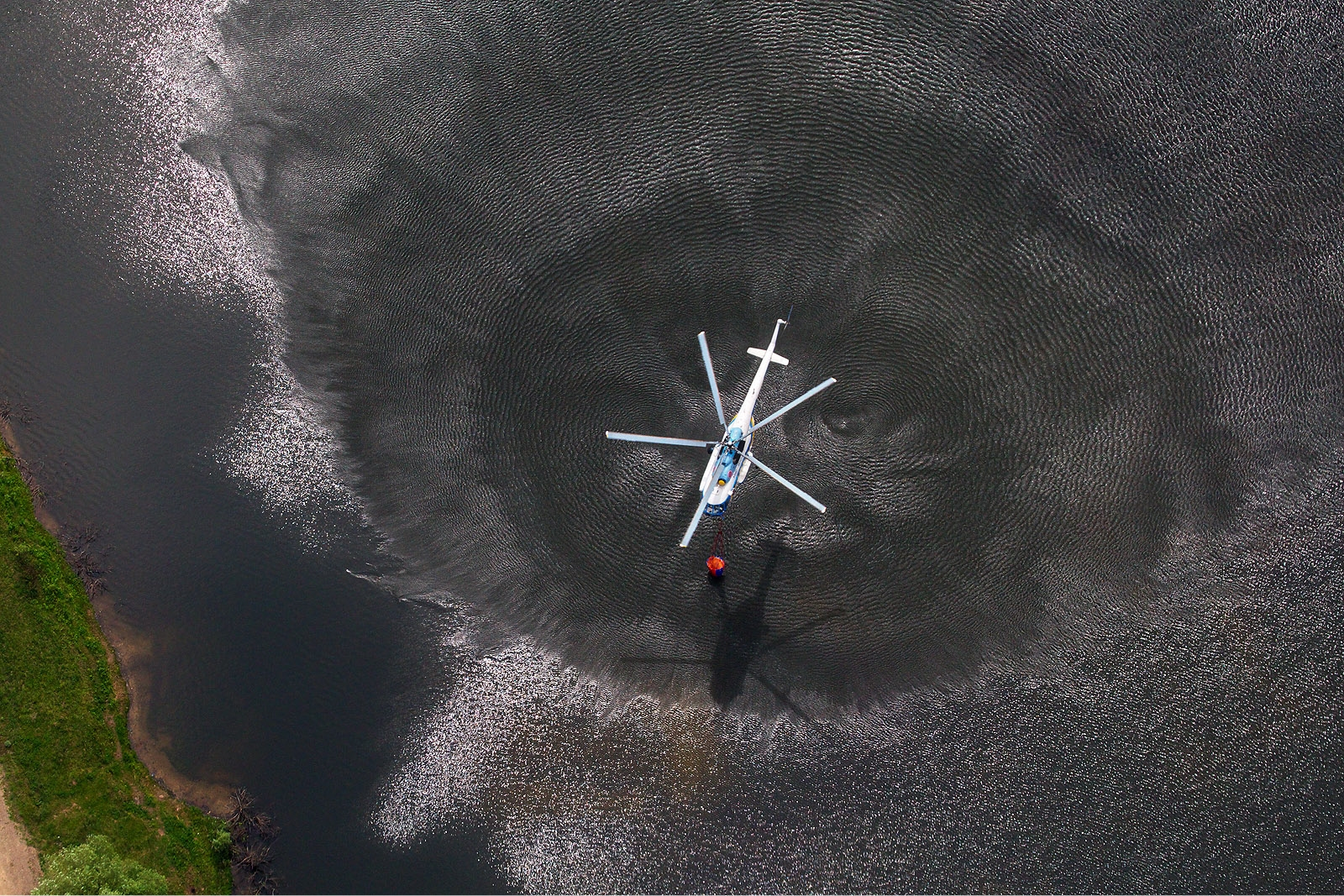
Ukrainian Ministry of Emergency Situations Mi-8MSB picking up water for aerial firefighting purposes

Mi-8T (NATO – Hip-C)
Civilian and military utility transport version, with accommodation for 24 passengers, fitted with tip-up seats along the cabin walls, circular cabin windows and large rear clamshell doors with a sloping hinge line. The Mi-8T is powered by two 1,677 shp (1,251 kW) Klimov TV2-117A turboshaft engines, giving the helicopter a maximum speed of 155 mph (249 km/h) at sea level.
Mi-8P
Civilian passenger transport version, with accommodation for between 28 and 32 passengers, fitted with square cabin windows, small rear clamshell doors with a vertical hinge line and a horizontally split rear airstair door in between; powered by two 1,700 hp (1,300 kW) Klimov TV2-117A turboshaft engines.
Mi-8S "Salon"
Civilian VIP transport version, with accommodation for between 9 and 11 passengers, equipped with a galley and toilet.
Mi-8MPS
Search and rescue version (operated usually in Malaysia for Fire and Rescue Department services).
Mi-8MA
Polar exploration version for use in the Arctic.
Mi-8MT
Flying crane version.
Mi-8AT
Civilian transport version, fitted with two improved TV2-117AG turboshaft engines.
Mi-8ATS
Agricultural version, fitted with a hopper and spray bars.
Mi-8TL
Air accident investigation version.
Mi-8TM
Upgraded transport version, fitted with a weather radar.
Mi-8TS
Hot and high desert version.
Mi-8VIP
Deluxe VIP transport version, with accommodation for between 7 and 9 passengers.
Mi-8PA
Modified version for Japanese regulations. One only was built, in 1980. It was used by Aero Asahi for heavy material transport in a mountainous region. It was retired in 1993 and later moved to the Tokorozawa Aviation Museum.

== Accidents and incidents ==
Date	Model	Incident	Location	Casualties
1 November 1974	Mil Mi-8T	Collided with an Antonov An‑2	Surgut, Soviet Union	Killed all 24 people on the helicopter and all 14 people on the Antonov An-2
18 June 1981	Mil Mi-8T	Crashed in bad weather	Near Zarumilla, Peru	Killed nine of its eleven occupants, among them Peruvian Army commander, General Rafael Hoyos Rubio.
18 September 1981	Mil Mi-8T	Collided with a Yakovlev Yak‑40	East of Zheleznogorsk-Ilimsky, Russia	Killed all seven crew on the helicopter and all thirty-three people on the Yak-40
2 October 1986	Mil Mi-8	Collided with crane cables	Due to the pilot being blinded by the sun. used to disperse boron and sand over the Chernobyl reactor 4	Killed all four crew members
24 November 1994	Mil Mi-8	Crashed	Asunción, Paraguay	No casualties
17 September 2001	Mil Mi-8	Shot down	by a Chechen group in Grozny, Chechnya, Russia	Killed all 13 people aboard
27 January 2002	Mil Mi-8	Shot down	Shelkovskaya, Nadterechny District, Russia	Killed all 14 people aboard
4 December 2003	Mil Mi-8P	Crashed	Near Piaseczno, Poland	Injured eight or 14 people aboard, including Polish Prime Minister Leszek Miller
11 September 2006	Mil Mi-8	Shot down	By militant group Kataib al-Khoul near Vladikavkaz, Russia	Killed 12 of the 16 people aboard
23 September 2006	Mil Mi-8 MTV 1	Crashed	Ghunsa, Nepal	Killed all 24 people aboard
27 April 2007	Mil Mi-8	Crashed	Near Shatoy, Chechnya, Russia	Killed all 20 people aboard
3 June 2007	Mil Mi-8	Crashed	Lungi, Sierra Leone	Killed all 22 people aboard
6 October 2010	Mil Mi-8	Crashed	Rasht Valley, Tajikistan	killed seven or 28 people aboard
7 April 2013	Mil Mi-8PS	Crashed	Loreto, Peru	Killed all 13 people aboard
2 July 2013	Mil Mi-8	Crashed	Near Deputatsky, Sakha Republic, Russia	Killed 24 of the 28 people aboard
21 October 2016	Mil Mi-8T	Crashed	Yamalo-Nenets Autonomous Okrug, Yamal Peninsula, Siberia, Russia	Killed 19 of the 22 people aboard
12 August 2021	Mil Mi-8T	Crashed	Into Kurile Lake, Kamchatka Krai, Russia	Killed eight people
31 August 2024	Mil Mi-8T	Crashed	Kamchatka Peninsula, Russia	Killed all 22 people aboard
28 September 2024	Mil Mi-8 MTV-1	Crashed	Waziristan, Pakistan	Killed six people out of the 15 aboard

== Operators ==
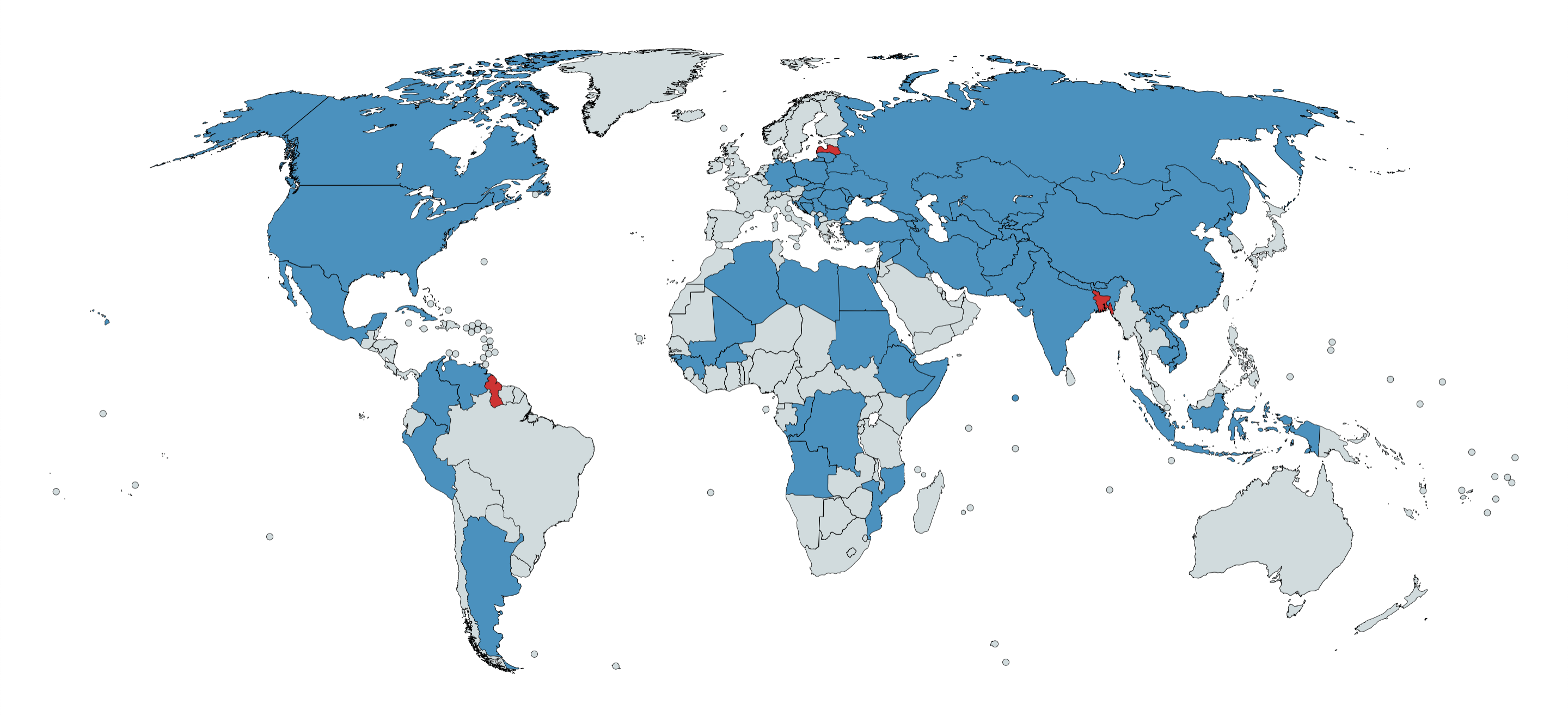
Operators Current Former

- Afghanistan
- Algeria
- Angola
- Argentina
- Armenia
- Azerbaijan
- Belarus
- Bhutan
- Bosnia and Herzegovina
- Bulgaria
- Burkina Faso
- Cambodia
- Canada (leased from SkyLink Aviation)
- China
- Colombia
- Congo-Brazzaville
- Congo-Kinshasa
- Cuba
- Czech Republic
- Djibouti
- Egypt
- Eritrea
- Ethiopia
- Georgia
- Guinea
- Guinea-Bissau
- Hungary
- India
- Indonesia
- Iran
- Iraq
- Kazakhstan
- Kyrgyzstan
- Laos
- Libya
- Lithuania
- Maldives
- Mexico
- Mali
- Moldova
- Mongolia
- Mozambique
- Nepal
- North Korea
- Peru
- Poland
- Russia
- Serbia
- Sudan
- Transnistria: 5
- Turkey
- Turkmenistan
- Tajikistan
- Ukraine
- United States of America
- Uzbekistan
- Venezuela
- Vietnam
- Houthi movement* (captured).

=== Former operators ===
- Albania
- Artsakh
- Bangladesh
- Benin
- Czechoslovakia
- Croatia
- East Germany
- Finland
- Germany
- Guyana
- Latvia
- Pakistan
- Paraguay
- Romania
- Serbia and Montenegro
- Serbian Krajina
- Slovakia
- Somalia
- Soviet Union
- Syria
- Yugoslavia

== Specifications (Mi-8MT) ==
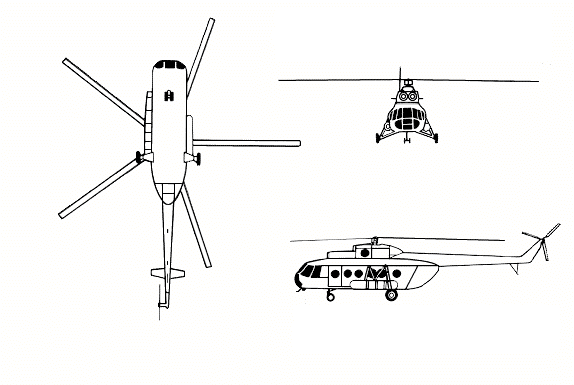
Mil Mi-8 three-view drawing

Data from Jane's All the World's Aircraft 1992–93

General characteristics

- Crew: 3 (pilot, copilot, flight engineer)
- Capacity: 24 passengers or 12 stretchers and seat for one medical attendant or 4,000 kg (8,800 lb) on internal/external hardpoints
- Length: 18.4 m (60 ft 4 in)
- Height: 5.5 m (18 ft 1 in)
- Empty weight: 7,100 kg (15,653 lb)
- Gross weight: 11,100 kg (24,471 lb)
- Max takeoff weight: 13,000 kg (28,660 lb)
- Fuel capacity: 3,700 L (980 US gal; 810 imp gal)
- Powerplant: 2 × Klimov TV3-117MT turboshaft engines, 1,454 kW (1,950 hp) each
- Main rotor diameter: 21.29 m (69 ft 10 in)
- Main rotor area: 356 m^{2} (3,830 sq ft)
- Blade section: NACA 23012

Performance

- Maximum speed: 250 km/h (160 mph, 130 kn)
- Cruise speed: 240 km/h (150 mph, 130 kn)
- Range: 495 km (308 mi, 267 nmi)
- Ferry range: 960 km (600 mi, 520 nmi)
- Service ceiling: 5,000 m (16,000 ft)

Armament

- 4,000 kg (8,818 lb) of disposable stores on six hardpoints, including 57 mm S-5 rockets, bombs, or 9M17 Phalanga ATGMs and one or two side-mounted PK machine guns

== See also ==
- Utility helicopter

Related development

- Mil Mi-14
- Mil Mi-17
- Mil Mi-24

Aircraft of comparable role, configuration, and era

- Aérospatiale SA 330 Puma
- Boeing Vertol CH-46 Sea Knight
