= 2002 Shelkovskaya Mi-8 crash =

2002 aviation accident in Russia

Coordinates: 43°24′N 45°43′E

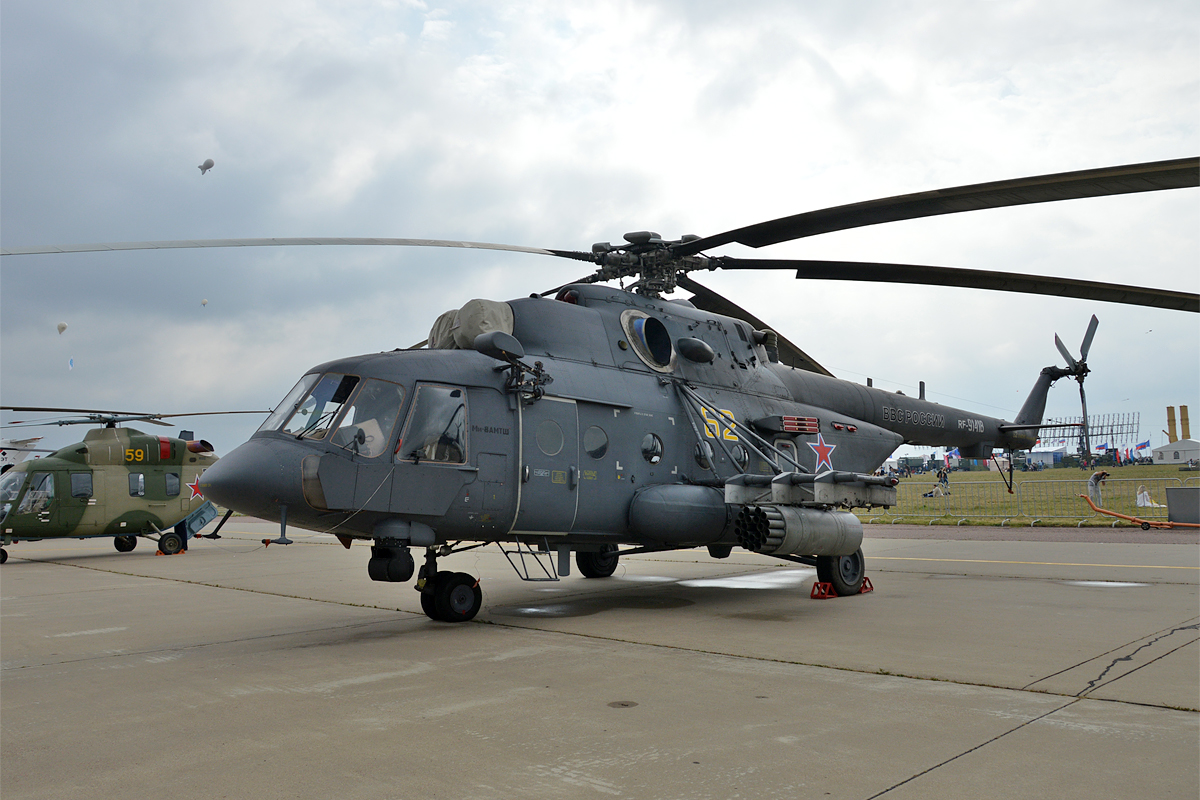
- A Russian Mil-Mi-8 similar to the aircraft involved in the incident.

Occurrence
- Date: January 27, 2002
- Summary: Shot down by 9K38 Igla missile
- Site: Near Shelkovskaya, Nadterechny District, Chechnya

Aircraft
- Aircraft type: Mil Mi-8
- Operator: Russian Ministry of Internal Affairs
- Registration: Unknown
- Passengers: 11
- Crew: 3
- Fatalities: 14
- Survivors: 0

The 2002 Shelkovskaya Mil Mi-8 crash in Chechnya killed 14 people, including senior Russian officers, among them the deputy Interior Minister Mikhail Rudchenko.

On January 27, 2002, a Russian Interior Ministry Mil Mi-8 was shot down and exploded near Shelkovskaya in Nadterechny District, killing 14 people including crew. Among those killed in the crash were Lieutenant-General Mikhail Rudchenko responsible for security in the Southern Federal District, and Major-General Nikolai Goridov, deputy commander of the Internal Troops, as well as Colonels Oriyenko, Stepanenko, and Trafimov.
