= 2003 Polish Air Force Mil Mi-8 crash =

Helicopter crash near Warsaw

Coordinates: 52°02′08″N 21°04′06″E

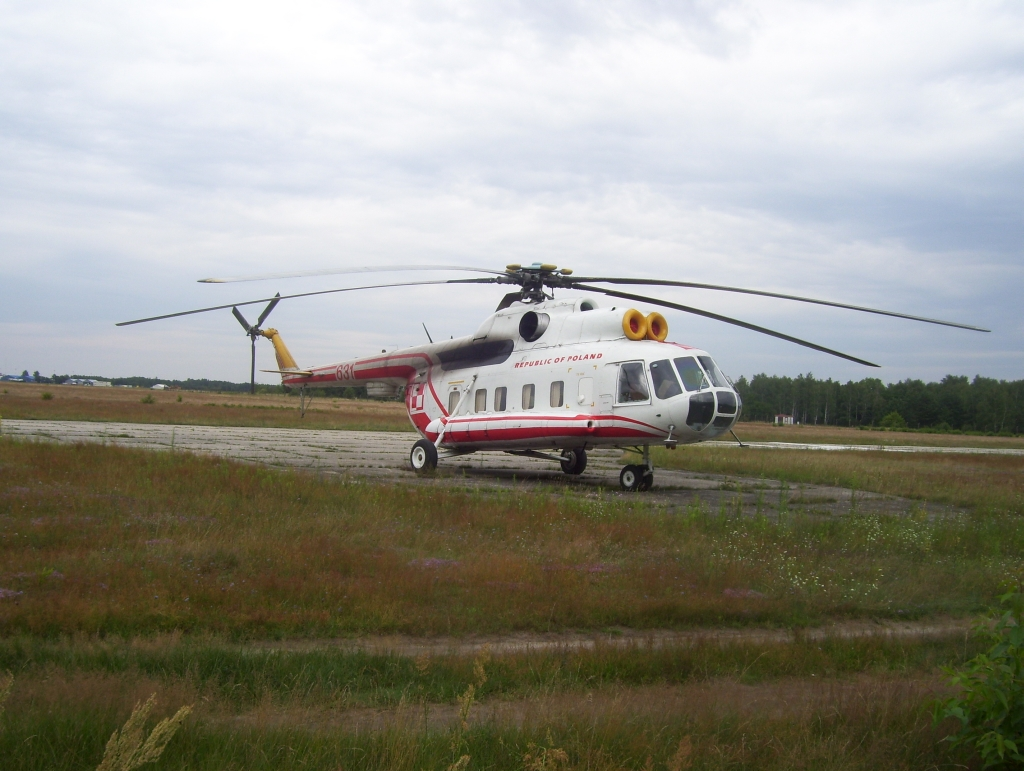
- Mil Mi-8 helicopter with Polish AF serial 631, operated in the same manner as the crash aircraft

Accident
- Date: 4 December 2003
- Summary: Dual engine failure due to icing, resulting in crash
- Site: Pilawa, Poland

Aircraft
- Aircraft type: Mil Mi-8P
- Operator: Polish Air Force
- Registration: 632
- Flight origin: Southern Poland (Specific airport unknown)
- Destination: Unknown
- Occupants: 15
- Fatalities: 0
- Injuries: 14
- Survivors: 15

On 4 December 2003, a Polish Air Force Mil Mi-8 helicopter operated by the 36th Special Aviation Regiment carrying Poland's Prime Minister Leszek Miller crashed near Piaseczno, just outside Warsaw. Following the failure of both engines, the pilot performed an autorotation landing in a forest. The helicopter suffered extensive damage and was written off as a total loss, but despite the severity of the crash there were no fatalities. Fourteen of the 15 people on board were injured, including the Prime Minister Leszek Miller, who had two of his thoracic vertebrae broken.

== Background ==
=== Aircraft ===
The helicopter was a 26-year-old Mil Mi-8P, operated by the 36th Special Aviation Regiment who were responsible for transporting Polish government officials.

=== Crew ===
The pilot of the helicopter was Major Marek Miłosz, later promoted to lieutenant colonel.

== Cause ==
The cause of the engine failure was determined to be icing.

== Trial ==
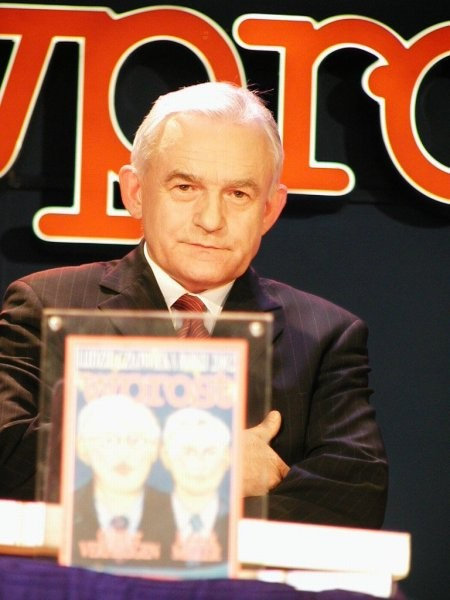
Polish Prime Minister Leszek Miller in January 2003

On 10 March 2004, Miłosz was criminally charged with violating flight safety rules and causing the crash. Specifically, the pilot was blamed for not manually turning on the deicing equipment during the flight. The pilot argued that the meteorologic information available to him at the time did not indicate that icing was likely, and hence he was not required to turn on the deicing equipment. He was consulting a thermometer during the flight, but it suffered from a systematic measurement error and hence was unable to warn of icing. In addition, during the flight an unusual thermal inversion occurred; the temperature rose with altitude, which the pilot could not have predicted. In March 2010, the 6-year trial ended with a verdict of not guilty. The judge in the case noted the pilot expertly carried out the difficult autorotation landing and that the passengers survived because of his superb piloting skills. Leszek Miller declared that if he had to fly again in a helicopter in difficult atmospheric conditions, he would choose Miłosz as his pilot.

== See also ==
- 2010 Polish Air Force Tu-154 crash, where the Polish president and many politicians, military officers and clerics from Poland died
