= Shelkovskoy District =

Shelkovskoy District Шелковской район (Russian)
- District

Other transcription(s)
  - Chechen: Шелковскан кӀошт
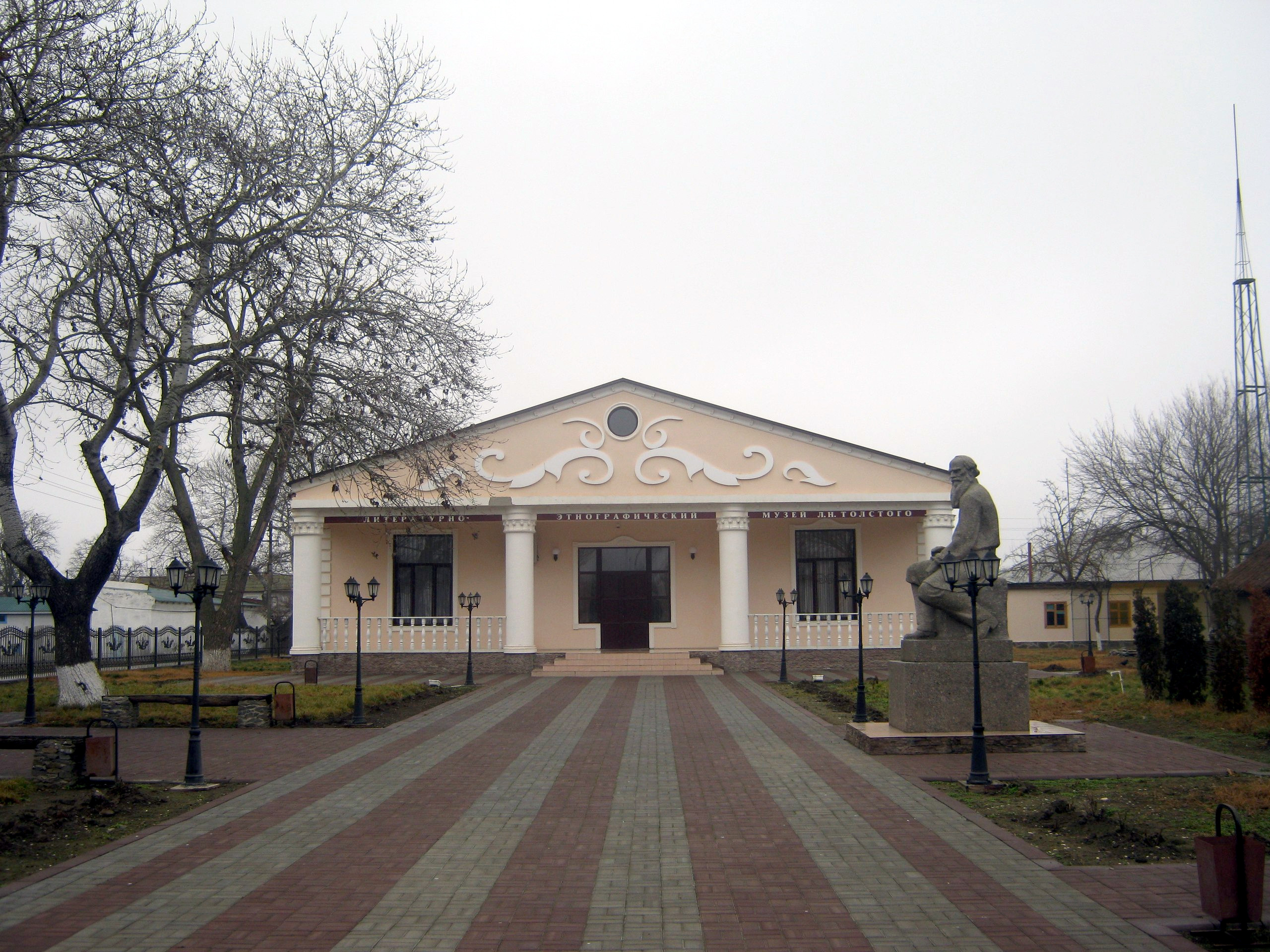
- Tolstoy museum, Shelkovsky District

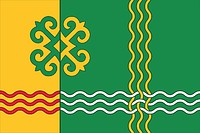
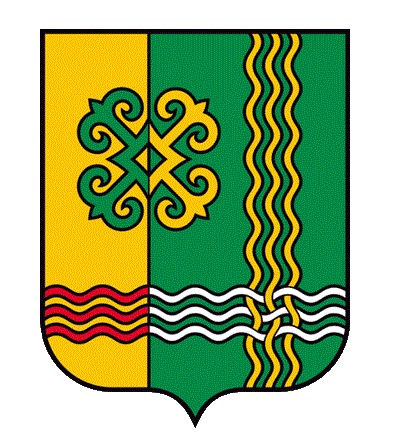
- Flag Coat of arms
- Location of Shelkovskoy District in the Chechen Republic
- Coordinates: 43°30′32″N 46°19′57″E
- Country: Russia
- Federal subject: Chechen Republic
- Established: 1923
- Administrative center: Shelkovskaya

Area
  - Total: 3,000 km^{2} (1,200 sq mi)

Population (2010 Census)
  - Total: 53,548
  - Density: 18/km^{2} (46/sq mi)
  - Urban: 0%
  - Rural: 100%

Administrative structure
  - Administrative divisions: 19 rural administration
  - Inhabited localities: 25 rural localities

Municipal structure
  - Municipally incorporated as: Shelkovskoy Municipal District
  - Municipal divisions: 0 urban settlements, 12 rural settlements
- Time zone: UTC+3 (MSK)
- OKTMO ID: 96640000
- Website: http://chr-shelkovskoy.ru/

Shelkovskoy District (Russian: Шелковско́й райо́н; Chechen: Шелковскан кӀошт, Şelkovskan khoşt) is an administrative and municipal district (raion), one of the fifteen in the Chechen Republic, Russia. It is located in the northeast of the republic. The area of the district is 3,000 square kilometers (1,200 sq mi). Its administrative center is the rural locality (a stanitsa) of Shelkovskaya. Population: 53,548 (2010 census); 50,233 (2002 Census); 44,975 (1989 Soviet census). The population of Shelkovskaya accounts for 20.8% of the district's total population.

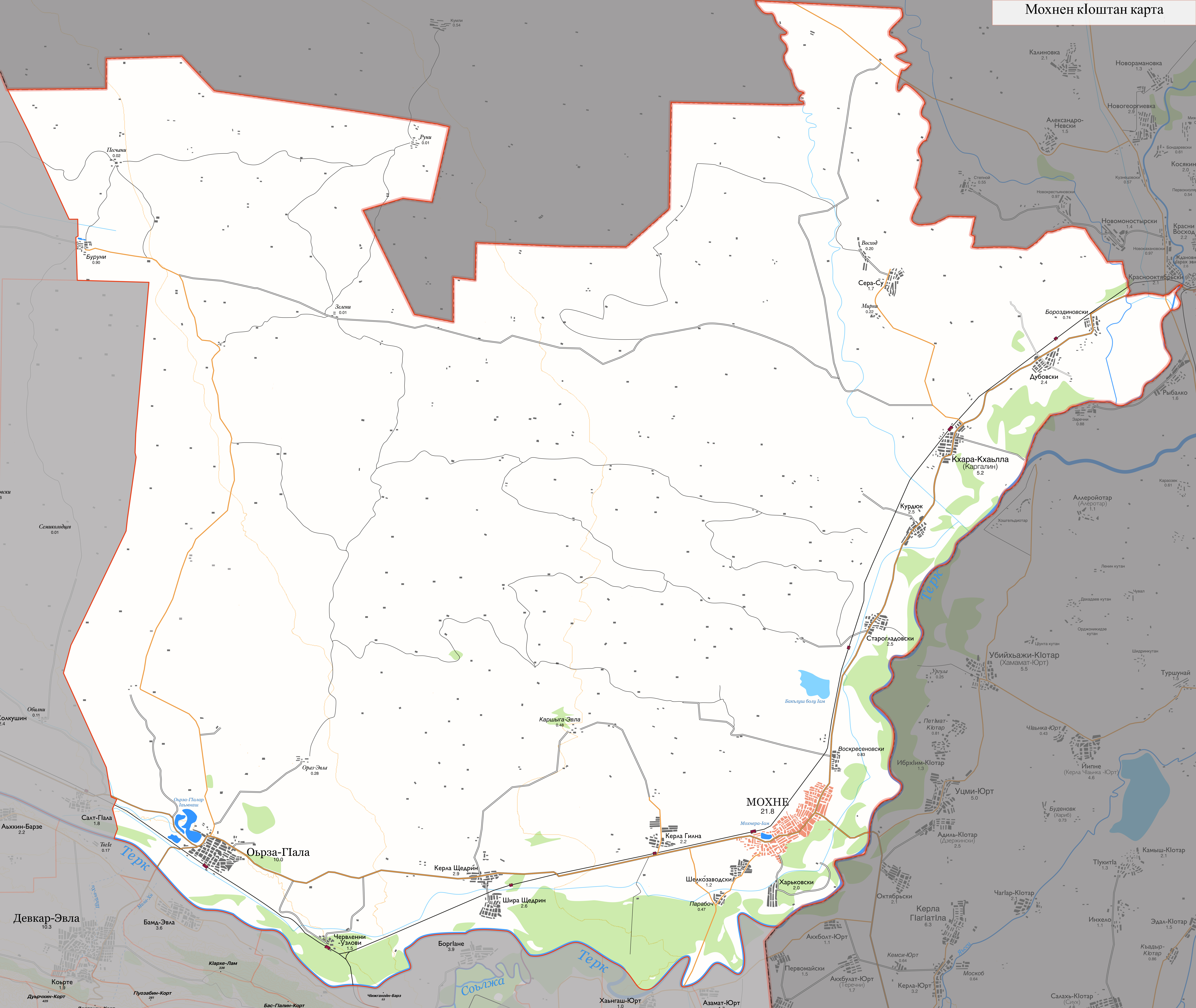
Map of the Shelkovskoy district (in Chechen)

== Shelkovsk incident ==
December 2005, multiple children in schools in the district especially the village of Starogladovskaya experienced a mass outbreak of respiratory problems, seizures and "other symptoms suggestive of nervous system hypersensitivity."

In total 100 people, mostly schoolchildren were hospitalised and three were killed of poisoning. An official enquiry into the incident by a Government Commission reported that there were no signs of chemical poisoning and was simply an outbreak of mass hysteria related to the emergency situation in the Chechen Republic.

However, much doubt has been cast over the truth of this enquiry. In a memo from a military specialist leaked to Anna Politkovskaya and other journalists, a poisonous substance was present in the school. Many possible suspects have been considered including Ethylene glycol or a nerve agent, accused by Chechen separatist leaders as the work of the Russians.
