= Boriskino =

Boriskino Борискино
- Village
- Location within Bashkortostan Location within Russia
- Coordinates: 54°28′N 55°47′E
- Country: Russia
- Region: Bashkortostan
- District: Chishminsky District
- Time zone: UTC+5:00

Boriskino (Russian: Борискино) is a rural locality (a village) in Yengalyshevsky Selsoviet, Chishminsky District, Bashkortostan, Russia. The population was 101 as of 2010. There are 4 streets in the village.

== Geography ==
Boriskino is located 43 km southeast of Chishmy, the district's administrative centre. Vyazovka is the nearest rural locality.
