= Shelkovskaya =

Rural locality in Chechnya, Russia

Coordinates: 43°31′N 46°20′E

Shelkovskaya (Russian: Шелковская; Chechen: Шелковски, Şelkovski) is a rural locality (a stanitsa) and the administrative center of Shelkovskoy District of the Chechen Republic, Russia. Population: 11,112 (2010 census); 9,581 (2002 census); 7,961 (1989 Soviet census).

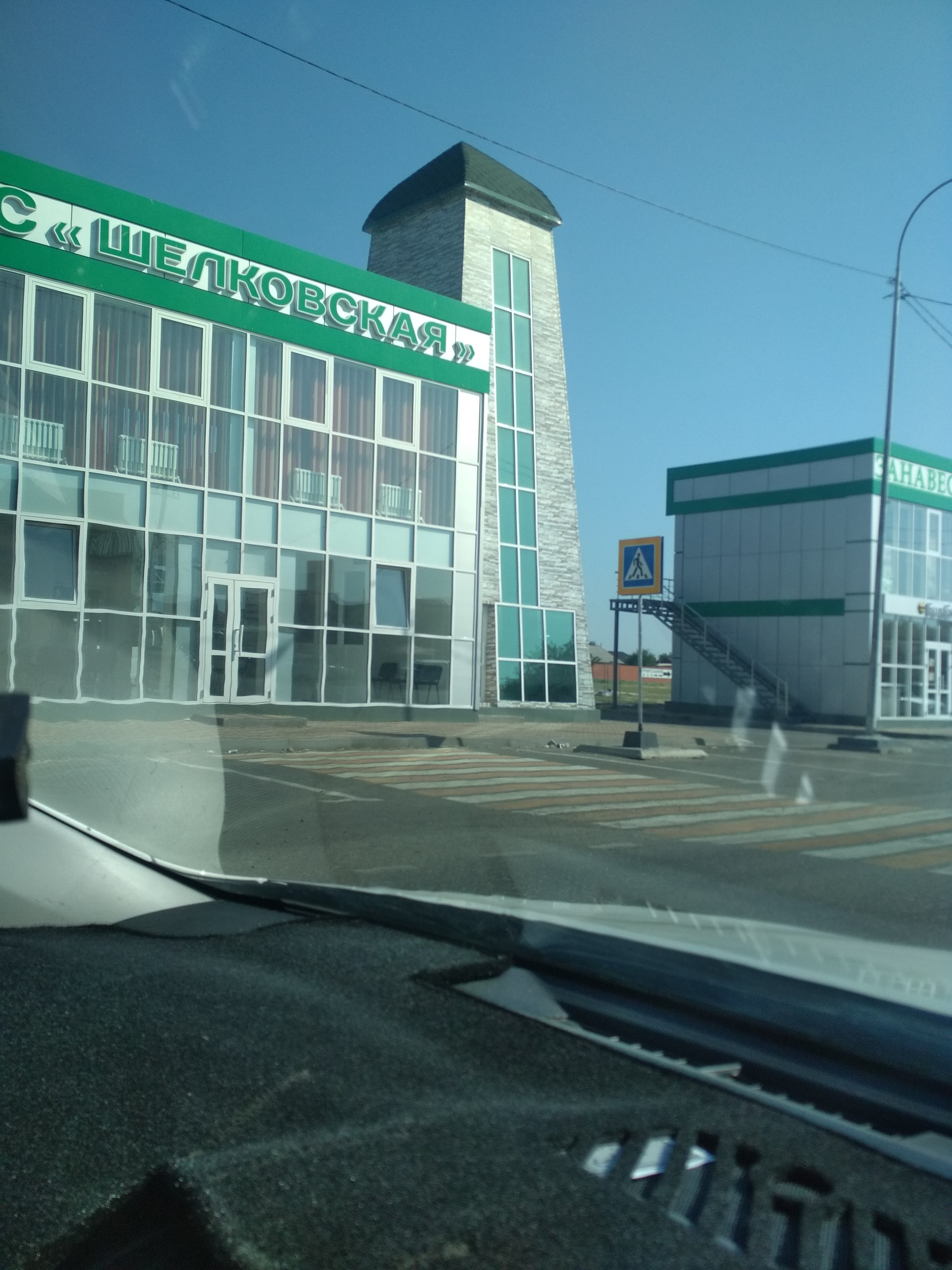
Bus station
